= 1986 Ibero-American Championships in Athletics – Results =

These are the results of the 1986 Ibero-American Championships in Athletics which took place from 27 to 28 September 1986 at Estadio Pedro Marrero in Havana, Cuba.

== Men's results ==
=== 100 meters ===
Heat 1 – 27 September
Wind: +1.3 m/s

Rank	Name	Nationality	Time	Notes
1	Andrés Simón	Cuba	10.59	Q
2	Luis Cunha	Portugal	10.67	Q
3	Katsuhiko Nakaia	Brazil	10.68	Q
4	Federico Cohen	Argentina	10.81	q
5	Giorgio Mautino	Peru	10.97	

Heat 2 – 27 September
Wind: -0.5 m/s

Rank	Name	Nationality	Time	Notes
1	Robson da Silva	Brazil	10.35	Q
2	Ricardo Chacón	Cuba	10.56	Q
3	Arnaldo Abrantes	Portugal	10.66	Q
4	Oscar Barrionuevo	Argentina	10.83	q
5	Óscar Fernández	Peru	10.99	

Final – 27 September
Wind: +1.8 m/s

Rank	Name	Nationality	Time	Notes
1st place, gold medalist(s)	Robson da Silva	Brazil	10.02	
2nd place, silver medalist(s)	Andrés Simón	Cuba	10.19	
3rd place, bronze medalist(s)	Ricardo Chacón	Cuba	10.36	
4	Arnaldo Abrantes	Portugal	10.54	
5	Katsuhiko Nakaia	Brazil	10.59	
6	Luis Cunha	Portugal	10.63	
7	Oscar Barrionuevo	Argentina	10.66	
8	Federico Cohen	Argentina	10.78	

=== 200 meters ===
Heat 1 – 28 September
Wind: +1.8 m/s

Rank	Name	Nationality	Time	Notes
1	Robson da Silva	Brazil	20.95	Q
2	Antonio Sánchez	Spain	21.31	Q
3	Marco Mautino	Peru	21.41	Q
4	Sergio Querol	Cuba	21.52	q
5	José María Beduino	Argentina	21.70	q
6	Humberto Newball	Nicaragua	22.30	

Heat 2 – 28 September
Wind: +1.8 m/s

Rank	Name	Nationality	Time	Notes
1	Juan José Prado	Spain	21.64	Q
2	Oscar Barrionuevo	Argentina	21.72	Q
3	Luis Cunha	Portugal	22.50	Q
	Félix Stevens	Cuba	DNF	

Final – 28 September
Wind: +1.2 m/s

Rank	Name	Nationality	Time	Notes
1st place, gold medalist(s)	Robson da Silva	Brazil	20.43	
2nd place, silver medalist(s)	Luis Cunha	Portugal	21.08	
3rd place, bronze medalist(s)	Antonio Sánchez	Spain	21.23	
4	Juan José Prado	Spain	21.29	
5	Marco Mautino	Peru	21.48	
6	Oscar Barrionuevo	Argentina	21.59	
7	Sergio Querol	Cuba	21.65	
8	José María Beduino	Argentina	21.73	

=== 400 meters ===
Final – 27 September

Rank	Name	Nationality	Time	Notes
1st place, gold medalist(s)	Félix Stevens	Cuba	45.83	
2nd place, silver medalist(s)	Roberto Hernández	Cuba	46.03	
3rd place, bronze medalist(s)	Cayetano Cornet	Spain	47.03	
4	José María Beduino	Argentina	47.57	
5	Moisés del Castillo	Peru	47.96	
6	Ramiro Quintana	Peru	48.51	
7	Dardo Angerami	Argentina	48.68	
8	Francisco Recios	Guatemala	50.28	

=== 800 meters ===
Final – 28 September

Rank	Name	Nationality	Time	Notes
1st place, gold medalist(s)	Mauricio Hernández	Mexico	1:48.05	
2nd place, silver medalist(s)	Luis Karim Toledo	Mexico	1:48.81	
3rd place, bronze medalist(s)	Luis Migueles	Argentina	1:49.19	
4	José Luis Isaac	Cuba	1:49.36	
5	Manuel José Balmaceda	Chile	1:51.82	
6	Alberto López	Guatemala	1:53.33	

=== 1500 meters ===
Final – 27 September

Rank	Name	Nationality	Time	Notes
1st place, gold medalist(s)	José Luis Carreira	Spain	3:44.93	
2nd place, silver medalist(s)	Andrés Vera	Spain	3:44.99	
3rd place, bronze medalist(s)	Mauricio Hernández	Mexico	3:45.68	
4	Jacinto Navarrete	Colombia	3:46.21	
5	Alberto López	Guatemala	3:51.52	
	Félix Mesa	Cuba	DNF	

=== 5000 meters ===
Final – 28 September

Rank	Name	Nationality	Time	Notes
1st place, gold medalist(s)	Abel Antón	Spain	13:49.76	
2nd place, silver medalist(s)	Adauto Domingues	Brazil	13:50.36	
3rd place, bronze medalist(s)	Elisio Rios	Portugal	13:51.34	
4	Jacinto Navarrete	Colombia	13:52.91	
5	José Manuel Albentosa	Spain	13:55.40	
6	Joaquim Pinheiro	Portugal	13:58.08	
7	Germán Beltrán	Venezuela	14:03.61	
8	Marcelo Cascabelo	Argentina	14:10.44	
9	Hugo Allan García	Guatemala	14:13.85	
10	Ricardo Vera	Uruguay	14:22.53	
11	Roger Soler	Peru	14:22.75	
12	Simon Alvarado	Panama	14:27.45	
	Alberto Cuba	Cuba	DNF	

=== 10,000 meters ===
Final – 27 September

Rank	Name	Nationality	Time	Notes
1st place, gold medalist(s)	Elisio Rios	Portugal	29:59.54	
2nd place, silver medalist(s)	Joaquim Pinheiro	Portugal	29:59.71	
3rd place, bronze medalist(s)	Rolando Vera	Ecuador	30:10.05	
4	Santiago Llorente	Spain	30:20.66	
5	Alberto Cuba	Cuba	30:42.23	
6	Julio César Gómez	Argentina	31:05.25	
7	Hugo Allan García	Guatemala	31:09.63	
8	Raúl Miranda	Panama	31:20.12	
9	William Aguirre	Nicaragua	31:32.63	
10	Dimas Álvarez	Cuba	32:07.10	
	Roger Soler	Peru	DNF	

=== 3000 meters steeplechase ===
Final – 27 September

Rank	Name	Nationality	Time	Notes
1st place, gold medalist(s)	Adauto Domingues	Brazil	8:31.91	
2nd place, silver medalist(s)	Juan Ramón Conde	Cuba	8:34.08	
3rd place, bronze medalist(s)	Ricardo Vera	Uruguay	8:34.92	
4	Juan Jesús Linares	Cuba	8:43.29	
5	Domingo Ramón	Spain	8:54.67	
6	Marcelo Cascabelo	Argentina	9:10.50	

=== 110 meters hurdles ===
Final – 27 September
Wind: +1.9 m/s

Rank	Name	Nationality	Time	Notes
1st place, gold medalist(s)	Carlos Sala	Spain	13.89	
2nd place, silver medalist(s)	Lyndon Campos	Brazil	13.99	
3rd place, bronze medalist(s)	Ángel Bueno	Cuba	14.08	
4	Juan Saborit	Cuba	14.10	
5	Carlos Varas	Argentina	14.54	

=== 400 meters hurdles ===
Heat 1 – 28 September

Rank	Name	Nationality	Time	Notes
1	Pablo Squella	Chile	52.12	Q
2	José Alonso	Spain	52.42	Q
3	José Duany	Cuba	52.59	Q
4	Alberto Isu	Peru	53.17	q
5	Antonio Smith	Venezuela	53.21	q

Heat 2 – 28 September

Rank	Name	Nationality	Time	Notes
1	Francisco Velazco	Cuba	52.75	Q
2	Carlos dos Santos	Brazil	53.94	Q
3	Dardo Angerami	Argentina	54.12	Q
	Francisco Recios	Guatemala	DNF	

Final – 28 September

Rank	Name	Nationality	Time	Notes
1st place, gold medalist(s)	José Alonso	Spain	49.96	
2nd place, silver medalist(s)	Pablo Squella	Chile	50.17	
3rd place, bronze medalist(s)	Francisco Velazco	Cuba	50.75	
4	José Duany	Cuba	51.58	
5	Antonio Smith	Venezuela	52.16	
6	Carlos dos Santos	Brazil	52.87	
7	Alberto Isu	Peru	53.53	
8	Dardo Angerami	Argentina	53.59	

=== High jump ===
Final – 27 September

Rank	Name	Nationality	Attempts									Result	Notes
Rank	Name	Nationality	2.00	2.05	2.10	2.15	2.18	2.21	2.24	2.30	2.33	Result	Notes
1st place, gold medalist(s)	Javier Sotomayor	Cuba	–	–	–	o	xo	o	o	xxx		2.30	
2nd place, silver medalist(s)	Juan Francisco Centelles	Cuba	–	–	–	xxo	?	–	xxx			2.18	
3rd place, bronze medalist(s)	Gustavo Adolfo Becker	Spain	–	o	o	xo	xxo	–	xxx			2.18	
4	Fernando Pastoriza	Argentina	o	o	o	o	xxx					2.15	

=== Pole vault ===
Final – 28 September

Rank	Name	Nationality	Attempts						Result	Notes
Rank	Name	Nationality	4.50	4.70	4.90	5.00	5.20	5.30	Result	Notes
1st place, gold medalist(s)	Alberto Ruiz	Spain	–	–	–	o	xo	xxx	5.20	
2nd place, silver medalist(s)	Javier García	Spain	–	–	–	o	xxo	xxx	5.20	
3rd place, bronze medalist(s)	Rubén Camino	Cuba	–	–	xxo	o	xxx		5.00	
4	José Echevarría	Cuba	–	–	xxo	o	xxx		5.00	
5	Fernando Pastoriza	Argentina	o	o	xxx				4.70	
	Oscar Veit	Argentina	–	–	xxx				NM	

=== Long jump ===
Final – 28 September

Rank	Name	Nationality	Attempts						Result	Notes
Rank	Name	Nationality	1	2	3	4	5	6	Result	Notes
1st place, gold medalist(s)	Luis Bueno	Cuba	7.49 (+0.9)	7.78 (+0.8)	8.18 (+0.6)	7.82 (+0.2)	8.25 (+1.9)	x	8.25 (+1.9 m/s)	
2nd place, silver medalist(s)	Osvaldo Larrondo	Cuba	7.65 (+1.3)	7.42 (+0.2)	7.76 (+1.6)	7.82 (+0.4)	7.83 (+1.6)	7.78 w (+2.1)	7.83 (+1.6 m/s)	
3rd place, bronze medalist(s)	Olivier Cadier	Brazil	7.61 (+1.0)	x	7.72 (+1.6)	7.63 (−0.6)	7.45 (+0.6)	x	7.72 (+1.6 m/s)	
4	Carlos Casar	Mexico	6.91 (+0.5)	7.14 w (+2.4)	7.37 (+1.9)	7.69 (+0.7)	7.44 (+1.2)	7.34 (+1.9)	7.69 (+0.7 m/s)	
	Lisardo Milhet	Cuba	7.62 (+0.2)	7.46 (+1.2)	7.66 (+0.9)	7.48 (+1.2)	7.55 (+1.7)	x	7.66 (+0.9 m/s)	Guest
5	Osvaldo Frigerio	Argentina	7.42 (+0.5)	7.39 w (+2.1)	7.49 (+1.9)	7.33 (+1.0)	7.31 (+1.3)	7.20 (+0.6)	7.49 (+1.9 m/s)	
6	Jailto Bonfim	Brazil	x	x	6.45 (+0.6)	7.37 (+0.6)	7.15 (+2.0)	x	7.37 (+0.6 m/s)	
7	Carlos Medeiros	Portugal	x	x	x	x	7.01 (+1.3)	7.11 (+0.7)	7.11 (+0.7 m/s)	

=== Triple jump ===
Final – 27 September

Rank	Name	Nationality	Attempts						Result	Notes
Rank	Name	Nationality	1	2	3	4	5	6	Result	Notes
1st place, gold medalist(s)	Héctor Marquetti	Cuba	x	16.26 (+1.0)	x	x	x	15.91 (+0.9)	16.26 (+1.0 m/s)	
2nd place, silver medalist(s)	Jorge Reina	Cuba	16.25 (+0.6)	16.25 (+1.2)	16.22 (+0.6)	x	x	16.14 (+1.6)	16.25 (+0.6 m/s)	
3rd place, bronze medalist(s)	José Leitão	Portugal	15.45 (+0.4)	15.24 (+1.1)	15.02 (+0.9)	x	x	15.35 (+1.0)	15.45 (+0.4 m/s)	
4	José Quiñaliza	Ecuador	14.48 (+1.2)	14.48 (+1.0)	15.36 (+0.7)	15.14 (+0.7)	15.32 (+1.3)	14.48 (+1.5)	15.36 (+0.7 m/s)	

=== Shot put ===
Final – 27 September

Rank	Name	Nationality	Attempts						Result	Notes
Rank	Name	Nationality	1	2	3	4	5	6	Result	Notes
1st place, gold medalist(s)	Gert Weil	Chile	19.45	x	19.82	x	19.61	x	19.82	
2nd place, silver medalist(s)	Paul Ruiz	Cuba	18.24	x	x	–	–	–	18.24	
3rd place, bronze medalist(s)	Adilson Oliveira	Brazil	17.29	17.01	17.54	17.59	17.33	18.02	18.02	
4	Narciso Boué	Cuba	x	16.90	17.59	x	17.50	17.61	17.61	
5	Gerardo Carucci	Argentina	16.03	x	15.41	14.98	x	x	16.03	

=== Discus throw ===
Final – 28 September

Rank	Name	Nationality	Attempts						Result	Notes
Rank	Name	Nationality	1	2	3	4	5	6	Result	Notes
1st place, gold medalist(s)	Roberto Moya	Cuba	53.72	56.74	55.70	57.64	x	59.04	59.04	
2nd place, silver medalist(s)	Sinesio Garrachón	Spain	55.10	57.18	57.70	57.52	56.20	56.42	57.70	
3rd place, bronze medalist(s)	Raúl Calderón	Cuba	55.30	55.60	x	x	55.82	x	55.82	
4	Carlos Brynner	Argentina	x	52.82	53.70	x	52.30	54.10	54.10	
5	Gerardo Carucci	Argentina	x	44.88	x	46.84	44.34	43.62	46.84	

=== Hammer throw ===
Final – 28 September

Rank	Name	Nationality	Attempts						Result	Notes
Rank	Name	Nationality	1	2	3	4	5	6	Result	Notes
1st place, gold medalist(s)	Raúl Jiméno	Spain	66.90	x	–	62.14	–	–	66.90	
2nd place, silver medalist(s)	Francisco Soria	Cuba	x	61.14	62.10	x	x	64.10	64.10	
3rd place, bronze medalist(s)	Pedro Rivail Atílio	Brazil	x	x	x	x	x	63.10	63.10	
4	Vicente Sánchez	Cuba	61.76	62.36	x	61.20	60.24	61.70	62.36	
5	Andrés Charadía	Argentina	x	58.38	x	x	59.20	x	59.20	
6	Daniel Gómez	Argentina	54.00	54.12	58.34	57.64	x	57.24	58.34	
7	Guillermo Guzmán	Mexico	54.70	x	53.58	x	x	x	54.70	

=== Javelin throw ===
Final – 27 September

Rank	Name	Nationality	Attempts						Result	Notes
Rank	Name	Nationality	1	2	3	4	5	6	Result	Notes
1st place, gold medalist(s)	Ramón González	Cuba	74.60	71.04	70.20	x	76.38	x	76.38	
2nd place, silver medalist(s)	Reinaldo Patterson	Cuba	70.64	67.70	69.30	67.80	69.02	72.12	72.12	
3rd place, bronze medalist(s)	Carlos Cunha	Portugal	63.42	62.12	60.70	63.62	64.84	63.42	64.84	

=== 20 kilometers walk ===
Final – 28 September

Rank	Name	Nationality	Time	Notes
1st place, gold medalist(s)	Marcelino Colín	Mexico	1:33:04	
2nd place, silver medalist(s)	Rolando Flores	Cuba	1:37:02	
3rd place, bronze medalist(s)	Edel Oliva	Cuba	1:40:13	
4	Miguel Ángel Prieto	Spain	1:42:26	
5	Jorge Horacio Yannone	Argentina	1:44:15	
6	Luis Canelo	Nicaragua	1:47:56	
7	Leonel Ramos	Panama	1:53:33	

=== 4 × 100 meters relay ===
Final – 28 September

Rank	Nation	Competitors	Time	Notes
1st place, gold medalist(s)	Brazil	Jailto Bonfim; Katsuhiko Nakaia; Arnaldo da Silva; Robson da Silva	39.30	
2nd place, silver medalist(s)	Cuba	Ricardo Chacón; Osvaldo Lara; Sergio Querol; Andrés Simón	39.46	
3rd place, bronze medalist(s)	Spain	Florencio Gascón; Juan José Prado; Carlos Sala; José Javier Arqués	40.15	
4	Peru	Moisés del Castillo; Óscar Fernández; Giorgio Mautino; Marco Mautino	41.40	
5	Argentina	Osvaldo Frigerio; Federico Cohen; Carlos Varas; Oscar Barrionuevo	41.69	

=== 4 × 400 meters relay ===
Final – 28 September

Rank	Nation	Competitors	Time	Notes
1st place, gold medalist(s)	Spain	Juan José Prado; Cayetano Cornet; José Alonso; Antonio Sánchez	3:08.54	
2nd place, silver medalist(s)	Cuba	José Duany; Francisco Velazco; Jorge Valentín; Roberto Hernández	3:09.09	
3rd place, bronze medalist(s)	Peru	Marco Mautino; Alberto Isu; Ramiro Quintana; Moisés del Castillo	3:17.12	

== Women's results ==
=== 100 meters ===
Heat 1 – 27 September
Wind: -1.5 m/s

Rank	Name	Nationality	Time	Notes
1	Sheila de Oliveira	Brazil	12.05	Q
2	Alma Vázquez	Mexico	12.08	Q
3	Lourdes Valdor	Spain	12.09	Q
4	Claudia Acerenza	Uruguay	12.22	q
5	Idania Pino	Cuba	12.33	
6	Marisol García	Nicaragua	12.35	

Heat 2 – 27 September
Wind: +1.5 m/s

Rank	Name	Nationality	Time	Notes
1	Blanca Lacambra	Spain	11.90	Q
2	Maria Aparecida Correa	Brazil	12.14	Q
3	Soledad Acerenza	Uruguay	12.30	Q
4	Deborah Bell	Argentina	12.30	q
5	María Zamora	Cuba	12.34	
6	Guadalupe García	Mexico	12.40	

Final – 27 September
Wind: +1.3 m/s

Rank	Name	Nationality	Time	Notes
1st place, gold medalist(s)	Alma Vázquez	Mexico	11.76	
2nd place, silver medalist(s)	Blanca Lacambra	Spain	11.80	
3rd place, bronze medalist(s)	Sheila de Oliveira	Brazil	11.93	
4	Lourdes Valdor	Spain	11.97	
5	Maria Aparecida Correa	Brazil	12.09	
6	Claudia Acerenza	Uruguay	12.16	
7	Deborah Bell	Argentina	12.18	
8	Soledad Acerenza	Uruguay	12.25	

=== 200 meters ===
Heat 1 – 28 September
Wind: +1.5 m/s

Rank	Name	Nationality	Time	Notes
1	Sheila de Oliveira	Brazil	24.33	Q
2	Liliana Chalá	Ecuador	24.47	Q
3	Soledad Acerenza	Uruguay	24.60	Q
4	Marisol García	Nicaragua	24.95	q
5	Deborah Bell	Argentina	25.28	
6	Luisa Ferrer	Cuba	26.67	

Heat 2 – 28 September
Wind: +1.8 m/s

Rank	Name	Nationality	Time	Notes
1	Ximena Restrepo	Colombia	23.98	Q
2	Susana Armenteros	Cuba	24.14	Q
3	Claudia Acerenza	Uruguay	24.40	Q
4	Alejandra Flores	Mexico	24.75	q
5	Claudiléia dos Santos	Brazil	25.08	
6	Teresa Hortelano	Spain	25.61	

Final – 28 September
Wind: +2.1 m/s

Rank	Name	Nationality	Time	Notes
1st place, gold medalist(s)	Ximena Restrepo	Colombia	23.76 w	
2nd place, silver medalist(s)	Susana Armenteros	Cuba	24.05 w	
3rd place, bronze medalist(s)	Liliana Chalá	Ecuador	24.15 w	
4	Sheila de Oliveira	Brazil	24.25 w	
5	Alejandra Flores	Mexico	24.32 w	
6	Claudia Acerenza	Uruguay	24.49 w	
7	Soledad Acerenza	Uruguay	24.60 w	
8	Marisol García	Nicaragua	24.78 w	

=== 400 meters ===
Heat 1 – 27 September

Rank	Name	Nationality	Time	Notes
1	Ana Fidelia Quirot	Cuba	52.71	Q
2	Esther Lahoz	Spain	55.43	Q
3	María del Carmen Mosegui	Uruguay	55.62	Q
4	Maria João Lopes	Portugal	55.78	

Heat 2 – 27 September

Rank	Name	Nationality	Time	Notes
1	Norfalia Carabalí	Colombia	54.17	Q
2	Cristina Pérez	Spain	55.04	Q
3	Liliana Chalá	Ecuador	55.07	Q
4	Mercedes Álvarez	Cuba	55.46	q
5	Claudia Acerenza	Uruguay	55.49	q
6	Tânia Miranda	Brazil	56.12	

Final – 27 September

Rank	Name	Nationality	Time	Notes
1st place, gold medalist(s)	Ana Fidelia Quirot	Cuba	50.78	
2nd place, silver medalist(s)	Norfalia Carabalí	Colombia	53.38	
3rd place, bronze medalist(s)	Cristina Pérez	Spain	54.33	
4	Liliana Chalá	Ecuador	54.79	
5	Mercedes Álvarez	Cuba	54.96	
6	Esther Lahoz	Spain	55.08	
7	María del Carmen Mosegui	Uruguay	55.46	
8	Claudia Acerenza	Uruguay	55.62	

=== 800 meters ===
Final – 28 September

Rank	Name	Nationality	Time	Notes
1st place, gold medalist(s)	Ana Fidelia Quirot	Cuba	2:00.23	
2nd place, silver medalist(s)	Soraya Telles	Brazil	2:01.55	
3rd place, bronze medalist(s)	Nery McKeen	Cuba	2:03.07	
4	Alejandra Ramos	Chile	2:04.72	
5	Norfalia Carabalí	Colombia	2:06.16	
6	Maite Zúñiga	Spain	2:06.83	
7	Liliana Góngora	Argentina	2:06.86	
8	María del Carmen Mosegui	Uruguay	2:10.83	
9	Leticia Gracia	Mexico	2:12.23	

=== 1500 meters ===
Final – 27 September

Rank	Name	Nationality	Time	Notes
1st place, gold medalist(s)	Alejandra Ramos	Chile	4:22.34	
2nd place, silver medalist(s)	Rosa Oliveira	Portugal	4:23.11	
3rd place, bronze medalist(s)	Asunción Sinobas	Spain	4:23.89	
4	Liliana Góngora	Argentina	4:24.67	
5	Nery McKeen	Cuba	4:25.79	
6	Kriscia García	El Salvador	4:38.54	
7	Idalmis López	Cuba	4:42.77	
8	Aura Morales	Guatemala	4:46.56	
9	Gilda Méndez	Panama	4:52.77	

=== 3000 meters ===
Final – 28 September

Rank	Name	Nationality	Time	Notes
1st place, gold medalist(s)	Asunción Sinobas	Spain	9:36.92	
2nd place, silver medalist(s)	Rosa Oliveira	Portugal	9:38.70	
3rd place, bronze medalist(s)	Carmen Díaz	Spain	9:40.96	
4	Mónica Regonessi	Chile	9:43.81	
5	Sergia Martínez	Cuba	9:44.29	
6	Martha Hernández	Mexico	9:47.75	
7	Kriscia García	El Salvador	9:57.67	
8	Aura Morales	Guatemala	10:12.82	
9	Gilda Méndez	Panama	10:35.90	
10	Emperatriz Wilson	Cuba	10:36.03	

=== 100 meters hurdles ===
Final – 27 September
Wind: +1.9 m/s

Rank	Name	Nationality	Time	Notes
1st place, gold medalist(s)	Odalys Adams	Cuba	13.49	
2nd place, silver medalist(s)	Julieta Rousseau	Cuba	13.66	
3rd place, bronze medalist(s)	Sandra Tavárez	Mexico	14.03	
4	Erondina Barbosa	Brazil	14.05	
5	Susana Jenkins	Argentina	14.34	
	Beatriz Capotosto	Argentina	DNF	

=== 400 meters hurdles ===
Final – 29 September

Rank	Name	Nationality	Time	Notes
1st place, gold medalist(s)	Cristina Pérez	Spain	58.51	
2nd place, silver medalist(s)	Odalys Hernández	Cuba	58.82	
3rd place, bronze medalist(s)	Tania Fernández	Cuba	59.15	
4	Maria do Carmo Fialho	Brazil	1:02.26	
5	Adriana Martínez	Ecuador	1:03.44	
	Alma Vázquez	Mexico	DNF	

=== High jump ===
Final – 28 September

Rank	Name	Nationality	Attempts								Result	Notes
Rank	Name	Nationality	1.60	1.65	1.70	1.76	1.79	1.81	1.84	1.90	Result	Notes
1st place, gold medalist(s)	Silvia Costa	Cuba	–	–	–	xo	–	xo	xo	xxx	1.84	
2nd place, silver medalist(s)	Asunción Morté	Spain	–	–	o	o	o	–	xxx		1.79	
3rd place, bronze medalist(s)	Orlane dos Santos	Brazil	–	–	–	xxo	xxx				1.76	
4	María del Carmen García	Cuba	xo	o	xxx						1.65	

=== Long jump ===
Final – 27 September

Rank	Name	Nationality	Attempts						Result	Notes
Rank	Name	Nationality	1	2	3	4	5	6	Result	Notes
1st place, gold medalist(s)	Eloína Echevarría	Cuba	6.02 (+0.4)	6.22 (+1.3)	6.25 (+1.1)	6.29 (+1.2)	x	6.02 (+1.4)	6.29 (+1.2 m/s)	
2nd place, silver medalist(s)	Niurka Montalvo	Cuba	5.70 (+0.7)	5.70 (+1.4)	6.01 (+1.2)	6.11 (+1.6)	6.00 (+0.3)	5.89 (+0.9)	6.11 (+1.6 m/s)	
	Adelina Polledo	Cuba	x	6.04 (+0.4)	x	x	6.06 (+1.2)	x	6.06 (+1.2 m/s)	Guest
3rd place, bronze medalist(s)	Graciela Acosta	Uruguay	5.93 (−0.6)	5.88 (+1.6)	x	5.69 (+0.7)	5.90 (+1.1)	5.78 (+0.3)	5.93 (−0.6 m/s)	
4	Silvia Murialdo	Argentina	5.18 (+1.0)	5.07 (+1.6)	5.05 (+1.2)	4.95 (+0.4)	–	–	5.18 (+1.0 m/s)	

=== Shot put ===
Final – 27 September

Rank	Name	Nationality	Attempts						Result	Notes
Rank	Name	Nationality	1	2	3	4	5	6	Result	Notes
1st place, gold medalist(s)	Belsy Laza	Cuba	15.77	x	15.81	x	15.93	15.29	15.93	
2nd place, silver medalist(s)	Marcelina Rodríguez	Cuba	x	x	15.03	15.16	15.72	15.22	15.72	
3rd place, bronze medalist(s)	Maria Nilba Fernandes	Brazil	15.21	14.69	14.61	x	14.84	x	15.21	
4	María Isabel Urrutia	Colombia	13.62	14.75	14.08	14.40	x	x	14.75	

=== Discus throw ===
Final – 28 September

Rank	Name	Nationality	Attempts						Result	Notes
Rank	Name	Nationality	1	2	3	4	5	6	Result	Notes
1st place, gold medalist(s)	Rita Álvarez	Cuba	x	53.32	55.62	58.90	x	53.70	58.90	
2nd place, silver medalist(s)	María Isabel Urrutia	Colombia	50.60	x	48.88	56.84	51.92	50.16	56.84	
3rd place, bronze medalist(s)	Bárbara Hechavarría	Cuba	x	52.30	49.94	51.50	x	54.00	54.00	
4	Ángeles Barreiro	Spain	51.62	x	51.44	50.34	x	x	51.62	
5	Mora Marín	Mexico	x	x	38.14	37.54	35.68	x	38.14	

=== Javelin throw ===
Final – 27 September

Rank	Name	Nationality	Attempts						Result	Notes
Rank	Name	Nationality	1	2	3	4	5	6	Result	Notes
1st place, gold medalist(s)	María Caridad Colón	Cuba	58.48	60.14	x	61.80	58.60	60.70	61.80	
2nd place, silver medalist(s)	Dulce Margarita García	Cuba	52.02	x	55.38	x	59.60	59.02	59.60	
	Iris Degrasse	Cuba	x	53.32	53.90	x	53.94	56.12	56.12	Guest
3rd place, bronze medalist(s)	Sueli dos Santos	Brazil	47.90	x	47.60	48.18	x	52.34	52.34	
4	María Carmen González	Puerto Rico	50.20	x	x	50.38	50.00	x	50.38	
5	Natividad Vizcaíno	Spain	49.32	x	x	46.14	x	x	49.32	
6	Sonia Favre	Argentina	41.20	x	41.00	x	x	x	41.20	

=== 4 × 100 meters relay ===
Final – 28 September

Rank	Nation	Competitors	Time	Notes
1st place, gold medalist(s)	Mexico	Sandra Tavárez; Alma Vázquez; Alejandra Flores; Guadalupe García	45.95	
2nd place, silver medalist(s)	Brazil	Maria Aparecida Correa; Claudiléia dos Santos; Celia da Costa; Sheila de Oliveira	46.22	
3rd place, bronze medalist(s)	Cuba	Julieta Rousseau; Luisa Ferrer; Susana Armenteros; María Zamora	46.29	
4	Uruguay	Graciela Acosta; Virginia Guerra; Soledad Acerenza; Claudia Acerenza	47.58	

=== 4 × 400 meters relay ===
Final – 28 September

Rank	Nation	Competitors	Time	Notes
1st place, gold medalist(s)	Cuba	Mercedes Álvarez; Odalys Hernández; Nery McKeen; Ana Fidelia Quirot	3:33.70	
2nd place, silver medalist(s)	Spain	Esther Lahoz; Montserrat Pujol; Cristina Pérez; Blanca Lacambra	3:36.82	
3rd place, bronze medalist(s)	Mexico	Alejandra Flores; Guadalupe García; Leticia Gracia; Alma Vázquez	3:44.71	
4	Brazil	Tânia Miranda; Celia da Costa; Elba Barbosa; Maria do Carmo Fialho	3:45.34	
5	Uruguay	Virginia Guerra; Soledad Acerenza; María del Carmen Mosegui; Claudia Acerenza	3:54.14	
