= 1988 Ibero-American Championships in Athletics – Results =

These are the results of the 1988 Ibero-American Championships in Athletics which took place from 22 to 24 July 1988 at Estadio Olímpico in Mexico City, Mexico.

Different versions of the sprint results were published, because the fully automatic electronic timing system was malfunctioning. The first version displayed below on the left hand side was officially used to determine the athletes qualifying for the finals (best times, q). Later, there was a second version (not displayed). In December 1988, British statistician Richard Hymans published a revised version for the IAAF and the ATFS where many times were corrected. These numbers are displayed below in parentheses. Finally, there were a couple of hand timing results (Heat 1, 110m hurdles men, Heat 1 and 2 200m women; also displayed below in parentheses), because the officials noticed a defect in the electronic timing system during the event.

== Men's results ==
=== 100 meters ===
Heat 1 – 22 July
Wind: +0.7 m/s

Rank	Name	Nationality	Time	Notes
1	Arnaldo da Silva	Brazil	10.10 (10.12)	Q
2	Enrique Talavera	Spain	10.23 (10.24)	Q
3	Carlos Moreno	Chile	10.24 (10.25)	q
4	Luis Cunha	Portugal	10.36	
5	Eduardo Nava	Mexico	10.43	
6	Marco Mautino	Peru	10.60	
7	Francisco Colorado	El Salvador	10.89	

Heat 2 – 22 July
Wind: +2.7 m/s

Rank	Name	Nationality	Time	Notes
1	Leandro Peñalver	Cuba	9.98 (9.99) w	Q
2	José Javier Arqués	Spain	10.00 (10.01) w	Q
3	Marcos Belizaire	Panama	10.35 w	q
4	Pedro Curvelo	Portugal	10.38 w	
5	Vladimir Samayoa	Guatemala	10.49 w	
6	Federico Cohen	Argentina	10.63 w	
7	Michael Pearson	Costa Rica	10.81 w	
8	René Murillo	El Salvador	10.96 w	

Heat 3 – 22 July
Wind: +1.6 m/s

Rank	Name	Nationality	Time	Notes
1	Robson da Silva	Brazil	9.99 (10.00)	Q
2	Andrés Simón	Cuba	10.12 (10.13)	Q
3	Antonio Ruiz	Mexico	10.49	
4	Fernando Espinoza	Ecuador	10.50	
5	Miguel Soto	Puerto Rico	10.53	
6	Giorgio Mautino	Peru	10.72	
7	Elgin Eligio	Guatemala	10.79	

Final – 22 July
Wind: +1.2 m/s

Rank	Name	Nationality	Time	Notes
1st place, gold medalist(s)	Robson da Silva	Brazil	10.08	
2nd place, silver medalist(s)	Leandro Peñalver	Cuba	10.12	
3rd place, bronze medalist(s)	Arnaldo da Silva	Brazil	10.13	
4	José Javier Arqués	Spain	10.27	
5	Andrés Simón	Cuba	10.31	
6	Enrique Talavera	Spain	10.35	
7	Carlos Moreno	Chile	10.52	
8	Marcos Belizaire	Panama	10.59	

Extra – 22 July
Wind: 0.0 m/s

Rank	Name	Nationality	Time	Notes
1	Ricardo Chacón	Cuba	10.36	
2	Luis Barroso	Portugal	10.50	
3	Fernando Damasio	Portugal	10.51	
4	Florencio Gascón	Spain	10.58	
5	Valentín Rocandio	Spain	10.58	
6	Katsuhiko Nakaia	Brazil	10.59	
7	Paulo Curvelo	Portugal	10.63	

=== 200 meters ===
Heat 1 – 23 July
Wind: +1.5 m/s

Rank	Name	Nationality	Time	Notes
1	Robson da Silva	Brazil	20.52 (20.53)	Q
2	Edgardo Guilbe	Puerto Rico	20.62	Q
3	Luis Barroso	Portugal	20.64	q
4	Antonio Ruiz	Mexico	21.43	
5	Moisés del Castillo	Peru	21.57	
6	Federico Cohen	Argentina	21.72	
7	Fernando Espinoza	Ecuador	21.94	
8	Michael Pearson	Costa Rica	22.42	

Heat 2 – 23 July
Wind: +1.8 m/s

Rank	Name	Nationality	Time	Notes
1	Roberto Hernández	Cuba	20.64 (20.65)	Q
2	Carles Turró	Spain	20.81 (20.90)	Q
3	José María Beduino	Argentina	21.31	
4	Marco Mautino	Peru	21.38	
5	Marcos Belizaire	Panama	21.48	
6	Alejandro Krauss	Chile	21.58	
7	Vladimir Samayoa	Guatemala	21.87	
8	Rafael Marín	Costa Rica	22.73	

Heat 3 – 23 July
Wind: +0.0 m/s

Rank	Name	Nationality	Time	Notes
1	Leandro Peñalver	Cuba	20.75	Q
2	Cayetano Cornet	Spain	20.97	Q
3	Carlos Moreno	Chile	21.29	q
4	Pedro Curvelo	Portugal	21.31	
5	Miguel Elizondo	Mexico	21.79	
6	Elgin Eligio	Guatemala	21.87	
7	Miguel Soto	Puerto Rico	21.90	

Final – 23 July
Wind: -0.3 m/s

Rank	Name	Nationality	Time	Notes
1st place, gold medalist(s)	Robson da Silva	Brazil	20.04 (20.05)	
2nd place, silver medalist(s)	Leandro Peñalver	Cuba	20.12 (20.22)	
3rd place, bronze medalist(s)	Roberto Hernández	Cuba	20.14 (20.24)	
4	Luis Barroso	Portugal	20.51	
5	Edgardo Guilbe	Puerto Rico	20.52	
6	Cayetano Cornet	Spain	21.01	
7	Carles Turró	Spain	21.10	
8	Carlos Moreno	Chile	21.55	

Extra – 23 July
Wind: +0.0 m/s

Rank	Name	Nationality	Time	Notes
1	Luis Cunha	Portugal	20.71	PB
2	Sergio Querol	Cuba	20.96	
3	Antonio Sánchez	Spain	21.37	
4	Giorgio Mautino	Peru	21.77	

=== 400 meters ===
Heat 1 – 22 July

Rank	Name	Nationality	Time	Notes
1	Gérson de Souza	Brazil	45.72 (45.73)	Q
2	Jorge Valentín	Cuba	45.90 (45.91)	Q
3	Cayetano Cornet	Spain	46.12	q
4	José María Beduino	Argentina	47.16	
5	Alvaro Silva	Portugal	47.41	
6	Renán Román	Costa Rica	50.42	
7	Jorge Fidel Ponce	Honduras	52.54	

Heat 2 – 22 July

Rank	Name	Nationality	Time	Notes
1	Roberto Hernández	Cuba	46.17	Q
2	Jesús Malavé	Venezuela	46.39	Q
3	Carlos Morales	Chile	46.40	q, PB
4	Antonio Sánchez	Spain	47.06	
5	Raymundo Escalante	Mexico	47.46	
6	Moisés del Castillo	Peru	47.79	
7	Aurelio Mancheno	Ecuador	48.14	

Heat 3 – 22 July

Rank	Name	Nationality	Time	Notes
1	Sérgio Menezes	Brazil	46.08	Q
2	Alejandro Krauss	Chile	46.68	Q
3	Felipe Lomba	Portugal	46.72	
4	Henry Aguiar	Venezuela	47.14	
5	Giovanni García	El Salvador	51.82	
	Luis Karim Toledo	Mexico	DQ	

Final – 22 July

Rank	Name	Nationality	Time	Notes
1st place, gold medalist(s)	Roberto Hernández	Cuba	44.45 (44.44)	
2nd place, silver medalist(s)	Gérson de Souza	Brazil	45.28	
3rd place, bronze medalist(s)	Jesús Malavé	Venezuela	45.61	
4	Cayetano Cornet	Spain	45.62	
5	Jorge Valentín	Cuba	46.38	
6	Carlos Morales	Chile	47.01	
7	Alejandro Krauss	Chile	47.98	
	Sérgio Menezes	Brazil	DQ	

Extra – 22 July

Rank	Name	Nationality	Time	Notes
1	Félix Stevens	Cuba	45.94	
2	Lázaro Martínez	Cuba	46.17	
3	Ángel Heras	Spain	46.49	
4	Manuel Moreno	Spain	46.75	
5	Aaron Phillips	Venezuela	47.29	
6	Charles Bodington	Venezuela	48.96	
7	Eugenio Naranjo	Ecuador	49.46	

=== 800 meters ===
Heat 1 – 23 July

Rank	Name	Nationality	Time	Notes
1	Mauricio Hernández	Mexico	1:50.72	Q
2	Colomán Trabado	Spain	1:51.12	Q
3	Luis Migueles	Argentina	1:51.61	q
4	Luis Martínez	Guatemala	1:54.06	

Heat 2 – 23 July

Rank	Name	Nationality	Time	Notes
1	Manuel José Balmaceda	Chile	1:52.53	Q
2	José Arconada	Spain	1:53.49	Q
3	Reynaldo Camacho	Peru	1:53.68	q
4	Fabián Almeida	Ecuador	1:54.28	
5	Miguel Rodríguez	Puerto Rico	1:58.67	

Heat 3 – 23 July

Rank	Name	Nationality	Time	Notes
1	Luis Karim Toledo	Mexico	1:48.66	Q
2	Héctor Herrera	Cuba	1:50.89	Q
3	Diego Porras	Costa Rica	1:54.41	
4	Jorge Irizarri	Puerto Rico	1:54.77	
5	Giovanni García	El Salvador	1:57.50	
6	Sergio Vega	Costa Rica	2:00.16	

Final – 24 July

Rank	Name	Nationality	Time	Notes
1st place, gold medalist(s)	Colomán Trabado	Spain	1:47.16	
2nd place, silver medalist(s)	Mauricio Hernández	Mexico	1:47.38	
3rd place, bronze medalist(s)	Manuel José Balmaceda	Chile	1:47.66	
4	Luis Karim Toledo	Mexico	1:47.96	
5	Héctor Herrera	Cuba	1:49.08	
6	Luis Migueles	Argentina	1:52.34	
7	José Arconada	Spain	1:56.44	
8	Reynaldo Camacho	Peru	2:01.26	

=== 1500 meters ===
Final – 22 July

Rank	Name	Nationality	Time	Notes
1st place, gold medalist(s)	Manuel Pancorbo	Spain	3:52.11	
2nd place, silver medalist(s)	Adelino Hidalgo	Spain	3:53.10	
3rd place, bronze medalist(s)	Mauricio Hernández	Mexico	3:53.19	
4	José López	Venezuela	3:53.75	
5	Héctor Pérez	Mexico	3:59.44	
6	Luis Martínez	Guatemala	4:04.29	
7	Sergio Vega	Costa Rica	4:10.11	
8	Wilfredo Ayala	El Salvador	4:21.88	

=== 5000 meters ===
Final – 24 July

Rank	Name	Nationality	Time	Notes
1st place, gold medalist(s)	Arturo Barrios	Mexico	14:10.72	
2nd place, silver medalist(s)	Mauricio González	Mexico	14:25.78	
3rd place, bronze medalist(s)	Antonio Serrano	Spain	14:41.75	
4	Juan Carlos Paul	Spain	14:53.59	
5	Ángel Rodríguez	Cuba	15:35.86	
6	Jorge Aguilar	Costa Rica	16:00.78	
7	Mario Amaya Vázquez	El Salvador	17:51.16	

=== 10,000 meters ===
Final – 22 July

Rank	Name	Nationality	Time	Notes
1st place, gold medalist(s)	Jesús Herrera	Mexico	29:51.09	
2nd place, silver medalist(s)	Manuel Vera	Mexico	30:42.69	
3rd place, bronze medalist(s)	Franklin Tenorio	Ecuador	31:50.60	
4	Jorge Aguilar	Costa Rica	32:52.24	

=== Marathon ===
Final – 23 July

Rank	Name	Nationality	Time	Notes
1st place, gold medalist(s)	Filemon López	Mexico	2:23:59	
2nd place, silver medalist(s)	Wilson Pérez	Ecuador	2:24:27	
3rd place, bronze medalist(s)	Radamés González	Cuba	2:28:25	
4	Héctor Chávez	Mexico	2:35:29	
5	Félix Bolos	Guatemala	2:36:16	
6	Juan Antonio García	Spain	2:39:14	

=== 3000 meters steeplechase ===
Final – 23 July

Rank	Name	Nationality	Time	Notes
1st place, gold medalist(s)	Martín Fiz	Spain	9:05.21	
2nd place, silver medalist(s)	Mauricio Fabián	Mexico	9:06.11	
3rd place, bronze medalist(s)	Germán Silva	Mexico	9:14.45	
4	Carmelo Ríos	Puerto Rico	9:24.44	
5	Alejandro Juárez	El Salvador	9:54.34	

=== 110 meters hurdles ===
Heat 1 – 22 July
Wind: +0.8 m/s

Rank	Name	Nationality	Time	Notes
1	Emilio Valle	Cuba	13.54 (13.6)	Q
2	Carlos Sala	Spain	13.71 (13.8)	Q
3	Joilto Bonfim	Brazil	14.14 (14.2)	Q
4	Carlos Varas	Argentina	14.76 (14.8)	
5	Jorge Guevara	Mexico	14.80 (14.8)	
6	Ángel Díaz	Guatemala	14.98 (15.0)	

Note: See introduction above for a discussion of the timing problems.

Heat 2 – 22 July
Wind: +0.8 m/s

Rank	Name	Nationality	Time	Notes
1	Javier Moracho	Spain	13.60	Q
2	Elvis Cedeño	Venezuela	13.62	Q
3	Lyndon Campos	Brazil	13.65	Q
4	Roberto Carmona	Mexico	13.81	q
5	João Lima	Portugal	13.84	q
6	Javier del Río	Peru	14.32	

Final – 22 July
Wind: +0.0 m/s

Rank	Name	Nationality	Time	Notes
1st place, gold medalist(s)	Emilio Valle	Cuba	13.71	
2nd place, silver medalist(s)	Carlos Sala	Spain	13.80	
3rd place, bronze medalist(s)	Javier Moracho	Spain	13.83	
4	Lyndon Campos	Brazil	13.91 (13.90)	
5	Joilto Bonfim	Brazil	13.93 (13.92)	
6	Elvis Cedeño	Venezuela	14.08	
7	Roberto Carmona	Mexico	14.48	
8	João Lima	Portugal	14.55	

=== 400 meters hurdles ===
Heat 1 – 24 July

Rank	Name	Nationality	Time	Notes
1	Domingo Cordero	Puerto Rico	49.97 (49.92)	Q
2	Antonio Smith	Venezuela	50.96	Q
3	Jesús Ariño	Spain	51.09	Q
4	Efraín Pedroza	Mexico	51.45	q
5	Alberto Izu	Peru	53.13	

Heat 2 – 24 July

Rank	Name	Nationality	Time	Notes
1	Antônio Ferreira	Brazil	50.27	Q
2	José Alonso	Spain	50.47	Q
3	Enrique Navas	Mexico	51.35	Q
4	Francisco Velazco	Cuba	52.25	q
5	Getulio Echandía	Puerto Rico	52.68	
6	Jorge Fidel Ponce	Honduras	56.22	

Final – 24 July

Rank	Name	Nationality	Time	Notes
1st place, gold medalist(s)	José Alonso	Spain	49.21 (49.20)	
2nd place, silver medalist(s)	Domingo Cordero	Puerto Rico	49.66 (49.61)	
3rd place, bronze medalist(s)	Antônio Ferreira	Brazil	50.12	
4	Jesús Ariño	Spain	50.65	
5	Efraín Pedroza	Mexico	51.08	
6	Antonio Smith	Venezuela	51.18	
7	Enrique Navas	Mexico	51.19	
8	Francisco Velazco	Cuba	51.27	

=== High jump ===
Final – 23 July

Rank	Name	Nationality	Result	Notes
1st place, gold medalist(s)	Javier Sotomayor	Cuba	2.35	
2nd place, silver medalist(s)	Juan Francisco Centelles	Cuba	2.31	
3rd place, bronze medalist(s)	Fernando Pastoriza	Argentina	2.25	
4	Antonio Burgos	Puerto Rico	2.20	
5	Fernando Moreno	Argentina	2.20	
6	José Luís Mendes	Brazil	2.10	
7	Milton Riitano	Brazil	2.10	
8	Jorge Martínez	Mexico	2.10	
9	Santiago Lozada	Peru	2.00	
10	Elbio Pelloni	Uruguay	1.95	
11	Fernando Valiente	Peru	1.95	
12	Roger Manzur	El Salvador	1.90	

=== Pole vault ===
Final – 24 July

Rank	Name	Nationality	Result	Notes
1st place, gold medalist(s)	Alberto Ruiz	Spain	5.30	
2nd place, silver medalist(s)	Javier García	Spain	5.30	
3rd place, bronze medalist(s)	Efraín Meléndez	Puerto Rico	5.00	
4	Miguel Escoto	Mexico	4.90	
5	Elson de Souza	Brazil	4.80	
6	Renato Bortolocci	Brazil	4.80	
7	Edgar Díaz	Puerto Rico	4.70	
8	Guillermo Salgado	Mexico	4.20	
9	Lucas Miranda	El Salvador	4.20	
	Oscar Veit	Argentina	NM	
	Roger Manzur	El Salvador	NM	

=== Long jump ===
Final – 22 July

Rank	Name	Nationality	Result	Notes
1st place, gold medalist(s)	Jaime Jefferson	Cuba	8.37 (+0.2 m/s)	
2nd place, silver medalist(s)	Ubaldo Duany	Cuba	8.18 (+1.2 m/s)	
3rd place, bronze medalist(s)	Antonio Corgos	Spain	8.08 (0.0 m/s)	
4	Ángel Tovar	Venezuela	7.85 (+1.9 m/s)	
5	Olivier Cadier	Brazil	7.77	
6	Carlos Casar	Mexico	7.64	
7	Ray Quiñones	Puerto Rico	7.54	
8	José Luis Leitão	Portugal	7.38	
9	Elmer Williams	Puerto Rico	7.33	
10	Fernando Valiente	Peru	7.28	
11	Darío Ruiz	Mexico	7.21	
12	Ricardo Valiente	Peru	7.17	
13	Vincent Parks	Costa Rica	6.72	
14	Francisco Colorado	El Salvador	6.08	

=== Triple jump ===
Final – 24 July

Rank	Name	Nationality	Result	Notes
1st place, gold medalist(s)	Juan Miguel López	Cuba	16.98	
2nd place, silver medalist(s)	Ernesto Torres	Puerto Rico	16.84	
3rd place, bronze medalist(s)	Jorge da Silva	Brazil	16.81	
4	Lázaro Betancourt	Cuba	16.53	
5	Abcélvio Rodrigues	Brazil	16.35	
6	José Luis Leitão	Portugal	16.23	
7	Sergio Saavedra	Venezuela	15.94	
8	Roberto Audain	Venezuela	15.92	
9	Francisco Javier Olivares	Mexico	15.75	
10	Darío Ruiz	Mexico	15.38	
11	Ricardo Valiente	Peru	15.38	
12	José Escalera	Puerto Rico	14.97	
13	Vincent Parks	Costa Rica	13.70	
	Osvaldo Vladimir	El Salvador	NM	

=== Shot put ===
Final – 23 July

Rank	Name	Nationality	Result	Notes
1st place, gold medalist(s)	Paul Ruiz	Cuba	19.18	
2nd place, silver medalist(s)	Narciso Boué	Cuba	18.98	
3rd place, bronze medalist(s)	Adilson Oliveira	Brazil	17.68	
4	Samuel Crespo	Puerto Rico	17.34	
5	Gerardo Carucci	Argentina	16.41	
6	Celso Aragón	Colombia	15.03	
7	Carlos Rodríguez	Mexico	14.58	
8	Fernando Alonso	Guatemala	14.55	
9	Jaime Comandari	El Salvador	13.61	

=== Discus throw ===
Final – 24 July

Rank	Name	Nationality	Result	Notes
1st place, gold medalist(s)	Luis Mariano Delís	Cuba	65.20	
2nd place, silver medalist(s)	Juan Martínez	Cuba	63.72	
3rd place, bronze medalist(s)	José de Souza	Brazil	56.16	
4	José Carlos Jacques	Brazil	53.16	
5	Paulo Santos	Portugal	52.68	
6	Samuel Crespo	Puerto Rico	48.60	
7	Marcelo Pugliese	Argentina	48.36	
8	Wilfredo Jaimes	Venezuela	47.98	
9	Gerardo Carucci	Argentina	44.64	
10	Guillermo Guzmán	Mexico	43.56	
11	Pedro Flores	Mexico	41.92	
12	Fernando Alonso	Guatemala	41.44	
13	Herbert Rodríguez	El Salvador	40.32	

=== Hammer throw ===
Final – 22 July

Rank	Name	Nationality	Result	Notes
1st place, gold medalist(s)	Andrés Charadía	Argentina	68.46	
2nd place, silver medalist(s)	Vicente Sánchez	Cuba	68.00	
3rd place, bronze medalist(s)	Raúl Jimeno	Spain	67.52	
4	Pedro Rivail Atílio	Brazil	63.18	
5	Adrián Marzo	Argentina	61.64	
6	Guillermo Guzmán	Mexico	60.08	
7	Ivam Bertelli	Brazil	57.78	
8	Gerardo Luma	Mexico	42.82	
9	Simón Kafie	El Salvador	35.86	

=== Javelin throw ===
Final – 24 July

Rank	Name	Nationality	Result	Notes
1st place, gold medalist(s)	Ramón González	Cuba	75.56	
2nd place, silver medalist(s)	Juan Gerardo de la Garza	Mexico	73.48	
3rd place, bronze medalist(s)	Julián Sotelo	Spain	69.30	
4	Corrado Caramo	Venezuela	65.04	
5	Jorge Orta	Mexico	64.00	
6	Rodrigo Zelaya	Chile	62.88	
7	Augusto Ingolotti	Paraguay	59.44	
8	Jesús López Ordaz	Argentina	59.42	
9	Juan Enrique Galdámez	El Salvador	56.34	
10	Walter Sosa	Guatemala	56.28	
11	Wilfredo Esquivel	Costa Rica	52.86	

=== 20 kilometers walk ===
Final – 24 July

Rank	Name	Nationality	Time	Notes
1st place, gold medalist(s)	Carlos Mercenario	Mexico	1:21:46.6	
2nd place, silver medalist(s)	Ernesto Canto	Mexico	1:24:29.0	
3rd place, bronze medalist(s)	Daniel Plaza	Spain	1:27:23.0	
4	Carlos Ramones	Venezuela	1:29:47.9	
5	Andrés Marín	Spain	1:30:25.3	
6	Santiago Fonseca	Honduras	1:32:10.7	
7	Omar Guerrero	Venezuela	1:32:10.8	
8	Nelson Funes	Guatemala	1:35:41.4	
9	Rafael Balladares	Honduras	1:36:44.4	
10	Alejandro León Lara	El Salvador	1:41:03.9	

=== 4 × 100 meters relay ===
Heat 1 – 23 July

Rank	Nation	Competitors	Time	Notes
1	Spain	Florencio Gascón; Enrique Talavera; Valentín Rocandio; José Javier Arqués	39.19 (39.20)	Q
2	Brazil	Joilto Bonfim; Lyndon Campos; Sérgio Menezes; Robson da Silva	39.21 (39.20)	Q
3	Mexico	Herman Adam; Eduardo Nava; Antonio Ruiz; Miguel Elizondo	39.74	Q
4	Portugal	Fernando Damasio; Pedro Curvelo; Luis Cunha; Carlos Fernandes^{†}	40.12	q
5	El Salvador	René Murillo; Lucas Oswaldo Miranda; González; Francisco Colorado	42.49	

^{†}: Only the last name is known. The full name was assigned tentatively.

Heat 2 – 23 July

Rank	Nation	Competitors	Time	Notes
1	Cuba	Andrés Simón; Leandro Peñalver; Sergio Querol; Jaime Jefferson	38.89	Q
2	Puerto Rico	Ray Quiñones; Elmer Williams; Edgardo Guilbe; Miguel Soto	40.21	Q
3	Peru	Javier del Río; Marco Mautino; Giorgio Mautino; Moisés del Castillo	41.21	Q

Final – 24 July

Rank	Nation	Competitors	Time	Notes
1st place, gold medalist(s)	Cuba	Andrés Simón; Leandro Peñalver; Sergio Querol; Jaime Jefferson	38.86	
2nd place, silver medalist(s)	Spain	Florencio Gascón; Valentín Rocandio; Enrique Talavera; José Javier Arqués	39.36	
3rd place, bronze medalist(s)	Portugal	Fernando Damasio; Pedro Curvelo; Luis Cunha; Luis Barroso	39:63 (39.3)	
4	Mexico	Herman Adam; Eduardo Nava; Antonio Ruiz; Miguel Elizondo	40.04	
5	Puerto Rico	Rey Quiñones; Elmer Williams; Edgardo Guilbe; Miguel Soto	40.10	
6	Peru	Javier del Río; Marco Mautino; Giorgio Mautino; Moisés del Castillo	40.38	
7	El Salvador	René Murillo; Lucas Oswaldo Miranda; González; Francisco Colorado	43.12	
	Brazil	Joilto Bonfim; Lyndon Campos; Sérgio Menezes; Robson da Silva	DQ	

=== 4 × 400 meters relay ===
Final – 24 July

Rank	Nation	Competitors	Time	Notes
1st place, gold medalist(s)	Cuba	Lázaro Martínez; Jorge Valentín; Félix Stevens; Roberto Hernández	2:59.71	
2nd place, silver medalist(s)	Venezuela	Charles Bodington; Aaron Phillips; Henry Aguiar; Jesús Malavé	3:04.56	
3rd place, bronze medalist(s)	Portugal	Pedro Curvelo; Filipe Lombá; Arnaldo Abrantes; Alvaro Silva	3:05.14	
4	Chile	Carlos Moreno; Manuel Balmaceda; Alejandro Krauss; Carlos Morales	3:08.50	
5	Mexico	Juan José Morales; Eduardo Nava; Raymundo Escalante; Luis Karim Toledo	3:08.59	
6	Costa Rica	Rafael Marín; Michael Pearson; Diego Porras; Renán Román	3:19.19	
	Spain	José Alonso; Cayetano Cornet; Ángel Heras; Manuel Moreno	DNF	

== Women's results ==
=== 100 meters ===
Heat 1 – 22 July
Wind: +1.7 m/s

Rank	Name	Nationality	Time	Notes
1	Sandra Myers	Spain	11.29 (11.30)	Q
3	Claudiléia dos Santos	Brazil	11.51 (11.52)	Q
4	Claudia Acerenza	Uruguay	11.54	q
5	Alejandra Flores	Mexico	11.72	
6	María Soledad Bacarreza	Chile	11.89	

Heat 2 – 22 July
Wind: +2.4 m/s

Rank	Name	Nationality	Time	Notes
1	Cristina Pérez	Spain	11.34	Q
2	Maria Virginia Gomes	Portugal	11.47 (11.48)	Q
3	Alma Vázquez	Mexico	11.54 (11.55)	Q
4	Inês Ribeiro	Brazil	11.56	q
5	Idania Pino	Cuba	11.57	
6	Deborah Bell	Argentina	11.82	
7	Zoila Stewart	Costa Rica	12.07	

Final – 22 July
Wind: +0.0 m/s

Rank	Name	Nationality	Time	Notes
1st place, gold medalist(s)	Sandra Myers	Spain	11.47	
2nd place, silver medalist(s)	Cristina Pérez	Spain	11.59	
3rd place, bronze medalist(s)	Inês Ribeiro	Brazil	11.67	
4	Maria Virginia Gomes	Portugal	11.73	
5	Susana Armenteros	Cuba	11.77	
6	Claudiléia dos Santos	Brazil	11.79	
7	Alma Vázquez	Mexico	11.82	
8	Claudia Acerenza	Uruguay	11.92	

Extra – 22 July
Wind: +0.0 m/s

Rank	Name	Nationality	Time	Notes
1	Yolanda Díaz	Spain	11.77	
2	Lourdes Valdor	Spain	11.84	

=== 200 meters ===
Heat 1 – 23 July
Wind: +0.0 m/s

Rank	Name	Nationality	Time	Notes
1	Blanca Lacambra	Spain	23.91 (24.0)	Q
2	Claudia Acerenza	Uruguay	24.31 (24.4)	Q
3	Rosângela Souza	Brazil	24.64 (24.7)	
4	Liliana Chalá	Ecuador	24.67 (25.2)	
5	Deborah Bell	Argentina	25.10 (25.2)	
6	Idania Pino	Cuba	25.22 (25.3)	

Note: See introduction above for a discussion of the timing problems.

Heat 2 – 23 July
Wind: +0.0 m/s

Rank	Name	Nationality	Time	Notes
1	Maria Magnólia Figueiredo	Brazil	23.56 (23.6)	Q
2	Cristina Pérez	Spain	23.96 (24.0)	Q
3	Susana Armenteros	Cuba	24.18 (24.2)	q
4	Olga Conte	Argentina	24.31 (24.4)	
5	Alejandra Flores	Mexico	24.45 (24.5)	
6	Zoila Stewart	Costa Rica	24.79 (24.8)	

Note: See introduction above for a discussion of the timing problems.

Heat 3 – 23 July
Wind: +0.3 m/s

Rank	Name	Nationality	Time	Notes
1	Ximena Restrepo	Colombia	23.63	Q
2	Maria Virginia Gomes	Portugal	23.82	Q
3	María del Carmen Mosegui	Uruguay	24.21	q
4	Margaret de Jesús	Puerto Rico	24.34	
5	Guadalupe García	Mexico	24.78	
6	María Soledad Bacarreza	Chile	24.82	

Final – 23 July
Wind: +0.0 m/s

Rank	Name	Nationality	Time	Notes
1st place, gold medalist(s)	Blanca Lacambra	Spain	23.04	
2nd place, silver medalist(s)	Cristina Pérez	Spain	23.06	
3rd place, bronze medalist(s)	Maria Magnólia Figueiredo	Brazil	23.35	
4	Ximena Restrepo	Colombia	23.46	
5	Susana Armenteros	Cuba	23.61	
6	Claudia Acerenza	Uruguay	23.78	
7	Maria Virginia Gomes	Portugal	24.03	
8	María del Carmen Mosegui	Uruguay	24.29	

Extra – 23 July
Wind: +0.0 m/s

Rank	Name	Nationality	Time	Notes
1	Inês Ribeiro	Brazil	23.49	
2	Claudiléia dos Santos	Brazil	23.91	
3	Maria João Lopes	Portugal	24.30	
4	Laura de Falco	Argentina	24.33	
5	Soledad Acerenza	Uruguay	24.51	

=== 400 meters ===
Heat 1 – 22 July

Rank	Name	Nationality	Time	Notes
1	Maria Magnólia Figueiredo	Brazil	52.65 (52.66)	Q
2	Maria João Lopes^{†}	Portugal	53.93	Q
3	Esther Lahoz	Spain	55.20	
4	Olga Conte	Argentina	55.37	
5	Guadalupe García	Mexico	56.32	

^{†}: Only the last name is known. The full name was assigned tentatively.

Heat 2 – 22 July

Rank	Name	Nationality	Time	Notes
1	Ana Fidelia Quirot	Cuba	53.27	Q
2	Suzette Montalvão	Brazil	53.64	Q
3	Laura de Falco	Argentina	54.80	q
4	Soledad Acerenza	Uruguay	54.90	
5	Margaret de Jesús	Puerto Rico	57.39	

Heat 3 – 22 July

Rank	Name	Nationality	Time	Notes
1	Blanca Lacambra	Spain	53.59	Q
2	Mercedes Alvarez	Cuba	54.29	Q
3	Liliana Chalá	Ecuador	54.36	q
4	Leticia García	Mexico	56.18	
5	Leonor Isaac	Puerto Rico	1:00.02	

Final – 22 July

Rank	Name	Nationality	Time	Notes
1st place, gold medalist(s)	Ana Fidelia Quirot	Cuba	50.54	
2nd place, silver medalist(s)	Maria Magnólia Figueiredo	Brazil	51.74	
3rd place, bronze medalist(s)	Blanca Lacambra	Spain	52.16	
4	Suzette Montalvão	Brazil	53.72	
5	Laura de Falco	Argentina	54.34	
6	Liliana Chalá	Ecuador	54.49	
7	Mercedes Alvarez	Cuba	55.35	

=== 800 meters ===
Heat 1 – 23 July

Rank	Name	Nationality	Time	Notes
1	Ana Fidelia Quirot	Cuba	2:12.77	Q
2	Rosa Colorado	Spain	2:12.87	Q
3	Rita de Jesus	Brazil	2:13.08	Q
4	Eréndira Villagómez	Mexico	2:13:39	q
5	Daisy Ocasio	Puerto Rico	2:19.45	

Heat 2 – 23 July

Rank	Name	Nationality	Time	Notes
1	Soraya Telles	Brazil	2:11.96	Q
2	Montserrat Pujol	Spain	2:12.63	Q
3	Rafaela Macías	Mexico	2:13.51	Q
4	Stephanie Vega	Puerto Rico	2:13.88	q

Final – 24 July

Rank	Name	Nationality	Time	Notes
1st place, gold medalist(s)	Ana Fidelia Quirot	Cuba	2:01.52	
2nd place, silver medalist(s)	Soraya Telles	Brazil	2:02.00	
3rd place, bronze medalist(s)	Rosa Colorado	Spain	2:03.89	
4	Montserrat Pujol	Spain	2:04.19	
5	Rita de Jesus	Brazil	2:11.37	
6	Rafaela Macías	Mexico	2:14.92	
7	Stephanie Vega	Puerto Rico	2:19.53	

=== 1500 meters ===
Final – 22 July

Rank	Name	Nationality	Time	Notes
1st place, gold medalist(s)	Soraya Telles	Brazil	4:28.91	
2nd place, silver medalist(s)	Aurora Pérez	Spain	4:39.21	
3rd place, bronze medalist(s)	Judith McLaughlin	Guatemala	4:40.43	
4	Rosa María Muñoz	Mexico	4:44.20	
5	Alicia Sánchez	Mexico	4:48.90	
6	Aura Morales	Guatemala	4:56.48	
7	Angelita Lind	Puerto Rico	5:15.68	
8	Ana Silvia Martínez	El Salvador	5:20.13	

=== 3000 meters ===
Final – 24 July

Rank	Name	Nationality	Time	Notes
1st place, gold medalist(s)	Estela Estévez	Spain	9:46.35	
2nd place, silver medalist(s)	Martha Tenorio	Ecuador	9:46.66	
3rd place, bronze medalist(s)	Ruth Jaime	Peru	9:58.99	
4	Begoña Herráez	Spain	9:59.36	
5	María Luisa Servín	Mexico	10:04.09	
6	Rosa María Muñoz	Mexico	10:20.98	
7	Judith McLaughlin	Guatemala	10:12.44	
8	Aura Morales	Guatemala	10:48.47	

=== 10,000 meters ===
Final – 23 July

Rank	Name	Nationality	Time	Notes
1st place, gold medalist(s)	Martha Tenorio	Ecuador	35:33.67	
2nd place, silver medalist(s)	Martha Jiménez	Mexico	36:08.54	
3rd place, bronze medalist(s)	Gloria Ramírez	Mexico	36:23.00	
4	Ruth Jaime	Peru	37:10.96	
5	Sandra Ruales	Ecuador	38:37.21	

=== Marathon ===
Final – 23 July

Rank	Name	Nationality	Time	Notes
1st place, gold medalist(s)	Zoila Muñoz	Ecuador	3:00:42	
2nd place, silver medalist(s)	Gloria Corona	Mexico	3:05:16	
3rd place, bronze medalist(s)	Maribel Durruty	Cuba	3:08:00	
4	Esperanza de Melville	Guatemala	3:30:06	

=== 100 meters hurdles ===
Heat 1 – 23 July
Wind: +0.0 m/s

Rank	Name	Nationality	Time	Notes
1	Odalys Adams	Cuba	13.35	Q
2	Beatriz Capotosto	Argentina	13.77	Q
3	Conceição Geremias	Brazil	14.15	Q
4	Arlene Phillips	Venezuela	14.24	
5	Lucila Carona	Mexico	14.62	
6	Larissa Soto	Guatemala	15.82	
	María Paulina Caroca	Chile	DNS	

Heat 2 – 23 July
Wind: +0.0 m/s

Rank	Name	Nationality	Time	Notes
1	Sandra Tavárez	Mexico	13.63	Q
2	María Fela Torreblanca	Cuba	13.71 (13.72)	Q
3	Juraciara da Silva	Brazil	13.82	Q
4	Carmen Bezanilla	Chile	13.89 (13.90)	q
5	Liliana Derfler	Argentina	13.97	q
6	Amapola Arimany	Guatemala	14.19	

Final – 23 July
Wind: +0.0 m/s

Rank	Name	Nationality	Time	Notes
1st place, gold medalist(s)	Odalys Adams	Cuba	13.28	
2nd place, silver medalist(s)	Sandra Tavárez	Mexico	13.53	
3rd place, bronze medalist(s)	Beatriz Capotosto	Argentina	13.54 (13.55)	
4	Carmen Bezanilla	Chile	13.78 (13.77)	
5	María Fela Torreblanca	Cuba	13.78 (13.77)	
6	Liliana Derfler	Argentina	13.83 (13.80)	
7	Conceição Geremias	Brazil	13.96	
8	Juraciara da Silva	Brazil	14.07	

=== 400 meters hurdles ===
Heat 1 – 24 July

Rank	Name	Nationality	Time	Notes
1	Tania Fernández	Cuba	57.98	Q
2	Liliana Chalá	Ecuador	58.30	Q
3	Maria dos Santos	Brazil	59.16	Q
4	Alma Vázquez	Mexico	1:00.09	q
5	María Paulina Caroca	Chile	1:00.39	q

Heat 2 – 24 July

Rank	Name	Nationality	Time	Notes
1	Maria João Lopes	Portugal	58.84	Q
2	Odalys Hernández	Cuba	59.99	Q
3	Maria do Carmo Fialho	Brazil	1:01.26	Q
4	Violeta Navarro	Mexico	1:01.71	
5	Evelyn Mathieu	Puerto Rico	1:05.92	

Final – 24 July

Rank	Name	Nationality	Time	Notes
1st place, gold medalist(s)	Tania Fernández	Cuba	56.73	
2nd place, silver medalist(s)	Liliana Chalá	Ecuador	57.12	
3rd place, bronze medalist(s)	Maria dos Santos	Brazil	57.64	
4	Maria João Lopes	Portugal	58.06	
5	Odalys Hernández	Cuba	58.83	
6	Alma Vázquez	Mexico	1:00.11	
7	María Paulina Caroca	Chile	1:03.39	
8	Maria do Carmo Fialho	Brazil	1:07.64	

=== High jump ===
Final – 22 July

Rank	Name	Nationality	Result	Notes
1st place, gold medalist(s)	Silvia Costa	Cuba	1.97	
2nd place, silver medalist(s)	Cristina Fink	Mexico	1.88	
3rd place, bronze medalist(s)	Dania Fernández	Cuba	1.85	
4	Orlane dos Santos	Brazil	1.80	
5	Julia Macías	Brazil	1.80	
6	Liliana Derfler	Argentina	1.80	
7	Isabel Mozún	Spain	1.75	
8	Romary Rifka	Mexico	1.60	

=== Long jump ===
Final – 24 July

Rank	Name	Nationality	Result	Notes
1st place, gold medalist(s)	Madeline de Jesús	Puerto Rico	6.96	
2nd place, silver medalist(s)	Niurka Montalvo	Cuba	6.55	
3rd place, bronze medalist(s)	Sandra Myers	Spain	6.38	
4	Adelina Polledo	Cuba	6.27	
5	Conceição Geremias	Brazil	6.14	
6	Maria João Lopes	Portugal	5.94	
7	Gabriela Romero	Mexico	5.86	
8	Rita Slompo	Brazil	5.79	
9	María Romary Rifka	Mexico	5.43	
10	Larissa Soto	Guatemala	5.12	

=== Shot put ===
Final – 24 July

Rank	Name	Nationality	Result	Notes
1st place, gold medalist(s)	Belsy Laza	Cuba	17.23	
2nd place, silver medalist(s)	Lissete Martínez	Cuba	15.93	
3rd place, bronze medalist(s)	Margarita Ramos	Spain	15.51	
4	Berenice da Silva	Uruguay	14.91	
5	María Isabel Urrutia	Colombia	14.83	
6	Marinalva dos Santos	Brazil	14.57	
7	Maria Nilba Fernandes	Brazil	14.02	
8	Sonia Favre	Argentina	13.79	
9	Ángeles Barreiro	Spain	12.46	
10	María del Carmen Rodríguez	Mexico	11.38	

=== Discus throw ===
Final – 22 July

Rank	Name	Nationality	Result	Notes
1st place, gold medalist(s)	Bárbara Hechavarría	Cuba	56.34	
2nd place, silver medalist(s)	Olga Lidia Gómez	Cuba	55.58	
3rd place, bronze medalist(s)	María Isabel Urrutia	Colombia	54.22	
4	Ángeles Barreiro	Spain	53.10	
5	Fátima Germano	Brazil	47.30	
6	Margarita Ramos	Spain	44.94	
7	Marinalva dos Santos	Brazil	44.06	
8	Berenice da Silva	Uruguay	43.56	
9	Elvira Yufra García	Peru	41.92	
10	Lidia de la Cruz	Mexico	40.34	

=== Javelin throw ===
Final – 23 July

Rank	Name	Nationality	Result	Notes
1st place, gold medalist(s)	Herminia Bouza	Cuba	62.48	
2nd place, silver medalist(s)	Dulce Margarita García	Cuba	61.83	
3rd place, bronze medalist(s)	Sueli dos Santos	Brazil	56.10	
4	Marieta Riera	Venezuela	51.80	
5	Mónica Rocha	Brazil	50.18	
6	Sonia Favre	Argentina	46.96	
7	Natalia Toledo	Paraguay	40.66	
8	Noemi Romo	Mexico	36.38	
	Rita Solis	Mexico	NM	
	María Lourdes Ruiz	Nicaragua	NM	
	Luz María Quiñonez	Ecuador	NM	

=== 10,000 meters walk ===
Final – 22 July

Rank	Name	Nationality	Time	Notes
1st place, gold medalist(s)	María de la Luz Colín	Mexico	51:08.1	
2nd place, silver medalist(s)	Graciela Mendoza	Mexico	51:09.8	
3rd place, bronze medalist(s)	Reyes Sobrino	Spain	52:00.4	
4	Morelba Useche	Venezuela	53:28.2	
5	María Magdalena Guzmán	El Salvador	1:00:55.4	

=== 4 × 100 meters relay ===
Final – 24 July

Rank	Nation	Competitors	Time	Notes
1st place, gold medalist(s)	Spain	Sandra Myers; Cristina Pérez; Yolanda Díaz; Lourdes Valdor	44:46 (44.47)	
2nd place, silver medalist(s)	Mexico	Sandra Tavárez; Alma Vázquez; Alejandra Flores; Guadalupe García	45.20	
3rd place, bronze medalist(s)	Brazil	Conceição Geremias; Juraciara da Silva; Claudiléia dos Santos; Inês Ribeiro	45.28	
4	Argentina	Liliana Derfler; Olga Conte; Laura de Falco; Deborah Bell	46.32	

=== 4 × 400 meters relay ===
Final – 24 July

Rank	Nation	Competitors	Time	Notes
1st place, gold medalist(s)	Brazil	Rosângela Souza; Suzette Montalvão; Soraya Telles; Maria Magnólia Figueiredo	3:29:21 (3:29.22)	
2nd place, silver medalist(s)	Spain	Montserrat Pujol; Rosa Colorado; Esther Lahoz; Blanca Lacambra	3:32.54	
3rd place, bronze medalist(s)	Cuba	Mercedes Alvarez; Nelsa María Vinent; Odalys Hernández; Ana Fidelia Quirot	3:32.77	
4	Puerto Rico	Margaret de Jesús; Leonor Isaac; Angelita Lind; Stephanie Vega	3:40.74	
5	Mexico	Violeta Navarro; Leticia García; Eréndira Villagómez; Guadalupe García	3:41.60	
6	Argentina	Deborah Bell; Beatriz Capotosto; Olga Conte; Laura de Falco	3:42.17	
	Uruguay	María del Carmen Mosegui; Virginia Guerra; Claudia Acerenza; Soledad Acerenza	DQ	
