= 1986 Ibero-American Championships in Athletics =

II Ibero-American Championships
- Dates: 27 – 28 September
- Host city: Havana, Cuba
- Venue: Estadio Pedro Marrero
- Events: 36
- Participation: 17 nations
- Records set: 19 championship records

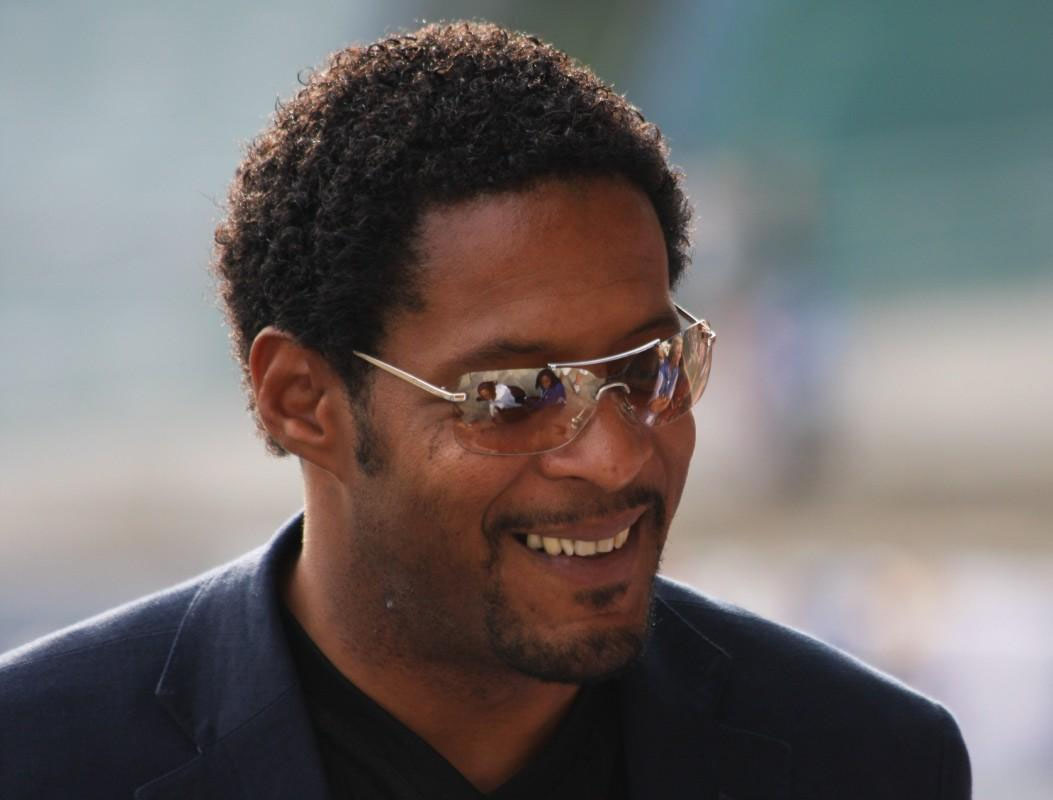
Javier Sotomayor won his first senior international gold medal in the high jump at 18

The 1986 Ibero-American Championships (Spanish: II Campeonato Iberoamericano de Atletismo) was an athletics competition which was held at the Estadio Pedro Marrero in Havana, Cuba from 27 to 28 September 1986. A total of 36 events, comprising 21 men's and 15 women's events, were contested by sixteen countries. It was the second edition of the Ibero-American Championships, and the first to be held in Latin America. The Chilean city of Valparaíso was initially chosen to host the event, but the competition was moved after organisation difficulties. High temperatures at the venue affected athletic performances, particularly in the longer distance events.

The host nation, Cuba, easily topped the table with fifteen gold medals and a total of 43 medals. Spain was the second most successful country (9 golds, 22 in total) and Brazil was third with four golds and fifteen medals overall. The positions of these top three countries remained unchanged from those at the previous edition of the championships in 1983.

Among the notable medallists was Brazilian Robson da Silva, won completed a sprint double and recorded a South American record of 10.02 seconds in the 100 metres. Ana Fidelia Quirot of Cuba won both the women's 400 metres and 800 metres events. Seventeen-year-old Luis Bueno set a world youth record of 8.25 m to win the men's long jump. Another young athlete, 18-year-old high jumper Javier Sotomayor, won his first ever senior gold medal at an international athletics championships. Adauto Domingues of Brazil won the steeplechase gold and a silver in the 5000 m, while Portugal's Rosa Oliveira was twice runner-up in the 1500 metres and 3000 metres events.

The men's marathon race was dropped from the main programme and was instead held as a separate competition – the Ibero American Marathon Championships. Alfonso Abellán was the race winner that year while Manuel Vera and Radamés González were second and third respectively.

== Medal summary ==
=== Men ===
Event	Gold		Silver		Bronze	
100 metres	Robson da Silva (BRA)	10.02 CR AR	Andrés Simón (CUB)	10.19	Ricardo Chacón (CUB)	10.36
200 metres	Robson da Silva (BRA)	20.43 CR	Luís Cunha (POR)	21.08	Antonio Sánchez (ESP)	21.23
400 metres	Félix Stevens (CUB)	45.83 CR	Roberto Hernández (CUB)	46.03	Cayetano Cornet (ESP)	47.03
800 metres	Mauricio Hernández (MEX)	1:48.05 CR	Luis Toledo (MEX)	1:48.81	Luis Migueles (ARG)	1:49.19
1500 metres	José Luis Carreira (ESP)	3:44.93 CR	Andrés Vera (ESP)	3:44.99	Mauricio Hernández (MEX)	3:45.68
5000 metres	Abel Antón (ESP)	13:49.76 CR	Adauto Domingues (BRA)	13:50.36	Elísio Rios (POR)	13:51.34
10,000 metres	Elísio Rios (POR)	29:59.54	Joaquim Pinheiro (POR)	29:59.71	Rolando Vera (ECU)	30:10.05
110 metres hurdles	Carlos Sala (ESP)	13.89	Lyndon Campos (BRA)	13.99	Ángel Bueno (CUB)	14.08
400 metres hurdles	José Alonso (ESP)	49.96	Pablo Squella (CHI)	50.17	Francisco Velazco (CUB)	50.75
3000 metres steeplechase	Adauto Domingues (BRA)	8:31.91	Juan Ramón Conde (CUB)	8:34.08	Ricardo Vera (URU)	8:34.92
4 × 100 m relay	Brazil (BRA); Jailto Santos Bonfim; Katsuhiko Nakaia; Arnaldo de Oliveira Silva; Robson da Silva	39.30 CR	Cuba (CUB); Ricardo Chacón; Osvaldo Lara; Sergio Querol; Andrés Simón	39.46	Spain (ESP); Florencio Gascón; Juan José Prado; Carlos Sala; José Javier Arqués	40.15
4 × 400 m relay	Spain (ESP); Juan José Prado; Cayetano Cornet; José Alonso; Antonio Sánchez	3:08.54	Cuba (CUB); José Duany; Francisco Velazco; Jorge Valentín; Roberto Hernández	3:09.09	Peru (PER); Marco Mautino; Alberto Isu; Ramiro Quintana; Moisés del Castillo	3:17.12
20 km walk	Marcelino Colín (MEX)	1:33:04	Jesús Flores (CUB)	1:37:02	Edel Oliva (CUB)	1:40:13
High jump	Javier Sotomayor (CUB)	2.30 m CR	Francisco Centelles (CUB)	2.18 m	Gustavo Becker (ESP)	2.18 m
Pole vault	Alberto Ruiz (ESP)	5.20 m =CR	Javier García (ESP)	5.20 m =CR	Rubén Camino (CUB)	5.00 m
Long jump	Luis Bueno (CUB)	8.25 m CR	Osvaldo Larrondo (CUB)	7.83 m	Olivier Cadier (BRA)	7.72 m
Triple jump	Héctor Marquetti (CUB)	16.26 m	Jorge Reyna (CUB)	16.25 m	José Leitão (POR)	15.45 m
Shot put	Gert Weil (CHI)	19.82 m CR	Paul Ruiz (CUB)	18.24 m	Adilson Oliveira (BRA)	18.02 m
Discus throw	Roberto Moya (CUB)	59.04 m	Sinesio Garrachón (ESP)	57.70 m	Raúl Calderón (CUB)	55.82 m
Hammer throw	Raúl Jimeno (ESP)	66.90 m	Francisco Soria (CUB)	64.10 m	Pedro Rivail Atílio (BRA)	63.10 m
Javelin throw (new model)	Ramón González (CUB)	76.38 m CR	Reinaldo Patterson (CUB)	72.12 m	Carlos Cunha (POR)	64.84 m

=== Women ===
Event	Gold		Silver		Bronze	
100 metres	Alma Vázquez (MEX)	11.76	Blanca Lacambra (ESP)	11.80	Sheila de Oliveira (BRA)	11.93
200 metres (wind: 2.1 m/s)	Ximena Restrepo (COL)	23.76	Susana Armenteros (CUB)	24.05	Liliana Chalá (ECU)	24.15
400 metres	Ana Fidelia Quirot (CUB)	50.78	Norfalia Carabalí (COL)	53.38	Cristina Pérez (ESP)	54.33
800 metres	Ana Fidelia Quirot (CUB)	2:00.23 CR	Soraya Telles (BRA)	2:01.55	Nery McKeen (CUB)	2:03.07
1500 metres	Alejandra Ramos (CHI)	4:22.34	Rosa Oliveira (POR)	4:23.11	Asunción Sinovas (ESP)	4:23.89
3000 metres	Asunción Sinovas (ESP)	9:36.92	Rosa Oliveira (POR)	9:38.70	Carmen Díaz (ESP)	9:40.96
100 metres hurdles	Odalys Adams (CUB)	13.49	Julieta Rosseaux (CUB)	13.66	Sandra Taváres (MEX)	14.03
400 metres hurdles	Cristina Pérez (ESP)	58.51 CR	Odalys Hernández (CUB)	58.82	Tania Fernández (CUB)	59.15
4×100 metres relay	Mexico (MEX); Sandra Tavárez; Alma Delia Vázquez; Alejandra Flores; Guadalupe García	45.95 CR	Brazil (BRA); Maria Aparecida Correa; Claudiléia Matos Santos; Celia da Costa; Sheila de Oliveira	46.22	Cuba (CUB); Julieta Rousseau; Luisa Ferrer; Susana Armenteros; María Zamora	46.29
4×400 metres relay	Cuba (CUB); Mercedes Álvarez; Odalys Hernández; Nery McKeen; Ana Fidelia Quirot	3:33.70	Spain (ESP); Esther Lahoz; Montserrat Pujol; Cristina Pérez; Blanca Lacambra	3:36.82	Mexico (MEX); Alejandra Flores; Guadalupe García; Leticia Gracia; Alma Delia Vázquez	3:44.71
High jump	Silvia Costa (CUB)	1.84 m CR	Asunción Morte (ESP)	1.79 m	Orlane dos Santos (BRA)	1.76 m
Long jump	Eloína Echevarría (CUB)	6.29 m	Niurka Montalvo (CUB)	6.11 m	Graciela Acosta (URU)	5.93 m
Shot put	Belsis Laza (CUB)	15.93 m CR	Marcelina Rodríguez (CUB)	15.32 m	Maria Fernandes (BRA)	15.21 m
Discus throw	Rita Álvarez (CUB)	58.90 m CR	María Isabel Urrutia (COL)	56.84 m	Bárbara Hechevarría (CUB)	54.00 m
Javelin throw	María Caridad Colón (CUB)	61.80 m CR	Dulce García (CUB)	59.60 m	Sueli dos Santos (BRA)	52.34 m

== Medal table ==
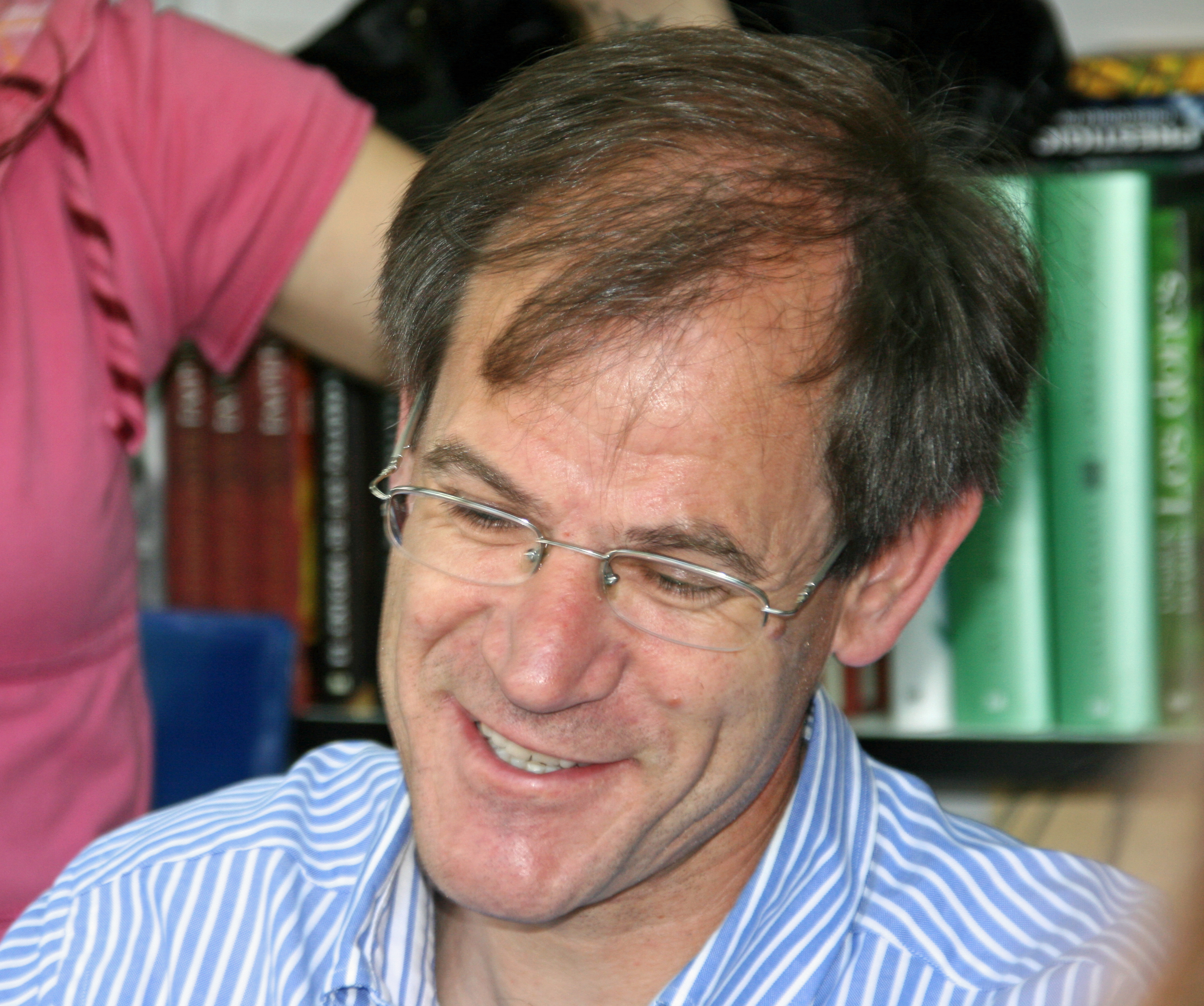
Abel Antón won a gold for Spain in the 5000 metres.

* Host nation (Cuba)

Rank	Nation	Gold	Silver	Bronze	Total
1	Cuba (CUB)*	15	18	10	43
2	Spain (ESP)	9	6	7	22
3	Brazil (BRA)	4	4	7	15
4	Mexico (MEX)	4	1	3	8
5	Chile (CHI)	2	1	0	3
6	Portugal (POR)	1	4	3	8
7	Colombia (COL)	1	2	0	3
8	Ecuador (ECU)	0	0	2	2
8	Uruguay (URU)	0	0	2	2
10	Argentina (ARG)	0	0	1	1
10	Peru (PER)	0	0	1	1
Totals (11 entries)		36	36	36	108

- Note: The final medal count on the official report differs as it includes the results of the Ibero-American Marathon Championship, which was held in Seville on 2 February before the main event. Spain's Alfonso Abellán was the winner, followed by Manuel Vera of Mexico and Cuban Radamés González rounded out the podium.

== Participation ==
Of the twenty-two founding members of the Asociación Iberoamericana de Atletismo, nineteen presented delegations for the second championships (one more than the first edition). Ecuador, Panama, Puerto Rico and Venezuela all took part for the first time. The absent nations were Costa Rica, Honduras and the Dominican Republic. A total of 220 athletes participated in the competition. However, only 200 participating athletes (including some guest athletes) from 17 countries were counted by analysing the official result list. Athletes from Bolivia and Paraguay could not be retrieved. The higher number probably contains coaches and/or officials registered for the event.

- Argentina (22)
- Brazil (22)
- Chile (5)
- Colombia (4)
- Cuba (62)
- Ecuador (4)
- El Salvador (1)
- Guatemala (4)
- Mexico (12)
- Nicaragua (4)
- Panama (4)
- Peru (7)
- Portugal (9)
- Puerto Rico (1)
- Spain (31)
- Uruguay (6)
- Venezuela (2)
