= 1988 Ibero-American Championships in Athletics =

III Ibero-American Championships
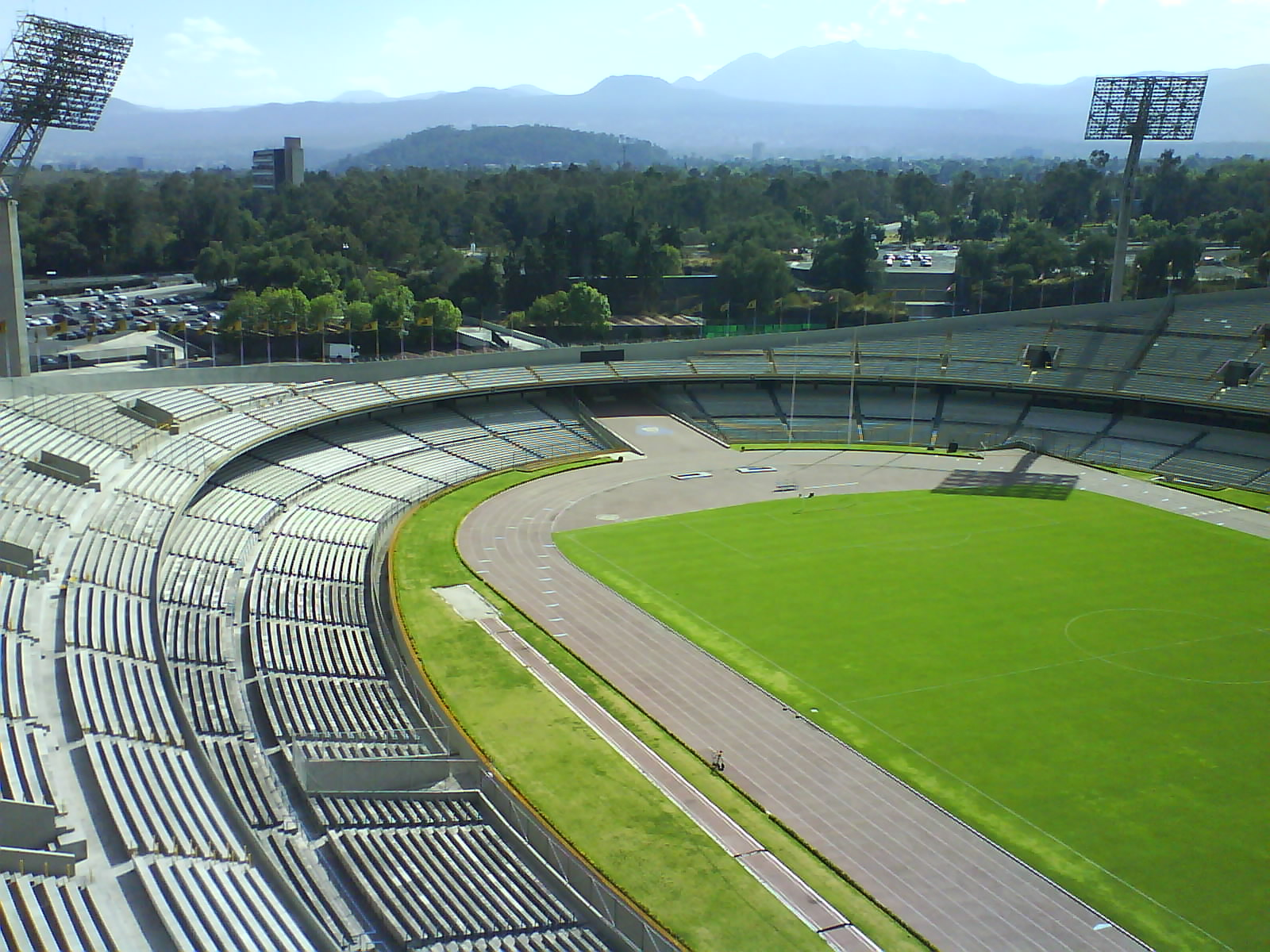
- The host stadium in Mexico (shown here in 2008)
- Dates: 22 – 24 July 1988
- Host city: Mexico City, Mexico
- Venue: Estadio Olímpico Universitario
- Events: 40
- Participation: 371 athletes from 20 nations
- Records set: 26

The 1988 Ibero-American Championships in Athletics (Spanish: III Campeonato Iberoamericano de Atletismo) was the third edition of the international athletics competition between Ibero-American nations which was held in Mexico City, Mexico from 22–24 July. A total of forty events were contested, of which 22 by male and 18 by female athletes. A total of 371 athletes and 20 nations took part in the three-day competition.

All performances were set at high altitude, which aided athletes in most events (compared to performing at lower climes) with the exception of long-distance running events. Three new events were introduced at the 1988 edition of the competition: the women's 10,000 metres, women's marathon and women's 10,000 m race walk. The men's marathon race returned to the Ibero-American Championships after a break in 1986.

Cuba topped the medal table for a third time, winning eighteen gold medals and 34 medals overall. The next best performing nation was Spain, which won nine events and had 28 medals. Mexico, the host nation, edged Brazil into fourth place with its tally of five golds and 19 medals, while the Brazilians had one less gold and two fewer in total.

Three athletes remained undefeated at the championship, taking three straight wins: José Alonso in the men's 400 m hurdles, Alberto Ruiz in the men's pole vault, and Ana Fidelia Quirot in the women's 400 m. In the heats of the men's 100 metres Robson da Silva (who went on to win a 100/200 m double) ran a time of ten seconds flat – a new South American record time.

Ana Fidelia Quirot completed a 400/800 m double. Madeline de Jesús jumped a national record to win the women's long jump and Puerto Rico's sole gold of the tournament. The Cuban women took the top two spots in all the throws, while Spain's women had 1–2 finishes in both the short sprints. The Mexican long-distance athletes excelled at high altitude: the men won the gold and silver medals in the track running and walking events, while the women also claimed the top two spots in the walks.

== Medal summary ==
=== Men ===
Event	Gold		Silver		Bronze	
100 metres	Robson da Silva (BRA)	10.08	Leandro Peñalver (CUB)	10.12	Arnaldo de Oliveira (BRA)	10.13
200 metres	Robson da Silva (BRA)	20.05 CR	Leandro Peñalver (CUB)	20.22	Roberto Hernández (CUB)	20.24
400 metres	Roberto Hernández (CUB)	44.44 CR	Gerson de Souza (BRA)	45.28	Jesús Malavé (VEN)	45.61
800 metres	Colomán Trabado (ESP)	1:47.16 CR	Mauricio Hernández (MEX)	1:47.38	Manuel Balmaceda (CHI)	1:47.66
1500 metres	Manuel Pancorbo (ESP)	3:52.11	Adelino Hidalgo (ESP)	3:53.10	Mauricio Hernández (MEX)	3:53.19
5000 metres	Arturo Barrios (MEX)	14:10.72	Mauricio González (MEX)	14:25.78	Antonio Serrano (ESP)	14:41.75
10,000 metres	Jesús Herrera (MEX)	29:51.09	Manuel Vera (MEX)	30:42.69	Franklin Tenorio (ECU)	31:50.60
110 metres hurdles	Emilio Valle (CUB)	13.71 CR	Carlos Sala (ESP)	13.80	Javier Moracho (ESP)	13.83
400 metres hurdles	José Alonso (ESP)	49.20 CR	Domingo Cordero (PUR)	49.61	Antônio Dias Ferreira (BRA)	50.12
3000 metres steeplechase	Martín Fiz (ESP)	9:05.21	Mauricio Fabián (MEX)	9:06.11	Germán Silva (MEX)	9:14.45
4×100 metres relay	Cuba (CUB); Andrés Simón; Leandro Peñalver; Sergio Querol; Jaime Jefferson	38.86 CR	Spain (ESP); Florencio Gascon; Valentín Rocandio; Enrique Talavera; José Javier Arqués	39.36	Portugal (POR); Fernando Damasio; Pedro Curvelo; Luís Cunha; Luis Barroso	39.63
4×400 metres relay	Cuba (CUB); Lazaro Martínez; Jorge Valentin; Félix Stevens; Roberto Hernández	2:59.71 CR	Venezuela (VEN); Charles Bodington; Aaron Phillips; Henry Aguiar; Jesús Malavé	3:04.56 NR	Portugal (POR); Pedro Curvelo; Filipe Lomba; Arnaldo Abrantes; Alvaro Silva	3:05.14
Marathon	Filemón López (MEX)	2:23:59 CR	Wilson Pérez (ECU)	2:24:27	Radamés González (CUB)	2:28:25
20 km walk	Carlos Mercenario (MEX)	1:21:47 CR	Ernesto Canto (MEX)	1:24:29	Daniel Plaza (ESP)	1:27:23
High jump	Javier Sotomayor (CUB)	2.35 m CR	Francisco Centelles (CUB)	2.31 m	Fernando Pastoriza (ARG)	2.25 m NR
Pole vault	Alberto Ruiz (ESP)	5.30 m CR	Javier García (ESP)	5.30 m CR	Efram Meléndez (PUR)	5.00 m
Long jump	Jaime Jefferson (CUB)	8.37 m CR	Ubaldo Duany (CUB)	8.18 m	Antonio Corgos (ESP)	8.08 m
Triple jump	Juan Miguel López (CUB)	16.98 m CR	Ernesto Torres (PUR)	16.84 m	Jorge da Silva (BRA)	16.81 m
Shot put	Paul Ruiz (CUB)	19.18 m	Marciso Boué (CUB)	18.98 m	Adilson Oliveira (BRA)	17.68 m
Discus throw	Luis Delís (CUB)	65.20 m	Juan Martínez (CUB)	63.72 m	José de Souza (BRA)	56.16 m
Hammer throw	Andrés Charadía (ARG)	68.46 m	Vicente Sánchez (CUB)	68.00 m	Raúl Jimeno (ESP)	67.52 m
Javelin throw	Ramón González (CUB)	75.56 m	Juan de la Garza (MEX)	73.48 m	Julián Sotelo (ESP)	69.30 m

=== Women ===
Event	Gold		Silver		Bronze	
100 metres	Sandra Myers (ESP)	11.47 CR	Cristina Pérez (ESP)	11.59	Inês Ribeiro (BRA)	11.67
200 metres	Blanca Lacambra (ESP)	23.04 CR	Cristina Pérez (ESP)	23.06	Maria Magnólia Figueiredo (BRA)	23.35 ^{†}
400 metres	Ana Fidelia Quirot (CUB)	50.54 CR	Maria Figueirêdo (BRA)	51.74	Blanca Lacambra (ESP)	52.16
800 metres	Ana Fidelia Quirot (CUB)	2:01.52	Soraya Telles (BRA)	2:02.00	Rosa Colorado (ESP)	2:03.89
1500 metres	Soraya Telles (BRA)	4:28.91	Aurora Pérez (ESP)	4:39.21	Judith McLaughlin (GUA)	4:40.43
3000 metres	Estela Estévez (ESP)	9:46.35	Martha Tenorio (ECU)	9:46.66	Ruth Jaime Campos (PER)	9:58.99
10,000 metres	Martha Tenorio (ECU)	35:33.67 CR	Martha Jiménez (MEX)	36:08.54A	Gloria Ramírez (MEX)	36:23.00
100 metres hurdles	Odalys Adams (CUB)	13.28 CR	Sandra Taváres (MEX)	13.53	Beatriz Capotosto (ARG)	13.54
400 metres hurdles	Tania Fernández (CUB)	56.73 CR	Liliana Chalá (ECU)	57.12 NR	Maria dos Santos (BRA)	57.64
4×100 metres relay	Spain (ESP); Sandra Myers; Cristina Pérez; Yolanda Díaz; Lourdes Valdor	44.47 CR	Mexico (MEX); Sandra Tavárez; Alma Delia Vásquez; Alejandra Flores; Guadalupe García	45.20 NR	Brazil (BRA); Conceição Geremias; Juraciara da Silva; Claudiléia Santos; Inês Ribeiro	45.28
4×400 metres relay	Brazil (BRA); Rosângela Souza; Suzette Montalvão; Soraya Telles; Maria Magnólia Figueiredo	3:29.22 CR	Spain (ESP); Montserrat Pujol; Rosa Colorado; Esther Lahoz; Blanca Lacambra	3:32.54	Cuba (CUB); Mercedes Alvarez; Nelsa María Vinent; Odalys Hernández; Ana Fidelia Quirot	3:32.77
Marathon	Zoila Muñoz (ECU)	3:00:42 CR	Gloria Corona (MEX)	3:05:16	Maribel Durruty (CUB)	3:08:00
10,000 m track walk	María Colín (MEX)	51:08.1 CR	Graciela Mendoza (MEX)	51:09.8	María Reyes Sobrino (ESP)	52:00.4
High jump	Silvia Costa (CUB)	1.97 m CR	Cristina Fink (MEX)	1.88 m	Dania Fernández (CUB)	1.85 m
Long jump	Madeline de Jesús (PUR)	6.96 m CR NR	Niurka Montalvo (CUB)	6.55 m	Sandra Myers (ESP)	6.38 m
Shot put	Belsis Laza (CUB)	17.23 m CR	Lissete Martínez (CUB)	15.93 m	Margarita Ramos (ESP)	15.51 m
Discus throw	Bárbara Hechevarría (CUB)	56.34 m	Olga Gómez (CUB)	55.38 m	María Isabel Urrutia (COL)	54.22 m
Javelin throw (old model)	Herminia Bouza (CUB)	62.48 m	Dulce García (CUB)	61.82 m	Sueli dos Santos (BRA)	56.10 m

- ^{†} : GBR Athletics lists Colombia's Ximena Restrepo as the joint bronze medallist in the women's 200 m. However, the official results show Restrepo finished in fourth with a time of 23.46 seconds.

== Medal table ==
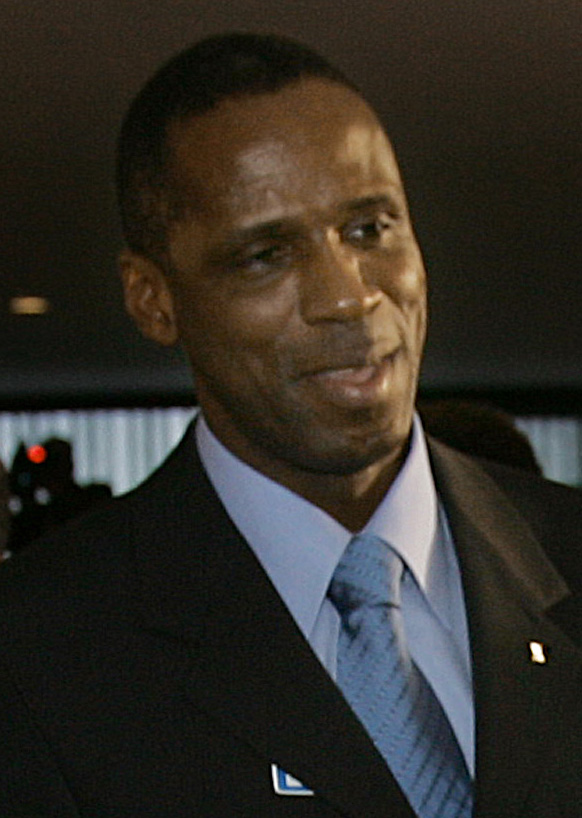
Robson da Silva won two sprint golds for Brazil.

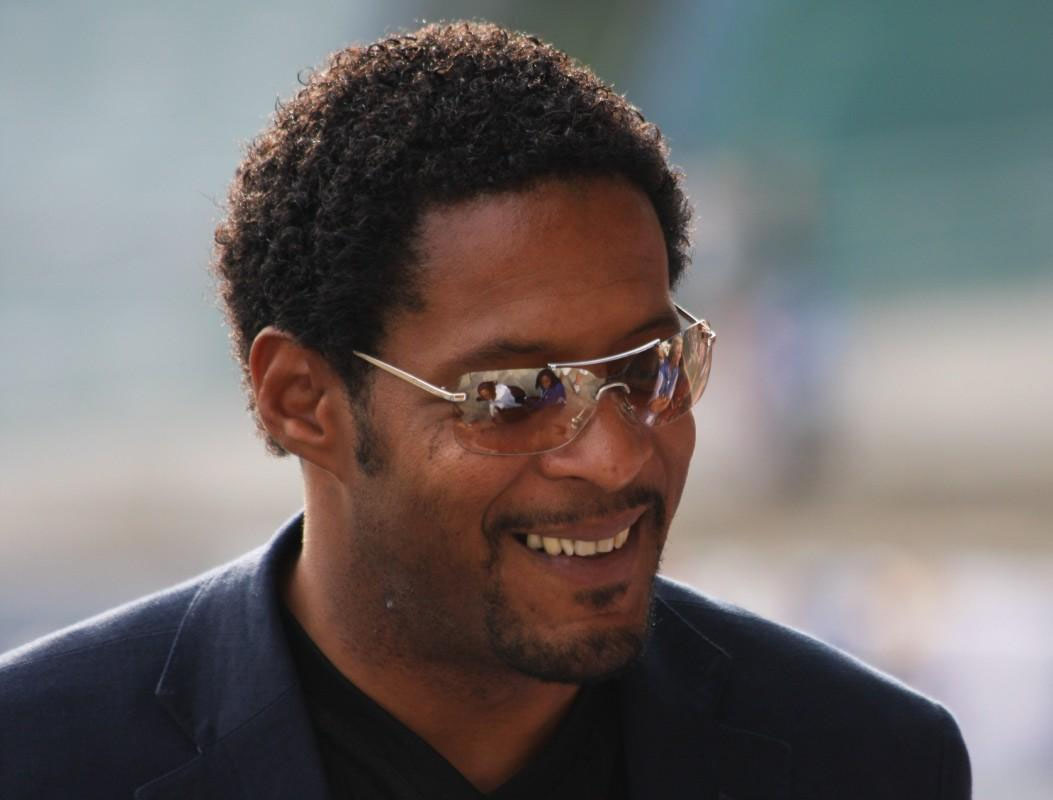
Cuba's Javier Sotomayor retained his men's high jump title from 1986.

* Host nation (Mexico)

Rank	Nation	Gold	Silver	Bronze	Total
1	Cuba (CUB)	18	11	5	34
2	Spain (ESP)	9	8	11	28
3	Mexico (MEX)*	5	12	3	20
4	Brazil (BRA)	4	3	10	17
5	Ecuador (ECU)	2	3	1	6
6	Puerto Rico (PUR)	1	2	1	4
7	Argentina (ARG)	1	0	2	3
8	Venezuela (VEN)	0	1	1	2
9	Portugal (POR)	0	0	2	2
10	Chile (CHI)	0	0	1	1
10	Colombia (COL)	0	0	1	1
10	Guatemala (GUA)	0	0	1	1
10	Peru (PER)	0	0	1	1
Totals (13 entries)		40	40	40	120

== Participation ==
Of the twenty-two members of the Asociación Iberoamericana de Atletismo, twenty presented delegations for the championships. The absent nations were Bolivia and the Dominican Republic. A record high of 371 athletes participated in the championships – more than the previous two editions combined. However, only 344 participating athletes (including some guest athletes) were counted by analysing the official result list. The higher number probably contains coaches and/or officials registered for the event.

- Argentina (18)
- Brazil (39)
- Chile (9)
- Colombia (3)
- Costa Rica (9)
- Cuba (45)
- Ecuador (11)
- El Salvador (17)
- Guatemala (13)
- Honduras (3)
- Mexico (60)
- Nicaragua (1)
- Panama (1)
- Paraguay (2)
- Peru (11)
- Portugal (14)
- Puerto Rico (22)
- Spain (43)
- Uruguay (6)
- Venezuela (17)
