= Athletics at the 1990 Central American and Caribbean Games =

Athletics at the XVI CAC Games
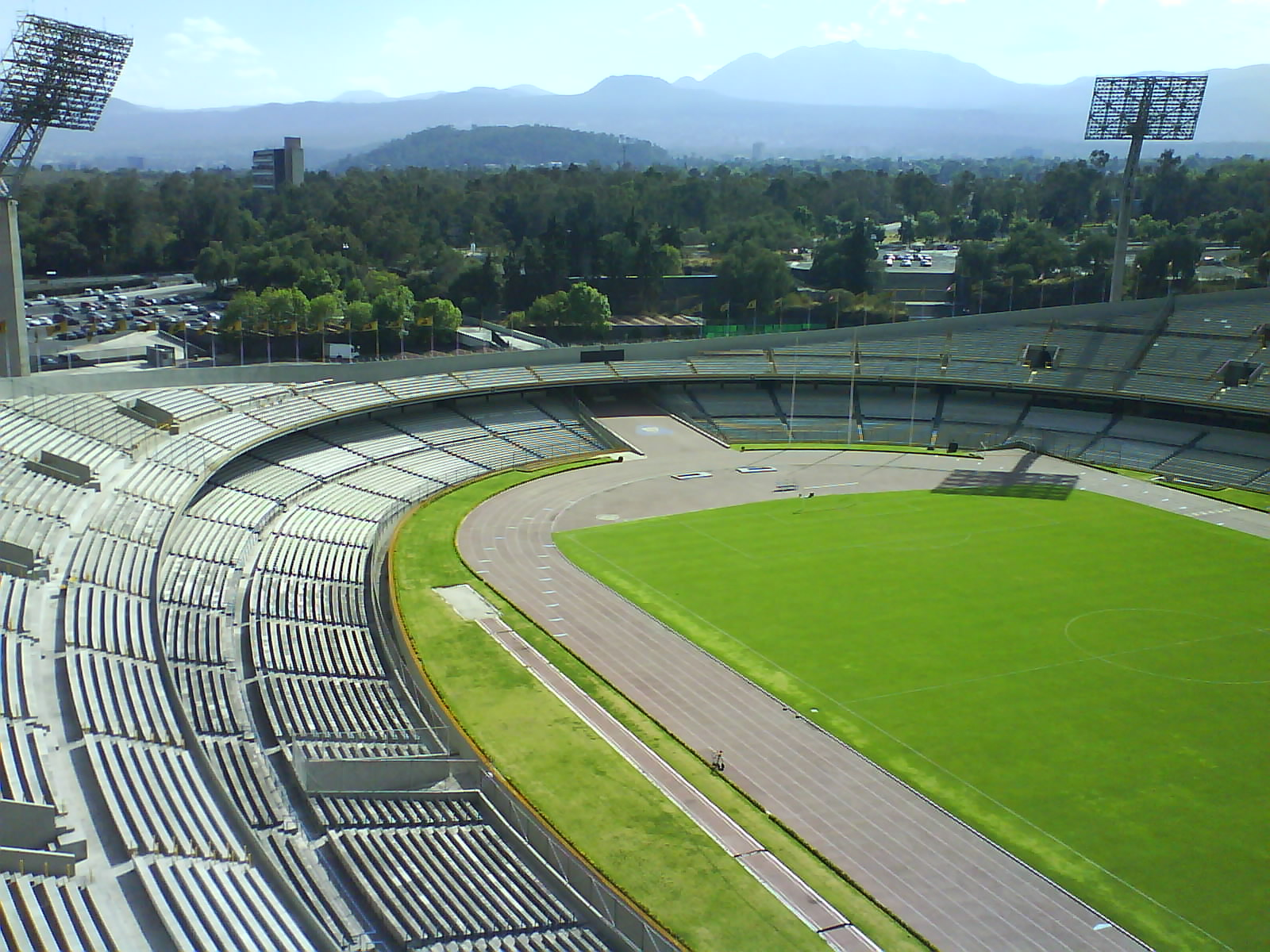
- Host stadium
- Dates: 28 November – 2 December
- Host city: Mexico City, Mexico
- Venue: Estadio Olímpico Universitario
- Events: 43
- Participation: 294 athletes from 28 nations
- Records set: 13 GR

The track and field competition at the 1990 Central American and Caribbean Games was held at the Estadio Olímpico Universitario in Mexico City, Mexico, between 28 November and 2 December.

== Medal summary ==
=== Men's events ===
Event	Gold		Silver		Bronze	
100 metres (wind: +5.3 m/s)	Joel Isasi; Cuba	10.17Aw	Jorge Aguilera; Cuba	10.29Aw	Wayne Watson; Jamaica	10.45Aw
200 metres (wind: -0.3 m/s)	Roberto Hernández; Cuba	20.72A	Edgardo Guilbe; Puerto Rico	20.79A	Junior Cornette; Guyana	21.22A
400 metres	Roberto Hernández; Cuba	44.84A	Alvin Daniel; Trinidad and Tobago	45.58A	Howard Burnett; Jamaica	45.86A
800 metres	Luis Toledo; Mexico	1:49.61A	Dale Jones; Antigua and Barbuda	1:51.18A	Armando Rodríguez; Mexico	1:51.35A
1500 metres	Arturo Barrios; Mexico	3:45.73A	Mauricio Hernández; Mexico	3:45.84A	José López; Venezuela	3:50.08A
5000 metres	Arturo Barrios; Mexico	13:49.89A GR	Marcos Barreto; Mexico	14:04.21A	Herder Vásquez; Colombia	14:18.48A
10,000 metres	Dionicio Cerón; Mexico	29:46.09A	Isaac García; Mexico	30:05.63A	Herder Vásquez; Colombia	30:28.89A
Marathon	Jorge González; Puerto Rico	2:18:55A GR	César Mercado; Puerto Rico	2:19:40A	Oscar Mejías; Venezuela	2:21:40A
110 metres hurdles (wind: +1.7 m/s)	Emilio Valle; Cuba	13.64A	Alexis Sánchez; Cuba	13.94A	Elvis Cedeño; Venezuela	14.18A
400 metres hurdles	Domingo Cordero; Puerto Rico	49.61A GR	Antonio Smith; Venezuela	51.32A	Llimy Rivas; Colombia	52.87A
3000 metre steeplechase	Germán Silva; Mexico	9:01.26A	Adalberto Vélez; Mexico	9:01.60A	Ángel Rodríguez; Cuba	9:14.60A
4 × 100 metres relay	Cuba; Andrés Simón; Leandro Peñalver; Félix Stevens; Joel Isasi	39.09A	Puerto Rico; Félix Molina; Domingo Cordero; Edgardo Guilbe; Elmer Williams	39.81A	Venezuela; Elvis Cedeño; Eliexer Pulgar; Henry Aguiar; Edgar Chourio	40.65A
4 × 400 metres relay	Jamaica; Terrence McCrae; Evon Clarke; Howard Burnett; Devon Morris	3:05.22A	Barbados; Terry Harewood; Stephen Roberts; Ronald Thorne; Seibert Straughan	3:05.48A	Cuba; Leandro Peñalver; Emilio Valle; Héctor Herrera; Lázaro Martínez	3:06.17A
20 kilometre road walk	Ernesto Canto; Mexico	1:23:52A GR	Carlos Mercenario; Mexico	1:24:03A	Héctor Moreno; Colombia	1:24:54A
50 kilometre road walk	Héctor Moreno; Colombia	4:06:04A	Edel Oliva; Cuba	4:10:19A	Orlando Díaz; Colombia	4:15:45A
High jump	Javier Sotomayor; Cuba	2.34A GR	Marino Drake; Cuba	2.32A	Carlos Arzuaga; Puerto Rico	2.17A
Pole vault	Ángel García; Cuba	5.40A GR	Miguel Berrío; Cuba	5.26A	Konstantín Zagustín; Venezuela	5.10A
Long jump	Juan Felipe Ortíz; Cuba	8.17A	Jaime Jefferson; Cuba	8.06A	Darío Ruíz; Mexico	7.95A
Triple jump	Lázaro Betancourt; Cuba	16.66A	Juan Miguel López; Cuba	16.50A	Sergio Saavedra; Venezuela	16.18A
Shot put	Paul Ruiz; Cuba	18.93A	Marciso Boué; Cuba	18.26A	Samuel Crespo; Puerto Rico	16.60A
Discus throw	Roberto Moya; Cuba	64.64A	Gabriel Pedroso; Cuba	59.44A	James Dedier; Trinidad and Tobago	53.40A
Hammer throw	Eladio Hernández; Cuba	70.74A GR	Guillermo Guzmán; Mexico	68.18A	René Díaz; Cuba	66.62A
Javelin throw	Ramón González; Cuba	78.86A GR	Juan de la Garza; Mexico	76.60A	Kirt Thompson; Trinidad and Tobago	75.38A
Decathlon	Miguel Valle; Cuba	7448A	Ernesto Betancourt; Cuba	7278A	Antonio Greene; Bahamas	7118A

=== Women's events ===
Event	Gold		Silver		Bronze	
100 metres (wind: +3.2 m/s)	Liliana Allen; Cuba	11.33Aw	Heather Samuel; Antigua and Barbuda	11.73Aw	Alejandra Quiñónes; Colombia	11.86Aw
200 metres (wind: -1.2 m/s)	Liliana Allen; Cuba	23.27A	Norfalia Carabalí; Colombia	23.75A	Heather Samuel; Antigua and Barbuda	24.33A
400 metres	Ana Fidelia Quirot; Cuba	51.70A	Norfalia Carabalí; Colombia	52.57A	Nancy McLeón; Cuba	55.29A
800 metres	Ana Fidelia Quirot; Cuba	2:04.85A	Letitia Vriesde; Suriname	2:04.97A	Jennifer Fisher; Bermuda	2:09.52A
1500 metres	Letitia Vriesde; Suriname	4:26.28A	María Luisa Servín; Mexico	4:29.03A	Jennifer Fisher; Bermuda	4:57.25A
3000 metres	María del Carmen Díaz; Mexico	9:30.09A GR	María Luisa Servín; Mexico	9:38.08A	Vilma Peña; Costa Rica	10:37.00A
10,000 metres	María del Carmen Díaz; Mexico	35:27.68A GR	Santa Velázquez; Mexico	35:53.36A	Vilma Peña; Costa Rica	37:32.53A
Marathon	Floría Moreno; Mexico	2:47:38A GR	Marisol Vargas; Mexico	2:50:25A	Maribel Durruty; Cuba	2:50:41A
100 metres hurdles (wind: +1.0 m/s)	Aliuska López; Cuba	12.94A	Odalys Adams; Cuba	13.26A	Sandra Taváres; Mexico	13.68A
400 metres hurdles	Elsa Jiménez; Cuba	57.59A	Maribelsy Peña; Colombia	59.06A	Tania Fernández; Cuba	59.55A
4 × 100 metres relay	Cuba; Odalys Adams; Aliuska López; Julia Duporty; Liliana Allen	44.54A	Colombia; Alejandra Quiñónes; Norfalia Carabalí; Ximena Restrepo; Maribelcy Peña	45.29A	Mexico; Sandra Taváres; Alma Vázquez; Guadalupe García; Gabriela Romero	45.75A
4 × 400 metres relay	Cuba; Nancy McLeon; Elsa Jiménez; Julia Duporty; Ana Fidelia Quirot	3:36.27A	Mexico; Erendira Villagómez; Alejandra Quintanar; Rosa García; Areli Ovalle	3:44.59A	Puerto Rico; Arealis Acosta; Daisy Ocasio; Sonia Escalera; Walesica Ramos	3:50.08A
10,000 metre track walk	Graciela Mendoza; Mexico	49:09.45A GR	Maricela Chávez; Mexico	50:49.55A	Liliana Bermeo; Colombia	51:33.27A
High jump	María del Carmen García; Cuba	1.87A	Silvia Costa; Cuba	1.82A	Cristina Fink; Mexico	1.79A
Long jump	Niurka Montalvo; Cuba	6.58A	Eloína Echevarría; Cuba	6.40Aw	Euphemia Huggins; Trinidad and Tobago	6.39A
Shot put	Belsis Laza; Cuba	17.73A	Herminia Fernández; Cuba	16.36A	María Isabel Urrutia; Colombia	16.09A
Discus throw	Bárbara Hechevarría; Cuba	58.62A	Olga Gómez; Cuba	56.06A	María Isabel Urrutia; Colombia	53.84A
Javelin throw	Herminia Bouza; Cuba	57.74A	María Caridad Colón; Cuba	55.86A	Marieta Riera; Venezuela	51.86A
Heptathlon	Zorobabelia Córdoba; Colombia	5647A GR	Magalys García; Cuba	5528A	Laiza Carrillo; Cuba	5519A

== Medal table ==
Rank	Nation	Gold	Silver	Bronze	Total
1	Cuba	27	17	7	51
2	Mexico	10	13	5	28
3	Colombia	2	4	9	15
4	Puerto Rico (PUR)	2	3	3	8
5	Suriname	1	1	0	2
6	Jamaica	1	0	2	3
7	Netherlands Antilles	0	2	1	3
8	Venezuela (VEN)	0	1	7	8
9	Trinidad and Tobago	0	1	3	4
10	Barbados	0	1	0	1
11	Bermuda	0	0	2	2
11	Costa Rica	0	0	2	2
13	Bahamas	0	0	1	1
13	Guyana	0	0	1	1
Totals (14 entries)		43	43	43	129

== Participation ==
- Antigua and Barbuda (3)
- Aruba (1)
- Bahamas (7)
- Barbados (2)
- Belize (2)
- Bermuda (2)
- British Virgin Islands (1)
- Cayman Islands (2)
- Colombia (20)
- Costa Rica (2)
- Cuba (60)
- Dominican Republic (3)
- Grenada (7)
- Guatemala (11)
- Guyana (2)
- Haiti (5)
- Jamaica (21)
- Mexico (30)
- Netherlands Antilles (4)
- Nicaragua (4)
- Panama (2)
- Puerto Rico (44)
- Saint Kitts and Nevis (9)
- Saint Lucia (4)
- Saint Vincent and the Grenadines (1)
- El Salvador (4)
- Suriname (2)
- Trinidad and Tobago (11)
- United States Virgin Islands (14)
- Venezuela (7)

== See also ==
- 1990 in athletics (track and field)
