= Lyndon Campos =

Brazilian hurdle athlete

Personal information
- Full name: Lyndon Johnson Pereira Campos
- Nationality: Brazilian
- Born: 8 May 1966 (age 59)
- Height: 1.83 m (6 ft 0 in)
- Weight: 73 kg (161 lb)

Sport
- Sport: Athletics
- Event: 110 metres hurdles

Lyndon Johnson Pereira Campos (born 8 May 1966) is a retired Brazilian athlete who specialised in the 110 metres hurdles. He represented his country at the 1987 World Championships without advancing from the first round.

His personal best in the event is 13.84 set in São Paulo in 1987.

== International competitions ==
Year	Competition	Venue	Position	Event	Notes
Representing Brazil
1983	South American Junior Championships	Medellín, Colombia	2nd	110 m hurdles	15.57
1984	Pan American Junior Championships	Nassau, Bahamas	3rd	110 m hurdles	14.50 (w)
1984	Pan American Junior Championships	Nassau, Bahamas	4th	4 × 400 m relay	3:18.59
1984	Pan American Junior Championships	Nassau, Bahamas	5th	4 × 100 m relay	42.93
1984	South American Junior Championships	Caracas, Venezuela	1st	110 m hurdles	14.39
1985	South American Junior Championships	Santa Fe, Argentina	2nd	110 m hurdles	14.84
1986	Ibero-American Championships	Havana, Cuba	2nd	110 m hurdles	13.99
1987	World Championships	Rome, Italy	22nd (h)	110 m hurdles	13.91
1987	South American Championships	São Paulo, Brazil	1st	110 m hurdles	14.13
1988	Ibero-American Championships	Mexico City, Mexico	4th	110 m hurdles	13.91
1988	Ibero-American Championships	Mexico City, Mexico	3rd (h)	4 × 100 m relay	39.21^{1}
1990	Ibero-American Championships	Manaus, Brazil	3rd	110 m hurdles	14.61

^{1}Disqualified in the final
