= Athletics at the 1987 Pan American Games – Women's 4 × 100 metres relay =

Women's 4 × 100 metres relay at the Pan American Games

The women's 4 × 100 metres relay event at the 1987 Pan American Games was held in Indianapolis, United States on 16 August.

== Results ==
Rank	Nation	Athletes	Time	Notes
1st place, gold medalist(s)	United States	Sheila Echols, Gwen Torrence, Michelle Finn-Burrell, Gail Devers	42.91	
2nd place, silver medalist(s)	Cuba	Eusebia Riquelme, Aliuska López, Susana Armenteros, Liliana Allen	44.16	
3rd place, bronze medalist(s)	Brazil	Inês Ribeiro, Cleide Amaral, Claudilea dos Santos, Sheila de Oliveira	45.37	
4	Colombia	Olga Escalante, Norfalia Carabalí, Elia Mera, Amparo Caicedo	45.94	
5	Mexico	Sandra Taváres, Alma Delia Vázquez, Alejandra Flores, Rosa García	46.29	
6	United States Virgin Islands	Terry Daley, Clare Wade, Cislyn Blake, Ruth Morris	48.08	
	Jamaica		DNS	
