= Mercedes Alvarez =

Mercedes Alvarez may refer to:

- Mercedes Álvarez (born 1956), Cuban athlete
- Mercedes Álvarez (director)
- Mercedes Alvarez (volleyball) (born 1996), Cuban volleyball player
- Mercedes Alvarez (politician) (born 1982), Filipino politician
