= Maria Fernandes (Brazilian athlete) =

Brazilian athlete

Personal information
- Full name: Maria Nilba Reis Fernandes
- Born: 25 September 1960 (age 65)

Sport
- Sport: Athletics
- Event: Shot put
- Club: CCEC

Maria Nilba Reis Fernandes (born 25 September 1960) is a retired Brazilian athlete who competed primarily in the shot put. She won multiple medals at continental level.

== International competitions ==
Year	Competition	Venue	Position	Event	Notes
Representing Brazil
1978	South American Junior Championships	São Paulo, Brazil	3rd	Shot put	12.05 m
1981	South American Championships	La Paz, Bolivia	2nd	Shot put	13.18 m
1983	South American Championships	Santa Fe, Argentina	1st	Shot put	15.01 m
1983	South American Championships	Santa Fe, Argentina	3rd	Discus throw	44.72 m
1985	South American Championships	Santiago, Chile	1st	Shot put	14.89 m
1986	Ibero-American Championships	Mexico City, Mexico	3rd	Shot put	15.21 m
1987	South American Championships	São Paulo, Brazil	1st	Shot put	14.49 m
1988	Ibero-American Championships	Mexico City, Mexico	7th	Shot put	14.02 m
1990	Ibero-American Championships	Manaus, Brazil	4th	Shot put	15.22 m

== Personal bests ==
- Shot put – 16.32 (Manaus 1983)
- Discus throw – 48.44
