= María del Carmen García =

Cuban high jumper (born 1969)

Personal information
- Born: 27 July 1969 (age 56)

Sport
- Sport: Track and field
Medal record
Representing Cuba
Pan American Games
Silver medal – second place	1991 Havana	High jump
Central American and Caribbean Games
Gold medal – first place	1990 Mexico City	High jump
CAC Junior Championships (U20)
Gold medal – first place	1986 Mexico City	High jump

María del Carmen García (born 27 July 1969) is a retired high jumper from Cuba, who set her personal best on 17 March 1990, jumping 1.92 metres at a meet in Manaus.

== Achievements ==
Year	Competition	Venue	Position	Event	Notes
Representing Cuba
1985	Central American and Caribbean Championships	Guatemala City, Guatemala	1st	High jump	1.80 m
1986	Central American and Caribbean; Junior Championships (U-20)	Mexico City, México	1st	High jump	1.80 m A
1986	Ibero-American Championships	La Habana, Cuba	4th	High jump	1.65 m
1987	Central American and Caribbean Games	Caracas, Venezuela	2nd	High jump	1.81 m
1988	World Junior Championships	Sudbury, Canada	11th	High jump	1.81 m
1990	Central American and Caribbean Games	Mexico City, Mexico	1st	High jump	1.86 m
1991	Pan American Games	Havana, Cuba	2nd	High jump	1.85 m
