= Sandra Taváres =

Mexican hurdler

Personal information
- Full name: Sandra Taváres Batista
- Nationality: Mexican
- Born: 2 September 1962 (age 63)
- Height: 1.73 m (5 ft 8 in)
- Weight: 55 kg (121 lb)

Sport
- Sport: Track and field
- Event: 100 metres hurdles

Sandra Taváres Batista (born 2 September 1962) is a Mexican hurdler. She competed in the women's 100 metres hurdles at the 1988 Summer Olympics.

== International competitions ==
Year	Competition	Venue	Position	Event	Notes
Representing Mexico
1980	Central American and Caribbean; Junior Championships (U20)	Nassau, Bahamas	3rd	100 m hurdles	15.4
1982	Central American and Caribbean Games	Havana, Cuba	8th	400 m hurdles	63.24
1982	Central American and Caribbean Games	Havana, Cuba	7th	4 × 400 m relay	3:58.91
1985	World Indoor Games	Paris, France	13th (h)	100 m hurdles	8.86
1985	Central American and Caribbean Championships	Nassau, Bahamas	2nd	100 m hurdles	13.78 (w)
1985	Central American and Caribbean Championships	Nassau, Bahamas	2nd	4 × 100 m relay	46.04
1986	Central American and Caribbean Games	Santiago, Dominican Republic	3rd	100 m hurdles	13.86
1986	Central American and Caribbean Games	Santiago, Dominican Republic	3rd	4 × 100 m relay	45.58
1986	Ibero-American Championships	Havana, Cuba	3rd	100 m hurdles	14.03
1986	Ibero-American Championships	Havana, Cuba	1st	4 × 100 m relay	45.95
1987	Central American and Caribbean Championships	Caracas, Venezuela	1st	100 m hurdles	13.49
1987	Central American and Caribbean Championships	Caracas, Venezuela	2nd	4 × 100 m relay	46.25
1987	Pan American Games	Indianapolis, United States	6th (h)	100 m hurdles	13.63^{1}
1987	Pan American Games	Indianapolis, United States	5th	4 × 100 m relay	46.29
1987	World Championships	Rome, Italy	23rd (h)	100 m hurdles	13.86
1988	Ibero-American Championships	Mexico City, Mexico	2nd	100 m hurdles	13.53
1988	Olympic Games	Seoul, South Korea	26th (h)	100 m hurdles	13.81
1990	Central American and Caribbean Games	Mexico City, Mexico	3rd	100 m hurdles	13.68
1990	Central American and Caribbean Games	Mexico City, Mexico	3rd	4 × 100 m relay	45.75

^{1}Did not finish in the final
