= Dulce García =

Cuban javelin thrower (1968–2019)

Personal information
- Born: Dulce Margarita García Gil; 2 July 1968 Puerto Padre, Cuba
- Died: 9 September 2019 (aged 51) Chile
Medal record
Representing Cuba
Pan American Games
Gold medal – first place	1991 Havana	Javelin throw

Dulce Margarita García Gil (2 July 1968 – 9 September 2019) was a Cuban javelin thrower, who represented her native country at the 1992 Summer Olympics. She set her personal best (67.90 metres) in 1986.

== Achievements ==
Year	Competition	Venue	Position	Notes
Representing Cuba
1986	Ibero-American Championships	Havana, Cuba	2nd	59.60 m
1988	Ibero-American Championships	Mexico City, Mexico	2nd	61.83 m A
1989	Central American and Caribbean Championships	San Juan, Puerto Rico	2nd	61.18 m
1991	Pan American Games	Havana, Cuba	1st	64.78 m
1991	World Championships	Tokyo, Japan	7th	62.68 m
1992	Ibero-American Championships	Seville, Spain	1st	57.38 m
1992	Olympic Games	Barcelona, Spain	8th	58.26 m
