= Montserrat Pujol (Spanish athlete) =

Spanish athletics competitor

Personal information
- Born: 27 April 1961 (age 65) Sabadell, Spain
- Height: 1.72 m (5 ft 8 in)
- Weight: 58 kg (128 lb)

Sport
- Sport: Athletics
- Events: 800 m, 1500 m, 400 m hurdles
- Club: Santiveri

Montserrat Pujol Clusella (born 27 April 1961 in Sabadell) is a retired Spanish hurdler and middle-distance runner. She represented her country at the 1988 Summer Olympics as well as one outdoor and one indoor World Championships.

== International competitions ==
Year	Competition	Venue	Position	Event	Notes
Representing Spain
1977	European Junior Championships	Donetsk, Soviet Union	5th (sf)	400 m	54.62
1978	European Championships	Prague, Czech Republic	24th (h)	400 m hurdles	60.21
1979	European Junior Championships	Bydgoszcz, Poland	12th (sf)	400 m	55.91
1981	European Indoor Championships	Grenoble, France	6th	800 m	2:06.13
1982	European Championships	Athens, Greece	13th (h)	400 m hurdles	58.06
1986	European Championships	Stuttgart, West Germany	19th (h)	400 m hurdles	58.14
1986	European Championships	Stuttgart, West Germany	6th	4 × 400 m relay	3:32.51
1986	Ibero-American Championships	Havana, Cuba	2nd	4 × 400 m relay	3:36.82
1987	European Indoor Championships	Liévin, France	5th	800 m	2:02.31
1987	World Indoor Championships	Indianapolis, United States	10th (h)	800 m	2:04.88
1987	World Championships	Rome, Italy	15th (h)	4 × 400 m relay	3:32.01
1987	Mediterranean Games	Latakia, Syria	–	400 m hurdles	DNF
1988	European Indoor Championships	Budapest, Hungary	7th (sf)	800 m	2:04.49
1988	Ibero-American Championships	Mexico City, Mexico	4th	800 m	2:04.19
1988	Ibero-American Championships	Mexico City, Mexico	2nd	4 × 400 m relay	3:32.54
1988	Olympic Games	Seoul, South Korea	21st (h)	800 m	2:03.73
1989	World Cup	Barcelona, Spain	4th	1500 m	4:21.17
1990	European Indoor Championships	Glasgow, United Kingdom	8th	1500 m	4:33.87
1990	European Championships	Split, Yugoslavia	14th (h)	1500 m	4:15.72

== Personal bests ==
Outdoor

- 400 metres – 53.59 (Sittard 1978)
- 800 metres – 2:00.56 (Seville 1989)
- 1000 metres – 2:34.96 (Jerez 1989)
- 1500 metres – 4:07.7 (Oslo 1990)
- One mile – 4:25.17 (Zürich 1989)
- 400 metres hurdles – 57.29 (Barcelona 1982)

Indoor

- 800 metres – 2:02.31 (Liévin 1987)
- 1000 metres – 2:44.61 (Madrid 1990)
- 1500 metres – 4:09.48 (San Sebastián 1990)
