= Herminia Bouza =

Cuban javelin thrower (born 1965)

Personal information
- Born: September 25, 1965 (age 60)

Sport
- Sport: Track and field
Medal record
Representing Cuba
Pan American Games
Bronze medal – third place	1991 Havana	Javelin throw
Central American and Caribbean Games
Gold medal – first place	1990 Mexico City	Javelin throw

Herminia Bouza (born September 25, 1965) is a retired javelin thrower from Cuba. She set her personal best (64.64 metres) on July 1, 1988, in Maturín, Venezuela.

== Achievements ==
Year	Competition	Venue	Position	Notes
Representing Cuba
1987	Central American and Caribbean Championships	Caracas, Venezuela	1st	62.78 m
1988	Ibero-American Championships	Mexico City, Mexico	1st	62.48 m A
1989	Central American and Caribbean Championships	San Juan, Puerto Rico	3rd	57.82 m
1990	Central American and Caribbean Games	Mexico City, Mexico	1st	57.74 m
1991	Pan American Games	Havana, Cuba	3rd	56.70 m
