= Tania Fernández =

Cuban athlete

Personal information
- Full name: Tania Fernández Hodelín
- Nationality: Cuban
- Born: 26 August 1967 (age 58)

Sport
- Sport: Athletics
- Event: 400 metres hurdles

Tania Fernández Hodelín (born 26 August 1967) is a retired Cuban athlete who specialised in the 400 metres hurdles. she represented her country at the 1987 World Championships in Rome without advancing from the first round.

Her personal best in the event is 56.33 seconds set in Indianapolis in 1987.

Her son Luis Enrique Zayas is a high jumper.

== International competitions ==
Year	Competition	Venue	Position	Event	Notes
Representing Cuba
1986	Central American and Caribbean Games	Santiago, Dominican Republic	2nd	400 m hurdles	57.60
1986	Ibero-American Championships	Havana, Cuba	3rd	400 m hurdles	59.15
1987	Pan American Games	Indianapolis, United States	4th	400 m hurdles	56.33
1987	Pan American Games	Indianapolis, United States	4th	4 × 400 m relay	3:29.70
1987	World Championships	Rome, Italy	28th (h)	400 m hurdles	58.78
1987	World Championships	Rome, Italy	9th (h)	4 × 400 m relay	3:29.78
1988	Ibero-American Championships	Mexico City, Mexico	1st	400 m hurdles	56.73
1990	Central American and Caribbean Games	Mexico City, Mexico	3rd	400 m hurdles	59.55
