= Soraya Telles =

Brazilian middle-distance runner

Personal information
- Born: September 6, 1958 (age 67) Barbacena, Minas Gerais, Brazil

Sport
- Sport: Track and field
Medal record
Representing Brazil
Pan American Games
Bronze medal – third place	1987 Indianapolis	800m

Soraya Vieira Telles-Teixeira (born September 6, 1958) is a former middle distance runner from Brazil, who represented her native country at the 1988 Summer Olympics in Seoul, South Korea.

She notably won a bronze medal in 800 metres at the 1987 Pan American Games, behind Ana Fidelia Quirot and Delisa Floyd.

She was one of the torchbearers in Brazil ahead the Rio 2016 Olympics.

== International competitions ==
Year	Competition	Venue	Position	Event	Notes
Representing Brazil
1976	South American Junior Championships	Maracaibo, Venezuela	3rd	400 m	57.19
1976	South American Junior Championships	Maracaibo, Venezuela	1st	4 × 400 m relay	3:52.24
1979	Pan American Games	San Juan, Puerto Rico	8th	800 m	2:07.3
1979	Pan American Games	San Juan, Puerto Rico	7th	1500 m	4:30.2
1979	South American Championships	Bucaramanga, Colombia	7th	1500 m	4:50.5
1983	South American Championships	Santa Fe, Argentina	2nd	800 m	2:06.2
1983	South American Championships	Santa Fe, Argentina	5th	1500 m	4:29.3
1985	South American Championships	Santiago, Chile	2nd	800 m	2:06.30
1985	South American Championships	Santiago, Chile	5th	1500 m	4:25.87
1985	South American Championships	Santiago, Chile	1st	4 × 400 m relay	3:39.77
1986	Ibero-American Championships	Havana, Cuba	2nd	800 m	2:01.55
1987	World Indoor Championships	Indianapolis, United States	11th (h)	800 m	2:05.09
1987	Pan American Games	Indianapolis, United States	3rd	800 m	2:00.56
1987	Pan American Games	Indianapolis, United States	4th	1500 m	4:14.64
1987	World Championships	Rome, Italy	20th (h)	800 m	2:03.55
1987	World Championships	Rome, Italy	11th (h)	4 × 400 m relay	3:30.91
1987	South American Championships	São Paulo, Brazil	1st	800 m	2:07.7
1987	South American Championships	São Paulo, Brazil	1st	1500 m	4:29.9
1987	South American Championships	São Paulo, Brazil	1st	4 × 400 m relay	3:38.13
1988	Ibero-American Championships	Mexico City, Mexico	2nd	800 m	2:02.00
1988	Ibero-American Championships	Mexico City, Mexico	1st	1500 m	4:28.91
1988	Ibero-American Championships	Mexico City, Mexico	1st	4 × 400 m relay	3:29:21
1988	Olympic Games	Seoul, South Korea	13th (sf)	800 m	2:01.86
1988	Olympic Games	Seoul, South Korea	11th (h)	4 × 400 m relay	3:36.81
1990	Ibero-American Championships	Manaus, Brazil	1st	4 × 400 m relay	3:32.8
1991	Pan American Games	Havana, Cuba	4th	1500 m	4:22.21
1992	Ibero-American Championships	Seville, Spain	1st	1500 m	4:18.03
1993	South American Championships	Lima, Peru	1st	1500 m	4:23.1
1993	South American Championships	Lima, Peru	1st	4 × 400 m relay	3:36.49
1993	World Championships	Stuttgart, Germany	28th (h)	1500 m	4:18.67
