= Athletics at the 1991 Pan American Games – Women's javelin throw =

Women's javelin throw at the Pan American Games

The women's javelin throw event at the 1991 Pan American Games was held in Havana, Cuba on 11 August.

== Results ==
Rank	Name	Nationality	#1	#2	#3	#4	#5	#6	Result	Notes
1st place, gold medalist(s)	Dulce García	Cuba	60.38	64.78	62.68	57.00	x	56.86	64.78	
2nd place, silver medalist(s)	Donna Mayhew	United States	58.44	x	x	x	x	x	58.44	
3rd place, bronze medalist(s)	Herminia Bouza	Cuba	53.00	56.70	x	x	x	x	56.70	
4	Laverne Eve	Bahamas	56.38	53.14	x	53.44	x	52.56	56.38	
5	Marilyn Senz	United States	53.24	x	52.02	51.46	53.16	52.30	53.24	
6	Cheryl Coker	Canada	48.00	49.20	48.92	x	53.08	x	53.08	
7	Sueli dos Santos	Brazil	x	x	45.48	50.66	x	x	50.66	
8	Marieta Riera	Venezuela	50.04	47.68	47.76	46.50	47.20	48.96	50.04	
9	Terry-Lynn Paynter	Bermuda	44.50	44.58	45.02				45.02	
