= Athletics at the 1987 Pan American Games – Women's 400 metres hurdles =

Women's 400 metres hurdles at the Pan American Games

The women's 400 metres hurdles event at the 1987 Pan American Games was held in Indianapolis, United States on 10 and 12 August.

== Medalists ==
Gold	Silver	Bronze
Judi Brown-King; United States	Sandra Farmer; Jamaica	LaTanya Sheffield; United States

== Results ==
=== Heats ===
Rank	Heat	Name	Nationality	Time	Notes
1	1	Judi Brown-King	United States	56.32	Q
2	2	Sandra Farmer	Jamaica	57.01	Q
3	1	Tania Fernández	Cuba	57.08	Q
4	2	Odalys Hernández	Cuba	57.56	Q
5	2	LaTanya Sheffield	United States	57.66	Q
6	1	Liliana Chalá	Ecuador	57.67	Q
7	1	Gwen Wall	Canada	58.96	q
8	2	Dana Wright	Canada	59.40	q
9	1	Maria Bortolocci	Brazil	59.66	
10	2	Christa Schumann	Guatemala	1:02.97	
11	2	Ingrid Rosero	Ecuador	1:03.38	

=== Final ===
Rank	Lane	Name	Nationality	Time	Notes
1st place, gold medalist(s)	5	Judi Brown-King	United States	54.23	GR, NR
2nd place, silver medalist(s)	6	Sandra Farmer	Jamaica	54.59	NR
3rd place, bronze medalist(s)	4	LaTanya Sheffield	United States	56.15	
4	3	Tania Fernández	Cuba	56.33	
5	7	Liliana Chalá	Ecuador	57.13	NR
6	1	Odalys Hernández	Cuba	57.41	
7	8	Dana Wright	Canada	57.50	
8	2	Gwen Wall	Canada	58.82	
