= Francisco Soria =

Cuban hammer thrower

Francisco Soria (born 30 July 1963) is a retired Cuban hammer thrower.

He won the gold medal at the 1982 Central American and Caribbean Junior Championships, the gold medal at the 1982 Pan American Junior Athletics Championships, the silver medal at the 1987 Central American and Caribbean Championships, finished seventh at the 1985 World Cup and won the silver medal at the 1986 Ibero-American Championships. He became Cuban champion in 1987.
