= Miguel Elizondo =

Mexican sprinter (born 1968)

Personal information
- Nationality: Mexican
- Born: 10 July 1968 (age 58) Monterrey, Mexico

Sport
- Sport: Sprinting
- Event: 4 × 100 metres relay

Miguel Elizondo Navarrete (born 10 July 1968) is a Mexican sprinter. He competed in the men's 4 × 100 metres relay at the 1988 Summer Olympics. He also competed in the two-man bobsleigh at the 1992 Winter Olympics.

== See also ==
- List of athletes who competed in both the Summer and Winter Olympic games
