= Carlos Casar =

Mexican bobsledder (born 1960)

Personal information
- Nationality: Mexican
- Born: 8 August 1960 (age 65)

Sport
- Sport: Bobsleigh

Carlos Casar (born 8 August 1960) is a Mexican bobsledder. He competed in the two man and the four man events at the 1992 Winter Olympics.
