= Marcelino Colín =

Mexican racewalker

Personal information
- Nationality: Mexican
- Born: 2 June 1961 (age 65)

Sport
- Sport: Athletics
- Event: Racewalking

Marcelino Colín (born 2 June 1961) is a Mexican racewalker. He competed in the men's 20 kilometres walk at the 1984 Summer Olympics.
