= Susana Armenteros =

Cuban sprinter (born 1961)

Personal information
- Born: 11 August 1961 (age 64) Cienfuegos Province, Cuba

Sport
- Sport: Track and field
Medal record
Representing Cuba
Pan American Games
Silver medal – second place	1987 Indianapolis	4x400m relay
Central American and Caribbean Games
Gold medal – first place	1986 Santiago	4x100m relay

Susana Estela Armenteros Gutiérrez (born 11 August 1961) is a retired Cuban sprinter who specialized in the 100 and 200 metres.

She won the silver medal at the 1983 Central American and Caribbean Championships (100 m), the silver medal at the 1986 Ibero-American Championships (200 m), finished seventh at the 1987 Pan American Games (200 m) and finished fifth at the 1988 Ibero-American Championships (both 100 and 200 m) Armenteros also became Cuban champion.

In the 4 × 100 metres relay she won a gold medal at the 1986 Central American and Caribbean Games, a bronze medal at the 1986 Ibero-American Championships, a silver medal at the 1987 Pan American Games and finished seventh at the 1987 World Championships.
