= Odalys Hernández =

Cuban hurdler (born 1966)

Odalys Hernández Benet (born 4 September 1966) is a retired Cuban hurdler.

She won the silver medal at the 1985 Central American and Caribbean Championships (as well as the bronze medal in 100 m hurdles), the silver medal at the 1986 Ibero-American Championships, finished sixth at the 1987 Pan American Games, fifth at the 1988 Ibero-American Championships, won the gold medal at the 1994 Ibero-American Championships, the silver medal at the 1995 Central American and Caribbean Championships and the silver medal at the 1996 Ibero-American Championships. Hernández also became Cuban champion.

In the 4 × 400 metres relay she won a gold medal at the 1986 Central American and Caribbean Games, a gold medal at the 1986 Ibero-American Championships, a bronze medal at the 1988 Ibero-American Championships, and finished sixth at the 1994 Ibero-American Championships. She also competed at the 1987 World Championships without reaching the final.
