= Mercedes Álvarez =

Cuban sprinter (born 1956)

Mercedes Álvarez (born 18 December 1956) is a retired Cuban sprinter who specialized in the 400 metres.

She won the gold medal at the 1974 Central American and Caribbean Junior Championships, the silver medal at the 1981 Central American and Caribbean Championships, the silver medal at the 1982 Central American and Caribbean Games the silver medal at the 1983 Central American and Caribbean Championships, finished sixth at the 1983 Pan American Games. sixth at the 1986 Ibero-American Championships and seventh at the 1988 Ibero-American Championships. She also became Cuban champion.

In the 4 × 400 metres relay she won a gold medal at the 1982 Central American and Caribbean Games, a bronze medal at the 1983 Pan American Games a gold medal at the 1986 Ibero-American Championships, finished fourth at the 1987 Pan American Games and won a bronze medal at the 1988 Ibero-American Championships.
