= Luis Toledo =

Mexican middle-distance runner

Personal information
- Born: 3 December 1964 (age 61)

Sport
- Sport: Track and field
Medal record
Representing Mexico
Summer Universiade
Bronze medal – third place	1987 Zagreb	800m
Central American and Caribbean Games
Gold medal – first place	1990 Mexico City	800m

Luis Karim Toledo Cuesta (born 3 December 1964) is a Mexican middle-distance runner who competed in the 1992 Summer Olympics.
