= Cristina Pérez (athlete) =

Spanish sprinter

Personal information
- Nationality: Spanish
- Born: 30 October 1965 (age 60)

Sport
- Sport: Sprinting
- Event: 4 × 400 metres relay

Cristina Pérez (born 30 October 1965) is a Spanish sprinter.

Perez competed in the women's 4 × 400 metres relay at the 1992 Summer Olympics. Perez held the Spanish national record for 400 metres hurdles for 33 years, until her time of 55.23 was lowered by Sara Gallego, in 2021.
