= Andrés Simón =

Cuban sprinter (born 1961)

Personal information
- Full name: Andrés Simón Gómez
- Born: September 15, 1961 (age 64) Guantánamo, Cuba
Medal record
Men's athletics
Representing Cuba
Olympic Games
Bronze medal – third place	1992 Barcelona	4 × 100m relay
World Indoor Championships
Gold medal – first place	1989 Budapest	60 metres
Central American and Caribbean Games
Gold medal – first place	1986 Santiago	100 metres
Gold medal – first place	1986 Santiago	4x100m relay
Gold medal – first place	1990 Mexico City	4x100m relay
Gold medal – first place	1993 Ponce	4x100m relay
Silver medal – second place	1993 Ponce	100 metres
Pan American Games
Silver medal – second place	1987 Indianapolis	4x100m relay
Summer Universiade
Gold medal – first place	1985 Kobe	4x100m relay
Silver medal – second place	1985 Kobe	100 metres

Andrés Simón Gómez (born September 15, 1961) is a former sprinter from Cuba who won an Olympic bronze medal in 4 × 100 metres relay in 1992 Barcelona. He also participated in the relay at the 1996 Olympics in Atlanta. He specialized in the 60 meters and 100 metres events. His personal best for the 100 m is 10.06, set in Havana 1987. He won the gold medal in the 60 m competition at the 1989 IAAF World Indoor Championships in Budapest.
