= Mauricio Hernández (athlete) =

Mexican middle-distance runner

Personal information
- Nationality: Mexican
- Born: Mauricio Hernández Sánchez; 30 November 1961 (age 64)
- Height: 1.75 m (5 ft 9 in)
- Weight: 61 kg (134 lb)

Sport
- Sport: Middle-distance running
- Event: 800 metres

Mauricio Hernández Sánchez (born 30 November 1961) is a Mexican middle-distance runner. He competed in the men's 800 metres at the 1988 Summer Olympics.
