= 1990 Ibero-American Championships in Athletics – Results =

These are the results of the 1990 Ibero-American Championships in Athletics which took place from 14 to 16 September 1990 at Vila Olímpica in Manaus, Brazil.

== Men's results ==
=== 100 meters ===
Heat 1 – 16 September
Wind: +0.5 m/s

| Rank | Name | Nationality | Time | Notes |
|---|---|---|---|---|
| 1 | Robson da Silva | Brazil | 10.58 | Q |
| 2 | Florencio Gascón | Spain | 10.69 | Q |
| 3 | John Jairo Mena | Colombia | 10.77 | Q |
| 4 | Fernando Espinoza | Ecuador | 10.88 | q |
| 5 | Fernando Damasio | Portugal | 10.96 | |

Heat 2 – 16 September
Wind: +0.5 m/s

| Rank | Name | Nationality | Time | Notes |
|---|---|---|---|---|
| 1 | Fernando Botasso | Brazil | 10.43 | Q |
| 2 | Carlos Moreno | Chile | 10.53 | Q |
| 3 | Enrique Talavera | Spain | 10.56 | Q |
| | Antônio dos Santos Filho | Brazil | 10.60 | Guest |
| 4 | Pedro Curvelo | Portugal | 10.88 | q |
| 5 | Marco Mina | Peru | 11.33 | |

Final – 16 September
Wind: +1.2 m/s

| Rank | Name | Nationality | Time | Notes |
|---|---|---|---|---|
| 1st place, gold medalist(s) | Robson da Silva | Brazil | 10.12 | |
| 2nd place, silver medalist(s) | Fernando Botasso | Brazil | 10.34 | |
| 3rd place, bronze medalist(s) | Enrique Talavera | Spain | 10.45 | |
| 4 | Carlos Moreno | Chile | 10.47 | |
| 5 | Florencio Gascón | Spain | 10.56 | |
| 6 | John Jairo Mena | Colombia | 10.69 | |
| 7 | Pedro Curvelo | Portugal | 10.74 | |
| 8 | Fernando Espinoza | Ecuador | 10.76 | |

=== 200 meters ===
Heat 1 – 15 September
Wind: -1.1 m/s

| Rank | Name | Nationality | Time | Notes |
|---|---|---|---|---|
| 1 | Robson da Silva | Brazil | 20.81 | Q |
| 2 | Luis Cunha | Portugal | 21.69 | Q |
| 3 | Luis Turón | Spain | 21.72 | Q |
| 4 | Cristián Courbis | Chile | 21.83 | q |
| 5 | Dick Perlaza | Ecuador | 22.07 | q |
| 6 | Geraldo Maranhão Jr. | Brazil | 21.62 | |

Heat 2 – 15 September
Wind: -1.1 m/s

| Rank | Name | Nationality | Time | Notes |
|---|---|---|---|---|
| 1 | Marcelo Brivilati da Silva | Brazil | 21.49 | Q |
| 2 | Luis Barroso | Portugal | 21.81 | Q |
| 3 | Carlos Morales | Chile | 22.04 | Q |
| 4 | Fernando Espinoza | Ecuador | 22.13 | |
| 5 | Sergio López | Spain | 22.32 | |

Final – 15 September
Wind: +0.3 m/s

| Rank | Name | Nationality | Time | Notes |
|---|---|---|---|---|
| 1st place, gold medalist(s) | Robson Caetano da Silva | Brazil | 20.43 | |
| 2nd place, silver medalist(s) | Marcelo Brivilati da Silva | Brazil | 21.43 | |
| 3rd place, bronze medalist(s) | Luis Cunha | Portugal | 21.45 | |
| 4 | Luis Barroso | Portugal | 21.50 | |
| 5 | Luis Turón | Spain | 21.55 | |
| 6 | Cristián Courbis | Chile | 21.67 | |
| 7 | Dick Perlaza | Ecuador | 22.15 | |
| | Carlos Morales | Chile | DNS | |

=== 400 meters ===
Heat 1 – 14 September

| Rank | Name | Nationality | Time | Notes |
|---|---|---|---|---|
| 1 | Inaldo Sena | Brazil | 46.54 | |
| 2 | Roberto Bortolotto | Brazil | 47.33 | |
| 3 | Carlos Morales | Chile | 47.63 | |
| 4 | Manuel Moreno | Spain | 47.97 | |
| 5 | Miguel Cuesta | Spain | 48.49 | |

Heat 2 – 14 September

| Rank | Name | Nationality | Time | Notes |
|---|---|---|---|---|
| | Geraldo Maranhão Jr. | Brazil | 46.92 | Guest |
| 1 | Cristián Courbis | Chile | 47.07 | |
| 2 | Pedro Curvelo | Portugal | 47.81 | |
| 3 | Dick Perlaza | Ecuador | 47.94 | |
| 4 | Eduardo Mancheno | Ecuador | 48.43 | |

Final Standings – 14 September
There was no proper 400m final. Rather, the athletes were classified according to their times achieved in the heat.

| Rank | Name | Nationality | Time | Notes |
|---|---|---|---|---|
| 1st place, gold medalist(s) | Inaldo Sena | Brazil | 46.54 | |
| 2nd place, silver medalist(s) | Cristián Courbis | Chile | 47.07 | |
| 3rd place, bronze medalist(s) | Roberto Bortolotto | Brazil | 47.33 | |
| 4 | Carlos Morales | Chile | 47.63 | |
| 5 | Pedro Curvelo | Portugal | 47.81 | |
| 6 | Dick Perlaza | Ecuador | 47.94 | |
| 7 | Manuel Moreno | Spain | 47.97 | |
| 8 | Eduardo Mancheno | Ecuador | 48.43 | |

=== 800 meters ===
Final – 16 September

| Rank | Name | Nationality | Time | Notes |
|---|---|---|---|---|
| 1st place, gold medalist(s) | José Luíz Barbosa | Brazil | 1:46.18 | |
| 2nd place, silver medalist(s) | Luis Migueles | Argentina | 1:46.97 | |
| 3rd place, bronze medalist(s) | Luis Javier González | Spain | 1:47.66 | |
| 4 | Edgar de Oliveira | Brazil | 1:47.93 | |
| 5 | António Abrantes | Portugal | 1:48.30 | |
| 6 | Ángel Fariñas | Spain | 1:48.36 | |
| 7 | Luis Karim Toledo | Mexico | 1:48.39 | |
| 8 | Leonardo Malgor | Argentina | 1:51.04 | |
| 9 | Edgardo Graglia | Argentina | 1:51.36 | |

=== 1500 meters ===
Final – 15 September

| Rank | Name | Nationality | Time | Notes |
|---|---|---|---|---|
| 1st place, gold medalist(s) | Víctor Rojas | Spain | 3:42.86 | |
| 2nd place, silver medalist(s) | Ángel Fariñas | Spain | 3:42.93 | |
| 3rd place, bronze medalist(s) | José Mauro Valente | Brazil | 3:43.17 | |
| 4 | Pablo Squella | Chile | 3:43.43 | |
| 5 | Edgar de Oliveira | Brazil | 3:44.17 | |
| | João Carlos Leite | Brazil | 3:44.30 | Guest |
| 6 | Leonardo Malgor | Argentina | 3:46.52 | |
| 7 | Eduardo Navas | Venezuela | 3:50.60 | |
| 8 | Francisco Figueredo | Paraguay | 3:53.19 | |

=== 5000 meters ===
Final – 14 September

| Rank | Name | Nationality | Time | Notes |
|---|---|---|---|---|
| 1st place, gold medalist(s) | Antonio Serrano | Spain | 13:56.37 | |
| 2nd place, silver medalist(s) | José Carlos Adán | Spain | 13:56.69 | |
| 3rd place, bronze medalist(s) | Antonio Silio | Argentina | 13:59.18 | |
| 4 | José Castillo | Peru | 14:03.54 | |
| 5 | Eduardo Navas | Venezuela | 14:06.93 | |
| 6 | João Ataíde | Brazil | 14:09.25 | |
| 7 | Silveano Simeón | Peru | 14:23.00 | |
| 8 | Marco Pretorotto | Brazil | 14:27.75 | |

=== 10,000 meters ===
Final – 16 September

| Rank | Name | Nationality | Time | Notes |
|---|---|---|---|---|
| 1st place, gold medalist(s) | Antonio Silio | Argentina | 29:27.61 | |
| 2nd place, silver medalist(s) | Juan Carlos Paul | Spain | 29:46.80 | |
| 3rd place, bronze medalist(s) | Carlos de la Torre | Spain | 29:49.19 | |
| 4 | Valdenor dos Santos | Brazil | 30:00.42 | |
| | Doval da Silva | Brazil | 30:39:24 | Guest |
| 5 | Silveano Simeón | Peru | 30:53.23 | |
| 6 | Alfredo Luján | Bolivia | 31:41.63 | |
| 7 | Camilo González | Panama | 35:45.50 | |

=== 3000 meters steeplechase ===
Final – 15 September

| Rank | Name | Nationality | Time | Notes |
|---|---|---|---|---|
| 1st place, gold medalist(s) | Benito Nogales | Spain | 8:38.95 | |
| 2nd place, silver medalist(s) | Ricardo Vera | Uruguay | 8:39.86 | |
| 3rd place, bronze medalist(s) | José Carlos Pereira | Portugal | 8:43.85 | |
| 4 | Antonio Peula | Spain | 8:47.35 | |
| 5 | Clodoaldo do Carmo | Brazil | 8:49.38 | |
| 6 | Carlos Ravani | Brazil | 8:56.17 | |
| 7 | Juan Díaz | Venezuela | 9:00.72 | |

=== 110 meters hurdles ===
Final – 14 September
Wind: -2.5 m/s

| Rank | Name | Nationality | Time | Notes |
|---|---|---|---|---|
| 1st place, gold medalist(s) | Carlos Sala | Spain | 13.97 | |
| 2nd place, silver medalist(s) | Joilto Bonfim | Brazil | 14.04 | |
| 3rd place, bronze medalist(s) | Lyndon Campos | Brazil | 14.61 | |
| 4 | João Lima | Portugal | 14.91 | |
| 5 | Mauro Mina | Peru | 15.46 | |

=== 400 meters hurdles ===
Final – 15 September

| Rank | Name | Nationality | Time | Notes |
|---|---|---|---|---|
| 1st place, gold medalist(s) | Eronilde de Araújo | Brazil | 49.82 | |
| 2nd place, silver medalist(s) | Helio de Oliveira | Brazil | 50.69 | |
| 3rd place, bronze medalist(s) | Pedro Rodrigues | Portugal | 50.96 | |
| 4 | Mauro Mina | Peru | 52.51 | |

=== High jump ===
Final – 15 September

| Rank | Name | Nationality | Attempts | | | | | | | Result | Notes |
| Rank | Name | Nationality | 2.00 | 2.05 | 2.10 | 2.15 | 2.18 | 2.21 | 2.26 | Result | Notes |
|---|---|---|---|---|---|---|---|---|---|---|---|
| 1st place, gold medalist(s) | Arturo Ortiz | Spain | - | - | o | o | - | o | xxx | 2.21 | |
| 2nd place, silver medalist(s) | Luciano Bacelli | Brazil | - | o | o | o | xxx | | | 2.15 | |
| 3rd place, bronze medalist(s) | Gustavo Adolfo Becker | Spain | - | - | o | o | - | xxx | | 2.15 | |
| 4 | Milton Francisco | Brazil | - | o | o | xo | xxx | | | 2.15 | |
| 5 | Fernando Moreno | Argentina | o | o | o | xxo | xxx | | | 2.15 | |
| | Ricardo Valiente | Peru | | | | | | | | NM | |
| | Oscar Valiente | Peru | | | | | | | | NM | |

=== Pole vault ===
Final – 16 September

| Rank | Name | Nationality | Attempts | | | | | | | | | | | Result | Notes |
| Rank | Name | Nationality | 4.40 | 4.50 | 4.60 | 4.70 | 4.80 | 4.90 | 5.00 | 5.05 | 5.15 | 5.20 | 5.30 | Result | Notes |
|---|---|---|---|---|---|---|---|---|---|---|---|---|---|---|---|
| 1st place, gold medalist(s) | Ignacio Paradinas | Spain | - | - | - | - | - | - | xo | - | xo | - | xxx | 5.15 | |
| 2nd place, silver medalist(s) | José Luis Canales | Spain | - | - | - | - | - | - | o | - | - | xxx | | 5.00 | |
| 3rd place, bronze medalist(s) | Guillermo Salgado | Mexico | - | - | o | - | o | o | xxo | xxx | | | | 5.00 | |
| 4 | Miguel Ángel Escoto | Mexico | - | - | - | - | o | - | xxx | | | | | 4.80 | |
| 4 | Oscar Veit | Argentina | - | - | - | - | o | - | xxx | | | | | 4.80 | |
| 4 | Miguel Saldarriaga | Colombia | - | - | - | - | o | - | xxx | | | | | 4.80 | |
| 7 | Cristián Aspillaga | Chile | - | o | - | o | - | xxx | | | | | | 4.70 | |
| 8 | Renato Bortolocci | Brazil | xo | - | o | - | x- | xx | | | | | | 4.60 | |
| | Rodrigo Casacurta | Brazil | | | | | | | | | | | | NM | |

=== Long jump ===
Final – 14 September

| Rank | Name | Nationality | Attempts | | | | | | Result | Notes |
| Rank | Name | Nationality | 1 | 2 | 3 | 4 | 5 | 6 | Result | Notes |
|---|---|---|---|---|---|---|---|---|---|---|
| 1st place, gold medalist(s) | Paulo Sergio de Oliveira | Brazil | 7.81 | 7.61 | 7.61 | 7.72 | 7.61 | 7.82 w | 7.82 w | |
| 2nd place, silver medalist(s) | Ángel Hernández | Spain | 7.73 | 7.58 | 7.52 | 7.62 | 7.70 | 7.75 | 7.75 | |
| 3rd place, bronze medalist(s) | Darío Ruiz | Mexico | 7.46 | x | 7.68 | x | 7.35 | 7.59 | 7.68 | |
| 4 | Carlos Castelbranco | Portugal | 7.23 | 7.39 | 7.36 | 7.68 | 7.51 | 7.48 | 7.68 | |
| 5 | Edson Pessanha Jr. | Brazil | 7.31 | 7.22 | 7.55 | 7.49 | 7.49 | 7.53 | 7.55 | |
| 6 | Luis Alfonso Lourduy | Colombia | 7.39 | 5.99 | - | - | - | - | 7.39 | |
| 7 | Ricardo Valiente | Peru | 7.06 | 5.90 | - | 7.06 | 7.16 | 7.13 | 7.16 | |
| 8 | Fernando Valiente | Peru | 7.06 | 6.90 | 6.93 | 6.76 | x | 6.97 | 7.06 | |

=== Triple jump ===
Final – 16 September

| Rank | Name | Nationality | Attempts | | | | | | Result | Notes |
| Rank | Name | Nationality | 1 | 2 | 3 | 4 | 5 | 6 | Result | Notes |
|---|---|---|---|---|---|---|---|---|---|---|
| 1st place, gold medalist(s) | Anísio Silva | Brazil | x | x | 16.11 | 14.36 | 16.18 | 16.71 | 16.71 | |
| 2nd place, silver medalist(s) | Francisco dos Santos Filho | Brazil | x | 16.11 | 15.85 | x | - | 15.67 | 16.11 | |
| 3rd place, bronze medalist(s) | Ricardo Valiente | Peru | x | x | 15.78 | x | x | 15.64 | 15.78 | |
| 4 | Luis Marto | Portugal | 15.13 | 15.37 | 15.00 | 14.96 | x | x | 15.37 | |
| 5 | Darío Ruiz | Mexico | 14.67 | 14.89 | - | - | - | - | 14.89 | |
| 6 | Oscar Valiente | Peru | x | x | 14.71 | - | x | 14.45 | 14.71 | |

=== Shot put ===
Final – 15 September

| Rank | Name | Nationality | Attempts | | | | | | Result | Notes |
| Rank | Name | Nationality | 1 | 2 | 3 | 4 | 5 | 6 | Result | Notes |
|---|---|---|---|---|---|---|---|---|---|---|
| 1st place, gold medalist(s) | Gert Weil | Chile | 19.58 | 19.58 | x | 18.82 | x | - | 19.58 | |
| 2nd place, silver medalist(s) | Adilson Oliveira | Brazil | 17.25 | 17.13 | 17.34 | 17.08 | 17.23 | 17.34 | 17.34 | |
| 3rd place, bronze medalist(s) | Edson Miguel | Brazil | 14.30 | 16.24 | x | 17.16 | x | x | 17.16 | |
| 4 | Víctor Roca | Spain | - | 16.01 | 15.49 | 16.37 | 15.67 | 16.64 | 16.64 | |
| 5 | Fernando Alves | Portugal | 16.38 | 16.41 | 16.10 | x | 16.05 | x | 16.41 | |
| 6 | Andrés Charadía | Argentina | x | 14.56 | x | x | 15.01 | x | 15.01 | |

=== Discus throw ===
Final – 14 September

| Rank | Name | Nationality | Attempts | | | | | | Result | Notes |
| Rank | Name | Nationality | 1 | 2 | 3 | 4 | 5 | 6 | Result | Notes |
|---|---|---|---|---|---|---|---|---|---|---|
| 1st place, gold medalist(s) | David Martínez | Spain | 53.50 | 51.74 | 57.94 | 56.78 | 56.08 | 59.30 | 59.30 | |
| 2nd place, silver medalist(s) | João Joaquim dos Santos | Brazil | x | x | x | 58.14 | x | x | 58.14 | |
| 3rd place, bronze medalist(s) | Ramón Jiménez Gaona | Paraguay | 56.38 | 54.14 | 54.14 | x | 54.44 | 55.24 | 56.38 | |
| 4 | Fernando Alves | Portugal | x | x | 50.06 | x | x | 52.02 | 52.02 | |
| 5 | Andrés Charadía | Argentina | 51.02 | 51.30 | x | 51.54 | 51.52 | 49.94 | 51.54 | |
| 6 | Jair Teotônio | Brazil | x | 50.58 | x | 50.16 | x | 50.84 | 50.82 | |
| 7 | Francisco Ayala | Mexico | x | 44.60 | x | 43.18 | 43.76 | 47.34 | 47.34 | |

=== Hammer throw ===
Final – 15 September

| Rank | Name | Nationality | Attempts | | | | | | Result | Notes |
| Rank | Name | Nationality | 1 | 2 | 3 | 4 | 5 | 6 | Result | Notes |
|---|---|---|---|---|---|---|---|---|---|---|
| 1st place, gold medalist(s) | Andrés Charadía | Argentina | x | x | 61.82 | 67.04 | 67.10 | 68.98 | 68.98 | |
| 2nd place, silver medalist(s) | Alex Marfull | Spain | 65.26 | x | 63.04 | 60.20 | 64.14 | 60.10 | 65.36 | |
| 3rd place, bronze medalist(s) | Antón María Godall | Spain | 62.12 | 64.32 | x | 64.94 | 61.14 | 63.20 | 64.94 | |
| 4 | Guillermo Guzmán | Mexico | 62.84 | x | 63.82 | x | x | 63.18 | 63.82 | |
| 5 | Marcelo Pugliese | Argentina | 59.94 | 62.16 | x | x | x | 59.64 | 62.16 | |
| 6 | Pedro Rivail Atílio | Brazil | x | x | x | x | 56.68 | 59.92 | 59.92 | |
| 7 | Fernando Alves | Portugal | 56.56 | 58.58 | 55.96 | x | 59.86 | x | 59.86 | |
| 8 | Alexandre Mantovani | Brazil | 53.38 | x | 57.64 | 55.14 | x | x | 57.64 | |
| | Adrián Marzo | Argentina | | | | | | | NM | Guest |

=== Javelin throw ===
Final – 16 September

| Rank | Name | Nationality | Attempts | | | | | | Result | Notes |
| Rank | Name | Nationality | 1 | 2 | 3 | 4 | 5 | 6 | Result | Notes |
|---|---|---|---|---|---|---|---|---|---|---|
| 1st place, gold medalist(s) | Luis Carlos Lucumí | Colombia | 67.10 | 68.54 | 67.80 | 68.22 | 68.22 | 72.74 | 72.74 | |
| 2nd place, silver medalist(s) | Julián Sotelo | Spain | x | 64.46 | 63.58 | 66.92 | 62.56 | 68.10 | 68.10 | |
| 3rd place, bronze medalist(s) | Rodrigo Zelaya | Chile | x | 67.28 | 64.86 | 66.94 | 66.96 | 66.92 | 67.28 | |
| 4 | Celso Kochem | Brazil | 63.18 | 62.58 | 61.08 | 60.08 | 59.66 | 59.94 | 63.18 | |
| 5 | Carlos Cunha | Portugal | 61.00 | 61.60 | 62.54 | 61.26 | 59.72 | x | 62.54 | |
| 6 | Fernando Gubinelli | Argentina | 57.90 | x | 58.82 | 56.88 | 59.28 | 58.96 | 59.28 | |
| 7 | Volmir Zilli | Brazil | 52.26 | 57.82 | 58.26 | x | 56.74 | 58.76 | 58.76 | |

=== Decathlon ===
Final – 14–15 September

The highest mark recorded in each event is highlighted in yellow

| Rank | Name | Nationality | 100m | LJ | SP | HJ | 400m | 110m H | DT | PV | JT | 1500m | Points | Notes |
|---|---|---|---|---|---|---|---|---|---|---|---|---|---|---|
| 1st place, gold medalist(s) | Antonio Peñalver | Spain | 11.58 (-2.2) | 7.43 w (+2.9) | 15.94 | 2.04 | 50.81 | 15.36 (-1.9) | 46.16 | 4.60 | 55.04 | 4:44.55 | 7.824 | |
| 2nd place, silver medalist(s) | José Ricardo Nunes | Brazil | 11.19 (-2.2) | 7.19 w (+2.9) | 12.62 | 1.98 | 48.86 | 15.24 (-1.9) | 38.98 | 4.00 | 58.34 | 4:35.29 | 7.480 | |
| 3rd place, bronze medalist(s) | Álvaro Burrell | Spain | 11.41 (-2.2) | 6.85 w (+2.9) | 13.73 | 1.95 | 48.84 | 15.64 (-1.9) | 43.32 | 4.20 | 39.56 | 4:41.15 | 7.176 | |
| | Francisco Javier Benet | Spain | 11.70 (-2.2) | 7.00 w (+2.9) | 11.52 | 1.86 | 50.42 | 15.36 (-1.9) | 36.52 | 4.60 | 52.98 | 4:41.17 | 7.073 | Guest |
| 4 | Pedro da Silva Filho | Brazil | 11.56 (-2.2) | 7.05 w (+2.9) | 13.91 | 1.92 | 52.49 | 15.35 (-1.9) | 43.56 | NH | 55.70 | 5:10.77 | 6.440 | |

=== 20 kilometers walk ===
Final – 14 September

| Rank | Name | Nationality | Time | Notes |
|---|---|---|---|---|
| 1st place, gold medalist(s) | Carlos Mercenario | Mexico | 1:25:29.5 | |
| 2nd place, silver medalist(s) | Valentí Massana | Spain | 1:25:37.8 | |
| 3rd place, bronze medalist(s) | Cláudio Bertolino | Brazil | 1:32:11.9 | |
| 4 | Orlando Díaz | Colombia | 1:32:42.8 | |
| | Daniel Plaza | Spain | DQ | |

=== 4x100 meters relay ===
Final – 15 September

| Rank | Nation | Competitors | Time | Notes |
|---|---|---|---|---|
| 1st place, gold medalist(s) | Brazil | Antônio dos Santos Filho; Marcelo Brivilati da Silva; Fernando Botasso; Robson da Silva | 40.37 | |
| 2nd place, silver medalist(s) | Spain | Luis Turón; Florencio Gascón; Carlos Sala; Enrique Talavera | 40.49 | |
| 3rd place, bronze medalist(s) | Portugal | Luis Barroso; Fernando Damasio; Pedro Curvelo; Luis Cunha | 40.82 | |

=== 4x400 meters relay ===
Final – 16 September

| Rank | Nation | Competitors | Time | Notes |
|---|---|---|---|---|
| 1st place, gold medalist(s) | Brazil | Inaldo Sena; Helio de Oliveira; Geraldo Maranhão Jr. Eronilde de Araújo | 3:09.2 | |
| 2nd place, silver medalist(s) | Spain | Sergio López; José Alonso; Miguel Cuesta; Manuel Moreno | 3:10.9 | |

== Women's results ==
=== 100 meters ===
Final – 16 September
Wind: +0.6 m/s

| Rank | Name | Nationality | Time | Notes |
|---|---|---|---|---|
| 1st place, gold medalist(s) | Sandra Myers | Spain | 11.50 | |
| 2nd place, silver medalist(s) | Cleide Amaral | Brazil | 11.61 | |
| 3rd place, bronze medalist(s) | Rita Gomes | Brazil | 11.73 | |
| 4 | Lucrécia Jardim | Portugal | 11.76 | |
| 5 | Margarita Martirena | Uruguay | 11.88 | |
| | Claudiléia dos Santos | Brazil | 11.98 | Guest |
| 6 | Denise Sharpe | Argentina | 12.01 | |
| 7 | Carmen García-Campero | Spain | 12.33 | |

=== 200 meters ===
Heat 1 – 15 September
Wind: -1.2 m/s

| Rank | Name | Nationality | Time | Notes |
|---|---|---|---|---|
| 1 | Cristina Castro | Spain | 24.17 | Q |
| 2 | Liliana Chalá | Ecuador | 24.52 | Q |
| 3 | Claudia Acerenza | Uruguay | 24.60 | Q |
| 4 | Denise Sharpe | Argentina | 24.63 | q |
| 5 | Claudiléia dos Santos | Brazil | 24.79 | |
| | Gemma Bergasa | Spain | 25.26 | Guest |

Heat 2 – 15 September
Wind: -0.8 m/s

| Rank | Name | Nationality | Time | Notes |
|---|---|---|---|---|
| 1 | Lucrécia Jardim | Portugal | 24.23 | Q |
| 2 | Olga Conte | Argentina | 24.34 | Q |
| 3 | Rosângela de Souza | Brazil | 24.66 | Q |
| 4 | Blanca Lacambra | Spain | 24.73 | q |
| 5 | María del Carmen Mosegui | Uruguay | 24.88 | |
| 6 | Graciela Maidana | Paraguay | 26.16 | |

Final – 15 September
Wind: -0.1 m/s

| Rank | Name | Nationality | Time | Notes |
|---|---|---|---|---|
| 1st place, gold medalist(s) | Cristina Castro | Spain | 23.63 | |
| 2nd place, silver medalist(s) | Lucrécia Jardim | Portugal | 23.82 | |
| 3rd place, bronze medalist(s) | Olga Conte | Argentina | 23.96 | |
| 4 | Rosângela de Souza | Brazil | 24.40 | |
| 5 | Claudia Acerenza | Uruguay | 24.62 | |
| 6 | Denise Sharpe | Argentina | 24.67 | |
| 7 | Liliana Chalá | Ecuador | 25.21 | |
| | Blanca Lacambra | Spain | DNS | |

=== 400 meters ===
Heat 1 – 14 September

| Rank | Name | Nationality | Time | Notes |
|---|---|---|---|---|
| 1 | Maria Magnólia Figueiredo | Brazil | 51.51 | |
| 2 | Blanca Lacambra | Spain | 53.40 | |
| 3 | Olga Conte | Argentina | 53.85 | |
| 4 | Elsa Amaral | Portugal | 54.32 | |
| 5 | Eliane Silva | Brazil | 54.55 | |
| 6 | Esther Lahoz | Spain | 55.00 | |

Heat 2 – 14 September

| Rank | Name | Nationality | Time | Notes |
|---|---|---|---|---|
| 1 | Claudia Acerenza | Uruguay | 54.69 | |
| 2 | María del Carmen Mosegui | Uruguay | 54.86 | |
| 3 | Maria João Valamatos | Portugal | 56.26 | |
| 4 | Adriana Martínez | Ecuador | 57.50 | |
| 5 | Graciela Maidana | Paraguay | 58.03 | |

Final Standings – 14 September
There was no proper 400m final. Rather, the athletes were classified according to their times achieved in the heat.

| Rank | Name | Nationality | Time | Notes |
|---|---|---|---|---|
| 1st place, gold medalist(s) | Maria Magnólia Figueiredo | Brazil | 51.51 | |
| 2nd place, silver medalist(s) | Blanca Lacambra | Spain | 53.40 | |
| 3rd place, bronze medalist(s) | Olga Conte | Argentina | 53.85 | |
| 4 | Elsa Amaral | Portugal | 54.32 | |
| 5 | Eliane Silva | Brazil | 54.55 | |
| 6 | Claudia Acerenza | Uruguay | 54.69 | |
| 7 | María del Carmen Mosegui | Uruguay | 54.86 | |
| 8 | Esther Lahoz | Spain | 55.00 | |

=== 800 meters ===
Final – 16 September

| Rank | Name | Nationality | Time | Notes |
|---|---|---|---|---|
| 1st place, gold medalist(s) | Maite Zúñiga | Spain | 2:02.22 | |
| 2nd place, silver medalist(s) | Alejandra Ramos | Chile | 2:02.37 | |
| 3rd place, bronze medalist(s) | Elsa Amaral | Portugal | 2:03.57 | |
| 4 | Carla Sacramento | Portugal | 2:04.85 | |
| 5 | Mabel Arrúa | Argentina | 2:07.11 | |
| 6 | Norma Fernández | Argentina | 2:09.09 | |
| 7 | Adriana Martínez | Ecuador | 2:09.37 | |
| 8 | Janeth Caizalitín | Ecuador | 2:09.39 | |
| 9 | Soledad Acerenza | Uruguay | 2:09.68 | |

=== 1500 meters ===
Final – 15 September

| Rank | Name | Nationality | Time | Notes |
|---|---|---|---|---|
| 1st place, gold medalist(s) | Alejandra Ramos | Chile | 4:13.07 | |
| 2nd place, silver medalist(s) | Estela Estévez | Spain | 4:13.96 | |
| 3rd place, bronze medalist(s) | Carla Sacramento | Portugal | 4:15.06 | |
| 4 | Rita de Jesus | Brazil | 4:15.97 | |
| 5 | Norma Fernández | Argentina | 4:16:42 | |
| 6 | Fernanda Ribeiro | Portugal | 4:16.90 | |
| 7 | Janeth Caizalitín | Ecuador | 4:17.70 | |
| 8 | Mabel Arrúa | Argentina | 4:24.74 | |

=== 3000 meters ===
Final – 16 September

| Rank | Name | Nationality | Time | Notes |
|---|---|---|---|---|
| 1st place, gold medalist(s) | Silvana Pereira | Brazil | 9:10.17 | |
| 2nd place, silver medalist(s) | Julia Vaquero | Spain | 9:12.87 | |
| 3rd place, bronze medalist(s) | Fernanda Ribeiro | Portugal | 9:19.44 | |
| 4 | Rita de Jesus | Brazil | 9:25.76 | |
| 5 | Griselda González | Argentina | 9:29.55 | |
| 6 | Dolores Rizo | Spain | 9:39.50 | |

=== 10,000 meters ===
Final – 14 September

| Rank | Name | Nationality | Time | Notes |
|---|---|---|---|---|
| 1st place, gold medalist(s) | Carmen Brunet | Spain | 34:41.95 | |
| 2nd place, silver medalist(s) | Silvana Pereira | Brazil | 35:04.18 | |
| 3rd place, bronze medalist(s) | Marineide dos Santos | Brazil | 35:13.69 | |
| 4 | Griselda González | Argentina | 35:38.99 | |
| 5 | María de la Luz Salazar | Peru | 37:01.93 | |

=== 100 meters hurdles ===
Final – 14 September
Wind: -1.5 m/s

| Rank | Name | Nationality | Time | Notes |
|---|---|---|---|---|
| 1st place, gold medalist(s) | María José Mardomingo | Spain | 13.59 | |
| 2nd place, silver medalist(s) | Carmen Gloria Bezanilla | Chile | 13.80 | |
| 3rd place, bronze medalist(s) | Ana Barrenechea | Spain | 14.01 | |
| 4 | Juraciara da Silva | Brazil | 14.21 | |
| 5 | Emilia Tavares | Portugal | 14.39 | |
| 6 | Magda Quiroga | Brazil | 14.68 | |

=== 400 meters hurdles ===
Heat 1 – 15 September

| Rank | Name | Nationality | Time | Notes |
|---|---|---|---|---|
| 1 | Liliana Chalá | Ecuador | 58.31 | |
| 2 | Miriam Alonso | Spain | 59.20 | |
| 3 | Yolanda Tello | Spain | 59.43 | |
| 4 | Maria João Valamatos | Portugal | 59.85 | |
| 5 | Cornelia Holzinger | Brazil | 1:02.60 | |

Heat 2 – 15 September

| Rank | Name | Nationality | Time | Notes |
|---|---|---|---|---|
| 1 | Carmen Bezanilla | Chile | 1:00.13 | |
| 2 | América Inácio | Brazil | 1:00.32 | |
| 3 | Maribelcy Peña | Colombia | 1:01.82 | |
| 4 | Sandra Izquierdo | Argentina | 1:02.23 | |

Final – 15 September
There was no proper 400m hurdles final. Rather, the athletes were classified according to their times achieved in the heat.

| Rank | Name | Nationality | Time | Notes |
|---|---|---|---|---|
| 1st place, gold medalist(s) | Liliana Chalá | Ecuador | 58.31 | |
| 2nd place, silver medalist(s) | Miriam Alonso | Spain | 59.20 | |
| 3rd place, bronze medalist(s) | Yolanda Tello | Spain | 59.43 | |
| 4 | Maria João Valamatos | Portugal | 59.85 | |
| 5 | Carmen Bezanilla | Chile | 1:00.13 | |
| 6 | América Inácio | Brazil | 1:00.32 | |
| 7 | Maribelcy Peña | Colombia | 1:01.82 | |
| 8 | Sandra Izquierdo | Argentina | 1:02.23 | |

=== High jump ===
Final – 15 September

| Rank | Name | Nationality | Attempts | | | | | Result | Notes |
| Rank | Name | Nationality | 1.70 | 1.75 | 1.78 | 1.81 | 1.84 | Result | Notes |
|---|---|---|---|---|---|---|---|---|---|
| 1st place, gold medalist(s) | Orlane dos Santos | Brazil | - | o | xxo | o | xxx | 1.81 | |
| 2nd place, silver medalist(s) | Mónica Lunkmoss | Brazil | o | o | o | xxx | | 1.78 | |
| 3rd place, bronze medalist(s) | María Belén Saenz | Spain | o | xo | xo | xxx | | 1.78 | |
| 4 | María del Mar Martínez | Spain | o | xxo | xxo | xxx | | 1.78 | |
| 5 | Romary Rifka | Mexico | xxo | xxx | | | | 1.70 | |

=== Long jump ===
Final – 15 September

| Rank | Name | Nationality | Attempts | | | | | | Result | Notes |
| Rank | Name | Nationality | 1 | 2 | 3 | 4 | 5 | 6 | Result | Notes |
|---|---|---|---|---|---|---|---|---|---|---|
| 1st place, gold medalist(s) | Ana Oliveira | Portugal | x | 6.14 | 6.27 | 6.19 | 6.09 | 6.27 | 6.27 | |
| 2nd place, silver medalist(s) | Andrea Ávila | Argentina | 6.02 | 6.08 | 6.06 | 5.89 | 6.07 | 6.15 | 6.16 | |
| 3rd place, bronze medalist(s) | Emilia Tavares | Portugal | 5.95 | 6.05 | 5.85 | x | 6.08 | x | 6.08 | |
| 4 | Gregoria Miranda | Spain | 5.89 | 5.95 | 5.96 | 4.51 | 6.03 | 5.96 | 6.03 | |
| 5 | María Aparecida de Jesus | Brazil | 5.82 | 5.70 | 5.80 | - | - | - | 5.82 | |
| 6 | Romary Rifka | Mexico | x | x | 5.17 | 5.00 | x | 5.03 | 5.17 | |

=== Shot put ===
Final – 14 September

| Rank | Name | Nationality | Attempts | | | | | | Result | Notes |
| Rank | Name | Nationality | 1 | 2 | 3 | 4 | 5 | 6 | Result | Notes |
|---|---|---|---|---|---|---|---|---|---|---|
| 1st place, gold medalist(s) | Elisângela Adriano | Brazil | 15.55 | 15.85 | 15.70 | 15.84 | 15.92 | 16.65 | 16.65 | |
| 2nd place, silver medalist(s) | Margarita Ramos | Spain | 15.90 | 15.46 | 16.26 | 16.08 | 16.12 | 16.26 | 16.26 | |
| 3rd place, bronze medalist(s) | Teresa Machado | Portugal | 14.89 | 15.55 | 15.83 | 15.87 | 15.54 | 15.25 | 15.87 | |
| 4 | Maria Nilba Fernandes | Brazil | 14.59 | 14.49 | 15.22 | x | 14.39 | 14.58 | 15.22 | |

=== Discus throw ===
Final – 16 September

| Rank | Name | Nationality | Attempts | | | | | | Result | Notes |
| Rank | Name | Nationality | 1 | 2 | 3 | 4 | 5 | 6 | Result | Notes |
|---|---|---|---|---|---|---|---|---|---|---|
| 1st place, gold medalist(s) | Teresa Machado | Portugal | 53.92 | 52.82 | 51.22 | 53.42 | 49.18 | 52.32 | 53.92 | |
| 2nd place, silver medalist(s) | Ángeles Barreiro | Spain | 48.20 | 51.78 | x | 50.28 | x | x | 51.78 | |
| | Elisângela Adriano | Brazil | 50.10 | 47.58 | x | x | x | x | 50.10 | Guest |
| 3rd place, bronze medalist(s) | Margarita Ramos | Spain | 43.60 | 49.74 | 48.52 | 49.04 | x | x | 49.74 | |
| 4 | Rosana Piovesan | Brazil | 49.62 | 46.72 | 46.02 | 48.76 | x | x | 49.62 | |
| 5 | Liliana Martinelli | Argentina | 47.98 | 46.90 | 47.48 | x | x | 47.20 | 47.98 | |
| 6 | Graciela Scaglia | Argentina | 42.56 | 43.24 | 44.12 | x | 43.66 | 43.76 | 44.12 | |
| 7 | Amelia Moreira | Brazil | x | 42.70 | 41.82 | 41.82 | x | x | 42.70 | |

=== Javelin throw ===
Final – 15 September

| Rank | Name | Nationality | Attempts | | | | | | Result | Notes |
| Rank | Name | Nationality | 1 | 2 | 3 | 4 | 5 | 6 | Result | Notes |
|---|---|---|---|---|---|---|---|---|---|---|
| 1st place, gold medalist(s) | Mónica Rocha | Brazil | 50.34 | 50.40 | 48.64 | 47.92 | - | - | 50.40 | |
| 2nd place, silver medalist(s) | Zorobabelia Córdoba | Colombia | 38.74 | 36.06 | 43.38 | 43.20 | 44.10 | 40.72 | 44.10 | |
| 3rd place, bronze medalist(s) | Ana Lúcia Silva | Brazil | 32.08 | - | - | - | - | - | 32.08 | |

=== Heptathlon ===
Final – 15 September

The highest mark recorded in each event is highlighted in yellow

| Rank | Name | Nationality | 100m H | HJ | SP | 200m | LJ | JT | 800m | Points | Notes |
|---|---|---|---|---|---|---|---|---|---|---|---|
| 1st place, gold medalist(s) | Orlane dos Santos | Brazil | 14.46 (-2.6) | 1.89 | 12.51 | 25.43 (-2.2) | 5.83 w (+2.2) | 40.66 | 2:29.85 | 5.723 | |
| 2nd place, silver medalist(s) | Ana María Comaschi | Argentina | 14.25 (-2.6) | 1.62 | 12.52 | 24.90 (-2.2) | 5.82 w (+2.2) | 36.36 | 2:19.54 | 5.517 | |
| 3rd place, bronze medalist(s) | Zorobabelia Córdoba | Colombia | 16.09 (-2.6) | 1.65 | 12.06 | 26.30 (-2.2) | 5.86 w (+2.2) | 46.50 | 2:41.29 | 5.091 | |
| 4 | Susana Cruz | Spain | 14.67 (-2.6) | 1.62 | 11.90 | 26.74 (-2.2) | NM | 40.32 | 2:30.89 | 4.388 | |
| 5 | Ana Lúcia Silva | Brazil | 15.37 (-2.6) | 1.71 | 11.11 | 26.61 (-2.2) | 5.35 w (+2.2) | 32.48 | | 4.188 | |
| | Sonia Pérez | Spain | 15.42 (-2.6) | 1.65 | 11.60 | 27.65 (-2.2) | NM | | | DNF | |

=== 10,000 meters walk ===
Final – 15 September

| Rank | Name | Nationality | Time | Notes |
|---|---|---|---|---|
| 1st place, gold medalist(s) | Reyes Sobrino | Spain | 46:36.40 | |
| 2nd place, silver medalist(s) | Emilia Cano | Spain | 48:14.63 | |
| 3rd place, bronze medalist(s) | Elsa Abril | Colombia | 52:07.00 | |
| 4 | Miriam Ramón | Ecuador | 53:18.80 | |
| 5 | Rosemar Piazza | Brazil | 55:12.59 | |
| 6 | Maria Estela Kuhn | Brazil | 59:58.09 | |

=== 4x100 meters relay ===
Final – 15 September

| Rank | Nation | Competitors | Time | Notes |
|---|---|---|---|---|
| 1st place, gold medalist(s) | Brazil | Vânia dos Santos; Claudiléia dos Santos; Rita Gomes; Cleide Amaral | 44.60 | |
| 2nd place, silver medalist(s) | Spain | Blanca Lacambra; Cristina Castro; Carmen García-Campero; Sandra Myers | 45.60 | |
| 3rd place, bronze medalist(s) | Uruguay | Soledad Acerenza; Margarita Martirena; María del Carmen Mosegui; Claudia Acerenza | 47.10 | |

=== 4x400 meters relay ===
Final – 16 September

| Rank | Nation | Competitors | Time | Notes |
|---|---|---|---|---|
| 1st place, gold medalist(s) | Brazil | Maria Magnólia Figueiredo; Eliane Silva; Rosângela de Souza; Soraya Telles | 3:32.8 | |
| 2nd place, silver medalist(s) | Spain | Blanca Lacambra; Esther Lahoz; Gemma Bergasa; Sandra Myers | 3:35.2 | |
| 3rd place, bronze medalist(s) | Uruguay | Soledad Acerenza; Margarita Martirena; Claudia Acerenza; María del Carmen Mosegui | 3:43.6 | |
| 4 | Argentina | Sandra Izquierdo; Norma Fernández; Ana María Comaschi; Olga Conte | 3:44.2 | |
