= 1987 South American Championships in Athletics – Results =

These are the results of the 1987 South American Championships in Athletics which took place at the Estádio Ícaro de Castro Melo in São Paulo, Brazil, between 8 and 11 October.

== Men's results ==
=== 100 metres ===
Heats – 8 October
Wind:
Heat 1: -1.7 m/s, Heat 2: 0.0 m/s

Rank	Heat	Name	Nationality	Time	Notes
1	2	Carlos Moreno	Chile	10.56	Q
2	2	Carlos de Oliveira	Brazil	10.69	Q
3	2	Gerardo Meinardi	Argentina	10.74	Q
4	2	Fernando Espinosa	Ecuador	10.81	q
5	2	Óscar Fernández	Peru	10.91	q
6	1	Robson da Silva	Brazil	10.92	Q
7	2	Luis Dorrego	Uruguay	10.96	
8	1	Héctor Fernández	Chile	11.02	Q
9	1	Oscar Barrionuevo	Argentina	11.03	Q
10	2	Juan Cuellar	Bolivia	11.06	
11	1	Moisés del Castillo	Peru	11.16	
12	1	Luis Amarilla	Paraguay	11.29	
13	1	Guillermo Saucedo	Bolivia	11.30	
14	1	Daniel Ipata	Uruguay	11.42	
15	1	Bolívar Luzuriaga	Ecuador	11.46	

Final – 9 October

Wind: 0.0 m/s

Rank	Name	Nationality	Time	Notes
1st place, gold medalist(s)	Robson da Silva	Brazil	10.39	
2nd place, silver medalist(s)	Carlos Moreno	Chile	10.51	
3rd place, bronze medalist(s)	Carlos de Oliveira	Brazil	10.68	
4	Gerardo Meinardi	Argentina	10.75	
5	Fernando Espinosa	Ecuador	10.81	
6	Héctor Fernández	Chile	10.84	
7	Óscar Fernández	Peru	10.88	
8	Oscar Barrionuevo	Argentina	11.00	

=== 200 metres ===
Heats – 10 October
Wind:
Heat 1: +0.2 m/s, Heat 2: -0.7 m/s

Rank	Heat	Name	Nationality	Time	Notes
1	1	Carlos Moreno	Chile	21.39	Q
1	2	Gerardo Meinardi	Argentina	21.39	Q
3	2	Álvaro Prenafeta	Chile	21.57	Q
4	1	Robson da Silva	Brazil	21.59	Q
5	1	Carlos Gats	Argentina	21.77	Q
6	2	Pedro Miguel da Silva	Brazil	21.91	Q
7	2	Fernando Espinosa	Ecuador	22.06	q
8	1	Juan Cuellar	Bolivia	22.09	q
9	2	Piero Chichizola	Peru	22.58	
10	1	Daniel Ipata	Uruguay	22.67	
11	2	José Rivero	Uruguay	22.70	
12	2	Luis Amarilla	Paraguay	22.89	
13	1	Luis Villalba	Paraguay	23.04	

Final – 11 October

Wind: -0.6 m/s

Rank	Name	Nationality	Time	Notes
1st place, gold medalist(s)	Robson da Silva	Brazil	21.04	
2nd place, silver medalist(s)	Carlos Moreno	Chile	21.41	
3rd place, bronze medalist(s)	Álvaro Prenafeta	Chile	21.48	
4	Gerardo Meinardi	Argentina	21.52	
5	Carlos Gats	Argentina	21.66	
6	Pedro Miguel da Silva	Brazil	21.96	
7	Fernando Espinosa	Ecuador	22.15	
8	Juan Cuellar	Bolivia	22.38	

=== 400 metres ===
Heats – 10 October

Rank	Heat	Name	Nationality	Time	Notes
1	2	Gérson de Souza	Brazil	46.88	Q
2	1	Héctor Daley	Panama	47.26	Q
3	1	Cristián Courbis	Chile	47.39	Q
4	1	Fabián Garbolino	Argentina	47.63	Q
5	2	José María Beduino	Argentina	47.72	Q
6	1	Geraldo de Assis	Brazil	47.73	q
7	2	Jorge Cotito	Peru	48.35	Q
8	1	Moisés del Castillo	Peru	48.40	q
9	1	Santiago Ramírez	Uruguay	49.97	
10	2	Anataniel Guzmán	Uruguay	50.41	
11	2	Arturo Piccardo	Paraguay	50.85	

Final – 11 October

Rank	Name	Nationality	Time	Notes
1st place, gold medalist(s)	Héctor Daley	Panama	45.80	CR
2nd place, silver medalist(s)	Gérson de Souza	Brazil	46.26	
3rd place, bronze medalist(s)	Cristián Courbis	Chile	46.37	
4	José María Beduino	Argentina	46.78	NR
5	Moisés del Castillo	Peru	47.64	
6	Jorge Cotito	Peru	47.70	
7	Geraldo de Assis	Brazil	47.82	
8	Fabián Garbolino	Argentina	48.09	

=== 800 metres ===
Heats – 10 October

Rank	Heat	Name	Nationality	Time	Notes
1	2	Luis Migueles	Argentina	1:53.60	Q
2	2	Valdomiro Manoel	Brazil	1:53.64	Q
3	2	Porfirio Méndez	Paraguay	1:53.99	Q
4	1	Jamir Garcez	Brazil	1:54.29	Q
5	2	Fabián Almeida	Ecuador	1:54.43	q
6	1	Estebán Ojeda	Argentina	1:54.64	Q
7	1	Pablo Squella	Chile	1:55.11	Q
8	1	Francisco Figueredo	Paraguay	1:55.14	q
9	1	Reinaldo Camacho	Peru	1:55.53	

Final – 11 October

Rank	Name	Nationality	Time	Notes
1st place, gold medalist(s)	Luis Migueles	Argentina	1:47.35	
2nd place, silver medalist(s)	Pablo Squella	Chile	1:48.64	
3rd place, bronze medalist(s)	Jamir Garcez	Brazil	1:49.49	
4	Estebán Ojeda	Argentina	1:50.13	
5	Porfirio Méndez	Paraguay	1:51.55	
6	Francisco Figueredo	Paraguay	1:51.69	
7	Valdomiro Manoel	Brazil	1:55.70	
8	Fabián Almeida	Ecuador	1:56.93	

=== 1500 metres ===
9 October

Rank	Name	Nationality	Time	Notes
1st place, gold medalist(s)	Gilson Wiggers	Brazil	3:46.62	
2nd place, silver medalist(s)	Emilio Ulloa	Chile	3:46.69	
3rd place, bronze medalist(s)	Manuel Balmaceda	Chile	3:47.43	
4	Elias de Moura	Brazil	3:48.38	
5	Eduardo Robles	Argentina	3:48.61	
6	Carlos Naput	Argentina	3:50.30	
7	Ricardo Vera	Uruguay	3:50.91	
8	Francisco Figueredo	Paraguay	3:54.18	

=== 5000 metres ===
8 October

Rank	Name	Nationality	Time	Notes
1st place, gold medalist(s)	Rolando Vera	Ecuador	14:03.0	
2nd place, silver medalist(s)	Florindo Correia	Brazil	14:04.6	
3rd place, bronze medalist(s)	Omar Aguilar	Chile	14:05.5	
4	Juan Pablo Juárez	Argentina	14:07.7	
5	Néstor Jami	Ecuador	14:30.8	
6	Antonio Silio	Argentina	14:36.0	
7	Ramón López	Paraguay	14:42.6	
8	Jorge Rojas	Chile	14:50.5	

=== 10,000 metres ===
9 October

Rank	Name	Nationality	Time	Notes
1st place, gold medalist(s)	Juan Pablo Juárez	Argentina	29:18.39	
2nd place, silver medalist(s)	Rolando Vera	Ecuador	29:19.16	
3rd place, bronze medalist(s)	Omar Aguilar	Chile	29:30.01	
4	Diamantino dos Santos	Brazil	29:30.64	
5	Néstor Jami	Ecuador	30:43.02	

=== Marathon ===
11 October

Rank	Name	Nationality	Time	Notes
1st place, gold medalist(s)	Osmiro Silva	Brazil	2:21:06	
2nd place, silver medalist(s)	José César Souza	Brazil	2:24:49	
3rd place, bronze medalist(s)	Wilson Pérez	Ecuador	2:26:22	
4	Rubén Aguiar	Argentina	2:28:18	
5	Nelson Zamora	Uruguay	2:30:04	
6	Luciano Leyton	Chile	2:42:50	

=== 110 metres hurdles ===
11 October
Wind: -0.8 m/s

Rank	Name	Nationality	Time	Notes
1st place, gold medalist(s)	Lyndon Campos	Brazil	14.13	
2nd place, silver medalist(s)	Joilto Bonfim	Brazil	14.54	
3rd place, bronze medalist(s)	Carlos Varas	Argentina	14.55	
4	Juan Carlos Fuentes	Chile	14.70	
5	Javier del Río	Peru	14.76	
6	Fernando Valiente	Peru	15.24	
7	Rubén Bortolín	Argentina	15.76	

=== 400 metres hurdles ===
9 October

Rank	Name	Nationality	Time	Notes
1st place, gold medalist(s)	Pablo Squella	Chile	50.42	
2nd place, silver medalist(s)	Antônio Ferreira	Brazil	50.67	
3rd place, bronze medalist(s)	Carlos dos Santos	Brazil	52.43	
4	Dardo Angerami	Argentina	52.55	
5	Fernando Marzano	Argentina	53.91	
6	Javier Rodríguez	Ecuador	56.74	

=== 3000 metres steeplchase ===
10 October

Rank	Name	Nationality	Time	Notes
1st place, gold medalist(s)	Emilio Ulloa	Chile	8:51.41	
2nd place, silver medalist(s)	Carlos Naput	Argentina	8:53.84	
3rd place, bronze medalist(s)	Ricardo Vera	Uruguay	8:58.99	
4	Ramón López	Paraguay	9:05.17	
5	Pedro Graciotti	Brazil	9:10.99	
6	Wilson de Santana	Brazil	9:20.46	

=== 4 × 100 metres relay ===
11 October

Rank	Nation	Competitors	Time	Notes
1st place, gold medalist(s)	Brazil	Carlos de Oliveira, Pedro Miguel da Silva, Reginaldo Sanches, Robson da Silva	40.17	
2nd place, silver medalist(s)	Argentina	Oscar Barrionuevo, Carlos Gats, José María Beduino, Gerardo Meinardi	40.72	
3rd place, bronze medalist(s)	Chile	Carlos Moreno, Álvaro Prenafeta, Juan Carlos Fuentes, Héctor Fernández	40.75	
4	Peru	Óscar Fernández, Moisés del Castillo, Jorge Cotito, Javier del Río	42.04	
5	Uruguay	Anataniel Guzmán, Luis Dorrego, Daniel Ipata, José Rivero	42.26	
6	Paraguay	Juan Cabrera, Luis Amarilla, Luis Villalba, Arturo Piccardo	43.18	
7	Ecuador	Bolívar Luzuriaga, Fabián Almeida, Fernando Espinosa, Fidel Solórzano	43.36	

=== 4 × 400 metres relay ===
9 October

Rank	Nation	Competitors	Time	Notes
1st place, gold medalist(s)	Chile	Cristián Courbis, Manuel Balmaceda, Pablo Squella, Carlos Morales	3:07.64	CR
2nd place, silver medalist(s)	Brazil	Nilson Neri, Paulo César de Souza, Gérson de Souza, Geraldo de Assis	3:08.43	
3rd place, bronze medalist(s)	Argentina	Fabián Garbolino, Dardo Angerami, Luis Migueles, José María Beduino	3:10.36	
4	Peru	Piero Chichizola, Jorge Cotito, Javier del Río, Moisés del Castillo	3:12.62	
5	Uruguay	Daniel Ipata, José Rivero, Santiago Ramírez, Anataniel Guzmán	3:18.68	
6	Ecuador	José Quiñaliza, Javier Rodríguez, Fabián Almeida, Fernando Espinosa	3:18.81	
7	Paraguay	Porfirio Méndez, Francisco Figueredo, Luis Villalba, Arturo Piccardo	3:22.00	

=== 20 kilometres walk ===
10 October

Rank	Name	Nationality	Time	Notes
1st place, gold medalist(s)	Cláudio Bertolino	Brazil	1:38:34	
2nd place, silver medalist(s)	Jorge Yannone	Argentina	1:39:12	
3rd place, bronze medalist(s)	Juan Pablo Canevaro	Chile	1:40:51	
4	Luis Alberto Parada	Chile	1:43:09	
5	Juan Rojas	Ecuador	1:44:24	

=== High jump ===
11 October

Rank	Name	Nationality	Result	Notes
1st place, gold medalist(s)	Fernando Moreno	Argentina	2.17	=CR
2nd place, silver medalist(s)	Fernando Pastoriza	Argentina	2.17	
3rd place, bronze medalist(s)	Milton Francisco	Brazil	2.14	
4	Luciano Bacelli	Brazil	2.08	
5	Juan Carlos Silva	Uruguay	2.05	
6	Fernando Valiente	Peru	2.00	
7	Luis Villar	Chile	1.95	
7	Claudio Pinto	Bolivia	1.95	

=== Pole vault ===
10 October

Rank	Name	Nationality	Result	Notes
1st place, gold medalist(s)	Oscar Veit	Argentina	5.25	CR
2nd place, silver medalist(s)	Thomas Riether	Chile	5.15	
3rd place, bronze medalist(s)	Renato Bortolocci	Brazil	5.05	
4	Fernando Moreno	Argentina	4.60	

=== Long jump ===
9 October

Rank	Name	Nationality	Result	Notes
1st place, gold medalist(s)	Paulo de Oliveira	Brazil	7.65	
2nd place, silver medalist(s)	Fernando Valiente	Peru	7.56	
3rd place, bronze medalist(s)	Ricardo Valiente	Peru	7.45	
4	Jorge da Silva	Brazil	7.35	
5	Fidel Solórzano	Ecuador	7.11	
6	Olegario Olmedo	Paraguay	7.10	
7	Oscar Diesel	Paraguay	6.99	
8	José Quiñaliza	Ecuador	6.92	

=== Triple jump ===
8 October

Rank	Name	Nationality	Result	Notes
1st place, gold medalist(s)	Jorge da Silva	Brazil	16.24	
2nd place, silver medalist(s)	Abcélvio Rodrigues	Brazil	16.11	
3rd place, bronze medalist(s)	José Quiñaliza	Ecuador	15.77	
4	Ricardo Valiente	Peru	15.58	
5	Oscar Diesel	Paraguay	14.99	
6	Alejandro Gats	Argentina	14.91	
7	Arturo Piccardo	Paraguay	14.80	
8	Francisco Pichott	Chile	14.14	

=== Shot put ===
9 October

Rank	Name	Nationality	Result	Notes
1st place, gold medalist(s)	Gert Weil	Chile	19.35	
2nd place, silver medalist(s)	Adilson Oliveira	Brazil	18.04	
3rd place, bronze medalist(s)	Gerardo Carucci	Argentina	16.70	
4	Idi de Paula	Brazil	16.36	
5	Ubaldo Peñalba	Argentina	15.53	
6	Oscar Gadea	Uruguay	14.70	

=== Discus throw ===
10 October

Rank	Name	Nationality	Result	Notes
1st place, gold medalist(s)	Carlos Bryner	Argentina	55.34	CR
2nd place, silver medalist(s)	José Jacques	Brazil	54.46	
3rd place, bronze medalist(s)	João Joaquim dos Santos	Brazil	51.16	
4	Gert Weil	Chile	50.66	
5	Ubaldo Peñalba	Argentina	47.86	
6	Jorge Herrán	Uruguay	42.58	
7	Oscar Gadea	Uruguay	40.04	

=== Hammer throw ===
8 October

Rank	Name	Nationality	Result	Notes
1st place, gold medalist(s)	Andrés Charadía	Argentina	66.72	CR
2nd place, silver medalist(s)	Pedro Rivail Atílio	Brazil	62.68	
3rd place, bronze medalist(s)	Adrián Marzo	Argentina	59.94	
4	Raúl Ramón	Ecuador	47.52	
5	Ivam Bertelli	Brazil	43.84	

=== Javelin throw ===
11 October

Rank	Name	Nationality	Result	Notes
1st place, gold medalist(s)	Nivaldo Beje Filho	Brazil	64.46	CR
2nd place, silver medalist(s)	Rodrigo Zelaya	Chile	64.06	
3rd place, bronze medalist(s)	Jorge Parraguirre	Chile	63.98	
4	Fernando Gubinelli	Argentina	63.24	
5	Orion Pedroso	Brazil	62.64	
6	Walter Franzantti	Argentina	61.68	
7	Mario Alaniz	Uruguay	61.68	
8	Fernando Peñafiel	Ecuador	59.98	

=== Decathlon ===
8–9 October

The highest mark recorded in each event is highlighted in yellow

Rank	Athlete	Nationality	100m	LJ	SP	HJ	400m	110m H	DT	PV	JT	1500m	Points	Notes
1st place, gold medalist(s)	Paulo Lima	Brazil	10.96	6.61	14.69	1.87	47.77	15.79	45.20	4.20	54.36	4:48.6	7491	
2nd place, silver medalist(s)	Fidel Solórzano	Ecuador	11.06	7.47	10.07	2.02	50.29	15.39	37.98	3.60	49.48	5:03.0	6947	
3rd place, bronze medalist(s)	Carlos Martín	Argentina	11.37	6.61	13.45	1.90	50.37	16.29	41.28	4.00	47.84	4:45.0	6924	
4	Antônio Balbuena	Brazil	11.44	6.47	12.28	1.84	51.39	16.06	35.68	4.00	47.46	4:42.0	6631	
5	Rubén Bortolín	Argentina	11.56	6.29	10.99	2.02	50.98	15.49	34.02	3.90	41.54	4:40.7	6596	
6	Alberto Bejarano	Bolivia	12.07	6.03	10.31	1.75	54.78	16.07	31.40	2.50	37.36	4:56.5	5370	
7	Jorge Herrán	Uruguay	11.8	6.29	11.99	1.78	56.27	19.72	32.72	2.20	51.24	5:20.5	5219	

== Women's results ==
=== 100 metres ===
Heats – 10 October
Wind:
Heat 1: -0.2 m/s, Heat 2: 0.0 m/s

Rank	Heat	Name	Nationality	Time	Notes
1	2	Deborah Bell	Argentina	11.83	Q
2	2	Ximena Restrepo	Colombia	12.01	Q
3	1	Inês Ribeiro	Brazil	12.10	Q
4	1	Claudia Acerenza	Uruguay	12.13	Q
5	1	Liliana Chalá	Ecuador	12.19	Q
6	2	Roberta Correa	Brazil	12.36	Q
7	2	Margarita Martiarena	Uruguay	12.37	q
8	1	Milagros Allende	Argentina	12.44	q
9	2	Daysi Salas	Chile	12.45	
10	1	Claudia Hoelzel	Chile	12.50	
11	2	Corina Ordóñez	Ecuador	12.63	

Final – 11 October

Wind: 0.0 m/s

Rank	Name	Nationality	Time	Notes
1st place, gold medalist(s)	Deborah Bell	Argentina	11.68	
2nd place, silver medalist(s)	Ximena Restrepo	Colombia	11.77	
3rd place, bronze medalist(s)	Inês Ribeiro	Brazil	11.91	
4	Claudia Acerenza	Uruguay	11.96	
5	Liliana Chalá	Ecuador	11.97	
6	Milagros Allende	Argentina	12.21	
7	Margarita Martiarena	Uruguay	12.34	
8	Roberta Correa	Brazil	12.35	

=== 200 metres ===
Heats – 8 October
Wind:
Heat 1: -0.1 m/s, Heat 2: -1.3 m/s

Rank	Heat	Name	Nationality	Time	Notes
1	1	Ximena Restrepo	Colombia	24.00	Q
2	2	Liliana Chalá	Ecuador	24.28	Q
3	2	Deborah Bell	Argentina	24.42	Q
4	1	Claudia Acerenza	Uruguay	24.48	Q
5	2	Inês Ribeiro	Brazil	24.60	Q
6	1	Olga Conte	Argentina	24.75	Q
7	1	Jupira da Graça	Brazil	24.78	q
8	2	Margarita Martiarena	Uruguay	25.31	q
9	1	Daysi Salas	Chile	25.54	
10	2	Claudia Hoelzel	Chile	25.59	

Final – 9 October

Wind: +0.9 m/s

Rank	Name	Nationality	Time	Notes
1st place, gold medalist(s)	Ximena Restrepo	Colombia	23.49	
2nd place, silver medalist(s)	Liliana Chalá	Ecuador	23.74	
3rd place, bronze medalist(s)	Deborah Bell	Argentina	23.87	
4	Claudia Acerenza	Uruguay	24.16	
5	Inês Ribeiro	Brazil	24.22	
6	Jupira da Graça	Brazil	24.57	
7	Olga Conte	Argentina	24.60	
8	Margarita Martiarena	Uruguay	25.35	

=== 400 metres ===
11 October

Rank	Name	Nationality	Time	Notes
1st place, gold medalist(s)	Liliana Chalá	Ecuador	52.9	CR
2nd place, silver medalist(s)	Suzette Montalvão	Brazil	53.7	
3rd place, bronze medalist(s)	Soledad Acerenza	Uruguay	55.2	
4	Ismenia Guzmán	Chile	55.5	
5	Laura de Falco	Argentina	56.0	
6	Olga Conte	Argentina	56.2	
7	Ingrid Rosero	Ecuador	57.7	
8	Virginia Guerra	Uruguay	59.7	

=== 800 metres ===
11 October

Rank	Name	Nationality	Time	Notes
1st place, gold medalist(s)	Soraya Telles	Brazil	2:07.71	
2nd place, silver medalist(s)	Graciela Mardones	Chile	2:09.21	
3rd place, bronze medalist(s)	Luiza do Nascimento	Brazil	2:09.39	
4	Gina Toledo	Chile	2:12.97	
5	Viviana Cortés	Argentina	2:16.95	
6	Sonia Galdos	Peru	2:17.51	

=== 1500 metres ===
8 October

Rank	Name	Nationality	Time	Notes
1st place, gold medalist(s)	Soraya Telles	Brazil	4:29.9	
2nd place, silver medalist(s)	Rita de Jesus	Brazil	4:30.9	
3rd place, bronze medalist(s)	Graciela Mardones	Chile	4:33.9	
4	Gina Toledo	Chile	4:35.7	
5	María Martínez	Argentina	4:38.2	
6	Sonia Galdos	Peru	4:40.2	
7	María Medina	Ecuador	4:50.7	

=== 3000 metres ===
11 October

Rank	Name	Nationality	Time	Notes
1st place, gold medalist(s)	Mónica Regonesi	Chile	9:47.30	
2nd place, silver medalist(s)	Martha Tenorio	Ecuador	10:02.63	
3rd place, bronze medalist(s)	María Martínez	Argentina	10:05.93	
4	Olga Caccaviello	Argentina	10:13.77	
5	María Medina	Ecuador	10:32.32	
6	Claudia do Nascimento	Brazil	10:36.90	
7	Maria Santana	Brazil	10:48.90	

=== 10,000 metres ===
8 October

Rank	Name	Nationality	Time	Notes
1st place, gold medalist(s)	Angélica de Almeida	Brazil	34:59.2	
2nd place, silver medalist(s)	Mónica Regonesi	Chile	35:00.6	
3rd place, bronze medalist(s)	Martha Tenorio	Ecuador	35:11.5	
4	María Teresa Paucar	Ecuador	35:34.4	
5	Stella Selles	Argentina	35:45.4	
6	Magaly dos Santos	Brazil	37:24.2	
7	Olga Caccaviello	Argentina	38:01.3	

=== 100 metres hurdles ===
11 October
Wind: -0.3 m/s

Rank	Name	Nationality	Time	Notes
1st place, gold medalist(s)	Carmen Bezanilla	Chile	14.22	
2nd place, silver medalist(s)	Carolina Gutiérrez	Argentina	14.34	
3rd place, bronze medalist(s)	Alejandra Martínez	Chile	14.49	
4	Lucy da Conceição	Brazil	14.71	
5	Ana María Núñez	Uruguay	15.32	
6	Margit Weise	Brazil	15.38	

=== 400 metres hurdles ===
9 October

Rank	Name	Nationality	Time	Notes
1st place, gold medalist(s)	Liliana Chalá	Ecuador	58.46	CR
2nd place, silver medalist(s)	Maria do Carmo Fialho	Brazil	59.92	
3rd place, bronze medalist(s)	Margit Weise	Brazil	1:00.05	
4	Adriana Martínez	Ecuador	1:03.12	
5	Anabella von Kesselstatt	Argentina	1:03.35	
6	Ana María Núñez	Uruguay	1:03.56	
7	Ismenia Guzmán	Chile	1:04.98	
8	Mónica Delfino	Chile	1:05.77	

=== 4 × 100 metres relay ===
11 October

Rank	Nation	Competitors	Time	Notes
1st place, gold medalist(s)	Argentina	Milagros Allende, Olga Conte, Laura de Falco, Deborah Bell	45.45	
2nd place, silver medalist(s)	Brazil	Iara Ribeiro, Jupira da Graça, Roberta Correa, Inês Ribeiro	45.78	
3rd place, bronze medalist(s)	Uruguay	Rossana Biasco, Margarita Martiarena, Soledad Acerenza, Claudia Acerenza	46.54	
4	Chile	Alejandra Martínez, Carmen Bezanilla, Daysi Salas, Claudia Hoelzel	46.63	
5	Ecuador	Adriana Martínez, Corina Ordóñez, Ingrid Rosero, Liliana Chalá	49.13	

=== 4 × 400 metres relay ===
9 October

Rank	Nation	Competitors	Time	Notes
1st place, gold medalist(s)	Brazil	Suzette Montalvão, Soraya Telles, Maria do Carmo Fialho, Eliane Silva	3:38.13	CR
2nd place, silver medalist(s)	Argentina	Viviana Cortés, Olga Conte, Milagros Allende, Laura de Falco	3:43.56	
3rd place, bronze medalist(s)	Chile	Carmen Bezanilla, Claudia Hoelzel, Graciela Mardones, Ismenia Guzmán	3:43.61	
4	Uruguay	Virginia Guerra, Soledad Acerenza, Margarita Martiarena, Claudia Acerenza	3:47.46	
5	Ecuador	Liliana Chalá, Cristina Bustamante, Adriana Martínez, Ingrid Rosero	3:49.64	

=== High jump ===
8 October

Rank	Name	Nationality	Result	Notes
1st place, gold medalist(s)	Orlane dos Santos	Brazil	1.80	
2nd place, silver medalist(s)	Liliana Lohmann	Brazil	1.73	
3rd place, bronze medalist(s)	Carmen Garib	Chile	1.70	
4	Carmen Bezanilla	Chile	1.70	
5	Claudia Blotto	Argentina	1.65	

=== Long jump ===
10 October

Rank	Name	Nationality	Result	Notes
1st place, gold medalist(s)	Rita Slompo	Brazil	6.17	
2nd place, silver medalist(s)	Ana Martina Vizioli	Argentina	6.01	
3rd place, bronze medalist(s)	Orlane dos Santos	Brazil	5.90	
4	Isabel Oliva	Chile	5.89	
5	Carolina Gutiérrez	Argentina	5.66	
6	Carmen Garib	Chile	5.12	

=== Shot put ===
11 October

Rank	Name	Nationality	Result	Notes
1st place, gold medalist(s)	Maria Fernandes	Brazil	14.49	
2nd place, silver medalist(s)	Berenice da Silva	Uruguay	14.36	
3rd place, bronze medalist(s)	Eliane Campos	Brazil	13.88	
4	Luz María Quiñonez	Ecuador	12.34	
5	Sonia Favre	Argentina	12.21	
6	Daphne Birnios	Argentina	12.14	
7	Gloria Martínez	Chile	10.88	
8	Elvira Yufra	Peru	10.70	

=== Discus throw ===
9 October

Rank	Name	Nationality	Result	Notes
1st place, gold medalist(s)	Luz María Quiñonez	Ecuador	48.00	
2nd place, silver medalist(s)	Marcia Barbosa	Brazil	45.66	
3rd place, bronze medalist(s)	Gloria Martínez	Chile	44.66	
4	Daphne Birnios	Argentina	44.26	
5	Elvira Yufra	Peru	43.62	
6	Berenice da Silva	Uruguay	43.28	
7	Liliana Olguín	Argentina	42.52	
8	Patricia Alcarraz	Uruguay	41.66	

=== Javelin throw ===
8 October

Rank	Name	Nationality	Result	Notes
1st place, gold medalist(s)	Sueli dos Santos	Brazil	56.00	CR
2nd place, silver medalist(s)	Bertha Gómez	Colombia	47.62	
3rd place, bronze medalist(s)	Sonia Favre	Argentina	46.68	
4	Carolina Weil	Chile	44.08	
5	Carla Bispo	Brazil	43.60	

=== Heptathlon ===
10–11 October

The highest mark recorded in each event is highlighted in yellow

Rank	Athlete	Nationality	100m H	HJ	SP	200m	LJ	JT	800m	Points	Notes
1st place, gold medalist(s)	Conceição Geremias	Brazil	14.29	1.75	13.34	25.68	5.80	37.30	2:28.18	5550	
2nd place, silver medalist(s)	Carmen Bezanilla	Chile	14.27	1.63	10.67	25.15	5.65	30.20	2:28.48	5066	
3rd place, bronze medalist(s)	Carolina Gutiérrez	Argentina	14.28	1.60	10.71	25.74	5.65	23.88	2:32.49	4765	
4	Liliana Lohmann	Brazil	17.69	1.72	10.59	32.07	4.95	28.42	3:16.23	3557	
