= Rolando Vera (runner) =

Ecuadorian long-distance runner (born 1965)

Personal information
- Full name: Rolando Patricio Vera Rodas
- Born: April 27, 1965 (age 61) Cuenca, Azuay, Ecuador

Sport
- Country: Ecuador
- Sport: Men's athletics

Achievements and titles
- Olympic finals: 1988 Summer Olympics; 1992 Summer Olympics; 1996 Summer Olympics
- Personal bests: 5000m: 13:43.23; 10,000m: 27:54.33
Medal record
Men's athletics
Representing Ecuador
Pan American Games
Silver medal – second place	1987 Indianapolis	5000 m
South American Games
Gold medal – first place	1986 Santiago	10,000 m
Silver medal – second place	1986 Santiago	5,000 m
South American Championships
Gold medal – first place	1987 São Paulo	5000 m
Gold medal – first place	1989 Medellín	10,000 m
Silver medal – second place	1987 São Paulo	10,000 m
Bolivarian Games
Gold medal – first place	1989 Maracaibo	10,000 m
Gold medal – first place	1993 Cochabamba	10,000 m
Silver medal – second place	1989 Maracaibo	5000 m

Rolando Patricio Vera Rodas (born April 27, 1965 in Cuenca, Azuay) is a retired long-distance runner from Ecuador, who represented his native country at three consecutive Summer Olympics, starting in 1988. He reached the top ten of the 10,000 metres at the 1987 World Championships in Athletics. He enjoyed much championship success at the regional level: he was a two-time South American Champion on the track and won gold medals at the South American Games and Bolivarian Games, as well as reaching the podium at the Ibero-American Championships and the 1987 Pan American Games.

He won road running competitions on four continents and was tenth at the 1994 IAAF World Half Marathon Championships. Vera won the Saint Silvester Road Race four times consecutively in the 1980s. In 1995 he won both the Los Angeles Marathon and the Chuncheon Marathon, and he won the Beppu-Ōita Marathon two years later. At Olympic level he competed in the marathon on two occasions (1992 and 1996). He remains the Ecuadorian record holder over 20 km and the half marathon. His personal best in the marathon is 2:10:46 – a time which brought him third at the 1990 Boston Marathon.

== Career ==
=== Early competition ===
He began his career on the track and was fourth over 5000 metres in 14:24.16 at the 1984 Pan American Junior Championships. He also took part in the 2000 m steeplechase, where he finished in sixth. Taking part in the regional competition at the 1986 South American Games, he beat the field (which included continental champion Emilio Ulloa) to win in 28:53.90. His first major senior medal came when he took the 10,000 metres bronze medal at the 1986 Ibero-American Championships. He also won the Saint Silvester Road Race that year – a competition he won four times consecutively up to 1989. Other road victories over this period included the Cherry Creek Sneak 5 Mile in 1986, the Cascade Run Off in 1987, and the Bolder Boulder race in 1989.

At the 1987 South American Championships in Athletics he won the 5000 m gold medal and a silver medal in the 10,000 m. Out on the road that year, he took victory at the seven-mile Falmouth Road Race. A second silver of the season at the 1987 Pan American Games (behind Bruce Bickford) preceded his global debut at the 1987 World Championships in Athletics, where he finished in tenth and was the only South American athlete in the race. His time of 28:20.24 was also a record for a South American under-23 athlete.

At the 1988 Bolder Boulder he won the 10k with a time of 29:07. Rosa Mota won the women's 10k that year.

=== Olympic debut ===
Vera made his Olympic debut at the 1988 Seoul Olympics and reached the final of the 10,000 m, finishing in 15th place. He topped the podium in the men's 10,000 m at the 1989 South American Championships in Athletics, winning his first continental title. He doubled up at the 1989 Bolivarian Games and won the 10,000 m as well as taking silver in the 5000 m behind Peru's José Castillo. Vera ran at the Boston Marathon in April 1990 and finished in third place with a personal best time of 2:10:46. A month later he competed in the inaugural Trib 10K race in San Diego and, although still tired from his efforts in Boston, he won the race in an Ecuadorian record time of 28:08 minutes. In 1991, he was the winner of the Philadelphia Distance Run.

His third appearance on the global stage came at the 1992 Summer Olympics and he moved off the track and up to the marathon distance. He finished in 43rd place, although this was the second best performance by a South American after Brazil's Osmiro Silva. He also won a bronze over 10,000 m at the 1992 Ibero-American Championships, repeating his performance of four years earlier. The following year Vera retained his 10,000 m title at the 1993 Bolivarian Games. In 1994, he won the Parelloop 10 km race in the Netherlands and went on to finish tenth at the 1994 IAAF World Half Marathon Championships in Oslo later that year – setting a national record mark of 1:01:36 for the half marathon distance. On the circuit that year he also won at the Marvejols-Mende in France.

=== Los Angeles winner ===
He began 1995 with a win at the San Blas Half Marathon in Puerto Rico, and continued his winning ways at the Los Angeles Marathon where he ran a very tactical race, which was held in poor weather conditions. Vera's outright refusal to take his turn at the front of the leading pack (and thus bear his share of the wind and rain) angered the reigning marathon world champion Mark Plaatjes. After 20 miles, Vera tucked in behind the only remaining leader Bob Kempainen and defied Kempainen's attempts to shake him off – following his zig-zag movements across the road. Finally taking the lead in the final stages, Vera enjoyed a tailwind and won the race in 2:11:39 (twenty seconds ahead of the other runners). Kempainen later commented: "I kept trying to get him out front to take the lead, but I couldn't very well turn around and ask him to do it...I guess he ran it smart".

He also went on to win at the Chuncheon Marathon that year. He enjoyed success over the 20 km distance, winning at the Ogden Newspapers 20K in 1995 and the following year. Vera's final Olympic appearance was at the 1996 Atlanta Games and he was ranked 22nd in the men's Olympic marathon race. He won the Beppu-Ōita Marathon in 1997 with a time of 2:12:00.

== International competitions ==
Year	Competition	Venue	Position	Event	Notes
Representing Ecuador
1986	Goodwill Games	Moscow, Soviet Union	9th	10,000 m	28:43.01
1986	Ibero-American Championships	Havana, Cuba	3rd	10,000 m	30:10.05
1986	South American Games	Santiago, Chile	2nd	5,000 m	14:09.21
1986	South American Games	Santiago, Chile	1st	10,000 m	28:53.90
1987	Pan American Games	Indianapolis, United States	2nd	10,000 m	28:22.56
1987	World Championships	Rome, Italy	10th	10,000 m	28:20.24
1987	South American Championships	São Paulo, Brazil	1st	5,000 m	14:03.00
1987	South American Championships	São Paulo, Brazil	2nd	10,000 m	29:19.16
1988	Olympic Games	Seoul, South Korea	15th	10,000 m	28:17.64
1989	South American Championships	Medellín, Colombia	1st	10,000 m	29:28.1 A
1989	Bolivarian Games	Maracaibo, Venezuela	2nd	5000 m	14:24.64
1989	Bolivarian Games	Maracaibo, Venezuela	1st	10,000 m	29:54.22
1990	Boston Marathon	Boston, United States	3rd	Marathon	2:10:46
1991	Boston Marathon	Boston, United States	13th	Marathon	2:15:46
1991	New York City Marathon	New York City, United States	14th	Marathon	2:17:21
1992	Ibero-American Championships	Seville, Spain	3rd	10,000 m	28:55.16
1992	Olympic Games	Barcelona, Spain	43rd	Marathon	2:21:30
1993	World Championships	Stuttgart, Germany	—	10,000 m	DNF
1993	Bolivarian Games	Cochabamba, Bolivia	1st	10,000 m	30:16.49 A
1994	London Marathon	London, United Kingdom	9th	Marathon	2:11:15
1995	Los Angeles Marathon	Los Angeles, United States	1st	Marathon	2:11:39
1995	Pan American Games	Mar del Plata, Argentina	–	Marathon	DNF
1995	Chuncheon Marathon	Chuncheon, South Korea	1st	Marathon	2:11:30
1996	Olympic Games	Atlanta, Georgia	22nd	Marathon	2:17:40
1997	Beppu-Ōita Marathon	Beppu-Ōita, Japan	1st	Marathon	2:12:00
1998	Tokyo Marathon	Tokyo, Japan	9th	Marathon	2:13:09
