= 1990 Ibero-American Championships in Athletics =

IV Ibero-American Championships
- Dates: 14 – 16 September 1990
- Host city: Manaus, Brazil
- Venue: Vila Olímpica de Manaus
- Events: 40
- Participation: 205 athletes from 14 nations
- Records set: 6 Championships records

The 1990 Ibero-American Championships in Athletics (Spanish: IV Campeonato Iberoamericano de Atletismo) was the fourth edition of the international athletics competition between Ibero-American nations which was held at the Vila Olímpica in Manaus, Brazil from 14–16 September. Forty event finals were held and six championships records were set in Manaus.

The competition was beset with organisational problems and schedule clashes. Cuba, which had previously sent large delegations, was absent. Temperatures were extremely high - 40 °C (104 °F) - during the three-day competition and consequently the plans for the marathon races, scheduled for the final day, were abandoned. The 1990 Central American and Caribbean Games was held in Mexico two months later and preparation for this larger meet meant other athletes chose not to compete at the Ibero-American Championships. As a result, many of the events were principally contested between the top Brazilian and Spanish athletes, who won 31 of the 40 gold medals available between them. Brazil won the most event, with 17 golds and 37 in total, while Spain had the most medals overall with 43 (14 of them gold). Portugal were a distant third with two gold medals and twelve medals altogether.

Robson da Silva retained his 100 and 200 metres titles and won a third gold for Brazil in the relay. Antonio Peñalver (an Olympic medallist two years later) won the first decathlon to be held at the championships, while Orlane dos Santos won the inaugural women's heptathlon competition.

== Medal summary ==
=== Men ===
Event	Gold		Silver		Bronze	
100 metres	Robson da Silva (BRA)	10.12	Fernando Botasso (BRA)	10.34	Enrique Talavera (ESP)	10.45
200 metres	Robson da Silva (BRA)	20.43	Marcelo Brivilatti (BRA)	21.43	Luís Cunha (POR)	21.45
400 metres	Inaldo Sena (BRA)	46.54	Cristián Courbis (CHI)	47.07	Roberto Bortolotto (BRA)	47.33
800 metres	José Luíz Barbosa (BRA)	1:46.18 CR	Luis Migueles (ARG)	1:46.97	Luis Javier González (ESP)	1:47.66
1500 metres	Víctor Rojas (ESP)	3:42.86 CR	Ángel Fariña (ESP)	3:42.93	José Valente (BRA)	3:43.17
5000 metres	Antonio Serrano (ESP)	13:56.37	José Carlos Adán (ESP)	13:56.69	Antonio Silio (ARG)	13:59.18
10,000 metres	Antonio Silio (ARG)	29:27.61	Juan Carlos Paúl (ESP)	29:46.80	Carlos de la Torre (ESP)	29:49.19
110 m hurdles (Wind: 2.5 m/s)	Carlos Sala (ESP)	13.97	Joilto Bonfim (BRA)	14.04	Lyndon Campos (BRA)	14.61
400 m hurdles	Eronilde de Araújo (BRA)	49.82	Hélio de Oliveira (BRA)	50.69	Pedro Rodrigues (POR)	50.96
3000 m steeplechase	Benito Nogales (ESP)	8:38.95	Ricardo Vera (URU)	8:39.86	José Carlos Pereira (POR)	8:43.85
4×100 m relay	Brazil (BRA); Antonio dos Santos Filho; Marcelo Brivilati da Silva; Fernando Botasso; Robson da Silva	40.37	Spain (ESP); Luis Turón; Florencio Gascón; Carlos Sala; Enrique Talavera	40.49	Portugal (POR); Luis Barroso; Fernando Damasio; Pedro Curvelo; Luís Cunha	40.82
4×400 m relay	Brazil (BRA); Inaldo Sena; Helio Gonçalves; Geraldo Maranhão Jr. Eronilde de Araújo	3:09.2	Spain (ESP); Sergio López; José Alonso; Miguel Cuesta; Manuel Moreno	3:10.9	Only two teams competed	
Marathon	Cancelled due to heat					
20 km track walk	Carlos Mercenario (MEX)	1:25:29.5	Valentí Massana (ESP)	1:25:37.8	Cláudio Bertolino (BRA)	1:32:11.9
High jump	Arturo Ortiz (ESP)	2.21 m	Luciano Bacelli (BRA)	2.15 m	Gustavo Becker (ESP)	2.15 m
Pole vault	Ignacio Paradinas (ESP)	5.15 m	José Luis Canelas (ESP)	5.00 m	Guillermo Salgado (MEX)	5.00 m
Long jump	Paulo de Oliveira (BRA)	7.82 m (w)	Ángel Hernández (ESP)	7.75 m	Darío Ruiz (MEX)	7.68 m
Triple jump	Anísio Silva (BRA)	16.71 m	Francisco dos Santos (BRA)	16.11 m	Ricardo Valiente (PER)	15.78 m
Shot put	Gert Weil (CHI)	19.58 m	Adilson Oliveira (BRA)	17.34 m	Édson Miguel (BRA)	17.16 m
Discus throw	David Martínez (ESP)	59.30 m	João dos Santos (BRA)	58.14 m	Ramón Jiménez Gaona (PAR)	56.38 m
Hammer throw	Andrés Charadía (ARG)	68.98 m	Alex Marfull (ESP)	65.36 m	Antón María Godall (ESP)	64.94 m
Javelin throw	Luis Lucumí (COL)	72.74 m	Julián Sotelo (ESP)	68.10 m	Rodrigo Zelaya (CHI)	67.28 m
Decathlon	Antonio Peñalver (ESP)	7824 pts CR	José de Assis (BRA)	7480 pts	Álvaro Burrell (ESP)	7176 pts

=== Women ===
Event	Gold		Silver		Bronze	
100 metres	Sandra Myers (ESP)	11.50	Cleide Amaral (BRA)	11.61	Rita Araújo (BRA)	11.73
200 metres	Cristina Castro (ESP)	23.63	Lucrécia Jardim (POR)	23.82	Olga Conte (ARG)	23.96
400 metres	Maria Magnólia Figueiredo (BRA)	51.51	Blanca Lacambra (ESP)	53.40	Olga Conte (ARG)	53.85
800 metres	Mayte Zúñiga (ESP)	2:02.22	Alejandra Ramos (CHI)	2:02.37	Elsa Amaral (POR)	2:03.57
1500 metres	Alejandra Ramos (CHI)	4:13.07	Estela Estévez (ESP)	4:13.96	Carla Sacramento (POR)	4:15.06
3000 metres	Silvana Pereira (BRA)	9:10.17 CR	Julia Vaquero (ESP)	9:12.87	Fernanda Ribeiro (POR)	9:19.44
10,000 metres	Carmen Brunet (ESP)	34:41.95 CR	Silvana Pereira (BRA)	35:04.18	Marineide dos Santos (BRA)	35:13.69
100 m hurdles	María José Mardomingo (ESP)	13.59	Carmen Bezanilla (CHI)	13.80	Ana Barrenechea (ESP)	14.01
400 m hurdles	Liliana Chalá (ECU)	58.31	Miriam Alonso (ESP)	59.20	Yolanda Tello (ESP)	59.43
4×100 m relay	Brazil (BRA); Vânia Amorim dos Santos; Claudiléia Matos Santos; Rita de Cássia Araújo Gomes; Cleide Amaral	44.60	Spain (ESP); Blanca Lacambra; Cristina Castro; Carmen García-Campero; Sandra Myers	45.60	Uruguay (URU); Soleded Acerenza; Margarita Martirena; María del Carmen Mosegui; Claudia Acerenza	47.10
4×400 m relay	Brazil (BRA); Maria Magnólia Figueiredo; Eliane Souza Silva; Rosângela Oliveira de Souza; Soraya Vieira Telles	3:32.8	Spain (ESP); Blanca Lacambra; Esther Lahoz; Gemma Bergasa; Sandra Myers	3:35.2	Uruguay (URU); Soleded Acerenza; Margarita Martirena; Claudia Acerenza; María del Carmen Mosegui	3:43.6
Marathon	Cancelled due to heat					
10 km track walk	María Reyes Sobrino (ESP)	46:36.40	Emilia Cano (ESP)	48:14.63	Elsa Abril (COL)	52:07.00
High jump	Orlane dos Santos (BRA)	1.81 m	Mônica Lunkmoss (BRA)	1.78 m	Belén Sáenz (ESP)	1.78 m
Long jump	Ana Oliveira (POR)	6.27 m	Andrea Ávila (ARG)	6.16 m	Emília Tavares (POR)	6.08 m
Shot put	Elisângela Adriano (BRA)	16.65 m	Margarita Ramos (ESP)	16.26 m	Teresa Machado (POR)	15.87 m
Discus throw	Teresa Machado (POR)	53.92 m	Ángeles Barreiro (ESP)	51.78 m	Margarita Ramos (ESP)	49.74 m
Javelin throw	Mônica Rocha (BRA)	50.40 m	Zorobabelia Córdoba (COL)	44.10 m	Ana Lúcia Silva (BRA)	32.08 m
Heptathlon	Orlane dos Santos (BRA)	5723 pts CR	Ana María Comaschi (ARG)	5517 pts	Zorobabelia Córdoba (COL)	5091 pts

== Medal table ==
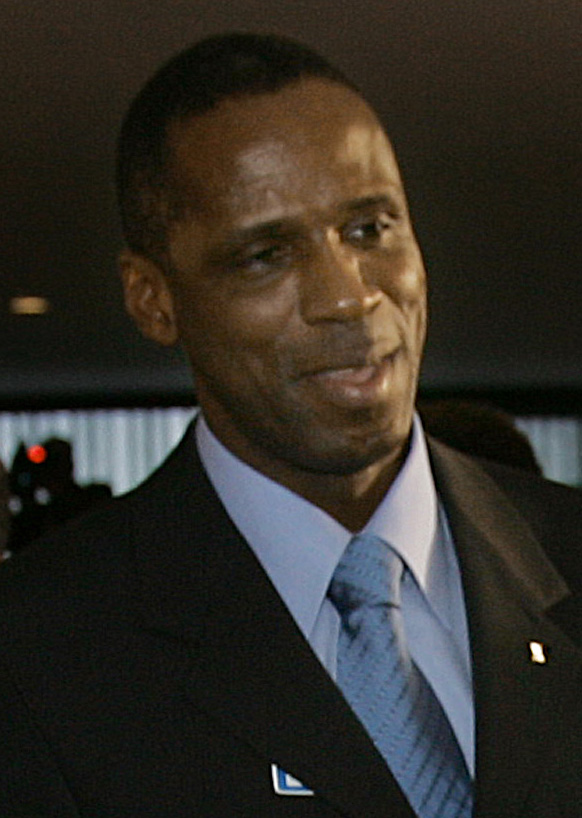
Robson da Silva won three sprint golds for Brazil.

* Host nation (Brazil)

Rank	Nation	Gold	Silver	Bronze	Total
1	Brazil*	17	12	8	37
2	Spain	14	19	10	43
3	Argentina	2	3	3	8
4	Chile	2	3	1	6
5	Portugal	2	1	9	12
6	Colombia	1	1	2	4
7	Mexico	1	0	2	3
8	Ecuador	1	0	0	1
9	Uruguay	0	1	2	3
10	Paraguay	0	0	1	1
10	Peru	0	0	1	1
Totals (11 entries)		40	40	39	119

== Participation ==
Of the twenty-two members of the Asociación Iberoamericana de Atletismo, fourteen were present at the fourth edition – a record low for the championships. A total 205 athletes competed. 214 participating athletes (including a couple of guest athletes) were counted by analysing the official result list.

- Argentina (20)
- Bolivia (1)
- Brazil (66)
- Chile (9)
- Colombia (8)
- Ecuador (7)
- Mexico (8)
- Panama (1)
- Paraguay (3)
- Peru (8)
- Portugal (20)
- Spain (56)
- Uruguay (5)
- Venezuela (2)
