= Acerenza (surname) =

Acerenza (pronounced [atʃeˈrɛntsa]) is an Italian surname from Basilicata and Apulia, derived from the Lucanian town of Acerenza. Notable people with the surname include:

- Claudia Acerenza (born 1966), Uruguayan sprinter
- Domenico Acerenza (born 1995), Italian swimmer
