= José Quiñaliza =

Ecuadorian triple jumper (born 1961)

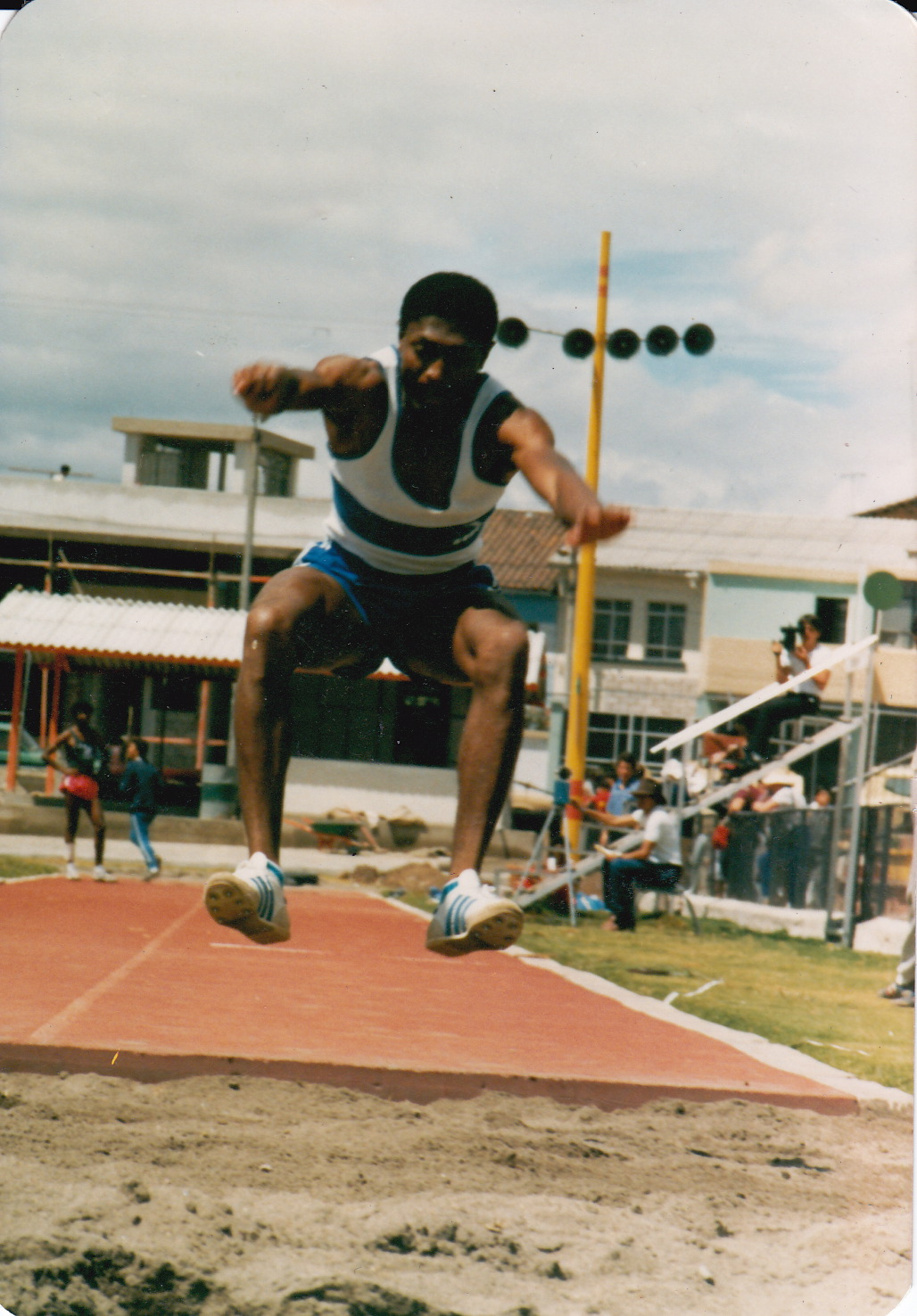
- Quiñaliza in 1983 at the national championships

Personal information
- Born: July 21, 1961 (age 64)
- Height: 1.79 m (5 ft 10 in)
- Weight: 75 kg (165 lb)

Sport
- Country: Ecuador
- Sport: Men's athletics

Achievements and titles
- Olympic finals: 1988 Summer Olympics
Medal record
athletics
Representing Ecuador
South American Games
Gold medal – first place	1986 Santiago	Triple jump
Bolivarian Games
Silver medal – second place	1989 Maracaibo	Triple jump

José Quiñaliza (born July 21, 1961) is a male track and field athlete from Ecuador, who competed in the triple jump event during his career.

== International competitions ==
Year	Competition	Venue	Position	Event	Notes
Representing Ecuador
1983	South American Championships	Santa Fe, Argentina	2nd	Triple Jump	15.52 m
1986	Ibero-American Championships	La Habana, Cuba	4th	Triple jump	15.36 m
1986	South American Games	Santiago, Chile	1st	Triple jump	15.40 m
1987	Pan American Games	Indianapolis, United States	9th	Triple Jump	15.62 m
1987	South American Championships	São Paulo, Brazil	6th	4 × 400 m relay	3:18.81
1987	South American Championships	São Paulo, Brazil	3rd	Triple Jump	15.77 m
1988	Olympic Games	Seoul, South Korea	25th (q)	Triple Jump	15.86 m
1989	Bolivarian Games	Maracaibo, Venezuela	2nd	Triple jump	15.92 m
1989	South American Championships	Medellín, Colombia	5th	Long jump	6.77 m
1989	South American Championships	Medellín, Colombia	4th	Triple jump	16.35 m
