= Álvaro Prenafeta =

Personal information
- Full name: Álvaro José Prenafeta Novella
- Born: 8 April 1963 (age 63)

Sport
- Sport: Athletics
- Events: 100 metres, 200 metres
Medal record
Representing Chile
South American Games
Gold medal – first place	1986 Santiago	200m
Gold medal – first place	1986 Santiago	4x400m relay
Silver medal – second place	1986 Santiago	4x100m relay
Bronze medal – third place	1986 Santiago	100m

Álvaro José Prenafeta Novella (born 8 April 1963) is a retired Chilean sprinter. He won several medals at regional level.

== International competitions ==
Year	Competition	Venue	Position	Event	Notes
Representing Chile
1985	South American Championships	Santiago, Chile	6th	100 m	10.92
1985	South American Championships	Santiago, Chile	4th	200 m	21.49
1985	South American Championships	Santiago, Chile	3rd	4 × 100 m relay	40.69
1986	South American Games	Santiago, Chile	3rd	100 m	10.77
1986	South American Games	Santiago, Chile	1st	200 m	21.29
1986	South American Games	Santiago, Chile	2nd	4 × 100 m relay	40.83
1986	South American Games	Santiago, Chile	1st	4 × 400 m relay	3:08.37
1987	Universiade	Zagreb, Yugoslavia	37th (h)	100 m	11.06
1987	Universiade	Zagreb, Yugoslavia	17th (qf)	200 m	21.52
1987	Universiade	Zagreb, Yugoslavia	6th	4 × 400 m relay	3:10.76
1987	South American Championships	São Paulo, Brazil	3rd	200 m	21.48
1987	South American Championships	São Paulo, Brazil	3rd	4 × 100 m relay	40.75
1993	South American Championships	Lima, Peru	1st	4 × 100 m relay	40.2
1993	South American Championships	Lima, Peru	1st	4 × 400 m relay	3:09.5
