= Athletics at the 1995 Pan American Games – Women's 400 metres hurdles =

Women's 400 metres hurdles at the Pan American Games

The women's 400 metres hurdles event at the 1995 Pan American Games was held at the Estadio Atletico "Justo Roman" on 24 March.

== Results ==
Rank	Name	Nationality	Time	Notes
1st place, gold medalist(s)	Kim Batten	United States	54.74	
2nd place, silver medalist(s)	Tonja Buford	United States	55.05	
3rd place, bronze medalist(s)	Lency Montelier	Cuba	55.74	
4	Donalda Duprey	Canada	57.26	
5	Carmen Bezanilla	Chile	59.46	NR
6	Sandra Izquierdo	Argentina	1:00.27	
7	Gabriela Fornaciari	Argentina	1:00.56	
	Ana Traña	Nicaragua	DNF	
