= Angélica de Almeida =

Brazilian long-distance runner

Angélica de Almeida (born March 25, 1965) is a retired marathon runner from Brazil, who won the 1986 edition of the Buenos Aires Marathon. She represented her native country in the women's marathon at the 1988 Summer Olympics in Seoul, South Korea, finishing in 44th place.

== Achievements ==
Year	Competition	Venue	Position	Event	Notes
Representing Brazil
1986	Buenos Aires Marathon	Buenos Aires, Argentina	1st	Marathon	2:54:47
1987	World Championships	Rome, Italy	—	Marathon	DNF
1987	South American Championships	São Paulo, Brazil	1st	10,000 m	34:59.2
1988	Olympic Games	Seoul, South Korea	44th	Marathon	2:43:40
