= Carmen Bezanilla =

Chilean athlete

Personal information
- Full name: Carmen Gloria Bezanilla Collell
- Born: 8 October 1967 (age 58)

Sport
- Sport: Athletics
- Event: 100 metres hurdles
Medal record
Representing Chile
South American Games
Gold medal – first place	1990 Lima	100m hurdles
Silver medal – second place	1986 Santiago	100m hurdles
Bronze medal – third place	1990 Lima	400m hurdles

Carmen Gloria Bezanilla Collell (born 8 October 1967) is a retired Chilean athlete who specialised in the 100 metres hurdles. She represented her country at the 1991 World Championships without advancing from the first round.

== International competitions ==
Year	Competition	Venue	Position	Event	Notes
Representing Chile
1984	South American Junior Championships	Caracas, Venezuela	2nd	100 m hurdles	14.47
1984	South American Junior Championships	Caracas, Venezuela	1st	200 m hurdles	28.43 (w)
1984	South American Junior Championships	Caracas, Venezuela	2nd	4 × 100 m relay	47.24
1984	South American Junior Championships	Caracas, Venezuela	6th	High jump	1.52 m
1985	South American Junior Championships	Santa Fe, Argentina	3rd	100 m hurdles	15.02
1985	South American Junior Championships	Santa Fe, Argentina	1st	200 m hurdles	28.42
1985	South American Junior Championships	Santa Fe, Argentina	2nd	4 × 100 m relay	48.29
1985	South American Junior Championships	Santa Fe, Argentina	6th	High jump	1.60 m
1986	South American Games	Santiago, Chile	2nd	100 m hurdles	14.54
1987	Pan American Games	Indianapolis, United States	10th (h)	100 m hurdles	14.17
1987	Pan American Games	Indianapolis, United States	6th	Heptathlon	5237 pts
1987	South American Championships	São Paulo, Brazil	1st	100 m hurdles	14.22
1987	South American Championships	São Paulo, Brazil	3rd	4 × 400 m relay	3:43.61
1987	South American Championships	São Paulo, Brazil	4th	High jump	1.70 m
1987	South American Championships	São Paulo, Brazil	2nd	Heptathlon	5066 pts
1988	Ibero-American Championships	Mexico City, Mexico	4th	100 m hurdles	13.78
1989	South American Championships	Medellín, Colombia	4th	100 m hurdles	13.9
1989	South American Championships	Medellín, Colombia	4th	4 × 100 m relay	47.20
1989	South American Championships	Medellín, Colombia	4th	4 × 400 m relay	3:46.0
1990	Ibero-American Championships	Manaus, Brazil	2nd	100 m hurdles	13.80
1990	Ibero-American Championships	Manaus, Brazil	5th	400 m hurdles	60.13
1990	South American Games	Lima, Peru	1st	100 m hurdles	13.96
1990	South American Games	Lima, Peru	3rd	400 m hurdles	61.2
1991	South American Championships	Manaus, Brazil	1st	400 m hurdles	13.73
1991	South American Championships	Manaus, Brazil	4th	4 × 100 m relay	46.54
1991	South American Championships	Manaus, Brazil	4th	4 × 400 m relay	3:40.43
1991	Pan American Games	Havana, Cuba	6th	100 m hurdles	13.90
1991	World Championships	Tokyo, Japan	32nd (h)	100 m hurdles	14.01
1992	Ibero-American Championships	Seville, Spain	5th	400 m hurdles	59.67
1992	Ibero-American Championships	Seville, Spain	3rd	4 × 100 m relay	45.54
1994	Ibero-American Championships	Mar del Plata, Argentina	3rd	100 m hurdles	14.01 (w)
1994	Ibero-American Championships	Mar del Plata, Argentina	3rd	4 × 100 m relay	46.22
1994	Ibero-American Championships	Mar del Plata, Argentina	3rd	4 × 400 m relay	3:41.40
1995	Pan American Games	Havana, Cuba	5th	100 m hurdles	13.45 (w)
1995	Pan American Games	Havana, Cuba	5th	400 m hurdles	59.46
1995	Pan American Games	Havana, Cuba	6th	4 × 100 m relay	46.31
1995	South American Championships	Manaus, Brazil	1st	100 m hurdles	13.62
1995	South American Championships	Manaus, Brazil	3rd	4 × 100 m relay	46.73
1995	South American Championships	Manaus, Brazil	2nd	4 × 400 m relay	3:42.27
1995	Pacific Ocean Games	Cali, Colombia	3rd	100 m hurdles	13.67
1995	Universiade	Fukuoka, Japan	17th (h)	100 m hurdles	13.88
1996	Ibero-American Championships	Medellín, Colombia	5th	100 m hurdles	13.87 (w)

== Personal bests ==
Outdoor

- 100 metres hurdles – 13.55 (Alcalá de Henares 2001)
- 400 metres hurdles – 59.46 (Mar Del Plata 1995) former NR
