= Tómas Riether =

Chilean pole vaulter

Personal information
- Full name: Tómas José Riether Scholtesen
- Nickname: Tom
- Nationality: Chilean
- Born: 10 April 1964 (age 62)
- Education: Florida State University
- Height: 1.81 m (5 ft 11 in)
- Weight: 61 kg (134 lb)

Sport
- Sport: Athletics
- Event: Pole vault
- College team: Florida State Seminoles

Tómas José Riether Scholtesen (born 10 April 1964) is a Chilean athlete. He competed in the men's pole vault at the 1992 Summer Olympics.

His personal best in the event is 5.50 metres set in Tallahassee in 1992. This is a standing national record.

== International competitions ==
Year	Competition	Venue	Position	Event	Notes
Representing Chile
1985	South American Championships	Santiago, Chile	8th	Decathlon	5746 pts
1987	South American Championships	São Paulo, Brazil	2nd	Pole vault	5.15 m
1991	South American Championships	Manaus, Brazil	3rd	Pole vault	4.80 m
1992	Ibero-American Championships	Seville, Spain	4th	Pole vault	5.10 m
1992	Olympic Games	Barcelona, Spain	–	Pole vault	NM
