= 1987 South American Championships in Athletics =

- Dates: 8–11 October
- Host city: São Paulo, Brazil
- Venue: Estádio Ícaro de Castro Melo
- Events: 40
- Participation: 207 athletes from 10 nations

The 1987 South American Championships in Athletics were held in São Paulo, Brazil, between 8 and 11 October.

== Medal summary ==
=== Men's events ===
Event	Gold		Silver		Bronze	
100 metres (wind: 0.0 m/s)	Robson da Silva; Brazil	10.39	Carlos Moreno; Chile	10.51	Carlos de Oliveira; Brazil	10.68
200 metres (wind: -0.6 m/s)	Robson da Silva; Brazil	21.04	Carlos Moreno; Chile	21.41	Álvaro Prenafeta; Chile	21.48
400 metres	Héctor Daley; Panama	45.80 CR	Gérson de Souza; Brazil	46.26	Cristián Courbis; Chile	46.37
800 metres	Luis Migueles; Argentina	1:47.35	Pablo Squella; Chile	1:48.64	Jamir Garcez; Brazil	1:49.49
1500 metres	Gilson Wiggers; Brazil	3:46.62	Emilio Ulloa; Chile	3:46.69	Manuel Balmaceda; Chile	3:47.43
5000 metres	Rolando Vera; Ecuador	14:03.00	Florinda Corrêa; Brazil	14:04.60	Omar Aguilar; Chile	14:05.50
10,000 metres	Juan Pablo Juárez; Argentina	29:18.39	Rolando Vera; Ecuador	29:19.16	Omar Aguilar; Chile	29:30.01
Marathon	Osmiro Silva; Brazil	2:21:06	José César de Souza; Brazil	2:24:49	Wilson Pérez; Ecuador	2:26:22
110 metres hurdles (wind: -0.8 m/s)	Lyndon Campos; Brazil	14.13	Joilto Bonfim; Brazil	14.54	Carlos Varas; Argentina	14.55
400 metres hurdles	Pablo Squella; Chile	50.42	Antônio Dias Ferreira; Brazil	50.67	Carlos dos Santos; Brazil	52.43
3000 metres steeplechase	Emilio Ulloa; Chile	8:51.41	Carlos Naput; Argentina	8:53.84	Ricardo Vera; Uruguay	8:58.99
4 × 100 metres relay	Brazil; Carlos de Oliveira; Pedro Miguel da Silva; Reginaldo Aguiar; Robson da Silva	40.17	Argentina; Oscar Barrionuevo; Carlos Gats; José María Beduino; Gerardo Meinardi	40.72	Chile; Carlos Moreno; Álvaro Prenafeta; Juan Carlos Fuentes; Héctor Fernández	40.75
4 × 400 metres relay	Chile; Cristián Courbis; Manuel Balmaceda; Pablo Squella; Carlos Morales	3:07.64 CR	Brazil; Gérson de Souza; Paulo César de Souza; Geraldo de Assis; Nilson Neri	3:08.43	Argentina; Fabián Garbolino; Dardo Angerami; Luis Migueles; José María Beduino	3:10.36
20 kilometres road walk	Cláudio Bertolino; Brazil	1:38:34	Jorge Yannone; Argentina	1:39:12	Juan Canevaro; Chile	1:40:51
High jump	Fernando Moreno; Argentina	2.17 =CR	Fernando Pastoriza; Argentina	2.17	Milton Riitano Francisco; Brazil	2.14
Pole vault	Oscar Veit; Argentina	5.25 CR	Thomas Riether; Chile	5.15	Renato Bortolocci; Brazil	5.05
Long jump	Paulo de Oliveira; Brazil	7.65	Fernando Valiente; Peru	7.56	Ricardo Valiente; Peru	7.45
Triple jump	Jorge da Silva; Brazil	16.24	Abcelvio Rodrigues; Brazil	16.11	José Quiñaliza; Ecuador	15.77
Shot put	Gert Weil; Chile	19.35	Adilson Oliveira; Brazil	18.04	Gerardo Carucci; Argentina	16.70
Discus throw	Carlos Brynner; Argentina	55.34 CR	José Jacques; Brazil	54.46	João dos Santos; Brazil	51.16
Hammer throw	Andrés Charadia; Argentina	66.72 CR	Pedro Rivail Atílio; Brazil	62.68	Adrián Marzo; Argentina	59.94
Javelin throw (Current design)	Nivaldo Beje Filho; Brazil	64.46 CR	Rodrigo Zelaya; Chile	64.06	Jorge Parraguirre; Chile	63.98
Decathlon	Paulo Lima; Brazil	7491	Fidel Solórzano; Ecuador	6947	Carlos Martín; Argentina	6924

=== Women's events ===
Event	Gold		Silver		Bronze	
100 metres (wind: 0.0 m/s)	Deborah Bell; Argentina	11.68	Ximena Restrepo; Colombia	11.77	Inês Ribeiro; Brazil	11.91
200 metres (wind: 0.0 m/s)	Ximena Restrepo; Colombia	23.49	Liliana Chalá; Ecuador	23.74	Deborah Bell; Argentina	23.87
400 metres	Liliana Chalá; Ecuador	52.9 CR	Suzete Montalvão; Brazil	53.7	Soledad Acerenza; Uruguay	55.2
800 metres	Soraya Telles; Brazil	2:07.71	Graciela Mardones; Chile	2:09.21	Luiza do Nascimento; Brazil	2:09.39
1500 metres	Soraya Telles; Brazil	4:29.9	Rita de Jesus; Brazil	4:30.9	Graciela Mardones; Chile	4:33.9
3000 metres	Monica Regonesi; Chile	9:47.30	Martha Tenorio; Ecuador	10:02.63	María Martínez; Argentina	10:05.93
10,000 metres	Angélica de Almeida; Brazil	34:59.2	Monica Regonesi; Chile	35:00.6	Martha Tenorio; Ecuador	35:11.5
100 metres hurdles (wind: -0.3 m/s)	Carmen Bezanilla; Chile	14.22	Carolina Gutiérrez; Argentina	14.34	Alejandra Martínez; Chile	14.49
400 metres hurdles	Liliana Chalá; Ecuador	58.46 CR	Maria do Carmo Fialho; Brazil	59.92	Margit Weise; Brazil	60.05
4 × 100 metres relay	Argentina; Milagros Allende; Olga Conte; Laura de Falco; Deborah Bell	45.45	Brazil; Iara Ribeiro; Jupira da Graça; Roberta Correa; Inês Ribeiro	45.78	Uruguay; Rosanna Biasco; Margarita Martirena; Soledad Acerenza; Claudia Acerenza	46.54
4 × 400 metres relay	Brazil; Suzete Montalvão; Soraya Telles; Maria do Carmo Fialho; Eliane Silva	3:38.13 CR	Argentina; Viviana Cortes; Olga Conte; Milagros Allende; Laura de Falco	3:43.56	Chile; Carmen Bezanilla; Claudia Hoelzel; Graciela Mardones; Ismenia Guzmán	3:43.61
High jump	Orlane dos Santos; Brazil	1.80	Liliana Lohmann; Brazil	1.73	Carmen Garib; Chile	1.70
Long jump	Rita Slompo; Brazil	6.17	Ana Martina Vizioli; Argentina	6.01	Orlane dos Santos; Brazil	5.90
Shot put	Maria Fernandes; Brazil	14.49	Berenice da Silva; Uruguay	14.36	Eliane de Campos; Brazil	13.88
Discus throw	Luz María Quiñonez; Ecuador	48.00	Márcia Barbosa; Brazil	45.66	Gloria Martínez; Chile	44.66
Javelin throw	Sueli dos Santos; Brazil	56.00 CR	Berta Gómez; Colombia	47.62	Sonia Favre; Argentina	46.68
Heptathlon	Conceição Geremias; Brazil	5550	Carmen Bezanilla; Chile	5066	Carolina Gutiérrez; Argentina	4765

== Medal table ==
Rank	Nation	Gold	Silver	Bronze	Total
1	Brazil (BRA)	20	16	11	47
2	Argentina (ARG)	8	7	9	24
3	Chile (CHI)	6	9	13	28
4	Ecuador (ECU)	4	4	3	11
5	Colombia (COL)	1	2	0	3
6	Panama (PAN)	1	0	0	1
7	Uruguay (URU)	0	1	3	4
8	Peru (PER)	0	1	1	2
Totals (8 entries)		40	40	40	120

== Participating nations ==
- Argentina (45)
- Bolivia (4)
- Brazil (64)
- Chile (32)
- Colombia (2)
- Ecuador (21)
- Panama (1)
- Paraguay (9)
- Peru (10)
- Uruguay (19)
