= Fidel Solórzano =

Ecuadorian athlete

Personal information
- Born: May 26, 1962 (age 64)

Sport
- Country: Ecuador
- Sport: Men's Athletics

Achievements and titles
- Olympic finals: 1984 Summer Olympics; 1988 Summer Olympics
Medal record
Athletics
Representing Ecuador
South American Games
Silver medal – second place	1986 Santiago	Decathlon
Bronze medal – third place	1986 Santiago	Long jump
Bolivarian Games
Gold medal – first place	1989 Maracaibo	Decathlon

Fidel Solórzano (born May 26, 1962) is a retired athlete from Ecuador, who competed in the long jump event and the decathlon during his career.

== Career ==
He represented his native country twice at the Summer Olympics, in the 1984 and 1988 Games.

== Achievements ==
Year	Competition	Venue	Position	Event	Notes
Representing Ecuador
1983	Pan American Games	Caracas, Venezuela	9th	Long jump	6.66 m
1983	South American Championships	Santa Fe, Argentina	8th	Long jump	6.71 m
1984	Olympic Games	Los Angeles, United States	24th (q)	Long jump	6.93 m
1984	Olympic Games	Los Angeles, United States	23rd	Decathlon	6519 pts
1986	South American Games	Santiago, Chile	3rd	Long jump	7.37 m
1986	South American Games	Santiago, Chile	2nd	Decathlon	6665 pts
1987	Pan American Games	Indianapolis, United States	–	Decathlon	DNF
1987	South American Championships	São Paulo, Brazil	7th	4 × 100 m relay	43.36 s
1987	South American Championships	São Paulo, Brazil	5th	Long jump	7.11 m
1987	South American Championships	São Paulo, Brazil	2nd	Decathlon	6947 pts
1988	Olympic Games	Seoul, South Korea	–	Decathlon	DNF
1989	Bolivarian Games	Maracaibo, Venezuela	1st	Decathlon	6637 pts
