= Athletics at the 1986 South American Games =

Athletics at the III South American Games
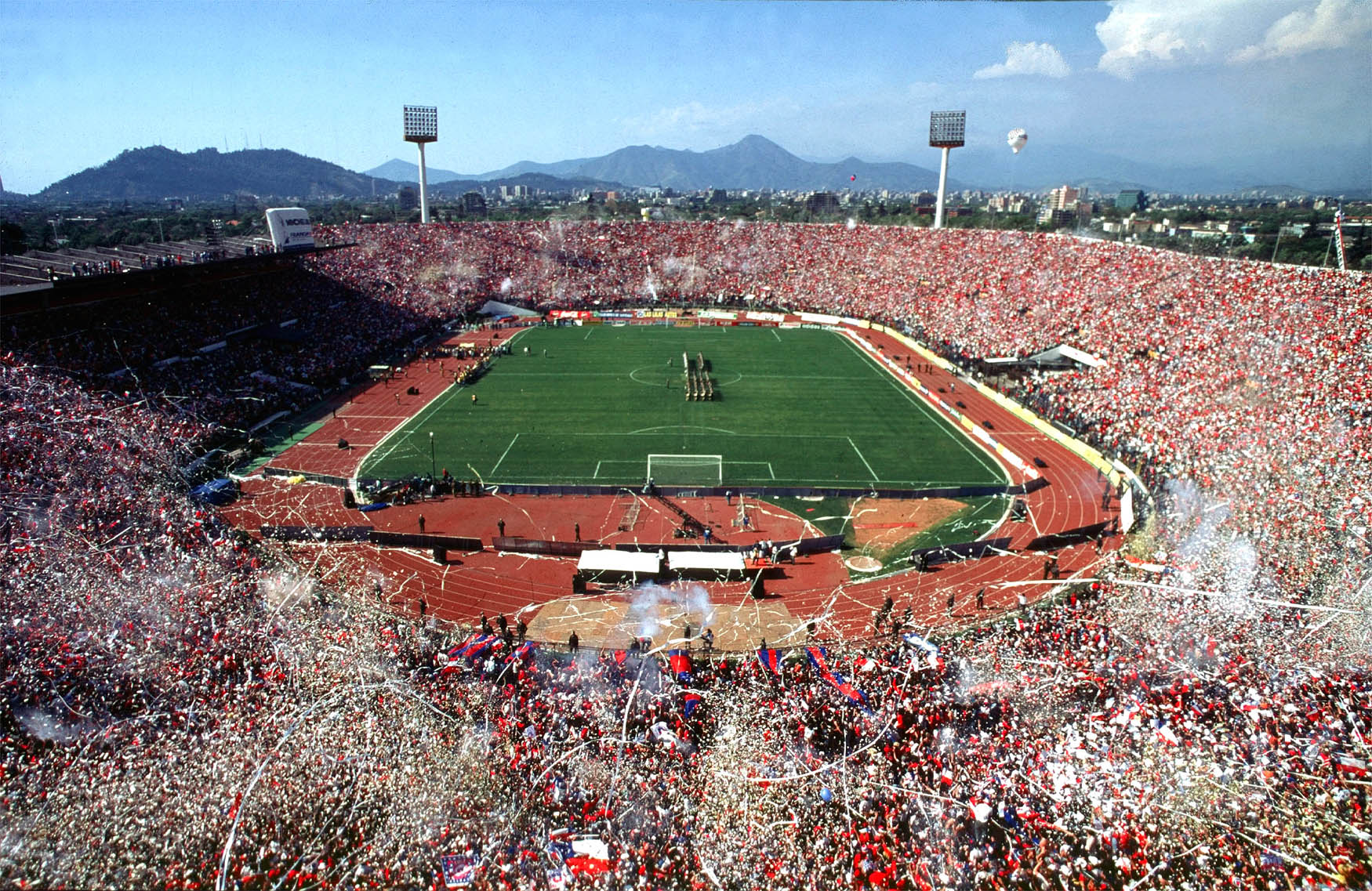
- National Stadium in Santiago, Chile
- Dates: 3–6 December
- Host city: Santiago, Chile
- Venue: Estadio Nacional
- Level: Senior
- Events: 40 (23 men, 17 women)

Athletics events at the 1986 South American Games were held at the Estadio Nacional in Santiago, Chile. A total of 40 events were contested, 23 by men and 17 by women.

== Medal summary ==
Medal winners were published in a book by written Argentinian journalist Ernesto Rodríguez III with support of the Argentine Olympic Committee (Spanish: Comité Olímpico Argentino) under the auspices of the Ministry of Education (Spanish: Ministerio de Educación de la Nación) in collaboration with the Office of Sports (Spanish: Secretaría de Deporte de la Nación). Eduardo Biscayart supplied the list of winners and their results.

=== Men ===
Event	Gold		Silver		Bronze	
100 metres	Gerardo Meinardi; Argentina	10.65	Oscar Barrionuevo; Argentina	10.75	Álvaro Prenafeta; Chile	10.77
200 metres	Álvaro Prenafeta; Chile	21.29	Marco Mautino; Peru	21.43	Gerardo Meinardi; Argentina	21.45
400 metres	Carlos Morales; Chile	47.01	Alejandro Krauss; Chile	47.61	Moisés Del Castillo; Peru	48.07
800 metres	Manuel Balmaceda; Chile	1:47.98	Luis Migueles; Argentina	1:48.00	Rodrigo Muñoz; Chile	1:51.21
1500 metres	Emilio Ulloa; Chile	3:44.21	Marcelo Cascabello; Argentina	3:45.61	Rodrigo Muñoz; Chile	3:53.06
5000 metres	Omar Aguilar; Chile	14:05.56	Rolando Vera; Ecuador	14:09.21	Antonio Silio; Argentina	14:23.43
10,000 metres	Rolando Vera; Ecuador	28:53.90	Omar Aguilar; Chile	29:20.92	Jorge Rojas; Chile	29:56.00
Marathon	Sergio Magne; Chile	2:26:08	Policarpo Calizaya; Bolivia	2:27:44	Rolando Acuña; Chile	2:27:53
110 metres hurdles	Carlos Varas; Argentina	14.51	George Biehl; Chile	14.62	Fernando Valiente; Peru	15.10
400 metres hurdles	Pablo Squella; Chile	52.01	Alberto Izu; Peru	52.54	Dardo Angerami; Argentina	52.89
3000 metres steeplechase	Emilio Ulloa; Chile	8:38.49	Marcelo Cascabello; Argentina	8:44.15	Rudimir Ojeda; Chile	9:02.62
4 × 100 metres relay	Peru; Moisés Del Castillo; Marco Mautino; Giorgio Mautino; Óscar Fernández	40.75	Chile ? ? Luis Schneider; Álvaro Prenafeta	40.83	Ecuador ? ? Gerardo Reyes; Fernando Espinosa	41.72
4 × 400 metres relay	Chile; Alejandro Krauss; Álvaro Prenafeta; Carlos Morales; Pablo Squella; Chile	3:08.37	Argentina; Oscar Barrionuevo; Dardo Angerami; Gerardo Meinardi; José María Beduino	3:12.95	Peru; Ramiro Quintana; Alberto Izu; Marco Mautino; Moisés Del Castillo	3:15.05
20 Kilometres Walk	Senón Quispe; Bolivia		Eloy Quispe; Bolivia		Juan Canevaro; Chile	
High jump	Fernando Pastoriza; Argentina	2.15	Francisco Muñoz; Chile	2.12	Santiago Lozada; Peru	2.06
Pole vault	Oscar Veit; Argentina	5.01	Jaime Silva; Chile	4.60	Daniel Prieto; Chile	4.50
Long jump	Fernando Valiente; Peru	7.48	Osvaldo Frigerio; Argentina	7.47	Fidel Solórzano; Ecuador	7.37
Triple jump	José Quiñaliza; Ecuador	15.40	Francisco Pichot; Chile	15.35	Ricardo Valiente; Peru	14.87
Shot put	José Jara; Chile	15.95	Gerardo Carucci; Argentina	15.74	Carlos Bryner; Argentina	15.22
Discus throw	Carlos Bryner; Argentina	50.68	Gerardo Carucci; Argentina	46.58	Roberto Pesqueira; Chile	45.72
Hammer throw	Andrés Charadía; Argentina	62.72	Daniel Gómez; Argentina	59.62	Raúl Ramón; Ecuador	51.70
Javelin throw	Gustavo Wielandt; Chile	70.38	Marco Talavera; Paraguay	64.78	Jorge Parraguirre; Chile	64.38
Decathlon	Carlos Martín; Argentina	6759	Fidel Solórzano; Ecuador	6665	George Biehl; Chile	6653

=== Women ===
Event	Gold		Silver		Bronze	
100 metres	Patricia Pérez; Chile	11.90	Claudia Acerenza; Uruguay	11.99	Deborah Bell; Argentina	12.08
200 metres	Liliana Chalá; Ecuador	24.01	Claudia Acerenza; Uruguay	24.30	Soledad Acerenza; Uruguay	24.66
400 metres	Liliana Chalá; Ecuador	54.47	Graciela Mardones; Chile	55.44	María del Carmen Mosegui; Uruguay	55.85
800 metres	Graciela Mardones; Chile	2:07.11	Liliana Góngora; Argentina	2:08.89	Gina Toledo; Chile	2:10.94
1500 metres	Liliana Góngora; Argentina	4:25.87	Gina Toledo; Chile	4:28.94	Ruth Jaime; Peru	4:33.06
3000 metres	Mónica Regonesi; Chile	9:41.13	Ruth Jaime; Peru	9:46.02	María Teresa Paucar; Ecuador	9:57.87
10,000 metres	Mónica Regonesi; Chile	35:25.30	María Teresa Paucar; Ecuador	36:40.18	Ruth Jaime; Peru	38:12.67
100 metres hurdles	Alejandra Martínez; Chile	14.22	Carmen Bezanilla; Chile	14.54	Adriana Martínez; Ecuador	16.30
400 metres hurdles	Liliana Chalá; Ecuador	58.64	Claudia Oxman; Chile	61.43	Inés Justet; Uruguay	62.77
4 × 100 metres relay	Uruguay; Margarita Martirena; María del Carmen Mosegui; Soledad Acerenza; Claudia Acerenza	46.69 NR	Chile ? ? Michelle Camino; Patricia Pérez	46.76	Ecuador; Ilona Bohman; Valeria López; Adriana Martínez; Liliana Chalá	49.65
4 × 400 metres relay	Uruguay; Soledad Acerenza; Claudia Acerenza; Inés Justet; María del Carmen Mosegui	3:40.51	Chile; Claudia Riquelme; Ximena Monreal; Claudia Oxman; Graciela Mardones	3:41.18	Ecuador; Ilona Bohman; Valeria López; Adriana Martínez; Liliana Chalá	4:09.43
High jump	Leonor Carter; Chile	1.74	Carmen Garib; Chile	1.71	Ilona Bohman; Ecuador	1.68
Long jump	Graciela Acosta; Uruguay	5.78	Isabel Oliva; Chile	5.69	Claudia Herrera; Chile	5.15
Shot put	Berenice Da Silva; Uruguay	14.32	Claudia Brien; Chile	12.64	Mónica Fuentes; Chile	12.02
Discus throw	Berenice Da Silva; Uruguay	43.94	Elvira Yuera; Peru	43.82	Gloria Martínez; Chile	43.70
Javelin throw	Eugenia Urra; Chile	44.38	Verónica Silva; Chile	39.98	Ana María Comaschi; Argentina	33.52
Heptathlon	Ana María Comaschi; Argentina	4686	María Esther Mediano; Chile	4329	Claudia Brien; Chile	3895

== Medal table (unofficial) ==
* Host nation (Chile)

Rank	Nation	Gold	Silver	Bronze	Total
1	Chile (CHI)*	18	18	16	52
2	Argentina (ARG)	9	10	6	25
3	Ecuador (ECU)	5	3	8	16
4	Uruguay (URU)	5	2	3	10
5	Peru (PER)	2	4	7	13
6	Bolivia (BOL)	1	2	0	3
7	Paraguay (PAR)	0	1	0	1
Totals (7 entries)		40	40	40	120
