= Liliana Chalá =

Ecuadorian athlete

Personal information
- Full name: Elsa Liliana Chalá Mejía
- Born: June 7, 1965 (age 61)

Sport
- Country: Ecuador
- Sport: Women's Athletics
Medal record
Athletics
Representing Ecuador
South American Games
Gold medal – first place	1986 Santiago	200 m
Gold medal – first place	1986 Santiago	400 m
Gold medal – first place	1986 Santiago	400 m hurdles
Gold medal – first place	1990 Lima	400 m hurdles
Bronze medal – third place	1990 Lima	4x400 m relay
Bolivarian Games
Gold medal – first place	1993 Cochabamba	400 m hurdles

Elsa Liliana Chalá Mejía (born June 7, 1965) is an Ecuadorian retired track and field who competed in the 400 m hurdling and sprints events. She represented her native country twice at the Summer Olympics: 1988 and 1992.

She set a personal best of 23.74 seconds in the 200 Metres at an event in São Paulo on October 9, 1987.

== International competitions ==
Year	Competition	Venue	Position	Event	Notes
Representing Ecuador
1985	South American Championships	Santiago, Chile	5th	100 m	12.29
1985	South American Championships	Santiago, Chile	3rd	200 m	24.26
1985	South American Championships	Santiago, Chile	5th	4 × 100 m relay	47.23
1986	Ibero-American Championships	Havana, Cuba	3rd	200m	24.15 w (wind: +2.1 m/s)
1986	Ibero-American Championships	Havana, Cuba	4th	400m	54.79
1986	South American Games	Santiago, Chile	1st	200 m	24.01
1986	South American Games	Santiago, Chile	1st	400 m	54.47
1986	South American Games	Santiago, Chile	1st	400 m hurdles	58.64
1986	South American Games	Santiago, Chile	3rd	4 × 100 m relay	49.65
1986	South American Games	Santiago, Chile	3rd	4 × 400 m relay	4:09.43
1987	Pan American Games	Indianapolis, United States	5th	400 m hurdles	57.13
1987	Pan American Games	Indianapolis, United States	5th	4 × 400 m relay	3:49.74
1987	World Championships	Rome, Italy	23rd (h)	400 m hurdles	58.39
1987	South American Championships	São Paulo, Brazil	5th	100 m	11.97
1987	South American Championships	São Paulo, Brazil	2nd	200 m	23.74
1987	South American Championships	São Paulo, Brazil	1st	400 m	52.9 CR
1987	South American Championships	São Paulo, Brazil	1st	400 m hurdles	58.46 CR
1987	South American Championships	São Paulo, Brazil	4th	4 × 100 m relay	46.63
1987	South American Championships	São Paulo, Brazil	5th	4 × 400 m relay	3:49.64
1988	Ibero-American Championships	Mexico City, Mexico	4th (h)	200 m	25.2 (ht) (wind: +0.0 m/s) A
1988	Ibero-American Championships	Mexico City, Mexico	6th	400 m	54.49 A
1988	Ibero-American Championships	Mexico City, Mexico	2nd	400 m hurdles	57.12 A
1988	Olympic Games	Seoul, South Korea	29th (qf)	400 m	53.83
1988	Olympic Games	Seoul, South Korea	23rd (h)	400 m hurdles	57.15
1989	South American Championships	Medellín, Colombia	4th	400 m	54.34 A
1989	South American Championships	Medellín, Colombia	1st	400 m hurdles	57.68 A CR
1989	South American Championships	Medellín, Colombia	6th	4 × 100 m relay	48.90
1989	South American Championships	Medellín, Colombia	5th	4 × 400 m relay	3:54.6
1989	World Cup	Barcelona, Spain	7th	400 m hurdles	59.00^{1}
1990	Ibero-American Championships	Manaus, Brazil	7th	200 m	25.21 (wind: -0.1 m/s)
1990	Ibero-American Championships	Manaus, Brazil	1st	400 m hurdles	58.31
1990	South American Games	Lima, Peru	1st	400 m hurdles	59.8
1990	South American Games	Lima, Peru	3rd	4 × 400 m relay	3:54.62
1991	South American Championships	Manaus, Brazil	1st	400 m hurdles	57.16 CR
1991	South American Championships	Manaus, Brazil	7th	4 × 100 m relay	50.18
1991	South American Championships	Manaus, Brazil	6th	4 × 400 m relay	3:53.14
1991	World Championships	Tokyo, Japan	32nd (h)	400 m hurdles	61.49
1992	Ibero-American Championships	Seville, Spain	4th (h)	400 m hurdles	1:01.80
1992	Olympic Games	Barcelona, Spain	24th (h)	400 m hurdles	58.55
1993	Bolivarian Games	Cochabamba, Bolivia	1st	400 m hurdles	58.44 A

^{1}Representing the Americas

Olympic Games
Preceded by Héctor Hurtado	Flag bearer for Ecuador; Seoul 1988	Succeeded by María Cangá
