= Jorge da Silva (athlete) =

Brazilian triple jumper

Personal information
- Full name: Jorge Luís Teixeira da Silva
- Born: 4 January 1966 (age 60) Porto Alegre, Brazil
- Height: 1.81 m (5 ft 11 in)
- Weight: 76 kg (168 lb)

Sport
- Sport: Athletics
- Event: Triple jump
- Club: SOCIPA

Jorge Luís Teixeira da Silva (born 4 January 1966) is a Brazilian athlete. He competed in the men's triple jump at the 1988 Summer Olympics and the 1992 Summer Olympics.

== International competitions ==
Year	Competition	Venue	Position	Event	Notes
Representing Brazil
1984	South American Junior Championships	Caracas, Venezuela	2nd	Triple jump	15.29 m
1985	South American Junior Championships	Santa Fe, Argentina	1st	Triple jump	15.41 m
1987	South American Championships	São Paulo, Brazil	4th	Long jump	7.35 m
1987	South American Championships	São Paulo, Brazil	1st	Triple jump	16.24 m
1988	Ibero-American Championships	Mexico City, Mexico	3rd	Triple jump	16.81 m
1988	Olympic Games	Seoul, South Korea	22nd (q)	Triple jump	15.95 m
1989	South American Championships	Medellín, Colombia	3rd	Triple jump	16.38 m
1992	Olympic Games	Barcelona, Spain	38th (q)	Triple jump	15.64 m
