= Athletics at the 1987 Pan American Games – Women's 100 metres =

Women's 100 metres at the Pan American Games

The women's 100 metres event at the 1987 Pan American Games was held in Indianapolis, United States on 9 and 10 August.

== Medalists ==
Gold	Silver	Bronze
Gail Devers; United States	Diane Williams; United States	Pauline Davis; Bahamas

== Results ==
=== Heats ===
Wind:
Heat 1: +3.7 m/s, Heat 2: +3.0 m/s, Heat 3: +2.7 m/s

Rank	Heat	Name	Nationality	Time	Notes
1	1	Gail Devers	United States	11.01	Q
2	2	Diane Williams	United States	11.07	Q
3	1	Liliana Allen	Cuba	11.19	Q
4	3	Pauline Davis	Bahamas	11.28	Q
5	1	Vivienne Spence	Jamaica	11.36	Q
6	2	Eusebia Riquelme	Cuba	11.43	Q
7	3	Angela Phipps	Canada	11.45	Q
8	1	Amparo Caicedo	Colombia	11.54	Q
9	2	Molly Killingbeck	Canada	11.58	Q
10	2	Claudia Acerenza	Uruguay	11.72	Q
10	3	Sheila de Oliveira	Brazil	11.72	Q
10	3	Deborah Bell	Argentina	11.72	Q
13	2	Inês Ribeiro	Brazil	11.78	q
14	1	Alejandra Flores	Mexico	11.90	q
15	2	Elia Mera	Colombia	12.00	q
16	1	Zoila Stewart	Costa Rica	12.15	q
17	1	Terry Daley	United States Virgin Islands	12.44	
18	3	Cislyn Blake	United States Virgin Islands	12.78	
19	3	Adriana Andrade	Ecuador	12.96	
	2	Christa Schumann	Guatemala	DNS	

=== Semifinals ===
Wind:
Heat 1: +4.7 m/s, Heat 2: +3.7 m/s

Rank	Heat	Name	Nationality	Time	Notes
1	1	Gail Devers	United States	10.85	Q
2	2	Diane Williams	United States	10.94	Q
3	2	Pauline Davis	Bahamas	11.16	Q
4	1	Eusebia Riquelme	Cuba	11.21	Q
5	1	Liliana Allen	Cuba	11.21	Q
6	2	Vivienne Spence	Jamaica	11.30	Q
7	2	Angela Phipps	Canada	11.40	Q
8	1	Molly Killingbeck	Canada	11.43	Q
9	1	Sheila de Oliveira	Brazil	11.57	
10	2	Amparo Caicedo	Colombia	11.59	
11	2	Claudia Acerenza	Uruguay	11.63	
12	1	Inês Ribeiro	Brazil	11.79	
13	2	Alejandra Flores	Mexico	11.81	
14	1	Deborah Bell	Argentina	11.85	
15	2	Elia Mera	Colombia	12.02	
16	1	Zoila Stewart	Costa Rica	12.21	

=== Final ===
Wind: -2.0 m/s

Rank	Name	Nationality	Time	Notes
1st place, gold medalist(s)	Gail Devers	United States	11.14	
2nd place, silver medalist(s)	Diane Williams	United States	11.25	
3rd place, bronze medalist(s)	Pauline Davis	Bahamas	11.47	
4	Liliana Allen	Cuba	11.51	
5	Eusebia Riquelme	Cuba	11.65	
6	Vivienne Spence	Jamaica	11.73	
7	Angela Phipps	Canada	11.82	
8	Molly Killingbeck	Canada	11.98	
