= Deborah Bell (athlete) =

Argentine sprinter

Déborah Bell
Personal information
- Full name: Déborah Joyce Bell
- Born: 2 March 1965 (age 61)

Sport
- Sport: Athletics
- Event(s): 100 metres, 200 metres

Déborah Joyce Bell (born 2 March 1965) is a retired Argentinian sprinter. She represented her country in the 60 metres dash at the 1987 World Indoor Championships without reaching the semifinals.

== International competitions ==
Year	Competition	Venue	Position	Event	Notes
Representing Argentina
1986	Ibero-American Championships	Havana, Cuba	7th	100 m	12.18
1986	Ibero-American Championships	Havana, Cuba	10th (h)	200 m	25.28
1986	South American Games	Santiago, Chile	3rd	100 m	12.08
1987	World Indoor Championships	Indianapolis, United States	16th (h)	60 m	7.85
1987	Pan American Games	Indianapolis, United States	14th (sf)	100 m	11.85
1987	Pan American Games	Indianapolis, United States	13th (sf)	200 m	24.61
1987	South American Championships	São Paulo, Brazil	1st	100 m	11.68
1987	South American Championships	São Paulo, Brazil	3rd	200 m	23.87
1987	South American Championships	São Paulo, Brazil	1st	4 × 100 m relay	45.45
1988	Ibero-American Championships	Mexico City, Mexico	11th (h)	100 m	11.82
1988	Ibero-American Championships	Mexico City, Mexico	17th (h)	200 m	25.10
1988	Ibero-American Championships	Mexico City, Mexico	4th	4 × 100 m relay	46.32
1988	Ibero-American Championships	Mexico City, Mexico	6th	4 × 400 m relay	3:42.17

== Personal bests ==
Outdoor

- 100 metres – 11.68 (São Paulo 1987)
- 200 metres – 23.87 (0.0 m/s, São Paulo 1987)
- 100 metres hurdles – 14.88 (Santiago 1984)

Indoor

- 60 metres – 7.85 (Indianapolis 1987)
