= Emilio Ulloa =

Chilean steeplechase and middle-distance runner

Medal record

Athletics

Representing Chile

South American Games
Gold medal – first place	1982 Santa Fe	1500 m
Gold medal – first place	1982 Santa Fe	3000 m steeplechase
Gold medal – first place	1986 Santiago	1500 m
Gold medal – first place	1986 Santiago	3000 m steeplechase
Silver medal – second place	1982 Santa Fe	800 m

Emilio José Ulloa Valenzuela (born October 22, 1954) is a retired male steeplechase runner from Chile.

== Career ==
He represented his native country in the 1984 and 1988 Summer Olympics.

== Achievements ==
Year	Competition	Venue	Position	Event	Notes
Representing Chile
1977	South American Championships	Montevideo, Uruguay	2nd	1500 m	3:51.7
1977	South American Championships	Montevideo, Uruguay	5th	3000 m Steeple	9:27.0
1977	South American Championships	Montevideo, Uruguay	3rd	4 × 400 m relay	3:23.1
1979	South American Championships	Bucaramanga, Colombia	1st	1500 m	3:47.0
1979	South American Championships	Bucaramanga, Colombia	6th	3000 m Steeple	9:12.0
1979	South American Championships	Bucaramanga, Colombia	5th	4 × 400 m relay	3:15.6
1980	Liberty Bell Classic	Philadelphia, United States	9th	1500 m	3:51.67
1981	South American Championships	La Paz, Bolivia	1st	1500 m	4:07.1 A
1981	South American Championships	La Paz, Bolivia	1st	3000 m Steeple	9:53.2 A
1981	South American Championships	La Paz, Bolivia	2nd	4 × 400 m relay	3:11.8
1982	Southern Cross Games	Santa Fe, Argentina	2nd	800 m	1:50.12
1982	Southern Cross Games	Santa Fe, Argentina	1st	1500 m	3:46.70
1982	Southern Cross Games	Santa Fe, Argentina	1st	3000 m Steeple	8:50.6
1983	Pan American Games	Caracas, Venezuela	1st	3000 m Steeple	8:57.62
1983	Ibero-American Championships	Barcelona, Spain	2nd	3000 m Steeple	8:37.36
1983	South American Championships	Santa Fe, Argentina	2nd	800 m	1:49.2
1983	South American Championships	Santa Fe, Argentina	1st	1500 m	3:48.3
1983	South American Championships	Santa Fe, Argentina	1st	3000 m Steeple	8:44.6
1984	Olympic Games	Los Angeles, United States	17th (sf)	3000 m Steeple	8:28.99
1985	World Indoor Games	Paris, France	16th (h)	3000 m	8:19.96
1985	South American Championships	Santiago, Chile	2nd	1500 m	3:43.63
1985	South American Championships	Santiago, Chile	3rd	3000 m Steeple	8:45.27
1986	South American Games	Santiago, Chile	1st	1500 m	3:44.21
1986	South American Games	Santiago, Chile	1st	3000 m Steeple	8:38.49
1987	Pan American Games	Indianapolis, United States	4th	3000 m Steeple	8:37.80
1987	World Championships	Rome, Italy	33rd (h)	3000 m Steeple	8:44.51
1987	South American Championships	São Paulo, Brazil	2nd	1500 m	3:46.69
1987	South American Championships	São Paulo, Brazil	1st	3000 m Steeple	8:51.41
1988	Olympic Games	Seoul, South Korea	–	3000 m Steeple	DNF
