= Osmiro Silva =

Brazilian long-distance runner

Osmiro de Souza Silva (born October 9, 1961 in Itapaci) is a retired long-distance runner from Brazil, who represented his native country in the men's marathon at the 1992 and at the 2000 Summer Olympics. He won the Lisbon Marathon in 1988 and the 1991 edition of the Marrakesh Marathon.

== Achievements ==
- All results regarding marathon, unless stated otherwise

Year	Competition	Venue	Position	Notes
Representing Brazil
1987	South American Championships	São Paulo, Brazil	1st	2:21:06
1992	Olympic Games	Barcelona, Spain	24th	2:17:16
1997	World Championships	Athens, Greece	36th	2:25:37
2000	Olympic Games	Sydney, Australia	—	DNF
