= Claudia Acerenza =

Uruguayan sprinter (born 1966)

Personal information
- Born: 15 January 1966 (age 60)
- Height: 1.60 m (5 ft 3 in)
- Weight: 55 kg (121 lb)

Sport
- Sport: Athletics
- Event(s): 200 m, 400 m
Medal record
Representing Uruguay
South American Games
Gold medal – first place	1986 Santiago	4x100m relay
Silver medal – second place	1986 Santiago	100m
Silver medal – second place	1986 Santiago	200m
Silver medal – second place	1990 Lima	100m
Silver medal – second place	1990 Lima	200m
Silver medal – second place	1990 Lima	400m

Claudia Acerenza Maríez (born 15 January 1966) is a retired Uruguayan sprinter who competed in the 200 and 400 metres. She represented her country at the 1988 Summer Olympics as well as two outdoor and two indoor World Championships. Her twin sister, Soledad Acerenza was also a sprinter.

She still holds national records on several sprinting distances.

== International competitions ==
Year	Competition	Venue	Position	Event	Notes
Representing Uruguay
1983	South American Championships	Santa Fe, Argentina	5th (h)	400 m	57.7
1983	South American Championships	Santa Fe, Argentina	2nd	4 × 100 m relay	47.7
1983	South American Championships	Santa Fe, Argentina	4th	4 × 400 m relay	3:55.9
1984	South American Junior Championships	Caracas, Venezuela	5th	100 m	12.18
1984	South American Junior Championships	Caracas, Venezuela	4th	200 m	24.91
1984	South American Junior Championships	Caracas, Venezuela	3rd	4 × 100 m relay	47.55
1984	South American Junior Championships	Caracas, Venezuela	2nd	4 × 400 m relay	3:51.08
1985	South American Championships	Santiago, Chile	7th	100 m	12.42
1985	South American Championships	Santiago, Chile	6th	200 m	24.73
1985	South American Championships	Santiago, Chile	4th	4 × 100 m relay	46.80
1985	South American Championships	Santiago, Chile	2nd	4 × 400 m relay	3:41.49
1985	South American Junior Championships	Santa Fe, Argentina	2nd	200 m	24.78
1985	South American Junior Championships	Santa Fe, Argentina	1st	4 × 100 m relay	47.72
1985	South American Junior Championships	Santa Fe, Argentina	2nd	4 × 400 m relay	3:41.49
1986	Ibero-American Championships	Havana, Cuba	6th	100 m	12.16
1986	Ibero-American Championships	Havana, Cuba	6th	200 m	24.49 (w)
1986	Ibero-American Championships	Havana, Cuba	8th	400 m	55.62
1986	Ibero-American Championships	Havana, Cuba	4th	4 × 100 m relay	47.58
1986	Ibero-American Championships	Havana, Cuba	5th	4 × 400 m relay	3:54.14
1986	South American Games	Santiago, Chile	2nd	100 m	11.99
1986	South American Games	Santiago, Chile	2nd	200 m	24.30
1986	South American Games	Santiago, Chile	1st	4 × 100 m relay	46.69
1987	Pan American Games	Indianapolis, United States	6th (h)	100 m	11.63
1987	Pan American Games	Indianapolis, United States	8th (h)	200 m	24.21
1987	Pan American Games	Indianapolis, United States	6th	4 × 400 m relay	3:53.76
1987	World Championships	Rome, Italy	20th (h)	200 m	24.24
1987	South American Championships	São Paulo, Brazil	4th	100 m	11.96
1987	South American Championships	São Paulo, Brazil	4th	200 m	24.16
1987	South American Championships	São Paulo, Brazil	3rd	4 × 100 m relay	46.54
1987	South American Championships	São Paulo, Brazil	4th	4 × 400 m relay	3:47.46
1988	Ibero-American Championships	Mexico City, Mexico	8th	100 m	11.92
1988	Ibero-American Championships	Mexico City, Mexico	6th	200 m	23.78
1988	Ibero-American Championships	Mexico City, Mexico	–	4 × 400 m relay	DQ
1988	Olympic Games	Seoul, South Korea	49th (h)	100 m	12.11
1988	Olympic Games	Seoul, South Korea	41st (h)	200 m	24.46
1989	World Indoor Championships	Budapest, Hungary	–	200 m	DQ
1989	South American Championships	Medellín, Colombia	7th	100 m	11.9
1989	South American Championships	Medellín, Colombia	5th	200 m	24.07
1989	South American Championships	Medellín, Colombia	3rd	4 × 100 m relay	46.61
1989	South American Championships	Medellín, Colombia	3rd	4 × 400 m relay	3:44.0
1990	Ibero-American Championships	Manaus, Brazil	5th	200 m	24.62
1990	Ibero-American Championships	Manaus, Brazil	6th	400 m	54.69
1990	Ibero-American Championships	Manaus, Brazil	3rd	4 × 100 m relay	47.10
1990	Ibero-American Championships	Manaus, Brazil	3rd	4 × 400 m relay	3:43.6
1990	South American Games	Lima, Peru	2nd	100 m	12.20
1990	South American Games	Lima, Peru	2nd	200 m	25.75
1990	South American Games	Lima, Peru	2nd	400 m	55.22
1991	World Indoor Championships	Seville, Spain	19th (h)	200 m	25.69
1991	World Indoor Championships	Seville, Spain	15th (h)	400 m	56.57
1991	South American Championships	Manaus, Brazil	5th	200 m	24.27
1991	South American Championships	Manaus, Brazil	4th	400 m	54.55
1991	South American Championships	Manaus, Brazil	5th	4 × 100 m relay	46.61
1991	South American Championships	Manaus, Brazil	3rd	4 × 400 m relay	3:40.19
1991	Pan American Games	Havana, Cuba	12th (h)	200 m	24.85
1991	Pan American Games	Havana, Cuba	11th (h)	400 m	55.43
1991	Pan American Games	Havana, Cuba	6th	4 × 400 m relay	3:50.93
1991	World Championships	Tokyo, Japan	24th (h)	200 m	24.66
1991	World Championships	Tokyo, Japan	28th (h)	400 m	55.82
1992	Ibero-American Championships	Seville, Spain	9th (h)	200 m	24.70
1992	Ibero-American Championships	Seville, Spain	10th (h)	400 m	56.25
1992	Ibero-American Championships	Seville, Spain	5th	4 × 100 m relay	46.51
1992	Ibero-American Championships	Seville, Spain	3rd	4 × 400 m relay	3:46.73
1994	Ibero-American Championships	Mar del Plata, Argentina	9th	100 m	12.43
1994	Ibero-American Championships	Mar del Plata, Argentina	5th	4 × 100 m relay	47.01
1994	Ibero-American Championships	Mar del Plata, Argentina	4th	4 × 400 m relay	3:46.24
1997	South American Championships	Mar del Plata, Argentina	8th	100 m	12.36
1997	South American Championships	Mar del Plata, Argentina	4th	4 × 100 m relay	47.72
1997	South American Championships	Mar del Plata, Argentina	4th	4 × 400 m relay	3:55.85

== Personal bests ==
Outdoor

- 100 metres – 11.54 (Mexico City 1988) NR
- 200 metres – 23.78 (Mexico City 1988) NR
- 400 metres – 55.82 (Tokyo 1991)

Indoor

- 200 metres – 25.69 (Seville 1991)
- 400 metres – 56.57 (Seville 1991) NR
