= Oscar Diesel =

Paraguayan athlete

Personal information
- Nationality: Paraguayan
- Born: 19 September 1961 (age 64)
- Height: 1.78 m (5 ft 10 in)
- Weight: 74 kg (163 lb)

Sport
- Sport: Athletics
- Events: Long jump Triple jump

Oscar Diesel (born 19 September 1961) is a Paraguayan athlete. He competed in the men's long jump and the men's triple jump at the 1984 Summer Olympics.
