= Ricardo Valiente =

Peruvian athlete (born 1968)

Personal information
- Nationality: Peruvian
- Born: 22 August 1968 (age 57)

Sport
- Sport: Athletics
- Events: Long jump Triple jump
Medal record
Representing Peru
South American Championships
| Silver medal – second place | 1993 Lima | Triple jump |
| Bronze medal – third place | 1993 Lima | Long jump |
| Bronze medal – third place | 1987 São Paulo | Long jump |
Ibero-American Championships
| Bronze medal – third place | 1990 Manaus | Triple jump |
South American Games
| Gold medal – first place | 1990 Lima | Triple jump |
| Silver medal – second place | 1990 Lima | Long jump |
| Bronze medal – third place | 1986 Santiago | Triple jump |
Bolivarian Games
| Gold medal – first place | 1993 Cochabamba | Long jump |
| Silver medal – second place | 1993 Cochabamba | Triple jump |
| Bronze medal – third place | 1989 Maracaibo | Triple jump |
| Bronze medal – third place | 1985 Cuenca | Triple jump |

Ricardo Valiente Román (born 22 August 1968) is a Peruvian athlete. He competed in the men's long jump and the men's triple jump at the 1988 Summer Olympics.
