= Manuel Moreno (sprinter) =

Spanish sprinter

Personal information
- Nationality: Spanish
- Born: Manuel Moreno Sánchez; 25 April 1967 (age 59) Madrid, Spain

Sport
- Sport: Sprinting
- Event: 4 × 400 metres relay

Manuel Moreno Sánchez (born 25 April 1967) is a Spanish sprinter. He competed in the men's 4 × 400 metres relay at the 1992 Summer Olympics.
