= Cláudio Bertolino =

Brazilian racewalker

Personal information
- Full name: Cláudio Luiz Bertolino
- Born: 31 March 1963 (age 63) Santa Bárbara d'Oeste, Brazil
- Height: 1.74 m (5 ft 9 in)
- Weight: 65 kg (143 lb)

Sport
- Sport: Athletics
- Event: Racewalking
- Club: Funilense/Cosmópolis

Cláudio Luiz Bertolino (born 31 March 1963) is a Brazilian racewalker. He competed in the men's 20 kilometres walk at the 1996 Summer Olympics.
