= 1983 South American Championships in Athletics – Results =

These are the results of the 1983 South American Championships in Athletics which took place at the Centro de Alto Rendimiento Deportivo Pedro Candioti in Santa Fe, Argentina, between 29 September and 2 October.

== Men's results ==
=== 100 metres ===
Heats – 29 September
Wind:
Heat 1: -1.0 m/s, Heat 2: -0.4 m/s

Rank	Heat	Name	Nationality	Time	Notes
1	1	Nelson dos Santos	Brazil	10.8	Q
2	1	Luis Alberto Schneider	Chile	10.8	Q
3	1	Luis Cabral	Uruguay	10.9	Q
4	1	Oscar Barrionuevo	Argentina	11.2	Q
5	1	Ronald Raborg	Peru	11.3	Q
6	1	Luis Villalba	Paraguay	11.3	
1	2	Paulo Roberto Correia	Brazil	10.7	Q
2	2	Giorgio Mautino	Peru	10.8	Q
3	2	Hugo Alzamora	Argentina	10.8	Q
4	2	Marcelo Urquiza	Chile	10.9	Q
5	2	Marcelo Rejas	Bolivia	11.0	Q
6	2	Daniel Ipata	Uruguay	11.3	

Final – 29 September

Wind: -0.7 m/s

Rank	Name	Nationality	Time	Notes
1st place, gold medalist(s)	Nelson dos Santos	Brazil	10.3	
2nd place, silver medalist(s)	Paulo Roberto Correia	Brazil	10.5	
3rd place, bronze medalist(s)	Giorgio Mautino	Peru	10.5	
4	Luis Alberto Schneider	Chile	10.7	
5	Hugo Alzamora	Argentina	10.7	
6	Oscar Barrionuevo	Argentina	10.8	
7	Marcelo Urquiza	Chile	10.9	
8	Luis Cabral	Uruguay	10.9	
9	Marcelo Rejas	Bolivia	10.9	
10	Ronald Raborg	Peru	11.2	

=== 200 metres ===
Heats – 30 September
Wind:
Heat 1: -0.1 m/s, Heat 2: -3.8 m/s

Rank	Heat	Name	Nationality	Time	Notes
1	1	Gustavo Capart	Argentina	21.9	Q
2	1	Marcelo Rejas	Bolivia	22.2	Q
3	1	Nelson dos Santos	Brazil	22.3	Q
4	1	Rubén da Cunha	Uruguay	22.4	Q
5	1	Carlos Contreras	Chile	22.4	
6	1	Luis Villalba	Paraguay	22.5	
1	2	Paulo Roberto Correia	Brazil	21.7	Q
2	2	Wolfman Mena	Colombia	21.9	Q
3	2	José María Beduino	Argentina	22.0	Q
4	2	Luis Alberto Schneider	Chile	22.0	Q
5	2	Luis Cabral	Uruguay	22.6	

Final – 30 September

Wind: -1.8 m/s

Rank	Name	Nationality	Time	Notes
1st place, gold medalist(s)	Paulo Roberto Correia	Brazil	21.3	
2nd place, silver medalist(s)	Nelson dos Santos	Brazil	21.5	
3rd place, bronze medalist(s)	José María Beduino	Argentina	21.7	
4	Luis Alberto Schneider	Chile	21.8	
5	Wolfman Mena	Colombia	21.9	
6	Gustavo Capart	Argentina	21.9	
7	Rubén da Cunha	Uruguay	22.3	
8	Marcelo Rejas	Bolivia	22.4	

=== 400 metres ===
Heats – 29 September

Rank	Heat	Name	Nationality	Time	Notes
1	1	Sérgio Menezes	Brazil	49.2	Q
2	1	Moisés del Castillo	Peru	49.4	Q
3	1	Wolfman Mena	Colombia	49.4	Q
4	1	Eduardo Sandes	Argentina	49.5	Q
5	1	Gabriel Díaz	Uruguay	51.5	
1	2	Evaldo da Silva	Brazil	48.9	Q
2	2	Jesús Malavé	Venezuela	48.9	Q
3	2	Daniel Bambicha	Argentina	49.1	Q
4	2	Rodrigo de la Fuente	Chile	49.1	Q
5	2	Rubén da Cunha	Uruguay	50.4	
6	2	Cayetano Báez	Paraguay	51.7	

Final – 30 September

Rank	Name	Nationality	Time	Notes
1st place, gold medalist(s)	Sérgio Menezes	Brazil	46.8	
2nd place, silver medalist(s)	Evaldo da Silva	Brazil	47.4	
3rd place, bronze medalist(s)	Wolfman Mena	Colombia	47.5	
4	Jesús Malavé	Venezuela	48.0	
5	Rodrigo de la Fuente	Chile	49.2	
6	Moisés del Castillo	Peru	49.3	
7	Daniel Bambicha	Argentina	49.3	
8	Eduardo Sandes	Argentina	49.3	

=== 800 metres ===
Heats – 29 September

Rank	Heat	Name	Nationality	Time	Notes
1	1	Raúl López	Argentina	1:55.2	Q
2	1	Francisco Figueredo	Paraguay	1:55.4	Q
3	1	Eulogio Medina	Uruguay	1:55.4	Q
4	1	Emilio Ulloa	Chile	1:55.6	Q
5	1	Ricardo Taborda	Bolivia	1:58.0	
1	2	José Luíz Barbosa	Brazil	1:55.7	Q
2	2	Manuel Maugard	Chile	1:56.4	Q
3	2	Luis Migueles	Argentina	1:56.7	Q
4	2	Eduardo Pagalday	Uruguay	1:56.9	Q
5	2	Leopoldo Acosta	Ecuador	1:58.3	

Final – 30 September

Rank	Name	Nationality	Time	Notes
1st place, gold medalist(s)	José Luíz Barbosa	Brazil	1:49.1	
2nd place, silver medalist(s)	Emilio Ulloa	Chile	1:49.2	
3rd place, bronze medalist(s)	Raúl López	Argentina	1:50.5	
4	Luis Migueles	Argentina	1:50.7	
5	Manuel Maugard	Chile	1:51.7	
6	Eduardo Pagalday	Uruguay	1:51.8	
7	Eulogio Medina	Uruguay	1:53.2	
8	Francisco Figueredo	Paraguay	1:53.6	

=== 1500 metres ===
2 October

Rank	Name	Nationality	Time	Notes
1st place, gold medalist(s)	Emilio Ulloa	Chile	3:48.3	
2nd place, silver medalist(s)	Omar Ortega	Argentina	3:48.9	
3rd place, bronze medalist(s)	Adauto Domingues	Brazil	3:50.8	
4	Ricardo Vera	Uruguay	3:51.3	
5	Manuel Maugard	Chile	3:51.8	
6	Orlando Campos	Colombia	3:56.2	
7	Wilson de Santana	Brazil	3:57.1	
8	Eduardo Pagalday	Uruguay	4:00.9	
9	Francisco Figueredo	Paraguay	4:01.2	
10	Omar Amdematten	Argentina	4:02.1	
11	Ricardo Taborda	Bolivia	4:06.0	
12	Vicente Medina	Paraguay	4:09.3	

=== 5000 metres ===
29 September

Rank	Name	Nationality	Time	Notes
1st place, gold medalist(s)	Omar Aguilar	Chile	14:00.9	
2nd place, silver medalist(s)	João de Ataíde	Brazil	14:01.2	
3rd place, bronze medalist(s)	Germán Peña	Colombia	14:03.1	
4	Jaime Vergara	Chile	14:05.7	
5	Julio Gómez	Argentina	14:17.9	
6	Policarpio Calizaya	Bolivia	14:22.8	
7	Roberto Wendorff	Argentina	14:23.8	
8	Jairo Correa	Colombia	14:41.3	
9	Ricardo Reupo	Peru	14:42.6	
10	Ricardo Vera	Uruguay	14:54.8	
11	Ramón López	Paraguay	14:58.6	
12	Eladio Fernández	Paraguay	15:01.9	

=== 10,000 metres ===
30 September

Rank	Name	Nationality	Time	Notes
1st place, gold medalist(s)	Omar Aguilar	Chile	29:12.1	
2nd place, silver medalist(s)	João de Ataíde	Brazil	29:13.4	
3rd place, bronze medalist(s)	Jairo Correa	Colombia	29:22.7	
4	João de Souza	Brazil	29:26.1	
5	Jaime Vergara	Chile	29:33.1	
6	Policarpio Calizaya	Bolivia	29:45.0	
7	Germán Peña	Colombia	30:22.9	
8	Carlos Castro	Argentina	30:24.2	
9	Félix Rivedieu	Uruguay	30:52.0	
10	Nelson Zamora	Uruguay	30:58.8	
11	Ramón López	Paraguay	30:58.9	
12	Eladio Fernández	Paraguay	31:00.0	
13	Jorge Monín	Argentina	31:55.6	

=== Marathon ===
2 October

Rank	Name	Nationality	Time	Notes
1st place, gold medalist(s)	Juan Plagman	Chile	2:15:50	
2nd place, silver medalist(s)	Jairo Correa	Colombia	2:17:43	
3rd place, bronze medalist(s)	Rafael Parra	Colombia	2:19:42	
4	Hugo Soto	Chile	2:24:23	
5	Raúl Suárez	Argentina	2:25:52	
6	Luis Esterio	Argentina	2:27:48	
7	Rufino Chávez	Bolivia	2:31:42	

=== 110 metres hurdles ===
2 October
Wind: +0.9 m/s

Rank	Name	Nationality	Time	Notes
1st place, gold medalist(s)	Pedro Chiamulera	Brazil	14.3	
2nd place, silver medalist(s)	Wellington da Nobrega	Brazil	14.5	
3rd place, bronze medalist(s)	Rodolfo Iturraspe	Argentina	14.9	
4	Carlos Varas	Argentina	15.1	
5	Andrés Lyon	Chile	15.1	
6	George Biehl	Chile	15.1	

=== 400 metres hurdles ===
Heats – 29 September

Rank	Heat	Name	Nationality	Time	Notes
1	1	Rodrigo de la Fuente	Chile	54.6	Q
2	1	Jorge Díaz	Argentina	54.6	Q
3	1	Leonel Pedroza	Colombia	54.9	Q
4	1	Pedro Chiamulera	Brazil	55.0	Q
5	1	Carlos Lima	Uruguay	55.8	
1	2	Rodolfo Iturraspe	Argentina	56.6	Q
2	2	Elias da Fonseca	Brazil	58.2	Q
3	2	Jorge Misleck	Chile	58.6	Q
4	2	Adolfo Marín	Paraguay	1:00.8	Q

Final – 30 September

Rank	Name	Nationality	Time	Notes
1st place, gold medalist(s)	Pedro Chiamulera	Brazil	52.2	
2nd place, silver medalist(s)	Rodrigo de la Fuente	Chile	52.7	
3rd place, bronze medalist(s)	Elias da Fonseca	Brazil	52.8	
4	Jorge Díaz	Argentina	53.0	
5	Rodolfo Iturraspe	Argentina	53.7	
6	Leonel Pedroza	Colombia	53.9	
7	Jorge Misleck	Chile	55.3	
8	Adolfo Marín	Paraguay	1:03.8	

=== 3000 metres steeplechase ===
1 October

Rank	Name	Nationality	Time	Notes
1st place, gold medalist(s)	Emilio Ulloa	Chile	8:44.6	CR
2nd place, silver medalist(s)	Wilson de Santana	Brazil	8:47.7	
3rd place, bronze medalist(s)	Adauto Domingues	Brazil	8:50.8	
4	Ricardo Vera	Uruguay	8:53.9	
5	Luis Palma	Chile	8:57.7	
6	Orlando Campos	Colombia	8:59.4	
7	Ricardo Reupo	Peru	9:05.4	
8	Marcelo Cascabelo	Argentina	9:20.3	
9	Diego Zarba	Argentina	9:22.1	
10	Eladio Fernández	Paraguay	9:23.4	
11	Ramón López	Paraguay	9:37.6	

=== 4 × 100 metres relay ===
2 October

Rank	Nation	Competitors	Time	Notes
1st place, gold medalist(s)	Brazil	Marcus Barros, Nelson dos Santos, Paulo Correia, Sérgio Menezes	40.7	
2nd place, silver medalist(s)	Argentina	Alfredo Muro, Oscar Barrionuevo, Hugo Alzamora, José María Beduino	40.8	
3rd place, bronze medalist(s)	Uruguay	Luis Cabral, Daniel Ipata, Anataniel Guzmán, Rubén da Cunha	41.4	
4	Chile	Carlos Contreras, Francisco Pichott, Marcelo Urquiza, Luis Alberto Schneider	42.0	
5	Peru	Enrique Goytisolo, Ronald Raborg, Fernando Valiente, Moisés del Castillo	44.6	
6	Paraguay	Luis Villalba, Cayetano Báez, Vicente Medina, Adolfo Marín	45.7	

=== 4 × 400 metres relay ===
30 September

Rank	Nation	Competitors	Time	Notes
1st place, gold medalist(s)	Brazil	Paulo Roberto Correia, Evaldo da Silva, José Luíz Barbosa, Sérgio Menezes	3:10.8	
2nd place, silver medalist(s)	Chile	Carlos Contreras, Rodrigo de la Fuente, Luis Alberto Schneider, Mauricio Urquiza	3:13.6	
3rd place, bronze medalist(s)	Argentina	Eduardo Sandes, Daniel Bambicha, Hugo Alzamora, Raúl López	3:14.5	
4	Uruguay	Anataniel Guzmán, Gabriel Díaz, Daniel Ipata, Rubén da Cunha	3:19.3	
5	Paraguay	Cayetano Báez, Francisco Figueredo, Vicente Medina, Luis Villalba	NT	
6	Peru	Velezmoro, Ronald Raborg, Ricardo Reupo, Moisés del Castillo	3:31.4	

=== 20 kilometres ===
1 October

Rank	Name	Nationality	Time	Notes
1st place, gold medalist(s)	Héctor Moreno	Colombia	1:24:12	CR
2nd place, silver medalist(s)	Francisco Vargas	Colombia	1:25:35	
3rd place, bronze medalist(s)	Oswaldo Morejón	Bolivia	1:32:20	
4	Jorge Yannone	Argentina	1:33:01	
5	Wilson de Matos	Brazil	1:35:24	
6	Rito Molina	Argentina	1:45:54	
7	Julio Llanga	Ecuador	1:53:04	

=== High jump ===
2 October

Rank	Name	Nationality	Result	Notes
1st place, gold medalist(s)	Jorge Archanjo	Brazil	2.14	
2nd place, silver medalist(s)	Fernando Pastoriza	Argentina	2.14	
3rd place, bronze medalist(s)	Rodrigo de la Fuente	Chile	2.04	
4	Horacio Acevedo	Argentina	2.04	
5	Joaquín del Real	Chile	2.00	
6	Fernando Valiente	Peru	1.95	
7	Carlos Falloni	Peru	1.95	
8	Sergio de Jesús	Brazil	1.95	
9	Rubén Osorio	Paraguay	1.95	
10	Gabriel Terra	Uruguay	1.85	

=== Pole vault ===
1 October

Rank	Name	Nationality	Result	Notes
1st place, gold medalist(s)	Fernando Hoces	Chile	4.70	
2nd place, silver medalist(s)	Renato Bortolocci	Brazil	4.60	
3rd place, bronze medalist(s)	Walter Franzantti	Argentina	4.50	
3rd place, bronze medalist(s)	Oscar Veit	Argentina	4.50	
5	Enrique Goytisolo	Peru	4.40	
6	Marcelo Cibié	Chile	4.40	
7	Elson de Souza	Brazil	4.40	
8	Henry Gómez	Colombia	4.15	

=== Long jump ===
30 September

Rank	Name	Nationality	Result	Notes
1st place, gold medalist(s)	Osvaldo Frigerio	Argentina	7.51	
2nd place, silver medalist(s)	Luiz Carlos Favero	Brazil	7.41	
3rd place, bronze medalist(s)	Marcus Barros	Brazil	7.28	
4	Marcelo Abásolo	Chile	7.12	
5	Gabriel Martínez	Argentina	7.11	
6	Óscar Diesel	Paraguay	6.96	
7	Francisco Pichott	Chile	6.85	
8	Fidel Solórzano	Ecuador	6.71	
9	Ronald Raborg	Peru	6.62	
10	Gustavo González	Uruguay	6.59	

=== Triple jump ===
29 September

Rank	Name	Nationality	Result	Notes
1st place, gold medalist(s)	Francisco Pichott	Chile	15.64	
2nd place, silver medalist(s)	José Quiñaliza	Ecuador	15.52	
3rd place, bronze medalist(s)	Jailto Bonfim	Brazil	15.44	
4	Angel Gagliano	Argentina	15.43	
5	Marcelo Abásolo	Chile	14.92	
6	Óscar Diesel	Paraguay	14.77	
7	Jorge Mazzeo	Argentina	14.59	
8	Miguel Vélez	Peru	14.17	

=== Shot put ===
30 September

Rank	Name	Nationality	Result	Notes
1st place, gold medalist(s)	Gert Weil	Chile	18.29	CR
2nd place, silver medalist(s)	Juan Adolfo Turri	Argentina	16.56	
3rd place, bronze medalist(s)	Adilson Oliveira	Brazil	15.70	
4	Gerardo Carucci	Argentina	15.66	
5	José Carlos Jacques	Brazil	15.36	
6	Andrés Pérez	Chile	14.10	
7	Óscar Gadea	Uruguay	13.95	
8	José Orozco	Colombia	13.54	

=== Discus throw ===
1 October

Rank	Name	Nationality	Result	Notes
1st place, gold medalist(s)	José Carlos Jacques	Brazil	51.86	
2nd place, silver medalist(s)	Celso da Cunha	Brazil	50.50	
3rd place, bronze medalist(s)	Andrés Pérez	Chile	49.24	
4	José Orozco	Colombia	49.06	
5	Gert Weil	Chile	48.56	
6	Norberto Aimé	Argentina	46.94	
7	Carlos Bryner	Argentina	46.42	
8	Dante Retamal	Peru	41.48	
9	Óscar Gadea	Uruguay	39.56	

=== Hammer throw ===
29 September

Rank	Name	Nationality	Result	Notes
1st place, gold medalist(s)	Ivam Bertelli	Brazil	61.16	
2nd place, silver medalist(s)	Roberto Olcece	Argentina	60.56	
3rd place, bronze medalist(s)	Pedro Rivail Atílio	Brazil	59.74	
4	Daniel Gómez	Argentina	55.36	
5	Víctor Guerrero	Chile	50.70	
6	Dante Retamal	Peru	49.56	

=== Javelin throw ===
2 October – Old model

Rank	Name	Nationality	Result	Notes
1st place, gold medalist(s)	José Carlos Lima e Souza	Brazil	74.54	
2nd place, silver medalist(s)	Antar Martínez	Colombia	71.48	
3rd place, bronze medalist(s)	Amílcar de Barros	Brazil	71.24	
4	Juan Francisco Garmendia	Argentina	70.62	
5	Jesús López	Argentina	64.42	
6	Gustavo Wielandt	Chile	62.12	
7	Carlos González	Uruguay	62.00	

=== Decathlon ===
29–30 September – 1962 tables (1985 conversions given with *)

The highest mark recorded in each event is highlighted in yellow

Rank	Athlete	Nationality	100m	LJ	SP	HJ	400m	110m H	DT	PV	JT	1500m	Points	Conv.	Notes
1st place, gold medalist(s)	Carlos Gambetta	Argentina	11.0	7.04	14.00	2.02	50.4	16.6	37.48	4.40	49.46	5:08.0	7252	7052*	
2nd place, silver medalist(s)	Ronaldo Alcaraz	Brazil	11.6	7.14	13.19	1.87	53.0	16.0	39.72	4.00	60.38	4:45.8	7096	6936*	
3rd place, bronze medalist(s)	Antonio Balbuena	Brazil	11.0	6.95	11.26	1.84	49.6	15.7	33.80	3.70	51.34	4:37.2	6959	6781*	
4	Tito Steiner	Argentina	11.6	6.82	15.85	1.99	51.0	15.4	47.82	NM	56.10	5:07.6	6617	6648*	
5	Domingo Hinostroza	Colombia	11.5	6.42	12.88	1.87	51.5	15.3	31.50	2.90	53.04	4:44.5	6517	6368*	
6	Eduardo Orellana	Chile	12.0	6.71	10.43	1.78	52.1	18.0	34.94	3.80	50.62	4:31.1	6349	6147*	
	Freddy Aberdeen	Venezuela	?	?	?	?	?	?	?	?	?	?	DNF	–	

== Women's results ==
=== 100 metres ===
2 October
Wind: +0.4 m/s

Rank	Name	Nationality	Time	Notes
1st place, gold medalist(s)	Esmeralda de Jesus Garcia	Brazil	11.6	
2nd place, silver medalist(s)	Sheila de Oliveira	Brazil	11.8	
3rd place, bronze medalist(s)	Daisy Salas	Chile	11.9	
4	Adriana Pero	Argentina	12.1	
5	Julia Schuth	Argentina	12.1	
6	Graciela Maidana	Paraguay	12.6	
7	Adriana Ruffin	Chile	12.6	
8	Victoria Rolón	Paraguay	12.9	

=== 200 metres ===
Heats – 29 September
Wind:
Heat 1: -0.1 m/s, Heat 2: -0.4 m/s

Rank	Heat	Name	Nationality	Time	Notes
1	1	Jucilene Garcês	Brazil	24.7	Q
2	1	Adriana Pero	Argentina	24.9	Q
3	1	Margarita Grun	Uruguay	25.7	Q
4	1	Cecilia Rodríguez	Chile	26.0	Q
5	1	Victoria Rolón	Paraguay	27.0	
1	2	Sheila de Oliveira	Brazil	24.9	Q
2	2	Daisy Salas	Chile	25.2	Q
3	2	Susana Crespo	Argentina	25.6	Q
4	2	Laura Roballo	Uruguay	26.0	Q
5	2	Graciela Maidana	Paraguay	26.5	

Final – 30 September

Wind: -1.5 m/s

Rank	Name	Nationality	Time	Notes
1st place, gold medalist(s)	Jucilene Garcês	Brazil	24.5	
2nd place, silver medalist(s)	Sheila de Oliveira	Brazil	24.9	
3rd place, bronze medalist(s)	Margarita Grun	Uruguay	24.9	
4	Daisy Salas	Chile	25.1	
5	Adriana Pero	Argentina	25.2	
6	Susana Crespo	Argentina	25.3	
7	Cecilia Rodríguez	Chile	25.9	
8	Laura Roballo	Uruguay	26.9	

=== 400 metres ===
Heats – 1 October

Rank	Heat	Name	Nationality	Time	Notes
1	1	Jucilene Garcês	Brazil	59.4	Q
2	1	Graciela Mardones	Chile	59.5	Q
3	1	Amalia Linietzky	Argentina	1:03.4	Q
4	1	Margarita Grun	Uruguay	1:03.5	Q
1	2	Elba Barbosa	Brazil	55.6	Q
2	2	Norfalia Carabalí	Colombia	56.3	Q
3	2	Marcela López	Argentina	57.3	Q
4	2	Cecilia Roríguez	Chile	57.6	Q
5	2	Claudia Acerenza	Uruguay	57.7	

Final – 2 October

Rank	Name	Nationality	Time	Notes
1st place, gold medalist(s)	Elba Barbosa	Brazil	54.0	
2nd place, silver medalist(s)	Jucilene Garcês	Brazil	54.0	
3rd place, bronze medalist(s)	Norfalia Carabalí	Colombia	54.8	
4	Margarita Grun	Uruguay	55.6	
5	Graciela Mardones	Chile	55.9	
6	Marcela López	Argentina	56.6	
7	Cecilia Roríguez	Chile	57.1	
8	Amalia Linietzky	Argentina	58.0	

=== 800 metres ===
Heats – 29 September

Rank	Heat	Name	Nationality	Time	Notes
1	1	Norfalia Carabalí	Colombia	2:19.2	Q
2	1	Graciela Mardones	Chile	2:19.3	Q
3	1	Maria do Carmo Fialho	Brazil	2:19.3	Q
4	1	Marcela López	Argentina	2:19.4	Q
5	1	Ana Peñalba	Uruguay	2:20.0	
6	1	Gladys Barufaldi	Paraguay	2:26.0	
1	2	Alejandra Ramos	Chile	2:16.7	Q
2	2	Adriana Marchena	Venezuela	2:16.7	Q
3	2	Soraya Telles	Brazil	2:16.8	Q
4	2	Liliana Góngora	Argentina	2:16.9	Q
5	2	Sandra Silvera	Uruguay	2:17.8	

Final – 30 September

Rank	Name	Nationality	Time	Notes
1st place, gold medalist(s)	Alejandra Ramos	Chile	2:04.6	
2nd place, silver medalist(s)	Soraya Telles	Brazil	2:06.2	
3rd place, bronze medalist(s)	Norfalia Carabalí	Colombia	2:07.2	
4	Adriana Marchena	Venezuela	2:08.3	
5	Graciela Mardones	Chile	2:08.7	
6	Maria do Carmo Fialho	Brazil	2:09.0	
7	Liliana Góngora	Argentina	2:09.8	
8	Marcela López	Argentina	2:12.2	

=== 1500 metres ===
1 October

Rank	Name	Nationality	Time	Notes
1st place, gold medalist(s)	Alejandra Ramos	Chile	4:25.3	
2nd place, silver medalist(s)	Mónica Regonesi	Chile	4:27.2	
3rd place, bronze medalist(s)	Adriana Marchena	Venezuela	4:27.5	
4	Liliana Góngora	Argentina	4:28.4	
5	Soraya Telles	Brazil	4:29.3	
6	Ruth Campos	Peru	4:35.4	
7	Cecilia Ramón	Argentina	4:40.9	
8	Sandra Silveira	Uruguay	4:45.2	
9	Teresa Rodríguez	Colombia	4:45.4	
10	Kathy Silva	Uruguay	4:49.3	
11	Dalvirene de Paiva	Brazil	4:49.8	
12	Maricruz Sanjines	Bolivia	4:50.0	
13	Gladys Barufaldi	Paraguay	5:05.8	

=== 3000 metres ===
2 October

Rank	Name	Nationality	Time	Notes
1st place, gold medalist(s)	Mónica Regonesi	Chile	9:57.2	CR
2nd place, silver medalist(s)	María Victoria Biondi	Argentina	10:02.2	
3rd place, bronze medalist(s)	Ruth Campos	Peru	10:06.3	
4	Angélica de Almeida	Brazil	10:10.9	
5	Teresa Rodríguez	Colombia	10:11.9	
6	Stella Selles	Argentina	10:18.1	
7	Dalvirene de Paiva	Brazil	10:27.1	
8	Maricruz Sanjines	Bolivia	10:30.2	
9	Kathy Silva	Uruguay	10:57.5	

=== 100 metres hurdles ===
2 October
Wind: -0.3 m/s

Rank	Name	Nationality	Time	Notes
1st place, gold medalist(s)	Beatriz Capotosto	Argentina	13.2	AR
2nd place, silver medalist(s)	Juraciara da Silva	Brazil	13.7	
3rd place, bronze medalist(s)	Orlane dos Santos	Brazil	14.4	
4	Alejandra Martínez	Chile	14.7	
5	Susan Jenkins	Argentina	14.9	
6	Paulina Caroca	Chile	15.2	

=== 400 metres hurdles ===
30 September

Rank	Name	Nationality	Time	Notes
1st place, gold medalist(s)	Conceição Geremias	Brazil	59.5	CR
2nd place, silver medalist(s)	Margit Weise	Brazil	1:00.5	
3rd place, bronze medalist(s)	Anabella dal Lago	Argentina	1:02.6	
4	Mariana Posz	Argentina	1:02.8	
5	Lucy Fernández	Uruguay	1:04.9	
6	Paulina Caroca	Chile	1:06.2	
7	María Esther Mediano	Chile	1:06.5	
8	Gladys Barufaldi	Paraguay	1:08.4	

=== 4 × 100 metres relay ===
2 October

Rank	Nation	Competitors	Time	Notes
1st place, gold medalist(s)	Brazil	Elba Barbosa, Juraciara da Silva, Esmeralda Garcia, Sheila de Oliveira	45.4	
2nd place, silver medalist(s)	Uruguay	Graciela Acosta, Andrea Sassi, Claudia Acerenza, Margarita Grun	47.7	
	Argentina		DQ	
	Chile		DQ	

=== 4 × 400 metres relay ===
30 September

Rank	Nation	Competitors	Time	Notes
1st place, gold medalist(s)	Brazil	Margit Weise, Maria do Carmo Fialho, Jucilene Garcês, Elba Barbosa	3:40.0	CR
2nd place, silver medalist(s)	Chile	Graciela Mardones, Paola Raab, Alejandra Ramos, Cecilia Rodríguez	3:45.3	
3rd place, bronze medalist(s)	Argentina	Amalia Linietzky, Marcela López, María Elena Croatto, Andrea Fuchs	3:48.7	
4	Uruguay	Ana Peñalba, Lucy Fernández, Claudia Acerenza, Margarita Grun	3:55.9	

=== High jump ===
29 September

Rank	Name	Nationality	Result	Notes
1st place, gold medalist(s)	Orlane dos Santos	Brazil	1.80	
2nd place, silver medalist(s)	Conceição Geremias	Brazil	1.77	
3rd place, bronze medalist(s)	Liliana Arigoni	Argentina	1.71	
3rd place, bronze medalist(s)	Carmen Garib	Chile	1.71	
5	Victoria Vacarezza	Chile	1.68	
6	Andrea Sassi	Uruguay	1.68	
7	Mónica Halporn	Argentina	1.60	

=== Long jump ===
1 October

Rank	Name	Nationality	Result	Notes
1st place, gold medalist(s)	Esmeralda de Jesus Garcia	Brazil	6.12	
2nd place, silver medalist(s)	Adriana Rufin	Chile	5.84	
3rd place, bronze medalist(s)	Orlane dos Santos	Brazil	5.79	
4	Graciela Acosta	Uruguay	5.61	
5	Paola Raab	Chile	5.49	
6	Yvonne Neddermann	Argentina	5.47	
7	Liliana Derfler	Argentina	5.36	
8	Andrea Sassi	Uruguay	5.22	
9	Graciela Maidana	Paraguay	4.80	

=== Shot put ===
2 October

Rank	Name	Nationality	Result	Notes
1st place, gold medalist(s)	Maria Fernandes	Brazil	15.01	CR
2nd place, silver medalist(s)	Marinalva dos Santos	Brazil	14.87	
3rd place, bronze medalist(s)	Jazmín Cirio	Chile	14.04	
4	Luz Bohorquez	Venezuela	13.65	
5	Alejandra Bevacqua	Argentina	13.12	
6	María Isabel Urrutia	Colombia	13.00	
7	Susana Diez	Argentina	12.29	
8	Berenice da Silva	Uruguay	12.05	
9	Fulvia Benegas	Paraguay	11.48	

=== Discus throw ===
30 September

Rank	Name	Nationality	Result	Notes
1st place, gold medalist(s)	Odete Domingos	Brazil	49.30	
2nd place, silver medalist(s)	María Isabel Urrutia	Colombia	45.00	
3rd place, bronze medalist(s)	Maria Fernandes	Brazil	44.72	
4	Yunaira Piña	Venezuela	43.72	
5	Gloria Martínez	Chile	43.40	
6	Susana Diez	Argentina	42.86	
7	Alejandra Herrera	Argentina	41.24	
8	Jazmín Cirio	Chile	37.34	
9	Fulvia Benegas	Paraguay	30.02	

=== Javelin throw ===
29 September – Old model

Rank	Name	Nationality	Result	Notes
1st place, gold medalist(s)	Marieta Riera	Venezuela	51.04	CR
2nd place, silver medalist(s)	Carolina Weil	Chile	50.68	
3rd place, bronze medalist(s)	Mariela Riera	Venezuela	49.18	
4	Mônica Rocha	Brazil	48.60	
5	Olga Verissimo	Brazil	42.58	
6	Estela Echagüe	Argentina	41.30	
7	Sonia Favre	Argentina	39.64	
8	Lucy Agüero	Paraguay	38.52	

=== Heptathlon ===
1–2 October – 1962 tables (1985 conversions given with *)

The highest mark recorded in each event is highlighted in yellow

Rank	Athlete	Nationality	100m H	HJ	SP	200m	LJ	JT	800m	Points	Conv.	Notes
1st place, gold medalist(s)	Conceição Geremias	Brazil	14.0	1.78	12.88	24.7	5.74	38.56	2:30.2	5865	5610*	CR
2nd place, silver medalist(s)	Olga Verissimo	Brazil	14.7	1.66	11.35	26.5	5.36	41.58	2:24.1	5371	5135*	
3rd place, bronze medalist(s)	Yvonne Neddermann	Argentina	14.8	1.63	11.40	26.6	5.54	36.64	2:25.2	5273	5022*	
4	Paola Raab	Chile	14.7	1.66	9.77	25.5	5.56	33.54	2:25.1	5251	5007*	
5	Ana María Comaschi	Argentina	15.0	1.51	11.80	25.7	4.81	34.66	2:29.4	4968	4665*	
6	María Esther Mediano	Chile	14.9	1.63	9.94	26.9	5.04	26.98	2:38.8	4711	4397*	
7	Marta García	Paraguay	20.7	1.30	8.82	28.7	4.37	25.26	2:51.2	3354	2883*	
