= Tito Steiner =

Paraguayan-Argentine decathlete (1952–2024)

Medal record

Athletics

Representing Argentina
Silver medal – second place	1982 Santa Fe	Shot put

Tito Steiner (1 May 1952 – 2 May 2024) was a Paraguayan-Argentine decathlete who represented Argentina in the 1970s and 1980s. He is the current Argentine record holder in the event.

== Career ==
Steiner set a national record in 1981, collecting 8,279 points at a meet in Baton Rouge, United States (1981-06-03). He bested this with a score of 8,291 points, set on 23 June 1983, which is still the national record. Steiner won the silver medal at the 1979 Pan American Games in San Juan, Puerto Rico.

Steiner finished fourth at the 1975 Pan American Games and 22nd at the Montreal 1976 Summer Olympics. In 1977, while competing for Brigham Young University he earned All-American honors and the NCAA title with a score of 7,659 points. He went on to win the honor three more times, a rare athlete to achieve All-American all four competitive years. He set the national record while winning the Texas Relays in 1979, defeating the meet record by C.K. Yang. He later improved upon the record in 1983 at Provo, but the meet was hand timed, common for all but the top level decathlons of that era. Decades later, hand timed marks are not as respected as fully automatic timing.

== Death ==
Steiner died from pneumonia on 2 May 2024, at the age of 72.

== International competitions ==
Year	Competition	Venue	Position	Event	Notes
Representing Argentina
1974	South American Championships	Santiago, Chile	2nd	Decathlon	6964 pts
1975	South American Championships	Rio de Janeiro, Brazil	5th	110 m hurdles	15.1 s
1975	South American Championships	Rio de Janeiro, Brazil	1st	Decathlon	7615 pts
1975	Pan American Games	Mexico City, Mexico	8th (h)	110 m hurdles	14.64 s
1975	Pan American Games	Mexico City, Mexico	9th	Shot put	15.18 m
1975	Pan American Games	Mexico City, Mexico	4th	Decathlon	7572 pts
1976	Olympic Games	Montreal, Canada	22nd	Decathlon	7052 pts
1977	South American Championships	Montevideo, Uruguay	6th (h)	110 m hurdles	16.0 s
1977	South American Championships	Montevideo, Uruguay	2nd	Pole vault	4.30 m
1977	South American Championships	Montevideo, Uruguay	1st	Decathlon	7411 pts
1979	Pan American Games	San Juan, Puerto Rico	2nd	Decathlon	7638 pts
1979	South American Championships	Bucaramanga, Colombia	2nd	Pole vault	4.60 m
1981	South American Championships	La Paz, Bolivia	–	Decathlon	DNF
1982	Southern Cross Games	Santa Fe, Argentina	2nd	Shot put	15.29 m
1982	Southern Cross Games	Santa Fe, Argentina	4th	Discus throw	46.10 m
1983	Pan American Games	Caracas, Venezuela	–	Decathlon	DNF
1983	South American Championships	Santa Fe, Argentina	4th	Decathlon	6617 pts
