= Francisco Figueredo =

Paraguayan middle-distance runner (1960–2019)

Personal information
- Full name: Francisco Concepción Figueredo Caballero
- Nationality: Paraguayan
- Born: 12 August 1960
- Died: 14 October 2019 (aged 59) Villa Elisa, Paraguay
- Height: 1.72 m (5 ft 8 in)
- Weight: 62 kg (137 lb)

Sport
- Sport: Middle-distance running
- Events: 800 metres, 1500 metres

Francisco Concepción Figueredo Caballero (12 August 1960 – 14 October 2019) was a Paraguayan middle-distance runner. He competed in the men's 800 metres at the 1984 Summer Olympics and has the Paraguayan national record in the same distance, set in 1:50.17. He died after being struck by a truck in 2019.

== International competitions ==
Year	Competition	Venue	Position	Event	Notes
Representing Paraguay
1982	Southern Cross Games	Santa Fe, Argentina	8th	1500 m	3:59.00
1983	South American Championships	Santa Fe, Argentina	8th	800 m	1:53.6
1983	South American Championships	Santa Fe, Argentina	9th	1500 m	4:01.2
1983	South American Championships	Santa Fe, Argentina	5th	4 × 400 m relay	NT
1984	Olympic Games	Los Angeles, United States	48th (h)	800 m	1:52.22
1985	South American Championships	Santiago, Chile	10th	800 m	1:58.58
1987	Pan American Games	Indianapolis, United States	14th (sf)	800 m	1:53.44
1987	Pan American Games	Indianapolis, United States	10th	1500 m	3:54.91
1987	South American Championships	São Paulo, Brazil	6th	800 m	1:51.69
1987	South American Championships	São Paulo, Brazil	8th	1500 m	3:54.18
1987	South American Championships	São Paulo, Brazil	7th	4 × 400 m relay	3:22.00
1990	Ibero-American Championships	Manaus, Brazil	8th	1500 m	3:53.19

== Personal bests ==
- 800 metres – 1:50.17 (1987)
