= Angel Gagliano =

Argentine athlete (born 1950)

Personal information
- Full name: Angel Carlos Gagliano
- Born: 6 April 1950 Mendoza, Argentina
- Died: 13 February 2025 (aged 74)
- Height: 1.82 m (6 ft 0 in)
- Weight: 79 kg (174 lb)

Sport
- Sport: Athletics
- Event: Triple jump

Angel Carlos Gagliano (6 April 1950 – 13 February 2025) was an Argentine athlete who competed primarily in the triple jump. He won multiple medals at continental level.

He was selected to represent Argentina at the 1984 Summer Olympics, however, he injured himself during warm-up and did not start.

== International competitions ==
Year	Competition	Venue	Position	Event	Notes
Representing Argentina
1971	South American Championships	Lima, Peru	8th	Triple jump	13.55 m
1975	South American Championships	Rio de Janeiro, Brazil	8th	Long jump	6.38 m
1975	South American Championships	Rio de Janeiro, Brazil	4th	Triple jump	15.07 m
1977	South American Championships	Montevideo, Uruguay	5th	4 × 400 m relay	3:24.2
1977	South American Championships	Montevideo, Uruguay	2nd	Triple jump	15.15 m
1978	Southern Cross Games	La Paz, Bolivia	3rd	4 × 100 m relay	41.05 s
1978	Southern Cross Games	La Paz, Bolivia	2nd	4 × 400 m relay	3:18.73
1978	Southern Cross Games	La Paz, Bolivia	5th	Long jump	6.73 m
1978	Southern Cross Games	La Paz, Bolivia	2nd	Triple jump	15.66 m
1979	South American Championships	Bucaramanga, Colombia	3rd	4 × 100 m relay	40.4 s
1979	South American Championships	Bucaramanga, Colombia	2nd	4 × 400 m relay	3:10.5
1979	South American Championships	Bucaramanga, Colombia	4th	Triple jump	15.75 m
1981	South American Championships	La Paz, Bolivia	6th	400 m	49.9 s
1981	South American Championships	La Paz, Bolivia	5th	4 × 100 m relay	41.9 s
1981	South American Championships	La Paz, Bolivia	3rd	4 × 400 m relay	3:12.2
1981	South American Championships	La Paz, Bolivia	3rd	Triple jump	15.95 m
1982	Southern Cross Games	Santa Fe, Argentina	2nd	Triple jump	15.19 m
1983	Ibero-American Championships	Barcelona, Spain	4th	Long jump	6.79 m
1983	Ibero-American Championships	Barcelona, Spain	4th	Triple jump	15.48 m
1983	South American Championships	Santa Fe, Argentina	4th	Triple jump	15.43 m
1985	South American Championships	Santiago, Chile	5th	Triple jump	14.87 m

== Personal bests ==
Outdoor

- 200 metres – 21.6h A (Mexico City 1980)
- 400 metres – 48.67 (Ciudad Bolívar 1981)
- 400 metres – 48.1h (Montevideo 1979)
- Long jump – 7.50 A (Mexico City 1980)
- Triple jump – 16.30 A (Las Cuevas 1983 – former NR)
