= Athletics at the 1982 Southern Cross Games – Results =

These are the full results of the athletics competition at the 1982 Southern Cross Games (later South American Games) which took place between 1 and 4 December 1982, in Santa Fe, Argentina.

== Men's results ==
=== 100 meters ===
2 December

Wind: -2.8 m/s

Rank	Name	Nationality	Time	Notes
1st place, gold medalist(s)	Luis Alberto Schneider	Chile	10.87	
2nd place, silver medalist(s)	Hugo Alzamora	Argentina	10.91	
3rd place, bronze medalist(s)	Marcelo Urquiza	Chile	11.01	
4	Gustavo Capart	Argentina	11.06	
5	Luis Cabral	Uruguay	11.15	
6	Ronald Raborg	Peru	11.21	
7	Ricardo Arrúa	Paraguay	11.21	
8	Luis Villalba	Paraguay	11.42	

=== 200 meters ===
4 December

Wind: -1.9 m/s

Rank	Name	Nationality	Time	Notes
1st place, gold medalist(s)	Luis Alberto Schneider	Chile	21.28	GR
2nd place, silver medalist(s)	Gustavo Capart	Argentina	21.58	
3rd place, bronze medalist(s)	Ernesto Braun	Argentina	21.84	
4	Luis Cabral	Uruguay	21.89	
5	Juan Carlos Fuentes	Chile	21.96	
6	Mario Pearson	Paraguay	22.33	
7	Ricardo Arrúa	Paraguay	22.88	

=== 400 meters ===
4 December

Rank	Name	Nationality	Time	Notes
1st place, gold medalist(s)	Pablo Squella	Chile	47.47	GR
2nd place, silver medalist(s)	Daniel Bambicha	Argentina	48.20	
3rd place, bronze medalist(s)	Ruben Da Cunha	Uruguay	49.07	
4	Alfredo Edwards	Chile	49.09	
5	Ricardo Biojo	Colombia	49.36	
6	Gabriel Castellá	Argentina	49.76	
7	Jorge Cotito	Peru	50.41	
8	Gabriel Díaz	Uruguay	50.94	

=== 800 meters ===
4 December

Rank	Name	Nationality	Time	Notes
1st place, gold medalist(s)	Manuel Ramírez	Colombia	1:50.10	GR
2nd place, silver medalist(s)	Emilio Ulloa	Chile	1:50.12	
3rd place, bronze medalist(s)	Raúl López	Argentina	1:51.45	
4	Luis Migueles	Argentina	1:52.89	
5	Abel Godoy	Uruguay	1:54.27	
6	Luis Ulloa	Chile	1:58.19	
7	Vicente Medina	Paraguay	1:58.52	
8	Edwin Lobatón	Bolivia	2:06.20	

=== 1500 meters ===
2 December

Rank	Name	Nationality	Time	Notes
1st place, gold medalist(s)	Emilio Ulloa	Chile	3:46.70	GR
2nd place, silver medalist(s)	Ricardo Vera	Uruguay	3:48.85	
3rd place, bronze medalist(s)	Abel Godoy	Uruguay	3:49.06	
4	Jaime Vergara	Chile	3:49.50	
5	Sigfrido Romero	Colombia	3:50.10	
6	Omar Ortega	Argentina	3:54.77	
7	Juan Carlos Alaniz	Argentina	3:59.66	
8	Francisco Figueredo	Paraguay	3:59.00 (?)	

=== 5000 meters ===
1 December

Rank	Name	Nationality	Time	Notes
1st place, gold medalist(s)	Ricardo Vera	Uruguay	14:07.4	GR
2nd place, silver medalist(s)	Alejandro Silva	Chile	14:09.0	
3rd place, bronze medalist(s)	Omar Ortega	Argentina	14:10.1	
4	Omar Aguilar	Chile	14:24.7	
5	Carlos Castro	Argentina	14:30.2	
6	Jhonny Pérez	Bolivia	14:30.2	
7	Mauricio Cadavid	Colombia	15:00.0	
8	Marcial Congo	Paraguay	16:09.6	

=== 10,000 meters ===
2 December

Rank	Name	Nationality	Time	Notes
1st place, gold medalist(s)	Alejandro Silva	Chile	29:35.9	GR
2nd place, silver medalist(s)	Luis Tipán	Ecuador	29:47.0	
3rd place, bronze medalist(s)	Omar Aguilar	Chile	29:55.6	
4	Freddy Báez	Bolivia	30:17.2	
5	Carlos Castro	Argentina	30:19.7	
6	Félix Rivedieu	Uruguay	30:21.7	
7	Rubén Huerga	Argentina	30:59.5	

=== Marathon ===
4 December

Rank	Name	Nationality	Time	Notes
1st place, gold medalist(s)	Alfredo Maravilla	Argentina	2:26:45	GR
2nd place, silver medalist(s)	Luis Tipán	Ecuador	2:27:00	
3rd place, bronze medalist(s)	Carlos Carvajal	Chile	2:30:00	
4	Carlos Orue	Argentina	2:32:00	
5	Rufino Chávez	Bolivia	2:32:50	
6	Freddy Báez	Bolivia	2:44:24	
7	Marcial Congo	Paraguay	2:46:20	

=== 110 meters hurdles ===
4 December

Wind: -4.7 m/s

Rank	Name	Nationality	Time	Notes
1st place, gold medalist(s)	Juan Carlos Fuentes	Chile	15.15	
2nd place, silver medalist(s)	Javier Olivar	Uruguay	15.27	
3rd place, bronze medalist(s)	Andrés Lyon	Chile	15.28	
4	Eduardo Beck	Argentina	15.40	
5	Rodolfo Iturraspe	Argentina	16.55	

=== 400 meters hurdles ===
2 December

Rank	Name	Nationality	Time	Notes
1st place, gold medalist(s)	Pablo Squella	Chile	50.81	GR
2nd place, silver medalist(s)	Ricardo Biojo	Colombia	52.16	
3rd place, bronze medalist(s)	Javier Olivar	Uruguay	52.50	
4	Jorge Díaz	Argentina	52.80	
5	Alfredo Edwards	Chile	53.20	
6	Carlos Varas	Argentina	55.47	

=== 3000 meters steeplechase ===
3 December

Rank	Name	Nationality	Time	Notes
1st place, gold medalist(s)	Emilio Ulloa	Chile	8:50.6	GR
2nd place, silver medalist(s)	Luis Palma	Chile	8:56.4	
3rd place, bronze medalist(s)	Sigfrido Romero	Colombia	9:06.0	
4	Johnny Pérez	Bolivia	9:10.5	
5	Norberto Limonta	Argentina	9:24.8	
6	Diego Zarba	Argentina	9:26.0	

=== 4 × 100 meters relay ===
4 December

Rank	Nation	Competitors	Time	Notes
1st place, gold medalist(s)	Chile	Mauricio Urquiza, Francisco Pichot, Juan Carlos Fuentes, Luis Alberto Schneider	41.00	
2nd place, silver medalist(s)	Peru	Jorge Cotito, Ronald Raborg, Enrique Goytisolo, Mirko Kuljevan	43.00	

=== 4 × 400 meters relay ===
2 December

Rank	Nation	Competitors	Time	Notes
1st place, gold medalist(s)	Chile	Juan Carlos Fuentes, Alfredo Edwards, Luis Alberto Schneider, Pablo Squella	3:11.65	GR
2nd place, silver medalist(s)	Argentina	Jorge Díaz, Raúl López, Gabriel Castellà, Daniel Bambicha	3:13.99	
3rd place, bronze medalist(s)	Uruguay	Gabriel Díaz, Javier Olivar, Luis Cabral, Rubén da Cunha	3:19.57	

=== 20 kilometers walk ===
3 December

Rank	Name	Nationality	Time	Notes
1st place, gold medalist(s)	Osvaldo Morejón	Bolivia	1:37:06	GR
2nd place, silver medalist(s)	Jorge Yannone	Argentina	1:38:01	
3rd place, bronze medalist(s)	Esteban Quelale	Bolivia	1:38:12	
4	Rito Molina	Argentina	1:44:50	

=== High jump ===
4 December

Rank	Name	Nationality	Result	Notes
1st place, gold medalist(s)	Fernando Pastoriza	Argentina	2.03	
2nd place, silver medalist(s)	Joaquín del Real	Chile	2.03	
3rd place, bronze medalist(s)	Horacio Acevedo	Argentina	2.00	

=== Pole vault ===
3 December

Rank	Name	Nationality	Result	Notes
1st place, gold medalist(s)	Fernando Hoces	Chile	4.80	GR
2nd place, silver medalist(s)	Fernando Ruocco	Uruguay	4.80	GR
3rd place, bronze medalist(s)	Marcelo Cibie	Chile	4.50	
4	Guillermo Chiaraviglio	Argentina	4.50	
5	Oscar Veit	Argentina	4.40	
6	Enrique Goytisolo	Peru	4.00	

=== Long jump ===
2 December

Rank	Name	Nationality	Result	Notes
1st place, gold medalist(s)	Francisco Pichott	Chile	7.44	
2nd place, silver medalist(s)	Eduardo Labalta	Argentina	7.17	
3rd place, bronze medalist(s)	Mirko Kuljevan	Peru	7.06	
4	Marcelo Abásolo	Chile	6.88	
5	Ronald Raborg	Peru	6.79	
6	Óscar Diesel	Paraguay	6.73	
7	Marcelo Alarcón	Argentina	6.62	

=== Triple jump ===
1 December

Rank	Name	Nationality	Result	Notes
1st place, gold medalist(s)	Francisco Pichott	Chile	15.73w	
2nd place, silver medalist(s)	Angel Gagliano	Argentina	15.19w	
3rd place, bronze medalist(s)	Jorge Mazzeo	Argentina	15.07w	
4	Óscar Diesel	Paraguay	15.02	

=== Shot put ===
2 December

Rank	Name	Nationality	Result	Notes
1st place, gold medalist(s)	Gert Weil	Chile	17.37	GR
2nd place, silver medalist(s)	Tito Steiner	Argentina	15.29	
3rd place, bronze medalist(s)	Gerardo Carucci	Argentina	15.12	

=== Discus throw ===
3 December

Rank	Name	Nationality	Result	Notes
1st place, gold medalist(s)	Carlos Bryner	Argentina	50.26	GR
2nd place, silver medalist(s)	Gert Weil	Chile	47.90	
3rd place, bronze medalist(s)	Alejandro Serrano	Chile	47.60	
4	Tito Steiner	Argentina	46.10	
5	Claudio Escauriza	Paraguay	44.14	

=== Hammer throw ===
1 December

Rank	Name	Nationality	Result	Notes
1st place, gold medalist(s)	Daniel Gómez	Argentina	56.24	
2nd place, silver medalist(s)	Ernesto Iglesias	Argentina	53.40	
3rd place, bronze medalist(s)	Gert Weil	Chile	35.08	
4	Marcos Talavera	Paraguay	20.62	

=== Javelin throw ===
4 December – old model

Rank	Name	Nationality	Result	Notes
1st place, gold medalist(s)	Luis Lucumí	Colombia	77.98	GR
2nd place, silver medalist(s)	Juan Francisco Garmendia	Argentina	76.12	
3rd place, bronze medalist(s)	Antar Martínez	Colombia	68.70	
4	Fernando Espíndola	Argentina	65.14	
5	Carlos González	Uruguay	59.36	
6	Marcos Talavera	Paraguay	54.38	

=== Decathlon ===
1–2 December – 1962 tables (1985 conversions given with *)

The highest mark recorded in each event is highlighted in yellow

Rank	Athlete	Nationality	100m	LJ	SP	HJ	400m	110m H	DT	PV	JT	1500m	Points	Conv.	Notes
1st place, gold medalist(s)	Carlos Gambetta	Argentina	11.0	7.24w	13.53	2.13	48.6	17.0	35.90	4.20	52.28	5:20.2	7103	7101*	GR
2nd place, silver medalist(s)	Claudio Escauriza	Paraguay	11.6	6.96	13.04	1.80	52.4	18.0	43.40	4.45	61.56	5:02.3	6774	6771*	
3rd place, bronze medalist(s)	Hugo Giménez	Argentina	11.6	6.42w	12.02	1.89	50.2	16.8	29.68	3.50	43.04	4:45.0	6168	6174*	

== Women's results ==
=== 100 meters ===
4 December

Wind: -1.1 m/s

Rank	Name	Nationality	Time	Notes
1st place, gold medalist(s)	Carmela Bolívar	Peru	12.40	
2nd place, silver medalist(s)	Leslie Cooper	Chile	12.55	
3rd place, bronze medalist(s)	Carla Herencia	Chile	12.72	
4	Brigitte Winter	Peru	12.88	
5	Graciela Palacín	Argentina	13.00	
6	Gabriela García	Argentina	13.05	
7	Graciela Maidana	Paraguay	13.24	

=== 200 meters ===
Heats – 2 December
Wind:
Heat 1: -2.4 m/s, Heat 2: -1.2 m/s

Rank	Heat	Name	Nationality	Time	Notes
1	2	Margarita Grun	Uruguay	24.74	Q
2	2	Daisy Salas	Chile	25.25	Q
3	2	Carmela Bolívar	Peru	25.29	Q
4	1	Eucaris Caicedo	Colombia	25.34	Q
5	1	Carla Herencia	Chile	25.91	Q
6	2	Susana Jenkins	Argentina	26.28	q
7	1	Graciela Palacín	Argentina	26.54	Q
8	1	Brigitte Winter	Peru	26.76	q
9	1	Graciela Maidana	Paraguay	27.04	

Final – 2 December

NWI

Rank	Name	Nationality	Time	Notes
1st place, gold medalist(s)	Eucaris Caicedo	Colombia	24.48	
2nd place, silver medalist(s)	Margarita Grun	Uruguay	24.70	
3rd place, bronze medalist(s)	Carmela Bolívar	Peru	24.99	
4	Daisy Salas	Chile	25.29	
5	Carla Herencia	Chile	25.32	
6	Graciela Palacín	Argentina	25.85	
7	Susana Jenkins	Argentina	25.94	
8	Brigitte Winter	Peru	26.26	

=== 400 meters ===
4 December

Rank	Name	Nationality	Time	Notes
1st place, gold medalist(s)	Eucaris Caicedo	Colombia	54.21	GR
2nd place, silver medalist(s)	Margarita Grun	Uruguay	54.84	
3rd place, bronze medalist(s)	Cecilia Rodríguez	Chile	56.19	
4	Marcela López	Argentina	57.04	
5	Amalia Linietzki	Argentina	58.44	
6	Graciela Maidana	Paraguay	1:01.1	

=== 800 meters ===
4 December

Rank	Name	Nationality	Time	Notes
1st place, gold medalist(s)	Liliana Góngora	Argentina	2:09.06	GR
2nd place, silver medalist(s)	Norfalia Carabalí	Colombia	2:11.55	
3rd place, bronze medalist(s)	Silvia Augusburger	Argentina	2:11.78	
4	Marcela Arriagada	Chile	2:12.84	
5	Graciela Mardones	Chile	2:22.49	
6	Gladys De Giúdici	Paraguay	2:24.02	

=== 1500 meters ===
1 December

Rank	Name	Nationality	Time	Notes
1st place, gold medalist(s)	Liliana Góngora	Argentina	4:25.92	GR
2nd place, silver medalist(s)	Mónica Regonesi	Chile	4:29.19	
3rd place, bronze medalist(s)	Marcela Arriagada	Chile	4:34.06	
4	Analía Collazzo	Argentina	4:39.16	
5	Marcia Chiliquinga	Ecuador	4:40.08	
6	Norfalia Carabalí	Colombia	4:51.65	
7	Paola Patrón	Uruguay	4:55.00	
8	Gladys De Giúdici	Paraguay	5:11.55	

=== 3000 meters ===
4 December

Rank	Name	Nationality	Time	Notes
1st place, gold medalist(s)	Mónica Regonesi	Chile	9:53.9	GR
2nd place, silver medalist(s)	Marcia Chiliquinga	Ecuador	10:04.5	
3rd place, bronze medalist(s)	Sonia Molina	Argentina	10:12.5	
4	Stella Selles	Argentina	10:17.4	
5	Paola Patrón	Uruguay	10:26.6	

=== 100 meters hurdles ===
4 December

Wind: -1.8 m/s

Rank	Name	Nationality	Time	Notes
1st place, gold medalist(s)	Beatriz Capotosto	Argentina	13.75	GR
2nd place, silver medalist(s)	Susana Jenkins	Argentina	14.90	
3rd place, bronze medalist(s)	Nadya Katich	Colombia	15.15	
4	Patricia Deck	Chile	15.20	
5	Valentina Bahamondes	Chile	16.25	

=== 400 meters hurdles ===
2 December

Rank	Name	Nationality	Time	Notes
1st place, gold medalist(s)	Anabella dal Lago	Argentina	1:02.20	GR
2nd place, silver medalist(s)	Valentina Bahamondes	Chile	1:03.37	

=== 4 × 100 meters relay ===
4 December

Rank	Nation	Competitors	Time	Notes
1st place, gold medalist(s)	Argentina	Hilda Márquez, Susana Jenkins, Graciela Palacín, Beatriz Capotosto	47.1	
2nd place, silver medalist(s)	Chile	Cecilia Rodríguez, Carla Herencia, Daisy Salas, Leslie Cooper	47.3	
3rd place, bronze medalist(s)	Colombia	María Isabel Urrutia, Norfalia Carabalí, Nadia Katich, Eucaris Caicedo	49.3	

=== 4 × 400 meters relay ===
2 December

Rank	Nation	Competitors	Time	Notes
1st place, gold medalist(s)	Chile	Carla Herencia, Paola Raab, Graciela Mardones, Cecilia Rodríguez	3:45.74	GR
2nd place, silver medalist(s)	Argentina	Amalia Linietzky, Silvia Augsburger, Anabella dal Lago, Marcela López	3:46.26	

=== High jump ===
1 December

Rank	Name	Nationality	Result	Notes
1st place, gold medalist(s)	Andrea Sassi	Uruguay	1.70	
2nd place, silver medalist(s)	Carmen Garib	Chile	1.70	
3rd place, bronze medalist(s)	Mónica Halporn	Argentina	1.65	
4	Claudia MacAllister	Argentina	1.65	
5	María Estehr Mediano	Chile	1.60	

=== Long jump ===
3 December

Rank	Name	Nationality	Result	Notes
1st place, gold medalist(s)	Araceli Bruschini	Argentina	5.85w	
2nd place, silver medalist(s)	Graciela Acosta	Uruguay	5.83w	
3rd place, bronze medalist(s)	Andrea Sassi	Uruguay	5.54w	
4	María Esther Mediano	Chile	5.52w	
5	Nadya Katich	Colombia	5.42w	
6	Carmen Garib	Chile	5.26w	
7	Anabella dal Lago	Argentina	5.02	

=== Shot put ===
4 December

Rank	Name	Nationality	Result	Notes
1st place, gold medalist(s)	María Isabel Urrutia	Colombia	13.27	GR
2nd place, silver medalist(s)	Jazmín Cirio	Chile	13.18	
3rd place, bronze medalist(s)	Alejandra Bevacqua	Argentina	12.71	
4	Susana Diez	Argentina	12.22	
5	Carolina Kittsteiner	Chile	11.61	

=== Discus throw ===
4 December

Rank	Name	Nationality	Result	Notes
1st place, gold medalist(s)	María Isabel Urrutia	Colombia	44.84	GR
2nd place, silver medalist(s)	Gloria Martínez	Chile	44.22	
3rd place, bronze medalist(s)	Elizabeth Martínez	Argentina	39.90	
4	Susana Diez	Argentina	38.82	
5	Jazmín Cirio	Chile	38.14	

=== Javelin throw ===
1 December – old model

Rank	Name	Nationality	Result	Notes
1st place, gold medalist(s)	Patricia Guerrero	Peru	49.32	GR
2nd place, silver medalist(s)	Ana María Campillay	Argentina	46.22	
3rd place, bronze medalist(s)	Carolina Kittsteiner	Chile	46.20	
4	Sonia Favre	Argentina	38.40	

=== Heptathlon ===
3–4 December – 1985 tables

The highest mark recorded in each event is highlighted in yellow

Rank	Athlete	Nationality	100m H	HJ	SP	200m	LJ	JT	800m	Points	Notes
1st place, gold medalist(s)	Paola Raab	Chile	15.57	1.60	9.30	25.6	5.47	31.28	2:24.5	4754	GR
2nd place, silver medalist(s)	Ana María Comaschi	Argentina	15.66	1.50	11.15	26.0	5.20w	33.02	2:31.5	4580	
3rd place, bronze medalist(s)	María Esther Mediano	Chile	16.40	1.65	9.06	26.6	5.57w	32.04	2:33.4	4540	
4	Elina Urbano	Argentina	16.79	1.60	11.20	29.8	4.94	36.18	2:38.8	4353	
5	Olga Cabrera	Paraguay	19.20	1.40	9.95	29.4	4.78	31.40	2:44.9	3439	
