= Fernando Pastoriza =

Argentine high jumper

Personal information
- Full name: Fernando Julio Pastoriza
- Nationality: Argentine
- Born: 1 February 1965 (age 61)
- Height: 1.84 m (6 ft 0 in)
- Weight: 70 kg (154 lb)

Sport
- Sport: Athletics
- Events: High jump, pole vault
- Club: Capital Federal

Fernando Julio Pastoriza (born 1 February 1965) is an Argentine athlete who specialised in the high jump and pole vault. He competed in the men's high jump at the 1988 Summer Olympics.

His personal bests are 2.25 metres in the high jump (Mexico 1988, NR) and 5.10 metres in the pole vault (Lisbon 1993).

== International competitions ==
Year	Competition	Venue	Position	Event	Notes
Representing Argentina
1981	South American Junior Championships	Rio de Janeiro, Brazil	2nd	High jump	2.09 m
1981	South American Championships	La Paz, Bolivia	4th	High jump	2.00 m
1982	Southern Cross Games	Santa Fe, Argentina	1st	High jump	2.03 m
1983	Pan American Games	Caracas, Venezuela	7th	High jump	2.14 m
1983	Ibero-American Championships	Barcelona, Spain	4th	High jump	2.09 m
1983	South American Championships	Santa Fe, Argentina	2nd	High jump	2.14 m
1984	Pan American Junior Championships	Nassau, Bahamas	3rd	High jump	2.10 m
1984	Pan American Junior Championships	Nassau, Bahamas	8th	Pole vault	4.27 m
1984	South American Junior Championships	Caracas, Venezuela	2nd	High jump	2.09 m
1984	South American Junior Championships	Caracas, Venezuela	1st	Pole vault	4.30 m
1985	South American Championships	Santiago, Chile	2nd	High jump	2.11 m
1986	Ibero-American Championships	Havana, Cuba	4th	High jump	2.15 m
1986	Ibero-American Championships	Havana, Cuba	5th	Pole vault	4.70 m
1986	South American Games	Santiago, Chile	1st	High jump	2.15 m
1987	Pan American Games	Indianapolis, United States	–	High jump	NM
1987	Pan American Games	Indianapolis, United States	6th	Pole vault	4.60 m
1987	South American Championships	São Paulo, Brazil	2nd	High jump	2.17 m
1988	Ibero-American Championships	Mexico City, Mexico	3rd	High jump	2.25 m
1988	Olympic Games	Seoul, South Korea	26th (q)	High jump	2.10 m
1991	South American Championships	Manaus, Brazil	6th	High jump	2.05 m
1991	South American Championships	Manaus, Brazil	4th	Pole vault	4.60 m
1992	Ibero-American Championships	Seville, Spain	11th	Pole vault	4.60 m
1993	South American Championships	Lima, Peru	2nd	Pole vault	4.80 m
1994	Ibero-American Championships	Mar del Plata, Argentina	5th	Pole vault	4.90 m
1995	Pan American Games	Mar del Plata, Argentina	8th	Pole vault	5.00 m
1995	South American Championships	Manaus, Brazil	–	Pole vault	NM
1996	Ibero-American Championships	Medellín, Colombia	5th	Pole vault	4.70 m
1997	South American Championships	Mar del Plata, Argentina	2nd	Pole vault	4.80 m
