= 1981 South American Championships in Athletics – Results =

These are the results of the 1981 South American Championships in Athletics which took place at the Estadio Olímpico Hernando Siles in La Paz, Bolivia, between 5 and 8 November.

== Men's results ==
=== 100 metres ===
Heats – 5 November

Rank	Heat	Name	Nationality	Time	Notes
1	1	Luis Alberto Schneider	Chile	10.2	Q
2	1	Altevir de Araújo	Brazil	10.2	Q
3	1	Giorgio Mautino	Peru	10.4	Q
4	1	Yamil Manzur	Bolivia	10.5	q
5	1	Hugo Alzamora	Argentina	10.6	
6	1	Fabio García	Colombia	10.6	
1	2	Katsuiko Nakaia	Brazil	10.2	Q
2	2	Marco Mautino	Peru	10.4	Q
3	2	Héctor Fernández	Chile	10.5	Q
4	2	Nicolás Glass	Argentina	10.5	q
5	2	Marco Luque	Bolivia	10.7	

Final – 6 November

Rank	Name	Nationality	Time	Notes
1st place, gold medalist(s)	Katsuiko Nakaia	Brazil	10.1	=CR
2nd place, silver medalist(s)	Altevir de Araújo	Brazil	10.3	
3rd place, bronze medalist(s)	Luis Alberto Schneider	Chile	10.3	
4	Marco Mautino	Peru	10.3	
5	Giorgio Mautino	Peru	10.6	
6	Héctor Fernández	Chile	10.6	
7	Nicolás Glass	Argentina	10.6	
8	Yamil Manzur	Bolivia	10.6	

=== 200 metres ===
Heats – 7 November

Rank	Heat	Name	Nationality	Time	Notes
1	1	Héctor Daley	Panama	20.4	Q
2	1	Luis Alberto Schneider	Chile	20.8	Q
3	1	Altevir de Araújo	Brazil	21.1	q
4	1	Nicolás Glass	Argentina	21.2	q
5	1	Giorgio Mautino	Peru	21.2	
6	1	Fabio García	Colombia	21.4	
7	1	Yamil Manzur	Bolivia	21.9	
1	2	Paulo Roberto Correia	Brazil	20.7	Q
2	2	Marco Mautino	Peru	21.1	Q
3	2	Alfredo Muro	Argentina	21.2	
4	2	Héctor Fernández	Chile	21.4	
5	2	José Torrico	Bolivia	21.5	
6	2	Víctor Guijarro	Ecuador	22.5	

Final – 8 November

Rank	Name	Nationality	Time	Notes
1st place, gold medalist(s)	Paulo Roberto Correia	Brazil	20.2	CR, PB
2nd place, silver medalist(s)	Héctor Daley	Panama	20.5	
3rd place, bronze medalist(s)	Luis Alberto Schneider	Chile	20.5	
4	Altevir de Araújo	Brazil	21.2	
5	Marco Mautino	Peru	21.6	
6	Nicolás Glass	Argentina	21.7	

=== 400 metres ===
Heats – 7 November

Rank	Heat	Name	Nationality	Time	Notes
1	1	Gérson de Souza	Brazil	48.6	Q
2	1	Angel Gagliano	Argentina	48.9	Q
3	1	Víctor Guijarro	Ecuador	51.2	
4	1	Dante Serrano	Bolivia	51.4	
1	2	Pablo Squella	Chile	48.0	Q
2	2	Geraldo Pegado	Brazil	48.2	Q
3	2	Jorge Díaz	Argentina	49.2	q
4	2	Aldo Tassi	Peru	49.9	q
5	2	Edgar Aguayo	Bolivia	50.8	

Final – 8 November

Rank	Name	Nationality	Time	Notes
1st place, gold medalist(s)	Geraldo Pegado	Brazil	46.8	
2nd place, silver medalist(s)	Gérson de Souza	Brazil	47.8	
3rd place, bronze medalist(s)	Pablo Squella	Chile	48.0	
4	Jorge Díaz	Argentina	48.5	
5	Aldo Tassi	Peru	49.6	
6	Angel Gagliano	Argentina	49.9	

=== 800 metres ===
Heats – 7 November

Rank	Heat	Name	Nationality	Time	Notes
1	1	Cristián Molina	Chile	1:59.4	Q
2	1	Wilson dos Santos	Brazil	2:00.0	Q
3	1	Pedro Cáceres	Argentina	2:00.1	q
4	1	Gustavo Paredes	Ecuador	2:00.4	
5	1	Ricardo Taborga	Bolivia	2:01.7	
1	2	Edwin Lobatón	Bolivia	1:57.0	Q
2	2	José Luíz Barbosa	Brazil	2:00.0	Q
3	2	Raúl López	Argentina	2:00.2	q
4	2	Jaime Punina	Ecuador	2:00.4	

Final – 8 November

Rank	Name	Nationality	Time	Notes
1st place, gold medalist(s)	Cristián Molina	Chile	1:53.6	
2nd place, silver medalist(s)	José Luíz Barbosa	Brazil	1:54.7	
3rd place, bronze medalist(s)	Wilson dos Santos	Brazil	1:55.9	
4	Pedro Cáceres	Argentina	1:56.4	
5	Edwin Lobatón	Bolivia	1:59.3	
	Raúl López	Argentina	?	

=== 1500 metres ===
6 November

Rank	Name	Nationality	Time	Notes
1st place, gold medalist(s)	Emilio Ulloa	Chile	4:07.1	
2nd place, silver medalist(s)	Jhonny Pérez	Bolivia	4:08.0	
3rd place, bronze medalist(s)	Jaime Punina	Ecuador	4:09.0	
4	Cosme do Nascimento	Brazil	4:10.0	
5	Freddy Báez	Bolivia	4:14.7	
6	Jorge Moya	Ecuador	4:19.7	
7	Omar Aguilar	Chile	4:22.2	

=== 5000 metres ===
5 November

Rank	Name	Nationality	Time	Notes
1st place, gold medalist(s)	Víctor Mora	Colombia	15:23.9	
2nd place, silver medalist(s)	Silvio Salazar	Colombia	15:51.4	
3rd place, bronze medalist(s)	Jhonny Pérez	Bolivia	15:59.4	
4	José João da Silva	Brazil	16:25.4	
5	Hugo Gavino	Peru	16:38.4	
6	Freddy Báez	Bolivia	16:57.6	
7	Juan Jofre	Chile	17:85.1	

=== 10,000 metres ===
8 November

Rank	Name	Nationality	Time	Notes
1st place, gold medalist(s)	Víctor Mora	Colombia	31:56.4	
2nd place, silver medalist(s)	Silvio Salazar	Colombia	32:57.1	
3rd place, bronze medalist(s)	Hugo Gavino	Peru	33:30.9	
4	Benedicto Aguilar	Bolivia	34:13.8	
5	Rufino Chávez	Bolivia	34:15.1	
6	Carlos Carvajal	Chile	34:46.4	

=== Half marathon ===
8 November

Rank	Name	Nationality	Time	Notes
1st place, gold medalist(s)	Víctor Mora	Colombia	1:10:42	
2nd place, silver medalist(s)	Alfonso Torres	Colombia	1:13:20	
3rd place, bronze medalist(s)	René Moldes	Bolivia	1:14:54	
4	Hugo Gavino	Peru	1:15:03	
5	Rufino Chávez	Bolivia	1:15:45	
6	Carlos Carvajal	Chile	1:16:47	
7	Julio Llanaga	Ecuador	1:32:50	

=== 110 metres hurdles ===
8 November

Rank	Name	Nationality	Time	Notes
1st place, gold medalist(s)	Juan Carlos Fuentes	Chile	14.2	
2nd place, silver medalist(s)	Wellington da Nóbrega	Brazil	14.4	
3rd place, bronze medalist(s)	Andrés Lyon	Chile	14.4	
4	Javier Olivar	Uruguay	14.5	
5	Rodolfo Iturraspe	Argentina	14.6	
6	Carlos dos Santos	Brazil	15.3	
7	Luis Ojeda	Peru	15.7	

=== 400 metres hurdles ===
6 November

Rank	Name	Nationality	Time	Notes
1st place, gold medalist(s)	Antônio Ferreira	Brazil	52.3	
2nd place, silver medalist(s)	Pablo Squella	Chile	52.7	
3rd place, bronze medalist(s)	Donizete Soares	Brazil	53.0	
4	Jorge Díaz	Argentina	53.3	
5	Rodolfo Iturraspe	Argentina	55.5	
6	Aldo Tassi	Peru	56.3	

=== 3000 metres steeplechase ===
7 November

Rank	Name	Nationality	Time	Notes
1st place, gold medalist(s)	Emilio Ulloa	Chile	9:53.2	
2nd place, silver medalist(s)	Jhonny Pérez	Bolivia	9:54.2	
3rd place, bronze medalist(s)	Elói Schleder	Brazil	10:19.8	
4	Luis Palma	Chile	10:27.8	
5	Luis Tipán	Ecuador	10:29.4	

=== 4 × 100 metres relay ===
8 November

Rank	Nation	Competitors	Time	Notes
1st place, gold medalist(s)	Brazil	Paulo Correia, Paulo Lima, Katsuhiko Nakaia, Altevir de Araújo	39.6	CR
2nd place, silver medalist(s)	Chile	Héctor Fernández, Juan Carlos Fuentes, Luis Alberto Schneider, Francisco Pichott	40.4	
3rd place, bronze medalist(s)	Peru	Ronald Raborg, Giorgio Mautino, José Luis Valverde, Marco Mautino	40.8	
4	Bolivia	Marco Luque, José Torrico, Mosteiro, Yamil Manzur	41.7	
5	Argentina	Alfredo Muro, Angel Gagliano, Hugo Alzamora, Nicolás Glass	41.9	

=== 4 × 400 metres relay ===
6 November

Rank	Nation	Competitors	Time	Notes
1st place, gold medalist(s)	Brazil	Agberto Guimarães, Geraldo Pegado, Gerson de Souza, José Luíz Barbosa	3:09.5	
2nd place, silver medalist(s)	Chile	Rodrigo Muñoz, Pablo Squella, Francisco Pichott, Emilio Ulloa	3:11.8	
3rd place, bronze medalist(s)	Argentina	Jorge Díaz, Nicolás Glass, Raúl López, Angel Gagliano	3:12.2	
4	Bolivia	Roberto Prado, Edgar Aguayo, Dante Serrano, José Torrico	3:20.3	

=== 20 kilometres walk ===
7 November

Rank	Name	Nationality	Time	Notes
1st place, gold medalist(s)	Oswaldo Morejón	Bolivia	1:51:22	
2nd place, silver medalist(s)	Ernesto Alfaro	Colombia	1:52:52	
3rd place, bronze medalist(s)	Waldemar da Silva	Brazil	1:53:10	
4	Enrique Peña	Colombia	1:56:34	
5	Wilson de Matos	Brazil	2:05:04	

=== High jump ===
8 November

Rank	Name	Nationality	Result	Notes
1st place, gold medalist(s)	Jorge Archanjo	Brazil	2.15	CR
2nd place, silver medalist(s)	Cláudio Freire	Brazil	2.10	
3rd place, bronze medalist(s)	Daniel Wolfberg	Chile	2.05	
4	Fernando Pastoriza	Argentina	2.00	
5	Jorge Mazzeo	Argentina	1.95	

=== Pole vault ===
7 November

Rank	Name	Nationality	Result	Notes
1st place, gold medalist(s)	Fernando Hoces	Chile	4.90	CR, NR
2nd place, silver medalist(s)	Fernando Ruocco	Uruguay	4.70	
3rd place, bronze medalist(s)	Renato Bortolocci	Brazil	4.60	
4	Guillermo Chiaraviglio	Argentina	4.50	
5	Flávio Ferreira	Brazil	4.20	

=== Long jump ===
6 November

Rank	Name	Nationality	Result	Notes
1st place, gold medalist(s)	Francisco Pichott	Chile	7.55	
2nd place, silver medalist(s)	Luís de Souza	Brazil	7.25	
3rd place, bronze medalist(s)	Cláudio Flores	Brazil	7.25	
4	Ronald Raborg	Peru	7.14	
5	Jorge Mazzeo	Argentina	7.08	
6	Eduardo Labalta	Argentina	7.02	
7	Henry Pastorelli	Peru	7.02	
8	Juan Cuellar	Bolivia	6.89	

=== Triple jump ===
5 November

Rank	Name	Nationality	Result	Notes
1st place, gold medalist(s)	João Carlos de Oliveira	Brazil	17.05	CR
2nd place, silver medalist(s)	Francisco Pichott	Chile	16.23	
3rd place, bronze medalist(s)	Angel Gagliano	Argentina	15.95	
4	Jorge Mazzeo	Argentina	15.48	
5	Cláudio Flores	Brazil	15.33	
6	Óscar Diesel	Paraguay	14.65	
7	Juan Cuellar	Bolivia	14.42	
8	Miguel Valdez	Peru	14.34	

=== Shot put ===
6 November

Rank	Name	Nationality	Result	Notes
1st place, gold medalist(s)	Gert Weil	Chile	17.48	
2nd place, silver medalist(s)	Juan Adolfo Turri	Argentina	16.54	
3rd place, bronze medalist(s)	José Carlos Jacques	Brazil	16.31	
4	João Lima	Brazil	15.34	
5	José Pérez	Chile	15.20	
6	Gerardo Carucci	Argentina	15.02	
7	Armando Pugliese	Peru	14.10	
8	Miguel Suárez	Bolivia	12.41	

=== Discus throw ===
7 November

Rank	Name	Nationality	Result	Notes
1st place, gold medalist(s)	José Carlos Jacques	Brazil	52.10	
2nd place, silver medalist(s)	Alejandro Serrano	Chile	48.94	
3rd place, bronze medalist(s)	Andrés Pérez	Chile	45.44	
4	Norberto Aimé	Argentina	45.42	
5	Claudio Escauriza	Paraguay	44.82	
6	Juan Adolfo Turri	Argentina	44.12	
7	Celso de Moraes	Brazil	43.96	
8	Álvaro Alzamora	Peru	42.20	

=== Hammer throw ===
5 November

Rank	Name	Nationality	Result	Notes
1st place, gold medalist(s)	Ivam Bertelli	Brazil	62.40	
2nd place, silver medalist(s)	Celso de Moraes	Brazil	61.22	
3rd place, bronze medalist(s)	Daniel Gómez	Argentina	59.72	
4	Ernesto Iglesias	Argentina	59.20	
5	Mario Egnem	Chile	56.06	
6	Edgar Yarce	Colombia	52.52	
7	Luis García	Ecuador	49.98	
8	Dante Retamal	Peru	47.90	

=== Javelin throw ===
8 November – Old model

Rank	Name	Nationality	Result	Notes
1st place, gold medalist(s)	José Carlos Lima e Souza	Brazil	75.02	CR
2nd place, silver medalist(s)	Luis Lucumí	Colombia	71.76	
3rd place, bronze medalist(s)	Amílcar de Barros	Brazil	70.12	
4	Juan Francisco Garmendia	Argentina	68.92	
5	Eustacio de León	Panama	66.26	
6	Domingo Mussio	Peru	59.66	
7	Jorge Mazzeo	Argentina	54.10	
8	Claudio Escauriza	Paraguay	52.14	

=== Decathlon ===
5–6 November – 1962 tables (1985 conversions given with *)

The highest mark recorded in each event is highlighted in yellow

Rank	Athlete	Nationality	100m	LJ	SP	HJ	400m	110m H	DT	PV	JT	1500m	Points	Conv.	Notes
1st place, gold medalist(s)	Paulo Lima	Brazil	10.3	7.26	14.33	2.00	48.5	15.6	39.34	4.30	49.58	6:17.0	7383	7157*	
2nd place, silver medalist(s)	Claudio Escauriza	Paraguay	10.9	6.88	13.02	1.80	53.2	16.5	45.84	4.00	56.88	6:29.8	6702	6477*	
3rd place, bronze medalist(s)	Fernando Brito	Brazil	10.6	7.07	12.32	1.90	54.5	15.5	39.28	4.00	46.36	6:59.0	6607	6319*	
	Tito Steiner	Argentina	11.4	7.03	15.26	1.85	DNF	DNS	–	–	–	–	DNF		

== Women's results ==
=== 100 metres ===
Heats – 7 November

Rank	Heat	Name	Nationality	Time	Notes
1	1	Sheila de Oliveira	Brazil	11.7	Q
2	1	Daisy Salas	Chile	11.8	Q
3	1	Brigitte Winter	Peru	12.0	Q
4	1	Susana Jenkins	Argentina	12.3	q
1	2	Carmela Bolívar	Peru	11.6	Q
2	2	Sueli Machado	Brazil	12.0	Q
3	2	Leslie Cooper	Chile	12.1	Q
4	2	María Sol Besada	Argentina	12.1	q

Final – 8 November

Rank	Name	Nationality	Time	Notes
1st place, gold medalist(s)	Carmela Bolívar	Peru	11.2	CR
2nd place, silver medalist(s)	Daisy Salas	Chile	11.4	
3rd place, bronze medalist(s)	Sueli Machado	Brazil	11.4	
4	Sheila de Oliveira	Brazil	11.5	
5	Leslie Cooper	Chile	11.6	
6	Brigitte Winter	Peru	12.1	
7	María Sol Besada	Argentina	12.1	
8	Susana Jenkins	Argentina	12.2	

=== 200 metres ===
Heats – 5 November

Rank	Heat	Name	Nationality	Time	Notes
1	1	Carmela Bolívar	Peru	23.6	Q
2	1	Sueli Machado	Brazil	23.8	Q
3	1	Daisy Salas	Chile	24.2	Q
4	1	María Sol Besada	Argentina	25.1	q
1	2	Eucaris Caicedo	Colombia	24.2	Q
2	2	Sheila de Oliveira	Brazil	24.3	Q
3	2	Patricia Pérez	Chile	24.8	Q
4	2	Brigitte Winter	Peru	24.8	q
5	2	Susana Jenkins	Argentina	26.0	

Final – 6 November

Rank	Name	Nationality	Time	Notes
1st place, gold medalist(s)	Eucaris Caicedo	Colombia	23.6	
2nd place, silver medalist(s)	Sueli Machado	Brazil	23.8	
3rd place, bronze medalist(s)	Carmela Bolívar	Peru	24.0	
4	Sheila de Oliveira	Brazil	24.2	
5	Daisy Salas	Chile	24.3	
6	Brigitte Winter	Peru	24.5	
7	Patricia Pérez	Chile	25.0	
	María Sol Besada	Argentina	?	

=== 400 metres ===
8 November

Rank	Name	Nationality	Time	Notes
1st place, gold medalist(s)	Eucaris Caicedo	Colombia	53.6	CR
2nd place, silver medalist(s)	Tânia Miranda	Brazil	55.7	
3rd place, bronze medalist(s)	Silvia Augsburger	Argentina	56.0	
4	Marcela López	Argentina	56.6	
5	Elba Barbosa	Brazil	58.3	

=== 800 metres ===
Heats – 7 November

Rank	Heat	Name	Nationality	Time	Notes
1	1	Luz Villa	Colombia	2:19.9	Q
2	1	Silvia Augsburger	Argentina	2:26.8	Q
3	1	Sonia Galdos	Peru	2:29.4	q
4	1	Graciela Mardones	Chile	2:38.6	q
1	2	Nancy González	Chile	2:28.3	Q
2	2	Sandra Ferreira	Brazil	2:28.5	Q
3	2	Marcela López	Argentina	2:38.1	

Final – 8 November

Rank	Name	Nationality	Time	Notes
1st place, gold medalist(s)	Nancy González	Chile	2:17.7	
2nd place, silver medalist(s)	Luz Villa	Colombia	2:19.1	
3rd place, bronze medalist(s)	Sandra Ferreira	Brazil	2:21.5	
4	Sonia Galdos	Peru	2:23.9	
5	Graciela Mardones	Chile	2:39.6	
	Silvia Augsburger	Argentina	?	

=== 1500 metres ===
5 November

Rank	Name	Nationality	Time	Notes
1st place, gold medalist(s)	Norma Vallejos	Chile	4:57.9	
2nd place, silver medalist(s)	Marcia Chiliquinga	Ecuador	5:01.9	
3rd place, bronze medalist(s)	Mery Rojas	Bolivia	5:04.0	
4	Mónica Regonesi	Chile	5:04.1	
5	Maricruz Sanjines	Bolivia	5:13.3	
6	Sonia Galdos	Peru	5:25.5	
7	Rosa de Souza	Brazil	5:25.6	

=== 3000 metres ===
8 November

Rank	Name	Nationality	Time	Notes
1st place, gold medalist(s)	Maricruz Sanjines	Bolivia	11:04.2	CR
2nd place, silver medalist(s)	Norma Vallejos	Chile	11:09.0	
3rd place, bronze medalist(s)	Mery Rojas	Bolivia	11:20.5	
4	Mónica Regonesi	Chile	11:24.3	
5	Rosa de Souza	Brazil	13:57.1	

=== 100 metres hurdles ===
8 November

Rank	Name	Nationality	Time	Notes
1st place, gold medalist(s)	Juraciara da Silva	Brazil	13.5	CR
2nd place, silver medalist(s)	Nancy Vallecilla	Ecuador	13.8	
3rd place, bronze medalist(s)	Beatriz Capotosto	Argentina	13.9	
4	Patricia Deck	Chile	14.3	
5	Susana Jenkins	Argentina	14.8	

=== 400 metres hurdles ===
6 November

Rank	Name	Nationality	Time	Notes
1st place, gold medalist(s)	Conceição Geremias	Brazil	1:00.0	CR
2nd place, silver medalist(s)	Nancy Vallecilla	Ecuador	1:02.2	
3rd place, bronze medalist(s)	Maria José Ferreira	Brazil	1:02.7	
4	Anabella dal Lago	Argentina	1:03.3	
5	Luz Villa	Colombia	1:06.9	

=== 4 × 100 metres relay ===
8 November

Rank	Nation	Competitors	Time	Notes
1st place, gold medalist(s)	Brazil	Juraciara da Silva, Conceição Geremias, Sueli Machado, Sheila de Oliveira	45.3	CR
2nd place, silver medalist(s)	Peru	Margarita Bustios, Carmela Bolívar, Rocío Roca, Brigitte Winter	46.7	NR
3rd place, bronze medalist(s)	Argentina	Susana Jenkins, Araceli Bruschini, María Sol Besada, Beatriz Capotosto	46.9	
4	Chile	Patricia Pérez, Paola Raab, Daisy Salas, Leslie Cooper	47.8	

=== 4 × 400 metres relay ===
6 November

Rank	Nation	Competitors	Time	Notes
1st place, gold medalist(s)	Brazil	Tânia Miranda, Sheila de Oliveira, Sueli Machado, Elba Barbosa	3:49.4	
2nd place, silver medalist(s)	Argentina	Silvia Augsburger, María Sol Besada, Beatriz Capotosto, Anabella Dal Lago	3:51.0	
3rd place, bronze medalist(s)	Chile	Nancy González, Leslie Cooper, Patricia Pérez, Graciela Mardones	3:59.3	
4	Bolivia	Virginia Ruiz, Mery Rojas, Carola Herbas, Rosemary Zeballos	4:14.9	

=== High jump ===
5 November

Rank	Name	Nationality	Result	Notes
1st place, gold medalist(s)	Ana Maria Marcon	Brazil	1.84	CR
2nd place, silver medalist(s)	Beatriz Dias	Brazil	1.77	
3rd place, bronze medalist(s)	Liliana Arigoni	Argentina	1.71	
4	Gloria Sánchez	Colombia	1.65	
5	Paola Raab	Chile	1.60	

=== Long jump ===
7 November

Rank	Name	Nationality	Result	Notes
1st place, gold medalist(s)	Conceição Geremias	Brazil	6.26	CR
2nd place, silver medalist(s)	Araceli Bruschini	Argentina	6.22	
3rd place, bronze medalist(s)	Graciela Acosta	Uruguay	5.97	
4	María Sol Besada	Argentina	5.96	
5	Gloria Sánchez	Colombia	5.90	
6	Andrea Acevedo	Chile	5.84	
7	Margarita Bustios	Peru	5.61	
8	Ana Maria Marcon	Brazil	5.50	

=== Shot put ===
8 November

Rank	Name	Nationality	Result	Notes
1st place, gold medalist(s)	Marinalva dos Santos	Brazil	14.80	
2nd place, silver medalist(s)	Maria Fernandes	Brazil	13.18	
3rd place, bronze medalist(s)	Patricia Guerrero	Peru	12.97	
4	Jazmín Cirio	Chile	12.86	
5	Alejandra Bevacqua	Argentina	12.18	
6	Yvonne Neddermann	Argentina	11.78	
7	Patricia Pinto	Bolivia	11.39	
8	Selene Saldarriaga	Colombia	10.51	

=== Discus throw ===
6 November

Rank	Name	Nationality	Result	Notes
1st place, gold medalist(s)	Odete Domingos	Brazil	47.62	
2nd place, silver medalist(s)	Selene Saldarriaga	Colombia	44.22	
3rd place, bronze medalist(s)	Gloria Martínez	Chile	41.36	
4	Marinalva dos Santos	Brazil	41.30	
5	Lucía Azcune	Uruguay	35.94	
6	Jazmín Cirio	Chile	31.98	

=== Javelin throw ===
5 November – Old model

Rank	Name	Nationality	Result	Notes
1st place, gold medalist(s)	Marli dos Santos	Brazil	50.52	
2nd place, silver medalist(s)	Carolina Weil	Chile	49.96	
3rd place, bronze medalist(s)	Ana María Campillay	Argentina	47.70	
4	Patricia Guerrero	Peru	42.92	
5	Olga Verissimo	Brazil	39.44	
6	Esmeralda Lozano	Colombia	38.60	

=== Heptathlon ===
7–8 November – 1962 tables (1985 conversions given with *)

The highest mark recorded in each event is highlighted in yellow

Rank	Athlete	Nationality	100m H	HJ	SP	200m	LJ	JT	800m	Points	Conv.	Notes
1st place, gold medalist(s)	Yvonne Neddermann	Argentina	14.5	1.62	11.70	25.7	6.03	36.48	2:29.1	5451	5241*	AR
2nd place, silver medalist(s)	Olga Verissimo	Brazil	15.0	1.65	10.96	26.0	5.57	42.20	2:49.5	5116	5172*	
3rd place, bronze medalist(s)	Paola Raab	Chile	14.9	1.65	8.76	24.8	5.60	30.30	2:32.0	5081	4892*	
4	Nancy Vallecilla	Ecuador	13.9	1.68	10.66	25.2	6.03	23.32	3:36.2	4808	4522*	
5	Jurema da Silva	Brazil	15.6	1.71	11.10	26.6	5.58	31.00	DNF	4436	4147*	
