= Mónica Regonesi =

Chilean long-distance runner

Personal information
- Born: April 27, 1961 (age 65)

Sport
- Sport: Track and field
Medal record
Representing Chile
Pan American Games
Bronze medal – third place	1983 Caracas	3000m
South American Games
Gold medal – first place	1982 Santa Fe	3000m
Gold medal – first place	1986 Santiago	3000m
Gold medal – first place	1986 Santiago	10,000m
Silver medal – second place	1982 Santa Fe	1500m

Mónica Patricia Regonesi Muranda (born April 27, 1961) is long-distance runner from Chile. She competed for her native country at the 1984 Summer Olympics in Los Angeles, California. There she ended up in 32nd place in the women's marathon. Regonesi set her personal best in the classic distance (2:40.28) in 1988. She also competed in the World Masters Athletics 2007 in Italy where she obtained first place in the marathon and 3rd place in the 10k.

== International competitions ==
Year	Competition	Venue	Position	Event	Notes
Representing Chile
1977	South American Youth Championships	Rio de Janeiro, Brazil	6th	400 m	61.62
1977	South American Youth Championships	Rio de Janeiro, Brazil	3rd	800 m	2:16.2
1977	South American Youth Championships	Rio de Janeiro, Brazil	3rd	4 × 400 m relay	3:57.7
1978	South American Junior Championships	São Paulo, Brazil	2nd	1500 m	4:36.9
1979	South American Championships	Bucaramanga, Colombia	3rd	1500 m	4:36.1
1980	Pan American Junior Championships	Sudbury, Canada	2nd	1500 m	4:25.79
1980	Pan American Junior Championships	Sudbury, Canada	4th	3000 m	9:40.1
1981	South American Championships	La Paz, Bolivia	4th	1500 m	5:04.1
1981	South American Championships	La Paz, Bolivia	4th	3000 m	11:24.3
1982	Southern Cross Games	Santa Fe, Argentina	2nd	1500 m	4:29.19
1982	Southern Cross Games	Santa Fe, Argentina	1st	3000 m	9:53.9
1983	World Championships	Helsinki, Finland	27th (h)	3000 m	9:31.95
1983	Pan American Games	Caracas, Venezuela	6th	1500 m	4:26.48
1983	Pan American Games	Caracas, Venezuela	3rd	3000 m	9:41.87
1983	Ibero-American Championships	Barcelona, Spain	8th	1500 m	4:25.87
1983	Ibero-American Championships	Barcelona, Spain	5th	3000 m	9:35.51
1983	South American Championships	Santa Fe, Argentina	2nd	1500 m	4:27.2
1983	South American Championships	Santa Fe, Argentina	1st	3000 m	9:57.2
1984	Olympic Games	Los Angeles, United States	–	3000 m	DNF
1984	Olympic Games	Los Angeles, United States	32nd	Marathon	2:44:44
1985	South American Championships	Santiago, Chile	1st	1500 m	4:22.45
1985	South American Championships	Santiago, Chile	1st	3000 m	9:29.67
1985	South American Championships	Santiago, Chile	1st	10,000 m	34:31.37
1985	World Cup	Canberra, Australia	6th	10,000 m	34:04.42^{1}
1986	Ibero-American Championships	Havana, Cuba	4th	3000 m	9:43.81
1986	South American Games	Santiago, Chile	1st	3000 m	9:41.13
1986	South American Games	Santiago, Chile	1st	10,000 m	35:25.30
1987	Pan American Games	Indianapolis, United States	7th	3000 m	9:50.08
1987	Pan American Games	Indianapolis, United States	4th	10,000 m	33:48.67
1987	World Championships	Rome, Italy	28th (h)	3000 m	9:26.11
1987	World Championships	Rome, Italy	19th (h)	10,000 m	34:57.64
1987	South American Championships	São Paulo, Brazil	1st	3000 m	9:47.30
1987	South American Championships	São Paulo, Brazil	2nd	10,000 m	35:00.6
1992	Ibero-American Championships	Seville, Spain	5th	10,000 m	34:06.62

^{1}Representing the Americas
