= Giorgio Mautino =

Peruvian sprinter

Personal information
- Full name: Giorgio Mautino Batuello
- Born: 1961 (age 64–65)

Sport
- Sport: Athletics
- Event(s): 100 metres, 200 metres

Giorgio Mautino Batuello (born 1961) is a retired Peruvian sprinter. He represented his country in the 100 and 200 metres at the 1983 World Championships without reaching the second round.

He and his brother Marco Mautino emigrated from Italy at an early age. His children, Paola Mautino and Fabrizio Mautino, are also sprinters.

== International competitions ==
Year	Competition	Venue	Position	Event	Notes
Representing Peru
1981	South American Championships	La Paz, Bolivia	5th	100 m	10.6
1981	South American Championships	La Paz, Bolivia	7th (h)	200 m	21.2
1981	South American Championships	La Paz, Bolivia	3rd	4 × 100 m relay	40.8
1983	World Championships	Helsinki, Finland	46th (h)	100 m	10.85
1983	World Championships	Helsinki, Finland	35th (h)	200 m	21.78
1983	South American Championships	Santa Fe, Argentina	3rd	100 m	10.5
1984	Friendship Games	Moscow, Soviet Union	27th (h)	100 m	11.01
1984	Friendship Games	Moscow, Soviet Union	16th (h)	200 m	22.04
1985	South American Championships	Santiago, Chile	12th (h)	100 m	11.08
1985	South American Championships	Santiago, Chile	5th	4 × 100 m relay	41.54
1986	Ibero-American Championships	Mexico City, Mexico	9th (h)	100 m	10.97
1986	Ibero-American Championships	Mexico City, Mexico	4th	4 × 100 m relay	41.40
1986	South American Games	Santiago, Chile	6th	100 m	10.89
1986	South American Games	Santiago, Chile	6th (h)	200 m	22.02^{1}
1986	South American Games	Santiago, Chile	1st	4 × 100 m relay	40.75
1988	Ibero-American Championships	Mexico City, Mexico	18th (h)	100 m	10.72
1988	Ibero-American Championships	Mexico City, Mexico	4th (extra)	200 m	21.77
1988	Ibero-American Championships	Mexico City, Mexico	6th	4 × 100 m relay	40.38
1989	Bolivarian Games	Maracaibo, Venezuela	3rd	4 × 100 m relay	41.39

^{1}Did not finish in the final
