= Patricia Guerrero (athlete) =

Peruvian javelin thrower

Personal information
- Full name: Patricia Guerrero Carrasco
- Nationality: Peruvian
- Born: 22 August 1961
- Died: 25 June 2008 (aged 46)
- Height: 1.70 m (5 ft 7 in)
- Weight: 69 kg (152 lb)

Sport
- Sport: Athletics
- Event: Javelin throw

Patricia Guerrero Carrasco (22 August 1961 – 25 June 2008) was a Peruvian athlete. She competed in the women's javelin throw at the 1980 Summer Olympics. Her personal best in the event was 49.36 metres set in 1983.

== International competitions ==
Year	Competition	Venue	Position	Event	Notes
Representing Peru
1975	South American Youth Championships	Quito, Ecuador	2nd	Shot put	11.64 m
1975	South American Youth Championships	Quito, Ecuador	3rd	Javelin throw	35.26 m
1976	South American Junior Championships	Maracaibo, Venezuela	3rd	Shot put	11.81 m
1976	South American Junior Championships	Maracaibo, Venezuela	1st	Javelin throw	39.74 m
1976	South American Youth Championships	Santiago, Chile	1st	Shot put	11.64 m
1976	South American Youth Championships	Santiago, Chile	1st	Javelin throw	44.60 m
1977	South American Youth Championships	Rio de Janeiro, Brazil	1st	Shot put	12.29 m
1977	South American Youth Championships	Rio de Janeiro, Brazil	1st	Javelin throw	44.06 m
1977	Bolivarian Games	La Paz, Bolivia	3rd	Shot put	12.21 m
1977	Bolivarian Games	La Paz, Bolivia	2nd	Javelin throw	45.52 m
1977	South American Championships	Montevideo, Uruguay	8th	Shot put	11.75 m
1977	South American Championships	Montevideo, Uruguay	1st	Javelin throw	45.46 m
1978	South American Junior Championships	São Paulo, Brazil	1st	Shot put	12.42 m
1978	South American Junior Championships	São Paulo, Brazil	3rd	Javelin throw	41.96 m
1979	South American Championships	Bucaramanga, Colombia	7th	Shot put	12.86 m
1979	South American Championships	Bucaramanga, Colombia	4th	Javelin throw	41.47 m
1980	Olympic Games	Moscow, Soviet Union	20th (q)	Javelin throw	45.42 m
1981	South American Championships	La Paz, Bolivia	3rd	Shot put	12.97 m
1981	South American Championships	La Paz, Bolivia	4th	Javelin throw	42.92 m
1981	Bolivarian Games	Barquisimeto, Venezuela	3rd	Shot put	13.20 m
1981	Bolivarian Games	Barquisimeto, Venezuela	2nd	Javelin throw	47.78 m
1982	Southern Cross Games	Santa Fe, Argentina	1st	Javelin throw	49.32 m
1985	South American Championships	Santiago, Chile	5th	Shot put	45.38 m
1985	South American Championships	Santiago, Chile	3rd	Javelin throw	45.38 m
