= Daysi Salas =

Personal information
- Full name: Daysi Nelly Eugenia Salas Morales
- Born: 17 December 1961 (age 64)

Sport
- Sport: Athletics
- Events: 100 m, 200 m

Daysi Nelly Eugenia Salas Morales (born 17 December 1961) is a retired Chilean sprinter. She won several medals at the continental level.

== International competitions ==
Year	Competition	Venue	Position	Event	Notes
Representing Chile
1978	South American Junior Championships	São Paulo, Brazil	2nd	100 m	12.4
1978	South American Junior Championships	São Paulo, Brazil	3rd	4 × 100 m relay	48.1
1981	South American Championships	La Paz, Bolivia	2nd	100 m	11.4
1981	South American Championships	La Paz, Bolivia	5th	200 m	24.3
1981	South American Championships	La Paz, Bolivia	4th	4 × 100 m relay	47.8
1982	Southern Cross Games	Santa Fe, Argentina	4th	100 m	25.29
1982	Southern Cross Games	Santa Fe, Argentina	2nd	4 × 100 m relay	47.3
1983	South American Championships	Santa Fe, Argentina	3rd	100 m	11.9
1983	South American Championships	Santa Fe, Argentina	4th	200 m	25.1
1985	South American Championships	Santiago, Chile	3rd	100 m	12.11
1985	South American Championships	Santiago, Chile	4th	200 m	24.36
1985	South American Championships	Santiago, Chile	1st	4 × 100 m relay	45.80
1987	South American Championships	São Paulo, Brazil	9th (h)	100 m	12.45
1987	South American Championships	São Paulo, Brazil	9th (h)	200 m	25.54
1987	South American Championships	São Paulo, Brazil	4th	4 × 100 m relay	46.63

== Personal bests ==
Outdoor

- 100 metres – 11.91
- 200 metres – 24.36 (+0.4, Santiago 1985)
