= Juraciara da Silva =

Brazilian athlete

Personal information
- Full name: Juraciara Pereira da Silva
- Born: 31 March 1961 (age 65)

Sport
- Sport: Athletics
- Event: 100 m hurdles

Juraciara Pereira da Silva (born 31 March 1961) is a Brazilian athlete specialising in the 100 metres hurdles. She won several medals on continental levels.

Her personal best in the event is 13.52 seconds set in Edmonton in 1983. This is a former national record beat by Maurren Maggi in 1999.

== International competitions ==
Year	Competition	Venue	Position	Event	Notes
Representing Brazil
1977	South American Youth Championships	Rio de Janeiro, Brazil	1st	80 m hurdles	12.38
1978	South American Junior Championships	São Paulo, Brazil	3rd	100 m hurdles	15.1
1981	Universiade	Bucharest, Romania	14th (h)	100 m hurdles	13.79
1981	South American Championships	La Paz, Bolivia	1st	100 m hurdles	13.5
1981	South American Championships	La Paz, Bolivia	1st	4 × 100 m relay	45.3
1983	Universiade	Edmonton, Canada	11th (h)	100 m hurdles	13.52
1983	Pan American Games	Caracas, Venezuela	8th	100 m hurdles	14.05
1983	South American Championships	Santa Fe, Argentina	2nd	100 m hurdles	13.7
1983	South American Championships	Santa Fe, Argentina	1st	4 × 100 m relay	45.4
1985	South American Championships	Santiago, Chile	3rd	100 m hurdles	13.97
1985	South American Championships	Santiago, Chile	2nd	4 × 100 m relay	46.09
1988	Ibero-American Championships	Mexico City, Mexico	8th	100 m hurdles	14.07
1988	Ibero-American Championships	Mexico City, Mexico	3rd	4 × 100 m relay	45.28
1989	South American Championships	Medellín, Colombia	1st	100 m hurdles	13.5
1990	Ibero-American Championships	Manaus, Brazil	4th	100 m hurdles	14.21
1991	South American Championships	Manaus, Brazil	5th	100 m hurdles	14.72
