= Pablo Squella =

Chilean journalist and retired middle-distance runner

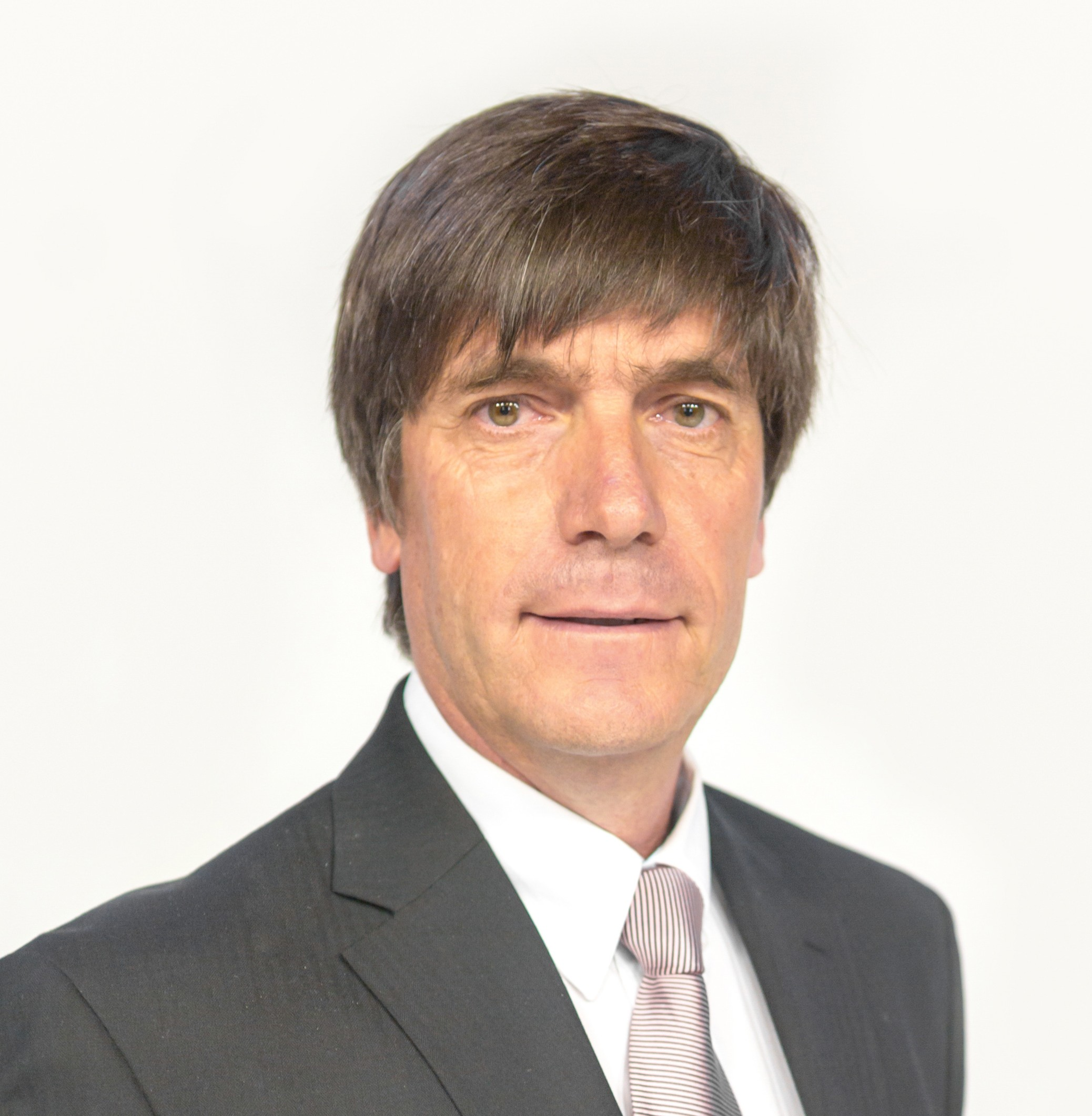
- Pablo Squella in 2016

Minister of Sports
- In office 18 November 2016 – 11 March 2018
- President: Michelle Bachelet
- Preceded by: Natalia Riffo
- Succeeded by: Pauline Kantor

Personal details
- Born: 14 August 1963 (age 63) Santiago, Chile
- Education: University of Chile (BA); University of Austin (M.D.)

Medal record

Men's athletics

Representing Chile

South American Games
Gold medal – first place	1982 Santa Fe	400 m
Gold medal – first place	1986 Santiago	400 m hurdles
Silver medal – second place	1994 Valencia	800 m

Pablo Cristián Squella Serrano (born August 14, 1963) is a Chilean journalist and retired middle distance runner who represented his native country at the 1988 Summer Olympics in Seoul, South Korea.

Squella competed for the Texas Longhorns track and field team in the NCAA. In 2012, he was inducted into the Penn Relays hall of fame. He finished fifth in the 800 metres and in the 400 metres hurdles at the 1987 Pan American Games.

He was appointed as minister of Sport of Chile by president Michelle Bachelet in 2016 and served in that position until 11 March 2018. He was the ambassador of the 2023 Pan American Games and the Parapan American Games in Santiago.

== Early life and education ==
Squella was born in Santiago on 14 August 1963, the son of architect Juan Arturo Squella and athlete and journalist Juana Serrano Lyon. He is married to Paula Gajardo and has five children: Tomás, Pablo, Micaela, Martina, and Sofía.

He studied journalism at the University of Chile and completed postgraduate studies in physical education at the University of Texas at Austin in the United States.

== Athletics career ==
As a student athlete, Squella achieved outstanding results in middle-distance running. His school record in the 800 metres (1:52.98) remained unbeaten for 24 years. He was a member of the Chilean national athletics team between 1980 and 1996.

Squella represented Chile at the 1988 Summer Olympics in Seoul, South Korea, and at the 1992 Summer Olympics in Barcelona, Spain. He was also selected for the Chilean delegation to the 1984 Summer Olympics in Los Angeles, although disagreements with sports officials prevented him from competing.

He continues to hold the Chilean junior record in the 400 metres (46.20) and the national senior record in the 800 metres (1:45.75).

== Political career ==
Following his retirement from athletics, Squella worked as a coach for young athletes and served as director of Chile's High Performance Training Centre ―Centro de Alto Rendimiento (CAR)― from 2001 to 2004. He also worked as a sports commentator and journalist for media outlets including La Tercera, Radio Cooperativa, UCV Televisión, Canal 13, and Televisión Nacional de Chile (TVN).

From 2008 onward, he held a number of public-sector positions related to sports administration. He served as coordinator of the National High Performance Technical Commission (2009–2010), coordinator of the Chilean Olympic Plan (2011–2012), and joined the Ministry of Sport's Division of Physical Activity and Sports in December 2013.

During Michelle Bachelet's second administration, Squella was appointed to the governing council of the National Commission for Doping Control (CNCD), later becoming its president.

On 18 November 2016, he was appointed Minister of Sport, succeeding Natalia Riffo. He remained in office until the end of Bachelet's administration in March 2018. During his tenure, Chile secured the hosting rights for the 2023 Pan American Games.

In 2025, Squella registered as an independent pre-candidate for the Chamber of Deputies in the 10th electoral district.

== International competitions ==
Representing Chile
Year	Competition	Venue	Position	Event	Notes
1980	South American Junior Championships	Santiago, Chile	5th	400 m	49.04
1980	South American Junior Championships	Santiago, Chile	1st	400 m hurdles	53.59
1980	South American Junior Championships	Santiago, Chile	3rd	4 × 400 m relay	3:19.3
1981	South American Junior Championships	Rio de Janeiro, Brazil	1st	400 m	47.9
1981	South American Junior Championships	Rio de Janeiro, Brazil	3rd	800 m	1:51.6
1981	South American Junior Championships	Rio de Janeiro, Brazil	3rd	4 × 400 m relay	3:16.1
1981	South American Championships	La Paz, Bolivia	3rd	400 m	48.0 A
1981	South American Championships	La Paz, Bolivia	2nd	400 m hurdles	52.7 A
1981	South American Championships	La Paz, Bolivia	2nd	4 × 400 m relay	3:11.8
1982	Pan American Junior Championships	Barquisimeto, Venezuela	2nd	800 m	1:50.34
1982	Pan American Junior Championships	Barquisimeto, Venezuela	2nd	400 m hurdles	51.70
1982	Southern Cross Games	Santa Fe, Argentina	1st	400 m	47.47
1982	Southern Cross Games	Santa Fe, Argentina	1st	400 m hurdles	50.81
1982	Southern Cross Games	Santa Fe, Argentina	1st	4 × 400 m relay	3:11.65
1985	South American Championships	Santiago, Chile	5th	400 m hurdles	52.44
1986	Ibero-American Championships	La Habana, Cuba	2nd	400 m hurdles	50.17
1986	South American Games	Santiago, Chile	1st	400 m hurdles	52.01
1986	South American Games	Santiago, Chile	1st	4 × 400 m relay	3:08.37
1987	World Indoor Championships	Indianapolis, United States	18th (h)	800 m	1:51.57
1987	Universiade	Zagreb, Yugoslavia	18th (sf)	800 m	1:51.14
1987	Universiade	Zagreb, Yugoslavia	7th (h)	400 m hurdles	50.56
1987	Universiade	Zagreb, Yugoslavia	6th	4 × 400 m relay	3:10.76
1987	Pan American Games	Indianapolis, United States	5th	800 m	1:48.39
1987	Pan American Games	Indianapolis, United States	5th	400 m hurdles	50.17
1987	World Championships	Rome, Italy	32nd (h)	400 m hurdles	50.73
1987	South American Championships	São Paulo, Brazil	1st	400 m hurdles	50.42
1987	South American Championships	São Paulo, Brazil	2nd	800 m	1:48.64
1987	South American Championships	São Paulo, Brazil	1st	4 × 400 m relay	3:07.64
1988	Olympic Games	Seoul, South Korea	10th (qf)	800 m	1:46.45
1989	World Indoor Championships	Budapest, Hungary	6th (h)	800 m	1:48.77^{1}
1989	South American Championships	Medellín, Colombia	1st	800 m	1:49.19 A
1989	South American Championships	Medellín, Colombia	3rd	4 × 400 m relay	3:06.34
1990	Ibero-American Championships	Manaus, Brazil	4th	1500 m	3:43.43
1991	World Indoor Championships	Seville, Spain	11th (sf)	800 m	1:50.60
1991	South American Championships	Manaus, Brazil	3rd	800 m	1:48.21
1991	South American Championships	Manaus, Brazil	5th	4 × 400 m relay	3:14.41
1991	Pan American Games	Havana, Cuba	4th	800 m	1:47.59
1991	World Championships	Tokyo, Japan	34th (h)	800 m	1:50.92
1992	Ibero-American Championships	Seville, Spain	2nd	800 m	1:48.29
1992	Ibero-American Championships	Seville, Spain	6th	4 × 400 m relay	3:11.51
1993	World Indoor Championships	Toronto, Canada	11th (sf)	800 m	1:50.25
1993	South American Championships	Lima, Peru	1st	800 m	1:51.98
1993	South American Championships	Lima, Peru	2nd	1500 m	3:51.00
1994	Ibero-American Championships	Mar del Plata, Argentina	2nd	800 m	1:49.50
1994	Ibero-American Championships	Mar del Plata, Argentina	4th	4 × 400 m relay	3:08.27
1994	South American Games	Valencia, Venezuela	2nd	800 m	1:51.24
1994	South American Games	Valencia, Venezuela	1st	4 × 400 m relay	3:06.92
1995	South American Championships	Manaus, Brazil	3rd	800 m	1:49.80
1995	South American Championships	Manaus, Brazil	3rd	4 × 400 m relay	3:11.83

^{1}Did not finish in the semifinals
