= 1978 South American Junior Championships in Athletics =

XII South American Junior Championships in Athletics
- Dates: December 15–17
- Host city: São Paulo, Brazil
- Level: Under-19
- Events: 34
- Participation: about 178 athletes from 8 nations

The 12th South American Junior Championships in Athletics were held in São Paulo, Brazil, between December 15–17, 1978.

== Participation (unofficial) ==
Detailed result lists can be found on the "World Junior Athletics History" website. An unofficial count yields the number of about 178 athletes from about 8 countries: Argentina (33), Bolivia (6), Brazil (53), Chile (42), Colombia (13), Paraguay (8), Peru (9), Uruguay (14).

== Medal summary ==
Medal winners are published for men and women Complete results can be found on the "World Junior Athletics History" website.

=== Men ===
Event	Gold		Silver		Bronze	
100 metres	Paulo Correia (BRA)	10.6	Elói Souza (BRA)	10.6	Carlos Gambetta (ARG)	10.8
200 metres	Carlos Gambetta (ARG)	22.0	Paulo Correia (BRA)	22.1	Alfredo Sancho (CHI)	22.5
400 metres	Antônio Dias Ferreira (BRA)	46.7	Arturo Marino (CHI)	48.2	Nilton dos Santos (BRA)	48.3
800 metres	Antônio Dias Ferreira (BRA)	1:50.3	Arturo Núñez (CHI)	1:50.9	Joaquim Cruz (BRA)	1:51.0
1500 metres	Cristián Castillo (CHI)	3:58.9	Omar Ortega (ARG)	3:59.2	Roger Soler (PER)	3:59.5
5000 metres	Cláudio Ribeiro (BRA)	14:53.0	Cristián Castillo (CHI)	14:57.2	Jorge Santos (BRA)	15:16.5
110 metres hurdles	Wellington da Nobrega (BRA)	14.6	Elías da Fonseca (BRA)	14.8	Felipe Víctor (CHI)	15.2
400 metres hurdles	Juan Carlos Fuentes (CHI)	53.0	Elías da Fonseca (BRA)	55.4	Wellington da Nobrega (BRA)	55.4
2000 metres steeplechase	Cristián Castillo (CHI)	6:01.2	Humberto Ramírez (COL)	6:04.6	Jorge Santos (BRA)	6:04.6
4 × 100 metres relay	Chile; Alfredo Sancho; Juan Carlos Silva; Roberto Gallaway; Enrique Tapia	41.6	Brazil; Adilson Kina; Antônio Ferreira; Nilton dos Santos; Paulo Roberto Correia	42.0	Argentina; García; Nicolás Glass; Adrian Ghirimoldi; Carlos Gambetta	42.0
4 × 400 metres relay	Chile; Blas de Mir Vidal; Felipe Edwards; Juan Carlos Fuentes; Arturo Merino	3:15.8	Argentina; Julio Robert; Roberto Malatesta; Nicolas Glass; Carlos Gambetta	3:16.9	Brazil; Sidney dos Santos; Ricardo Vidal de Oliveira; Adir; José António Mendes	3:17.4
High jump	Jorge Archanjo (BRA)	2.00	Víctor Migliaro (CHI)	2.00	Roderick Wilson (BRA)	2.00
Pole vault	Carlos da Silva (BRA)	4.45	Henry Gómez (COL)	4.20	Enrique Aramburú (PER)	4.00
Long jump	Carlos Gambetta (ARG)	7.07	Roberto Justino (BRA)	6.82	Jairo Monteiro (BRA)	6.82
Triple jump	Luiz Favero (BRA)	14.86	Roberto Justino (BRA)	14.72	Flavio Figueroa (COL)	14.72
Shot put	Gert Weil (CHI)	16.50	João Lima (BRA)	16.20	José Franco (CHI)	15.92
Discus throw	Juan Ortega (COL)	46.28	Roberto Malatesta (ARG)	43.52	Miro Ronac (PER)	43.34
Hammer throw	Ralf Frustockl (BRA)	56.38	Pedro Rivail Atílio (BRA)	55.66	Pedro Díaz (COL)	52.32
Javelin throw	Juan Garmendia (ARG)	65.12	Eduardo Viera (ARG)	62.42	Gustavo Arrau (CHI)	59.06
Decathlon	Miro Ronac (PER)	6391	Ronaldo Alcaraz (BRA)	6254	Fernando Britz (BRA)	6128

=== Women ===
Event	Gold		Silver		Bronze	
100 metres	Beatriz Capotosto (ARG)	12.4	Daysi Salas (CHI)	12.4	Carla Herencia (CHI)	12.4
200 metres	María Rojas (CHI)	25.5	Carla Lorenzetti (CHI)	25.7	Verónica Arrionda (URU)	25.9
400 metres	María Elena Labarca (CHI)	55.9	Cecilia Romero (CHI)	56.6	Maria José Santos (BRA)	57.7
800 metres	Marcela López (ARG)	2:11.9	Margit Weise (BRA)	2:13.0	Nancy González (CHI)	2:13.0
1500 metres	Marcela López (ARG)	4:36.3	Mónica Regonessi (CHI)	4:36.9	Genoveva Caro (CHI)	4:41.1
100 metres hurdles	Beatriz Capotosto (ARG)	14.6	Priscilla Sautchuck (BRA)	15.1	Juraciara da Silva (BRA)	15.1
4 × 100 metres relay	Chile; Cecilia Rodríguez; María Elena Labarca; Daysi Salas; Carla Herencía	48.1	Brazil; Maria José Santos; Celia da Silva; Maria Noguera; Elizabeth Montesano	48.1	Argentina; Susana Planas; Marisol Besada; Claudia Rodríguez; Beatriz Capotosto	48.2
4 × 400 metres relay	Argentina; Elba Labatte; Anabella Dal Lago; Silvia Augsburger; Marcela López	3:47.3	Chile; Carla Herencía; María Fernández; Cecilia Rodríguez; María Elena Labarca	3:47.8	Brazil; Celia da Silva; Elizabeth Montesano; Claudia Adolfo; Maria José Santos	3:56.8
High jump	Lucilene Lonardoni (BRA)	1.70	Evelyn Jabiles (PER)	1.65	Gloria Sánchez (COL)	1.65
Long jump	Beatriz Capotosto (ARG)	5.67	Marília Seifert (BRA)	5.56	Margot Mundín (URU)	5.55
Shot put	Patricia Guerrero (PER)	12.42	Célia Soares (BRA)	12.41	Maria Fernandes (BRA)	12.05
Discus throw	Márcia Barbosa (BRA)	39.60	Gloria Martínez (CHI)	39.16	Norma Lucía Azcune (URU)	38.74
Javelin throw	Neuza Trolezzi (BRA)	44.40	Gladys Aguayo (CHI)	43.32	Patricia Guerrero (PER)	41.96
Pentathlon	Lucilene Lonardoni (BRA)	3712	Ana Maria de Oliveira (BRA)	3490	Elizabeth Ordoni (CHI)	3242

== Medal table (unofficial) ==
* Host nation (Brazil)

Rank	Nation	Gold	Silver	Bronze	Total
1	Brazil (BRA)*	13	16	13	42
2	Chile (CHI)	9	11	8	28
3	Argentina (ARG)	9	4	3	16
4	Peru (PER)	2	1	4	7
5	Colombia (COL)	1	2	3	6
6	Uruguay (URU)	0	0	3	3
Totals (6 entries)		34	34	34	102
