= Paulo Roberto Correia =

Brazilian sprinter

Personal information
- Born: 14 February 1960 (age 66) São Paulo, Brazil
- Height: 1.78 m (5 ft 10 in)
- Weight: 72 kg (159 lb)

Sport
- Sport: Sprinting
- Event: 100 metres
Medal record
Representing Brazil
Summer Universiade
Bronze medal – third place	1981 Bucharest	4x400m relay

Paulo Roberto Correia (born 14 February 1960) is a Brazilian sprinter. He competed in the men's 100 metres at the 1984 Summer Olympics.

== International competitions ==
Year	Competition	Venue	Position	Event	Notes
Representing Brazil
1978	South American Junior Championships	São Paulo, Brazil	1st	100 m	10.6
1978	South American Junior Championships	São Paulo, Brazil	2nd	200 m	22.1
1978	South American Junior Championships	São Paulo, Brazil	2nd	4 × 100 m relay	42.0
1980	Olympic Games	Moscow, Soviet Union	15th (qf)	200 m	21.01
1980	Olympic Games	Moscow, Soviet Union	5th	4 × 400 m relay	3:05.9
1981	Universiade	Bucharest, Romania	4th (sf)	200 m	20.99^{1}
1981	South American Championships	La Paz, Bolivia	1st	200 m	20.2
1981	South American Championships	La Paz, Bolivia	1st	4 × 100 m relay	39.6
1983	Universiade	Edmonton, Canada	10th (sf)	100 m	10.50
1983	Universiade	Edmonton, Canada	15th (sf)	200 m	21.25
1983	South American Championships	Santa Fe, Argentina	2nd	100 m	10.5
1983	South American Championships	Santa Fe, Argentina	1st	200 m	21.3
1983	South American Championships	Santa Fe, Argentina	1st	4 × 100 m relay	40.7
1983	South American Championships	Santa Fe, Argentina	1st	4 × 400 m relay	3:10.8
1984	Olympic Games	Los Angeles, United States	21st (qf)	100 m	10.54
1984	Olympic Games	Los Angeles, United States	8th	4 × 100 m relay	39.40
1985	World Indoor Games	Paris, France	22nd (h)	60 m	6.91

^{1}Did not finish in the final

== Personal bests ==
Outdoor

- 100 metres – 10.37 (+0.2 m/s, São Paulo 1984)
- 200 metres – 20.2 (La Paz 1981)
- 200 metres – 20.98 (0.0 m/s, Ciudad Bolívar 1981)
- 400 metres – 46.6 (1980)

Indoor

- 60 metres – 6.91 (Paris 1985)
