= Marinalva dos Santos =

Personal information
- Full name: Marinalva Rita dos Santos
- Born: 2 May 1958 Salvador, Bahia, Brazil
- Died: 10 February 2023 (aged 64) Switzerland

Sport
- Sport: Athletics
- Events: Shot put, discus throw
- Club: AAUGF, PAEC

Marinalva Rita dos Santos (2 May 1958 – 10 February 2023) was a Brazilian athlete who competed in the shot put and discus throw. She won multiple medals at the continental level.

== International competitions ==
Year	Competition	Venue	Position	Event	Notes
Representing Brazil
1977	South American Championships	Montevideo, Uruguay	3rd	Shot put	12.59 m
1981	South American Championships	La Paz, Bolivia	1st	Shot put	14.80 m
1981	South American Championships	La Paz, Bolivia	4th	Discus throw	41.30 m
1983	Ibero-American Championships	Barcelona, Spain	2nd	Shot put	14.74 m
1983	South American Championships	Santa Fe, Argentina	2nd	Shot put	14.87 m
1985	South American Championships	Santiago, Chile	3rd	Shot put	14.44 m
1985	South American Championships	Santiago, Chile	2nd	Discus throw	43.50 m
1988	Ibero-American Championships	Mexico City, Mexico	6th	Shot put	14.57 m
1988	Ibero-American Championships	Mexico City, Mexico	7th	Discus throw	44.06 m
1989	South American Championships	Medellín, Colombia	1st	Shot put	15.16 m

== Personal bests ==
- Shot put – 15.81 (Rio de Janeiro 1982)
- Discus throw – 49.98 (São Paulo 1989)
