= Leopoldo Acosta =

Ecuadorian middle-distance runner (born 1962)

Leopoldo Acosta (born June 27, 1962) is a retired male track and field athlete from Ecuador who competed in the middle distance running events during his career. He represented his native South American country at the 1984 Summer Olympics in Los Angeles. Acosta set his personal best (1:51.44) in the men's 800 metres on December 12, 1986 in Santiago de Chile.
