= Marcus Barros =

Brazilian long jumper

Marcus César Pessoa Barros (born 29 April 1966) is a retired Brazilian long jumper.

Barros won the gold medal at the 1983 South American Junior Championships, the bronze medal at the 1983 South American Championships, the silver medal at the 1984 Pan American Junior Championships and finished twelfth at the 1985 World Indoor Games.

Barros also competed at the 1987 World Championships without reaching the final.
