= Francisco Vargas (athlete) =

Colombian racewalker

Personal information
- Nationality: Colombian
- Born: 12 November 1963 (age 62)
- Height: 1.72 m (5 ft 8 in)
- Weight: 58 kg (128 lb)

Sport
- Sport: Athletics
- Event: Racewalking

Francisco Vargas (born 12 November 1963) is a Colombian racewalker. He competed in the men's 20 kilometres walk at the 1984 Summer Olympics.

His personal best in the 20 kilometres walk is 1:23:10 set in 1987.
