= Athletics at the 1982 Southern Cross Games =

Athletics at the II Southern Cross Games
- Dates: 1–4 December
- Host city: Santa Fe, Argentina
- Venue: Centro de Alto Rendimiento Deportivo Pedro Candioti
- Level: Senior
- Events: 39 (23 men, 16 women)
- Participation: 145 athletes from 8 nations

Athletics events at the 1982 Southern Cross Games were held at the Centro de Alto Rendimiento Deportivo Pedro Candioti (CARD), equipped with one of the first synthetic tracks in Argentina, in Santa Fe, Argentina. A total of 39 events were contested, 23 by men and 16 by women.

== Medal summary ==
Medal winners were published in a book written by Argentinian journalist Ernesto Rodríguez III with support of the Argentine Olympic Committee (Spanish: Comité Olímpico Argentino) under the auspices of the Ministry of Education (Spanish: Ministerio de Educación de la Nación) in collaboration with the Office of Sports (Spanish: Secretaría de Deporte de la Nación). Eduardo Biscayart supplied the list of winners and their results.

=== Men ===
Event	Gold		Silver		Bronze	
100 metres (wind: -2.8)	Luis Schneider; Chile	10.87	Hugo Alzamora; Argentina	10.91	Mauricio Urquiza; Chile	11.01
200 metres (wind: -1.9)	Luis Schneider; Chile	21.28 GR	Gustavo Capart; Argentina	21.58	Ernesto Braun; Argentina	21.84
400 metres	Pablo Squella; Chile	47.47 GR	Daniel Bambicha; Argentina	48.20	Rubén Da Cunha; Uruguay	49.07
800 metres	Manuel Ramírez; Colombia	1:50.10 GR	Emilio Ulloa; Chile	1:50.12	Raúl López; Argentina	1:51.45
1500 metres	Emilio Ulloa; Chile	3:46.70 GR	Ricardo Vera; Uruguay	3:48.85	Abel Washington Godoy; Uruguay	3:49.06
5000 metres	Ricardo Vera; Uruguay	14:07.4 GR	Alejandro Silva; Chile	14:09.0	Omar Ortega; Argentina	14:10.1
10,000 metres	Alejandro Silva; Chile	29:35.9 GR	Luis Tipán; Ecuador	29:47.0	Omar Aguilar; Chile	29:55.6
Marathon	Alfredo Maravilla; Argentina	2:26:45 GR	Luis Tipán; Ecuador	2:27:00	Carlos Carvajal; Chile	2:30:00
110 m hurdles (wind: -4.7)	Juan Carlos Fuentes; Chile	15.15	Javier Olivar; Uruguay	15.27	Andrés Lyon; Chile	15.28
400 m hurdles	Pablo Squella; Chile	50.81 GR	Ricardo Biosco; Colombia	52.16	Javier Olivar; Uruguay	52.50
3000 m steeplechase	Emilio Ulloa; Chile	8:50.6 GR	Luis Palma; Chile	8:56.4	Sigfredo Romero; Colombia	9:06.0
4 × 100 metres relay	Mauricio Urquiza; Francisco Pichot; Juan Carlos Fuentes; Luis Schneider; Chile	41.00	Jorge Cotito; Ronald Raborg; Enrique Goytisolo; Mirko Kuljevan; Peru	43.00		
4 × 400 metres relay	Juan Carlos Fuentes; Alfredo Edwards; Luis Schneider; Pablo Squella; Chile	3:11.65 GR	Jorge Díaz; Raúl López; Gabriel Castellà; Daniel Bambicha; Argentina	3:13.99	Gabriel Díaz; Javier Olivar; Luis Cabral; Rubén da Cunha; Uruguay	3:19.57
20 kilometres walk	Oswaldo Morejón; Bolivia	1:37:06 GR	Jorge Yannone; Argentina	1:38:01	Esteban Quelale; Bolivia	1:38:12
High jump	Fernando Pastoriza; Argentina	2.03	Joaquín del Real; Chile	2.03	Horacio Acevedo; Argentina	2.00
Pole vault	Fernando Hoces; Chile	4.80 GR	Fernando Ruocco; Uruguay	4.80 GR	Marcelo Cibié; Chile	4.50
Long jump	Francisco Pichot; Chile	7.44	Eduardo Labalta; Argentina	7.17	Mirko Kuljevan; Paraguay	7.06
Triple jump	Francisco Pichot; Chile	15.73 w	Angel Gagliano; Argentina	15.19 w	Jorge Mazzeo; Argentina	15.07 w
Shot put	Gert Weil; Chile	17.37 GR	Tito Steiner; Argentina	15.29	Gerardo Carucci; Argentina	15.12
Discus throw	Carlos Bryner; Argentina	50.26 GR	Gert Weil; Chile	47.90	Alejandro Serrano; Chile	47.60
Hammer throw	Daniel Gómez; Argentina	56.24	Ernesto Iglesias; Argentina	53.40	Gert Weil; Chile	35.08
Javelin throw	Luis Lucumi; Colombia	77.98 GR	Juan Francisco Garmendia; Argentina	76.12	Antar Martínez; Colombia	68.70
Decathlon	Carlos Gambetta; Argentina	7103 pts GR	Claudio Escauriza; Paraguay	6774 pts	Hugo Giménez; Argentina	6168 pts

=== Women ===
Event	Gold		Silver		Bronze	
100 metres (wind: -1.1)	Carmela Bolívar; Peru	12.40	Leslie Cooper; Chile	12.55	Carla Herencia; Chile	12.72
200 metres (NWI)	Eucaris Caicedo; Colombia	24.48	Margarita Grun; Uruguay	24.70	Carmela Bolívar; Peru	24.99
400 metres	Eucaris Caicedo; Colombia	54.21 GR	Margarita Grun; Uruguay	54.84	Cecilia Rodríguez; Chile	56.19
800 metres	Liliana Góngora; Argentina	2:09.06 GR	Norfalia Carabalí; Colombia	2:11.55	Silvia Augsburger; Argentina	2:11.78
1500 metres	Liliana Góngora; Argentina	4:25.92 GR	Mónica Regonesi; Chile	4:29.19	Marcela Arriagada; Chile	4:34.06
3000 metres	Mónica Regonesi; Chile	9:53.9 GR	Marcia Susana Chiliquinga; Ecuador	10:04.5	Sonia Molina; Argentina	10:12.5
100 m hurdles (wind: -1.8)	Beatriz Capotosto; Argentina	13.75	Susana Jenkins; Argentina	14.90	Nadia Katich; Colombia	15.15
400 m hurdles	Anabella Dal Lago; Argentina	62.20 GR	Valentina Bahamonde; Chile	63.37		
4 × 100 metres relay	Hilda Márquez; Susana Jenkins; Graciela Palacín; Beatriz Capotosto; Argentina	47.1	Cecilia Rodríguez; Carla Herencia; Daisy Salas; Leslie Cooper; Chile	47.3	María Isabel Urrutia; Norfalia Carabalí; Nadia Katich; Eucaris Caicedo; Colombia	49.3
4 × 400 metres relay	Carla Herencia; Paola Raab; Graciela Mardones; Cecilia Rodríguez; Chile	3:45.74 GR	Amalia Linietzky; Silvia Augsburger; Anabella Dal Lago; Marcela López Espinosa; Argentina	3:46.26		
High jump	Andrea Sassi; Uruguay	1.70	Carmen Garib; Chile	1.70	Mónica Halporn; Argentina	1.65
Long jump	Araceli Bruschini; Argentina	5.85 w	Graciela Acosta; Uruguay	5.83 w	Andrea Sassi; Uruguay	5.54 w
Shot put	María Isabel Urrutia; Colombia	13.27 GR	Jazmín Cirio; Chile	13.18	Alejandra Bevacqua; Argentina	12.71
Discus throw	María Isabel Urrutia; Colombia	44.84 GR	Gloria Martínez; Chile	44.22	Elizabeth Martínez; Argentina	39.80
Javelin throw	Patricia Guerrero; Peru	49.32 GR	Ana María Campillay; Argentina	46.22	Carolina Kittsteiner; Chile	46.20
Heptathlon	Paola Raab; Chile	4754 pts GR	Ana María Comaschi; Argentina	4580 pts	María Esther Mediano; Chile	4540 pts

== Medal table (unofficial) ==
* Host nation (Argentina)

Rank	Nation	Gold	Silver	Bronze	Total
1	Chile (CHI)	17	12	12	41
2	Argentina (ARG)*	11	14	12	37
3	Colombia (COL)	6	2	4	12
4	Uruguay (URU)	2	6	5	13
5	Peru (PER)	2	1	1	4
6	Bolivia (BOL)	1	0	1	2
7	Ecuador (ECU)	0	3	0	3
8	Paraguay (PAR)	0	1	1	2
Totals (8 entries)		39	39	36	114

== Participating nations ==
- Argentina (61)
- Bolivia (6)
- Chile (34)
- Colombia (10)
- Ecuador (2)
- Paraguay (12)
- Peru (7)
- Uruguay (13)
