= 1983 South American Championships in Athletics =

- Dates: 29 September–2 October
- Host city: Santa Fe, Argentina
- Venue: Centro de Alto Rendimiento Deportivo Pedro Candioti
- Events: 39
- Participation: 231 athletes from 10 nations

The 1983 South American Championships in Athletics were held at the Centro de Alto Rendimiento Deportivo Pedro Candioti in Santa Fe, Argentina, between 29 September and 2 October.

== Medal summary ==
=== Men's events ===
Event	Gold		Silver		Bronze	
100 metres (wind: -0.7 m/s)	Nelson dos Santos; Brazil	10.3	Paulo Correia; Brazil	10.5	Giorgio Mautino; Peru	10.5
200 metres (wind: -1.8 m/s)	Paulo Correia; Brazil	21.3	Nelson dos Santos; Brazil	21.5	José María Beduino; Argentina	21.7
400 metres	Sérgio Menezes; Brazil	46.8	Evaldo da Silva; Brazil	47.4	Wolfman Mena; Colombia	47.5
800 metres	José Luíz Barbosa; Brazil	1:49.1	Emilio Ulloa; Chile	1:49.2	Raúl López; Argentina	1:50.5
1500 metres	Emilio Ulloa; Chile	3:48.3	Omar Ortega; Argentina	3:48.9	Adauto Domingues; Brazil	3:50.8
5000 metres	Omar Aguilar; Chile	14:00.9	João de Ataide; Brazil	14:01.2	Germán Peña; Colombia	14:03.1
10,000 metres	Omar Aguilar; Chile	29:12.1	João de Ataide; Brazil	29:13.4	Jairo Correa; Colombia	29:22.7
Marathon	Juan Plagman; Chile	2:15:50	Jairo Correa; Colombia	2:17:43	Rafael Parra; Colombia	2:19:42
110 metres hurdles (wind: +0.9 m/s)	Pedro Chiamulera; Brazil	14.3	Wellington da Nobrega; Brazil	14.5	Rodolfo Iturraspe; Argentina	14.9
400 metres hurdles	Pedro Chiamulera; Brazil	52.2	Rodrigo de la Fuente; Chile	52.7	Elias da Fonseca; Brazil	52.8
3000 metres steeplechase	Emilio Ulloa; Chile	8:44.6 CR	Wilson de Santana; Brazil	8:47.7	Adauto Domingues; Brazil	8:50.8
4 × 100 metres relay	Brazil; Marcus Barros; Nelson dos Santos; Paulo Correia; Sérgio Menezes	40.7	Argentina; Alfredo Muro; Oscar Barrionuevo; Hugo Alzamora; José María Beduino	40.8	Uruguay; Luis Cabral; Daniel Ipata; Anataniel Guzmán; Rubén da Cunha	41.4
4 × 400 metres relay	Brazil; Paulo Roberto Correia; Evaldo da Silva; José Luíz Barbosa; Sérgio Menezes	3:10.8	Chile; Carlos Contreras; Rodrigo de la Fuente; Luis Alberto Schneider; Mauricio Urquiza	3:13.6	Argentina; Eduardo Sandes; Daniel Bambicha; Hugo Alzamora; Raúl López	3:14.5
20 kilometres road walk	Héctor Moreno; Colombia	1:24:12 CR	Francisco Vargas; Colombia	1:25:35	Osvaldo Morejón; Bolivia	1:32:20
High jump	Jorge Archanjo; Brazil	2.14	Fernando Pastoriza; Argentina	2.14	Rodrigo de la Fuente; Chile	2.04
Pole vault	Fernando Hoces; Chile	4.70	Renato Bortolocci; Brazil	4.60	Walter Franzantti; Argentina; Oscar Veit; Argentina	4.50
Long jump	Osvaldo Frigerio; Argentina	7.51	Luiz Favero; Brazil	7.41	Marcus Barros; Brazil	7.28
Triple jump	Francisco Pichott; Chile	15.64	José Quiñaliza; Ecuador	15.52	Jailto Bonfim; Brazil	15.44
Shot put	Gert Weil; Chile	18.29 CR	Juan Turri; Argentina	16.56	Adilson Oliveira; Brazil	15.70
Discus throw	José Jacques; Brazil	51.86	Celso da Cunha; Brazil	50.50	Andrés Pérez; Chile	49.24
Hammer throw	Ivam Bertelli; Brazil	61.16	Roberto Olcese; Argentina	60.56	Pedro Rivail Atílio; Brazil	59.74
Javelin throw	José de Souza; Brazil	74.54	Luis Martínez; Colombia	71.48	Amilcar de Barros; Brazil	71.24
Decathlon	Carlos Gambetta; Argentina	7252	Ronaldo Alcaraz; Brazil	7096	Antônio Balbuena; Brazil	6959

=== Women's events ===
Event	Gold		Silver		Bronze	
100 metres (wind: +0.4 m/s)	Esmeralda de Jesus Garcia; Brazil	11.6	Sheila de Oliveira; Brazil	11.8	Daisy Salas; Chile	11.9
200 metres (wind: -1.5 m/s)	Jucilene Garcês; Brazil	24.5	Sheila de Oliveira; Brazil	24.9	Margarita Grün; Uruguay	24.9
400 metres	Elba Barbosa; Brazil	54.0	Jucilene Garcês; Brazil	54.0	Norfalia Carabalí; Colombia	54.8
800 metres	Alejandra Ramos; Chile	2:04.6	Soraya Telles; Brazil	2:06.2	Norfalia Carabalí; Colombia	2:07.2
1500 metres	Alejandra Ramos; Chile	4:25.3	Monica Regonesi; Chile	4:27.2	Adriana Marchena; Venezuela	4:27.5
3000 metres	Monica Regonesi; Chile	9:57.2 CR	María Victoria Biondi; Argentina	10:02.2	Ruth Jaime; Peru	10:06.3
100 metres hurdles (wind: -0.3 m/s)	Beatriz Capotosto; Argentina	13.2 CR	Juraciara da Silva; Brazil	13.7	Orlane dos Santos; Brazil	14.4
400 metres hurdles	Conceição Geremias; Brazil	59.5 CR	Margit Weise; Brazil	60.5	Anabella Dal Lago; Argentina	62.6
4 × 100 metres relay	Brazil; Elba Barbosa; Juraciara da Silva; Esmeralda Garcia; Sheila de Oliveira	45.4	Uruguay; Graciela Acosta; Andrea Sassi; Claudia Acerenza; Margarita Grün	47.7	Only two finishers	
4 × 400 metres relay	Brazil; Margit Weise; Maria do Carmo Fialho; Jucilene Garcês; Elba Barbosa	3:40.0 CR	Chile; Graciela Mardones; Paola Raab; Alejandra Ramos; Cecilia Rodríguez	3:45.3	Argentina; Amalia Linietzky; Marcela López; María Elena Croatto; Andrea Fuchs	3:48.7
High jump	Orlane dos Santos; Brazil	1.80	Conceição Geremias; Brazil	1.77	Liliana Arigoni; Argentina; Carmen Garib; Chile	1.71
Long jump	Esmeralda de Jesus Garcia; Brazil	6.12	Adriana Ruffin; Chile	5.84	Orlane dos Santos; Brazil	5.79
Shot put	Maria Fernandes; Brazil	15.01 CR	Marinalva dos Santos; Brazil	14.87	Jazmín Cirio; Chile	14.04
Discus throw	Odete Domingos; Brazil	49.30	María Isabel Urrutia; Colombia	45.00	Maria Fernandes; Brazil	44.72
Javelin throw	Marieta Riera; Venezuela	51.04 CR	Carolina Weil; Chile	50.68	Mariela Riera; Venezuela	49.18
Heptathlon	Conceição Geremias; Brazil	5865 CR	Olga Verissimo; Brazil	5371	Yvonne Neddermann; Argentina	5273

== Medal table ==
Rank	Nation	Gold	Silver	Bronze	Total
1	Brazil (BRA)	23	20	12	55
2	Chile (CHI)	11	7	5	23
3	Argentina (ARG)	3	6	10	19
4	Colombia (COL)	1	4	6	11
5	Venezuela (VEN)	1	0	2	3
6	Uruguay (URU)	0	1	2	3
7	Ecuador (ECU)	0	1	0	1
8	Peru (PER)	0	0	2	2
9	Bolivia (BOL)	0	0	1	1
Totals (9 entries)		39	39	40	118

== Participating nations ==
- Argentina (67)
- Bolivia (6)
- Brazil (45)
- Chile (36)
- Colombia (15)
- Ecuador (4)
- Paraguay (15)
- Peru (11)
- Uruguay (25)
- Venezuela (7)

== See also ==
- 1983 in athletics (track and field)
