= 1981 South American Championships in Athletics =

- Dates: 5–8 November
- Host city: La Paz, Bolivia
- Venue: Estadio Olímpico Hernando Siles
- Events: 39
- Participation: 185 athletes from 10 nations
- Records set: 1 AR, 15 CR

The 1981 South American Championships in Athletics were held at the Estadio Olímpico Hernando Siles in La Paz, Bolivia, between 5 and 8 November. The stadium was located 3600 metres above sea level, which is said to help the performance in some events.

It was the first edition to feature women's 3000 metres and 400 metres hurdles. Women's pentathlon was also replaced with heptathlon.

== Medal summary ==
=== Men's events ===
Event	Gold		Silver		Bronze	
100 metres	Katsuhiko Nakaia; Brazil	10.1A =CR	Altevir de Araújo; Brazil	10.3A	Luis Alberto Schneider; Chile	10.3A
200 metres	Paulo Correia; Brazil	20.2A CR	Héctor Daley; Panama	20.5A	Luis Alberto Schneider; Chile	20.5A
400 metres	Geraldo Pegado; Brazil	46.8A	Gerson de Souza; Brazil	47.8A	Pablo Squella; Chile	48.0A
800 metres	Cristián Molina; Chile	1:53.6A	José Luíz Barbosa; Brazil	1:54.7A	Wilson dos Santos; Brazil	1:55.9A
1500 metres	Emilio Ulloa; Chile	4:07.1A	Jhonny Pérez; Bolivia	4:08.0A	Jaime Punina; Ecuador	4:09.0A
5000 metres	Víctor Mora; Colombia	15:23.9A	Silvio Salazar; Colombia	15:51.4A	Jhonny Pérez; Bolivia	15:59.4A
10,000 metres	Víctor Mora; Colombia	31:56.4A	Silvio Salazar; Colombia	32:57.1A	Hugo Gavino; Peru	33:30.9A
Half marathon	Víctor Mora; Colombia	1:10:42A	Alfonso Torres; Colombia	1:13:20A	René Moldez; Bolivia	1:14:54A
110 metres hurdles	Juan Carlos Fuentes; Chile	14.2A	Wellington da Nobrega; Brazil	14.4A	Andrés Lyon; Chile	14.4A
400 metres hurdles	Antônio Dias Ferreira; Brazil	52.3A	Pablo Squella; Chile	52.7A	Donizete Soares; Brazil	53.0A
3000 metres steeplechase	Emilio Ulloa; Chile	9:53.2A	Jhonny Pérez; Bolivia	9:54.2A	Elói Schleder; Brazil	10:19.8A
4 × 100 metres relay	Brazil; Paulo Correia; Paulo Lima; Katsuhiko Nakaia; Altevir de Araújo	39.6A CR	Chile; Héctor Fernández; Juan Carlos Fuentes; Luis Alberto Schneider; Francisco Pichott	40.4A	Peru; Ronald Raborg; Giorgio Mautino; José Luis Valverde; Marco Mautino	40.8A
4 × 400 metres relay	Brazil; Agberto Guimarães; Geraldo Pegado; Gerson de Souza; José Luíz Barbosa	3:09.5A	Chile; Rodrigo Muñoz; Pablo Squella; Francisco Pichott; Emilio Ulloa	3:11.8A	Argentina; Jorge Díaz; Nicolás Glass; Raúl López; Angel Gagliano	3:12.2A
20 kilometres road walk	Osvaldo Morejón; Bolivia	1:51:22A	Ernesto Alfaro; Colombia	1:52:52A	Waldemar da Silva; Brazil	1:53:10A
High jump	Jorge Archanjo; Brazil	2.15A CR	Cláudio Freire; Brazil	2.10A	Daniel Wolfberg; Chile	2.05A
Pole vault	Fernando Hoces; Chile	4.90A CR	Fernando Ruocco; Uruguay	4.70A	Renato Bortolocci; Brazil	4.60A
Long jump	Francisco Pichott; Chile	7.55A	Luís de Souza; Brazil	7.25A	Cláudio Flores; Brazil	7.25A
Triple jump	João Carlos de Oliveira; Brazil	17.05A CR	Francisco Pichott; Chile	16.23A	Angel Gagliano; Argentina	15.95A
Shot put	Gert Weil; Chile	17.48A	Juan Turri; Argentina	16.54A	José Jacques; Brazil	16.31A
Discus throw	José Jacques; Brazil	52.10A	Alejandro Serrano; Chile	48.94A	Andrés Pérez; Chile	45.44A
Hammer throw	Ivam Bertelli; Brazil	62.40A	Celso de Moraes; Brazil	61.22A	Daniel Gómez; Argentina	59.72A
Javelin throw	José de Souza; Brazil	75.02A CR	Luis Lucumí; Colombia	71.76A	Amilcar de Barros; Brazil	70.12A
Decathlon	Paulo Lima; Brazil	7383A	Claudio Escauriza; Paraguay	6702A	Fernando Brito; Brazil	6607A

=== Women's events ===
Event	Gold		Silver		Bronze	
100 metres	Carmela Bolívar; Peru	11.2A CR	Daisy Salas; Chile	11.4A	Sueli Machado; Brazil	11.4A
200 metres	Eucaris Caicedo; Colombia	23.6A	Sueli Machado; Brazil	23.8A	Carmela Bolívar; Peru	24.0A
400 metres	Eucaris Caicedo; Colombia	53.6A CR	Tânia Miranda; Brazil	55.7A	Silvia Augsburger; Argentina	56.0A
800 metres	Nancy González; Chile	2:17.7A	Luz Villa; Colombia	2:19.1A	Sandra Ferreira; Brazil	2:21.5A
1500 metres	Norma Vallejos; Chile	4:57.9A	Nancy Chiliquinga; Ecuador	5:01.9A	Mery Rojas; Bolivia	5:04.0A
3000 metres	Maricruz Sangines; Bolivia	11:04.2A CR	Norma Vallejos; Chile	11:09.0A	Mery Rojas; Bolivia	11:20.5A
100 metres hurdles	Juraciara da Silva; Brazil	13.5A CR	Nancy Vallecilla; Ecuador	13.8A	Beatriz Capotosto; Argentina	13.9A
400 metres hurdles	Conceição Geremias; Brazil	60.0A CR	Nancy Vallecilla; Ecuador	62.2A	Maria Ferreira; Brazil	62.7A
4 × 100 metres relay	Brazil; Juraciara da Silva; Conceição Geremias; Sueli Machado; Sheila de Oliveira	45.3A CR	Peru; Margarita Bustios; Carmela Bolivár; Rocío Roca; Brigitte Winter	46.7A (NR)	Argentina; Susana Jenkins; Araceli Bruschini; María Sol Besada; Beatriz Capotosto	46.9A
4 × 400 metres relay	Brazil; Tânia Miranda; Sheila de Oliveira; Sueli Machado; Elba Barbosa	3:49.4A	Argentina; Silvia Augsburger; María Sol Besada; Beatriz Capotosto; Anabella Dal Lago	3:51.0A	Chile; Nancy González; Leslie Cooper; Patricia Pérez; Graciela Mardones	3:59.3A
High jump	Ana Maria Marcon; Brazil	1.84A CR	Beatriz Bonfim; Brazil	1.77A	Liliana Arigoni; Argentina	1.71A
Long jump	Conceição Geremias; Brazil	6.26A CR	Araceli Bruschini; Argentina	6.22A	Graciela Acosta; Uruguay	5.97A
Shot put	Marinalva dos Santos; Brazil	14.80A	Maria Fernandes; Brazil	13.18A	Patricia Guerrero; Peru	12.97A
Discus throw	Odete Domingos; Brazil	47.62A	Selene Saldarriaga; Colombia	44.22A	Gloria Martínez; Chile	41.36A
Javelin throw	Marli dos Santos; Brazil	50.52A	Carolina Weil; Chile	49.96A	Ana María Campillay; Argentina	47.70A
Heptathlon	Yvonne Neddermann; Argentina	5451A AR	Olga Verissimo; Brazil	5116A	Paola Raab; Chile	5081

A = affected by altitude

== Medal table ==
Rank	Nation	Gold	Silver	Bronze	Total
1	Brazil (BRA)	21	12	12	45
2	Chile (CHI)	9	8	9	26
3	Colombia (COL)	5	7	0	12
4	Bolivia (BOL)	2	2	4	8
5	Argentina (ARG)	1	3	8	12
6	Peru (PER)	1	1	4	6
7	Ecuador (ECU)	0	3	1	4
8	Uruguay (URU)	0	1	1	2
9	Panama (PAN)	0	1	0	1
9	Paraguay (PAR)	0	1	0	1
Totals (10 entries)		39	39	39	117

== Participating nations ==
- Argentina (30)
- Bolivia (23)
- Brazil (50)
- Chile (33)
- Colombia (13)
- Ecuador (9)
- Panama (2)
- Paraguay (2)
- Peru (19)
- Uruguay (4)

== See also ==
- 1981 in athletics (track and field)
