= 1985 South American Championships in Athletics – Results =

These are the results of the 1985 South American Championships in Athletics which took place at the Estadio Nacional in Santiago, Chile, between 12 and 15 September.

== Men's results ==
=== 100 metres ===
Heats – 12 September
Wind:
Heat 1: -0.5 m/s, Heat 2: -0.2 m/s

Rank	Heat	Name	Nationality	Time	Notes
1	1	Arnaldo da Silva	Brazil	10.56	Q
1	2	Robson da Silva	Brazil	10.56	Q
3	1	Enrique Canavire	Venezuela	10.67	Q
3	2	Oscar Barrionuevo	Argentina	10.67	Q
5	2	Marco Mautino	Peru	10.84	Q
6	1	Jorge Reboiras	Uruguay	10.86	Q
6	2	Álvaro Prenafeta	Chile	10.86	q
8	1	Hugo Alzamora	Argentina	10.88	q
9	1	Fernando Arroyo	Colombia	10.94	
10	1	Luis Alberto Schneider	Chile	11.01	
11	2	Nelson Oquendo	Venezuela	11.03	
12	1	Giorgio Mautino	Peru	11.08	
13	2	Luis Dorrego	Uruguay	11.19	
14	2	Luis Villalba	Paraguay	11.27	
15	1	Bolívar Luzuriaga	Ecuador	11.58	
16	2	Julio Guerrero	Ecuador	11.81	

Final – 13 September

Wind: -0.2 m/s

Rank	Name	Nationality	Time	Notes
1st place, gold medalist(s)	Arnaldo da Silva	Brazil	10.39	
2nd place, silver medalist(s)	Robson da Silva	Brazil	10.45	
3rd place, bronze medalist(s)	Enrique Canavire	Venezuela	10.69	
4	Oscar Barrionuevo	Argentina	10.79	
5	Hugo Alzamora	Argentina	10.86	
6	Álvaro Prenafeta	Chile	10.92	
7	Jorge Reboiras	Uruguay	10.95	
8	Marco Mautino	Peru	10.98	

=== 200 metres ===
Heats – 14 September
Wind:
Heat 1: -0.4 m/s, Heat 2: -0.6 m/s

Rank	Heat	Name	Nationality	Time	Notes
1	2	Robson da Silva	Brazil	21.08	Q
2	1	Sérgio Menezes	Brazil	21.49	Q
3	1	Oscar Barrionuevo	Argentina	21.63	Q
4	2	Álvaro Prenafeta	Chile	21.68	Q
5	2	Marco Mautino	Peru	21.84	Q
6	1	Eduardo Fuentes	Chile	22.00	Q
7	2	Gustavo Capart	Argentina	22.11	q
8	1	Jorge Reboiras	Uruguay	22.13	q
9	1	Moisés del Castillo	Peru	22.23	
10	2	Luis Cabral	Uruguay	22.29	
11	2	Fernando Arroyo	Colombia	22.31	
12	1	Marcelo Rejas	Bolivia	22.69	
13	1	Luis Villalba	Paraguay	22.77	
14	2	Pablo Duré	Paraguay	22.90	
15	1	Bolívar Luzuriaga	Ecuador	23.35	
16	2	Julio Guerrero	Ecuador	23.87	

Final – 15 September

Wind: -0.5 m/s

Rank	Name	Nationality	Time	Notes
1st place, gold medalist(s)	Robson da Silva	Brazil	20.70	
2nd place, silver medalist(s)	Oscar Barrionuevo	Argentina	21.42	
3rd place, bronze medalist(s)	Sérgio Menezes	Brazil	21.47	
4	Álvaro Prenafeta	Chile	21.49	
5	Marco Mautino	Peru	21.69	
6	Eduardo Fuentes	Chile	21.72	
7	Gustavo Capart	Argentina	22.17	
8	Jorge Reboiras	Uruguay	22.19	

=== 400 metres ===
Heats – 12 September

Rank	Heat	Name	Nationality	Time	Notes
1	1	Sérgio Menezes	Brazil	46.81	Q
2	1	José María Beduino	Argentina	47.19	Q
3	1	Héctor Daley	Panama	47.21	Q
4	2	Aaron Phillips	Venezuela	47.30	Q
5	1	Carlos Morales	Chile	47.34	q
6	2	Wilson dos Santos	Brazil	47.79	Q
7	2	Gustavo Capart	Argentina	48.45	Q
8	2	Moisés del Castillo	Peru	48.78	q
9	2	Alejandro Krauss	Chile	49.41	
10	2	Eulogio Medina	Uruguay	49.44	
11	1	Jorge Cotito	Peru	49.70	
12	1	Pablo Duré	Paraguay	49.95	
13	1	Luis Cabral	Uruguay	50.22	
14	2	Javier Rodríguez	Ecuador	50.36	
15	1	Fabián Almeida	Ecuador	50.37	
16	2	Marcelo Rejas	Bolivia	52.00	

Final – 13 September

Rank	Name	Nationality	Time	Notes
1st place, gold medalist(s)	Héctor Daley	Panama	46.06	CR
2nd place, silver medalist(s)	Sérgio Menezes	Brazil	46.53	
3rd place, bronze medalist(s)	Aaron Phillips	Venezuela	46.66	
4	Wilson dos Santos	Brazil	47.16	
5	José María Beduino	Argentina	47.27	
6	Carlos Morales	Chile	47.69	
7	Gustavo Capart	Argentina	48.21	
8	Moisés del Castillo	Peru	48.58	

=== 800 metres ===
Heats – 14 September

Rank	Heat	Name	Nationality	Time	Notes
1	2	Luis Migueles	Argentina	1:50.68	Q
2	2	Rinaldo Gomes	Brazil	1:50.85	Q
3	2	Manuel Balmaceda	Chile	1:51.17	Q
4	2	Abel Segura	Colombia	1:51.41	q
5	1	Igor Costa	Brazil	1:51.88	Q
6	1	Cristián Molina	Chile	1:51.91	Q
7	1	Raúl López	Argentina	1:52.28	Q
8	1	Eulogio Medina	Uruguay	1:52.61	q
9	1	Miguel Marcano	Venezuela	1:53.75	
10	1	Francisco Figueredo	Paraguay	1:58.58	
11	2	Vicente Medina	Paraguay	1:58.67	
12	1	Jorge Cotito	Peru	2:04.91	

Final – 15 September

Rank	Name	Nationality	Time	Notes
1st place, gold medalist(s)	Luis Migueles	Argentina	1:46.90	CR
2nd place, silver medalist(s)	Igor Costa	Brazil	1:47.61	
3rd place, bronze medalist(s)	Rinaldo Gomes	Brazil	1:49.35	
4	Cristián Molina	Chile	1:49.90	
5	Abel Segura	Colombia	1:50.54	
6	Eulogio Medina	Uruguay	1:51.52	
7	Manuel Balmaceda	Chile	1:51.88	
8	Raúl López	Argentina	1:52.18	

=== 1500 metres ===
13 September

Rank	Name	Nationality	Time	Notes
1st place, gold medalist(s)	Adauto Domingues	Brazil	3:42.16	CR
2nd place, silver medalist(s)	Emilio Ulloa	Chile	3:43.63	
3rd place, bronze medalist(s)	Ricardo Vera	Uruguay	3:46.87	
4	Abel Segura	Colombia	3:48.26	
5	Abel Godoy	Uruguay	3:51.44	
6	Jorge Rojas	Chile	3:52.76	
7	Rinaldo Gomes	Brazil	3:54.49	
8	José Martínez	Venezuela	3:54.84	
9	Marcelo Cascabelo	Argentina	3:56.35	
10	Raúl López	Argentina	3:57.63	
11	Alfredo Cilloniz	Peru	4:00.56	
12	Vicente Medina	Paraguay	4:06.88	

=== 5000 metres ===
14 September

Rank	Name	Nationality	Time	Notes
1st place, gold medalist(s)	Omar Aguilar	Chile	13:53.69	CR
2nd place, silver medalist(s)	Silvio Salazar	Colombia	14:03.18	
3rd place, bronze medalist(s)	João de Souza	Brazil	14:09.43	
4	Jorge Rojas	Chile	14:11.36	
5	Juan Pablo Juárez	Argentina	14:22.82	
6	Florindo Correia	Brazil	14:30.07	
7	Roberto Wendorff	Argentina	14:32.62	
8	Abel Godoy	Uruguay	14:52.18	
9	Ramón López	Paraguay	14:55.81	
10	Alfredo Cilloniz	Peru	14:57.51	
11	Félix Inado	Peru	14:57.59	

=== 10,000 metres ===
12 September

Rank	Name	Nationality	Time	Notes
1st place, gold medalist(s)	Omar Aguilar	Chile	28:39.90	CR
2nd place, silver medalist(s)	João de Souza	Brazil	29:02.34	
3rd place, bronze medalist(s)	Silvio Salazar	Colombia	29:03.34	
4	Julio César Gómez	Argentina	29:33.66	
5	Juan Pablo Juárez	Argentina	29:36.82	
6	Florindo Correia	Brazil	29:57.03	
7	Juan Jofre	Chile	30:15.81	
8	Ramón López	Paraguay	30:33.43	
9	Eladio Fernández	Paraguay	31:04.84	

=== Marathon ===
15 September

Rank	Name	Nationality	Time	Notes
1st place, gold medalist(s)	Eloy Schleder	Brazil	2:22:13	
2nd place, silver medalist(s)	José San Martín	Chile	2:24:10	
3rd place, bronze medalist(s)	Mauricio Arancibia	Chile	2:26:41	
4	Eladio Fernández	Paraguay	2:31:31	
5	Horacio Useglio	Argentina	2:31:37	
6	Nelson Zamora	Uruguay	2:32:58	
7	Carlos Orué	Argentina	2:38:59	
8	Juan Carlos Díaz	Chile	2:30:56	
9	Luis Vera	Chile	2:35:35	
10	Manuel Centurión	Argentina	2:41:33	
11	Sergio D'Angelo	Argentina	2:50:32	

=== 110 metres hurdles ===
Heats – 12 September
Wind:
Heat 1: +0.5 m/s, Heat 2: +0.3 m/s

Rank	Heat	Name	Nationality	Time	Notes
1	1	George Biehl	Chile	14.37	Q
2	2	Pedro Chiamulera	Brazil	14.24	Q
3	1	Joilto Bonfim	Brazil	14.41	Q
4	1	Carlos Varas	Argentina	14.52	Q
5	2	Andrés Lyon	Chile	14.75	Q
6	2	Javier Olivar	Uruguay	15.00	Q
7	1	José Duque	Venezuela	15.16	q
8	1	Harry Franco	Uruguay	16.05	q
9	2	Esteban Gorostiaga	Paraguay	16.41	
10	1	Ricardo Valiente	Peru	16.68	

Final – 13 September

Wind: -0.1 m/s

Rank	Name	Nationality	Time	Notes
1st place, gold medalist(s)	Pedro Chiamulera	Brazil	13.87	AR
2nd place, silver medalist(s)	Joilto Bonfim	Brazil	14.21	
3rd place, bronze medalist(s)	George Biehl	Chile	14.40	
4	Carlos Varas	Argentina	14.61	
5	Andrés Lyon	Chile	14.63	
6	Javier Olivar	Uruguay	14.94	
7	José Duque	Venezuela	14.96	
8	Harry Franco	Uruguay	16.11	

=== 400 metres hurdles ===
Heats – 14 September

Rank	Heat	Name	Nationality	Time	Notes
1	2	Pedro Chiamulera	Brazil	51.31	Q
2	2	Wilfredo Ferrer	Venezuela	51.86	Q
3	1	Antônio Ferreira	Brazil	52.04	Q
4	2	Rodrigo de la Fuente	Chile	52.26	Q
5	1	Pablo Squella	Chile	52.86	Q
6	1	Jorge Díaz	Argentina	53.01	Q
7	1	José Castillo	Venezuela	53.19	q
8	2	Sebastián Valcarce	Argentina	53.37	q
9	2	Javier Olivar	Uruguay	53.61	
10	1	Carlos Lima	Uruguay	54.42	
11	1	Alberto Izu	Peru	54.42	
12	2	Fernando Valiente	Peru	54.92	
13	2	Javier Rodríguez	Ecuador	55.30	

Final – 15 September

Rank	Name	Nationality	Time	Notes
1st place, gold medalist(s)	Pedro Chiamulera	Brazil	49.71	CR
2nd place, silver medalist(s)	Antônio Ferreira	Brazil	50.36	
3rd place, bronze medalist(s)	Wilfredo Ferrer	Venezuela	51.36	
4	Rodrigo de la Fuente	Chile	51.45	
5	Pablo Squella	Chile	52.44	
6	José Castillo	Venezuela	52.59	
7	Jorge Díaz	Argentina	52.66	
8	Sebastián Valcarce	Argentina	53.32	

=== 3000 metres steeplechase ===
15 September

Rank	Name	Nationality	Time	Notes
1st place, gold medalist(s)	Adauto Domingues	Brazil	8:44.38	CR
2nd place, silver medalist(s)	Ricardo Vera	Uruguay	8:44.85	
3rd place, bronze medalist(s)	Emilio Ulloa	Chile	8:45.27	
4	Marcelo Cascabelo	Argentina	9:00.49	
5	Luis Palma	Chile	9:02.52	
6	Wilson de Santana	Brazil	9:08.23	
7	Ramón López	Paraguay	9:12.89	
8	José Martínez	Venezuela	9:13.60	
9	Carlos Naput	Argentina	9:20.30	

=== 4 × 100 metres relay ===
13 September

Rank	Nation	Competitors	Time	Notes
1st place, gold medalist(s)	Brazil	Olivier Cadier, Arnaldo da Silva, Paulo Lima, Robson da Silva	40.00	
2nd place, silver medalist(s)	Chile	Boris Mihovilovic, Luis Sáez, Carlos Moreno, Álvaro Prenafeta	40.69	
3rd place, bronze medalist(s)	Venezuela	Wilfredo Ferrer, Enrique Canavire, José Mirena, Nelson Oquendo	40.87	
4	Argentina	Hugo Alzamora, Gustavo Capart, José María Beduino, Oscar Barrionuevo	41.17	
5	Peru	Fernando Valiente, Marco Mautino, Moisés del Castillo, Giorgio Mautino	41.54	
6	Uruguay	Jorge Reboiras, Javier Olivar, Luis Dorrego, Luis Cabral	42.31	
7	Ecuador	Javier Rodríguez, Julio Guerrero, Fabián Almeida, Bolívar Luzuriaga	43.94	
8	Paraguay	Luis Villalba, Pablo Duré, Esteban Gorostiaga, Julio Arriola	44.01	

=== 4 × 400 metres relay ===
15 September

Rank	Nation	Competitors	Time	Notes
1st place, gold medalist(s)	Brazil	Igor Costa, Pedro Chiamulera, Wilson dos Santos, Sérgio Menezes	3:07.96	CR
2nd place, silver medalist(s)	Argentina	Gustavo Capart, Luis Migueles, Oscar Barrionuevo, José María Beduino	3:10.21	
3rd place, bronze medalist(s)	Venezuela	José Castillo, Wilfredo Ferrer, Miguel Marcano, Aaron Phillips	3:11.29	
4	Chile	Carlos Morales, Eduardo Fuentes, Alejandro Krauss, Rodrigo de la Fuente	3:11.32	
5	Uruguay	Luis Cabral, Carlos Lima, Harry Franco, Eulogio Medina	3:17.55	

=== 20 kilometres walk ===
14 September

Rank	Name	Nationality	Time	Notes
1st place, gold medalist(s)	Jorge Yannone	Argentina	1:39:04	
2nd place, silver medalist(s)	Juan Yañez	Venezuela	1:42:23	
3rd place, bronze medalist(s)	Jorge Torrealba	Venezuela	1:45:41	
4	Eloy Quispe	Bolivia	1:47:38	
5	Eliu Barrera	Chile	1:49:32	
6	Jorge Linari	Argentina	1:54:04	
7	Héctor Guerra	Chile	2:05:01	

=== High jump ===
13 September

Rank	Name	Nationality	Result	Notes
1st place, gold medalist(s)	Milton Francisco	Brazil	2.17	CR
2nd place, silver medalist(s)	Fernando Pastoriza	Argentina	2.11	
3rd place, bronze medalist(s)	Cláudio Freire	Brazil	2.08	
4	Heriberto Corrales	Chile	2.08	PB
5	Pablo Román	Chile	2.05	
6	Horacio Acevedo	Argentina	2.05	
7	Juan Carlos Silva	Uruguay	2.00	
8	Fernando Valiente	Peru	2.00	
9	Ricardo Valiente	Peru	1.90	

=== Pole vault ===
12 September

Rank	Name	Nationality	Result	Notes
1st place, gold medalist(s)	Oscar Veit	Argentina	4.90	=CR
2nd place, silver medalist(s)	Jaime Silva	Chile	4.80	
3rd place, bronze medalist(s)	Elson de Souza	Brazil	4.80	
4	Renato Bortolocci	Brazil	4.80	
5	Manuel Fuentes	Venezuela	4.50	
6	Daniel Prieto	Chile	4.40	
7	Walter Franzantti	Argentina	4.20	

=== Long jump ===
12 September

Rank	Name	Nationality	Result	Notes
1st place, gold medalist(s)	Enrique Canavire	Venezuela	7.54	
2nd place, silver medalist(s)	Olivier Cadier	Brazil	7.46	
3rd place, bronze medalist(s)	Sergio Roh	Argentina	7.20	
4	Fernando Brito	Brazil	7.05	
5	Francisco Pichott	Chile	6.92	
6	José Mirena	Venezuela	6.88	
7	Óscar Ham	Chile	6.87	
8	Carlos Alarcón	Argentina	6.82	
9	Fernando Valiente	Peru	6.78	

=== Triple jump ===
15 September

Rank	Name	Nationality	Result	Notes
1st place, gold medalist(s)	Francisco dos Santos	Brazil	16.87	
2nd place, silver medalist(s)	Jailto Bonfim	Brazil	16.06	
3rd place, bronze medalist(s)	Roberto Audain	Venezuela	15.62	
4	Francisco Pichott	Chile	15.33	
5	Angel Gagliano	Argentina	14.87	
6	Fernando Kraemer	Chile	14.74	
7	Ricardo Valiente	Peru	14.73	
8	Juan Carlos Silva	Uruguay	13.61	

=== Shot put ===
14 September

Rank	Name	Nationality	Result	Notes
1st place, gold medalist(s)	Gert Weil	Chile	20.14	CR
2nd place, silver medalist(s)	Adilson Oliveira	Brazil	17.13	
3rd place, bronze medalist(s)	José Jara	Chile	16.20	
4	Otmar Welsch	Brazil	15.97	
5	Gerardo Carucci	Argentina	15.73	
6	Oscar Peñalba	Argentina	14.83	
7	Óscar Gadea	Uruguay	14.47	
8	Alberto Auad	Ecuador	13.13	

=== Discus throw ===
13 September

Rank	Name	Nationality	Result	Notes
1st place, gold medalist(s)	José de Souza	Brazil	53.10	
2nd place, silver medalist(s)	Carlos Brynner	Argentina	51.60	
3rd place, bronze medalist(s)	Otmar Welsch	Brazil	50.92	
4	Oscar Peñalba	Argentina	50.62	
5	Gert Weil	Chile	50.52	
6	Roberto Pesqueira	Chile	44.92	
7	Óscar Gadea	Uruguay	40.28	
8	Ramón Jiménez Gaona	Paraguay	39.16	

=== Hammer throw ===
14 September

Rank	Name	Nationality	Result	Notes
1st place, gold medalist(s)	Daniel Gómez	Argentina	60.26	
2nd place, silver medalist(s)	Celso de Moraes	Brazil	60.20	
3rd place, bronze medalist(s)	Pedro Rivail Atílio	Brazil	60.04	
4	Gabriel Tomasi	Argentina	54.76	
5	Víctor Guerrero	Chile	52.68	
6	Humberto Cáceres	Chile	50.24	
7	Raúl Ramón	Ecuador	48.74	

=== Javelin throw ===
12 September – Old model

Rank	Name	Nationality	Result	Notes
1st place, gold medalist(s)	Juan Francisco Garmendia	Argentina	75.10	CR
2nd place, silver medalist(s)	Luis Lucumí	Colombia	70.64	
3rd place, bronze medalist(s)	Gustavo Wielandt	Chile	70.30	
4	Amílcar de Barros	Brazil	67.62	
5	José Carlos de Lima e Souza	Brazil	66.14	
6	Jesús López	Argentina	66.14	
7	Marco Talavera	Paraguay	59.76	
8	Claudio Escauriza	Paraguay	58.86	

=== Decathlon ===
12–13 September

The highest mark recorded in each event is highlighted in yellow

Rank	Athlete	Nationality	100m	LJ	SP	HJ	400m	110m H	DT	PV	JT	1500m	Points	Notes
1st place, gold medalist(s)	Paulo Lima	Brazil	11.03	6.96	13.94	1.95	48.39	16.28	40.46	4.20	50.78	4:43.01	7341	
2nd place, silver medalist(s)	Carlos Martín	Argentina	11.44	6.71	12.81	1.92	50.44	16.30	39.50	3.80	44.44	4:44.84	6764	
3rd place, bronze medalist(s)	Claudio Escauriza	Paraguay	11.65	6.81	13.20	1.77	54.88	17.24	43.68	4.30	63.58	5:31.60	6599	
4	Fernando Fondello	Argentina	11.78	6.59	11.99	1.89	52.53	16.80	37.74	3.60	50.20	4:50.59	6406	
5	Pedro da Silva	Brazil	11.15	NM	12.68	2.01	53.46	14.88	38.88	4.50	55.26	5:15.95	6354	
6	Leonel Rojas	Chile	11.67	6.65	10.51	1.71	52.85	16.56	33.12	4.10	50.78	4:53.20	6247	
7	Julio Arriola	Paraguay	11.89	6.30	10.69	1.59	51.64	17.03	36.36	3.40	53.76	4:49.02	5988	
8	Tómas Riether	Chile	11.42	6.32	10.83	1.71	52.14	18.11	31.42	4.10	39.84	5:25.38	5746	
9	Dean Torres	Ecuador	12.19	6.09	6.56	1.71	53.47	19.34	21.40	4.00	32.92	4:40.50	5051	

== Women's results ==
=== 100 metres ===
Heats – 12 September
Wind:
Heat 1: -0.5 m/s, Heat 2: -0.2 m/s

Rank	Heat	Name	Nationality	Time	Notes
1	1	Patricia Pérez	Chile	11.78	Q
2	1	Bárbara do Nascimento	Brazil	12.13	Q
3	2	Claudiléia dos Santos	Brazil	12.16	Q
4	2	Daisy Salas	Chile	12.22	Q
5	1	Liliana Chalá	Ecuador	12.23	Q
6	1	Julia Schuth	Argentina	12.37	q
7	1	Claudia Acerenza	Uruguay	12.40	q
8	2	Andrea Barabino	Argentina	12.43	Q
9	2	Adriana Andrade	Ecuador	12.78	

Final – 13 September

Wind: -0.6 m/s

Rank	Name	Nationality	Time	Notes
1st place, gold medalist(s)	Patricia Pérez	Chile	11.78	
2nd place, silver medalist(s)	Claudiléia dos Santos	Brazil	12.02	
3rd place, bronze medalist(s)	Daisy Salas	Chile	12.11	
4	Bárbara do Nascimento	Brazil	12.25	
5	Liliana Chalá	Ecuador	12.29	
6	Julia Schuth	Argentina	12.37	
7	Claudia Acerenza	Uruguay	12.42	
8	Andrea Barabino	Argentina	12.45	

=== 200 metres ===
Heats – 14 September
Wind:
Heat 1: -0.5 m/s, Heat 2: +1.0 m/s

Rank	Heat	Name	Nationality	Time	Notes
1	1	Claudiléia dos Santos	Brazil	24.33	Q
2	1	Liliana Chalá	Ecuador	24.51	Q
3	2	Margarita Grün	Uruguay	24.59	Q
4	2	Daisy Salas	Chile	24.60	Q
5	1	Patricia Pérez	Chile	24.66	Q
6	1	Claudia Acerenza	Uruguay	25.01	q
7	2	Inés Ribeiro	Brazil	25.08	Q
8	1	Andrea Barabino	Argentina	25.42	q
9	2	Graciela Palacín	Argentina	25.44	
10	2	Valeria López	Ecuador	26.17	

Final – 15 September

Wind: +0.4 m/s

Rank	Name	Nationality	Time	Notes
1st place, gold medalist(s)	Claudiléia dos Santos	Brazil	23.99	
2nd place, silver medalist(s)	Patricia Pérez	Chile	24.13	
3rd place, bronze medalist(s)	Liliana Chalá	Ecuador	24.26	
4	Daisy Salas	Chile	24.36	PB
5	Margarita Grün	Uruguay	24.47	
6	Claudia Acerenza	Uruguay	24.73	
7	Inés Ribeiro	Brazil	25.01	
8	Andrea Barabino	Argentina	25.44	

=== 400 metres ===
Heats – 12 September

Rank	Heat	Name	Nationality	Time	Notes
1	1	Norfalia Carabalí	Colombia	54.16	Q
2	1	Maria do Carmo Fialho	Brazil	54.85	Q
3	1	Carmen Mosegui	Uruguay	55.06	Q
4	2	Elba Barbosa	Brazil	55.36	Q
5	2	Margarita Grün	Uruguay	56.13	Q
6	1	Ismenia Guzmán	Chile	56.28	q
7	1	Laura de Falco	Argentina	56.90	q
8	2	Flavia Villar	Chile	57.01	Q
9	2	Andrea Fuchs	Argentina	58.13	
10	2	Valeria López	Ecuador	59.61	
11	2	Susana Quintana	Peru	1:00.15	

Final – 13 September

Rank	Name	Nationality	Time	Notes
1st place, gold medalist(s)	Norfalia Carabalí	Colombia	53.25	CR
2nd place, silver medalist(s)	Elba Barbosa	Brazil	54.36	
3rd place, bronze medalist(s)	Margarita Grün	Uruguay	54.39	NR
4	Maria do Carmo Fialho	Brazil	54.47	
5	Carmen Mosegui	Uruguay	55.22	
6	Ismenia Guzmán	Chile	56.24	
7	Flavia Villar	Chile	56.32	
8	Laura de Falco	Argentina	57.06	

=== 800 metres ===
15 September

Rank	Name	Nationality	Time	Notes
1st place, gold medalist(s)	Alejandra Ramos	Chile	2:03.54	CR
2nd place, silver medalist(s)	Soraya Telles	Brazil	2:06.30	
3rd place, bronze medalist(s)	Elba Barbosa	Brazil	2:09.21	
4	Graciela Mardones	Chile	2:10.78	
5	Carmen Mosegui	Uruguay	2:11.02	
6	Nora Wiedemer	Argentina	2:11.56	
7	Viviana Cortez	Argentina	2:21.30	

=== 1500 metres ===
13 September

Rank	Name	Nationality	Time	Notes
1st place, gold medalist(s)	Alejandra Ramos	Chile	4:20.16	CR
2nd place, silver medalist(s)	Mónica Regonesi	Chile	4:22.45	
3rd place, bronze medalist(s)	Fabiola Rueda	Colombia	4:22.63	
4	Liliana Góngora	Argentina	4:25.00	
5	Soraya Telles	Brazil	4:25.87	
6	Jorilda Sabino	Brazil	4:27.69	
7	Ruth Jaime	Peru	4:38.90	
8	Paola Patrón	Uruguay	4:46.04	

=== 3000 metres ===
14 September

Rank	Name	Nationality	Time	Notes
1st place, gold medalist(s)	Mónica Regonesi	Chile	9:29.67	CR
2nd place, silver medalist(s)	Carmem de Oliveira	Brazil	9:30.37	
3rd place, bronze medalist(s)	Fabiola Rueda	Colombia	9:31.10	
4	Jorilda Sabino	Brazil	9:32.54	
5	Liliana Góngora	Argentina	9:35.12	
6	Margot Vargas	Argentina	9:54.96	
7	Ruth Jaime	Peru	9:56.15	
8	Ariela Bergamini	Chile	10:07.07	
9	Paola Patrón	Uruguay	10:14.16	

=== 10,000 metres ===
15 September

Rank	Name	Nationality	Time	Notes
1st place, gold medalist(s)	Mónica Regonesi	Chile	34:31.37	AR
2nd place, silver medalist(s)	Carmem de Oliveira	Brazil	34:31.37	
3rd place, bronze medalist(s)	Margot Vargas	Argentina	36:16.80	
4	Marisela de Díaz	Venezuela	36:37.29	
5	Ruth Jaime	Peru	37:04.46	
6	Stella Selles	Argentina	38:40.53	

=== 100 metres hurdles ===
13 September
Wind: +0.5 m/s

Rank	Name	Nationality	Time	Notes
1st place, gold medalist(s)	Beatriz Capotosto	Argentina	13.87	
2nd place, silver medalist(s)	Susana Jenkins	Argentina	13.94	
3rd place, bronze medalist(s)	Juraciara da Silva	Brazil	13.97	
4	Conceição Geremias	Brazil	14.15	
5	Claudia Oxman	Chile	14.36	

=== 400 metres hurdles ===
15 September

Rank	Name	Nationality	Time	Notes
1st place, gold medalist(s)	Maria do Carmo Fialho	Brazil	59.45	CR
2nd place, silver medalist(s)	Cornelia Holzinger	Brazil	1:00.28	
3rd place, bronze medalist(s)	Claudia Oxman	Chile	1:01.42	
4	Paulina Caroca	Chile	1:02.64	
5	Laura Arriarán	Argentina	1:03.62	
6	Susana Quintana	Peru	1:00.46	

=== 4 × 100 metres relay ===
13 September

Rank	Nation	Competitors	Time	Notes
1st place, gold medalist(s)	Chile	Daisy Salas, Flavia Villar, Michelle Camino, Patricia Pérez	45.80	
2nd place, silver medalist(s)	Brazil	Inês Antónia Ribeiro, Barbara Nascimento, Claudileia dos Santos, Juraciara da Silva	46.09	
3rd place, bronze medalist(s)	Argentina	Julia Schuth, Graciela Palacín, Susan Jenkins, Beatriz Capotosto	46.80	
4	Uruguay	Margarita Grün, Carmen Mosegui, Soledad Acerenza, Claudia Acerenza	46.80	
5	Ecuador	Yalile Moreira, Nancy Vallecilla, Adriana Andrade, Liliana Chalá	47.23	

=== 4 × 400 metres relay ===
15 September

Rank	Nation	Competitors	Time	Notes
1st place, gold medalist(s)	Brazil	Soraya Telles, Elba Barbosa, Cornelia Holzinguer, Maria do Carmo Fialho	3:39.77	CR
2nd place, silver medalist(s)	Uruguay	Margarita Grün, Carmen Mosegui, Claudia Acerenza, Soledad Acerenza	3:41.49	
3rd place, bronze medalist(s)	Chile	Flavia Villar, Ismenia Guzmán, Ximena Carvajal, Alejandra Ramos	3:43.85	
4	Argentina	María Elena Croatto, Julia Schuth, Andrea Fuchs, Laura de Falco	3:47.11	

=== High jump ===
15 September

Rank	Name	Nationality	Result	Notes
1st place, gold medalist(s)	Ana Maria Marcon	Brazil	1.88	CR
2nd place, silver medalist(s)	Carmen Garib	Chile	1.76	
3rd place, bronze medalist(s)	Conceição Geremias	Brazil	1.73	
4	Ana María Oliver	Argentina	1.70	
5	Leonor Carter	Chile	1.70	

=== Long jump ===
14 September

Rank	Name	Nationality	Result	Notes
1st place, gold medalist(s)	Conceição Geremias	Brazil	6.04	
2nd place, silver medalist(s)	Silvia Murialdo	Argentina	5.81	
3rd place, bronze medalist(s)	Graciela Acosta	Uruguay	5.81	
4	Silvina Pereira	Brazil	5.67	
5	Yalile Moreira	Ecuador	5.63	
6	Isabel Oliva	Chile	5.57	
7	Leonor Carter	Chile	5.46	

=== Shot put ===
13 September

Rank	Name	Nationality	Result	Notes
1st place, gold medalist(s)	Maria Fernandes	Brazil	14.89	
2nd place, silver medalist(s)	Jazmín Cirio	Chile	14.50	
3rd place, bronze medalist(s)	Marinalva dos Santos	Brazil	14.44	
4	Berenice da Silva	Uruguay	13.78	
5	Patricia Guerrero	Peru	12.93	
6	Rosa Molina	Chile	12.82	
7	Daphne Birnios	Argentina	12.68	
8	Liliana Olguín	Argentina	12.37	

=== Discus throw ===
14 September

Rank	Name	Nationality	Result	Notes
1st place, gold medalist(s)	Márcia Barbosa	Brazil	46.16	
2nd place, silver medalist(s)	Marinalva dos Santos	Brazil	43.50	
3rd place, bronze medalist(s)	Daphne Birnios	Argentina	42.20	
4	Liliana Olguín	Argentina	42.18	
5	Elvira Yufra	Peru	41.48	
6	Verónica Díaz	Chile	41.16	
7	Gloria Martínez	Chile	40.90	

=== Javelin throw ===
15 September – Old model

Rank	Name	Nationality	Result	Notes
1st place, gold medalist(s)	Mónica Rocha	Brazil	52.08	CR
2nd place, silver medalist(s)	Sueli dos Santos	Brazil	51.52	
3rd place, bronze medalist(s)	Patricia Guerrero	Peru	45.38	
4	Sonia Favre	Argentina	44.62	
5	Eugenia Urra	Chile	44.50	
6	Ana María Campillay	Argentina	43.06	
7	Verónica Díaz	Chile	40.10	

=== Heptathlon ===
10–11 September

The highest mark recorded in each event is highlighted in yellow

Rank	Athlete	Nationality	100m H	HJ	SP	200m	LJ	JT	800m	Points	Notes
1st place, gold medalist(s)	Ana María Comaschi	Argentina	14.83	1.48	10.93	25.76	5.27	38.18	2:27.20	4866	
2nd place, silver medalist(s)	Nancy Vallecilla	Ecuador	13.71	1.66	10.52	25.17	5.71	NM	2:18.64	4865	
3rd place, bronze medalist(s)	Rita Geremias	Brazil	15.52	1.57	9.03	26.84	5.47	33.88	2:23.53	4710	
4	María Esther Mediano	Chile	14.71	1.60	10.20	27.32	5.42	32.44	2:39.36	4624	
5	Claudia Brien	Chile	15.80	1.60	12.68	28.84	4.87	38.06	2:40.66	4466	
6	Ingrid Meilicker	Paraguay	16.05	1.54	8.91	26.75	5.21	33.72	2:41.48	4285	
7	Ana María Destéfanis	Argentina	16.32	1.51	11.08	28.61	4.98	30.86	2:32.15	4205	
8	Lucy Agüero	Paraguay	18.24	1.48	9.19	29.59	4.56	37.86	2:47.83	3606	
