= Athletics at the 1987 Summer Universiade – Men's 800 metres =

The men's 800 metres event at the 1987 Summer Universiade was held at the Stadion Maksimir in Zagreb on 14, 15 and 16 July 1987.

== Medalists ==
Gold	Silver	Bronze
Slobodan Popović; Yugoslavia	Moussa Fall; Senegal	Luis Toledo; Mexico

== Results ==
=== Heats ===
Rank	Heat	Athlete	Nationality	Time	Notes
1	1	Alberto Barsotti	Italy	1:49.05	Q
2	1	Ibrahim Okash	Somalia	1:49.17	Q
3	1	Alex Geissbühler	Switzerland	1:50.15	Q
4	1	Ove Talsnes	Norway	1:51.97	
5	1	David Montañez	Puerto Rico	1:54.05	
6	1	Jorge Fidel Ponce	Honduras	2:00.38	
7	1	Lee Ka Kit	Hong Kong	2:07.52	
1	2	Manuel Balmaceda	Chile	1:50.17	Q
2	2	Ryu Tae-kyung	South Korea	1:50.24	Q
3	2	Brian Thompson	Canada	1:50.30	Q
4	2	Raivo Mägi	Soviet Union	1:50.67	q
1	3	Moussa Fall	Senegal	1:49.34	Q
2	3	Luis Toledo	Mexico	1:49.39	Q
3	3	Miles Irish	United States	1:51.47	Q
4	3	Luis Martínez	Guatemala	1:51.47	
5	3	Faiz Ould Abdallah	Mauritania	2:07.25	
1	4	Paul Osland	Canada	1:58.56	Q
2	4	Valeriy Starodubtsev	Soviet Union	2:00.11	Q
3	4	Chris McGeorge	Great Britain	2:00.27	Q
4	4	Hugo Sánchez	Costa Rica	2:00.52	
1	5	Slobodan Popović	Yugoslavia	1:50.65	Q
2	5	Yoshikazu Arata	Japan	1:50.67	Q
3	5	Miguel Rodríguez	Puerto Rico	1:52.55	Q
4	5	Eugene Curran	Ireland	1:55.64	
5	5	Mohamed El Moctar	Mauritania	2:04.49	
	5	Colvis Samuels	Guyana	DNF	
1	6	Rob Harrison	Great Britain	1:50.13	Q
2	6	Milan Drahoňovský	Czechoslovakia	1:50.16	Q
1	7	Tracy Baskin	United States	1:51.82	Q
?	?	Pablo Squella	Chile	?:??.??	Q
?	?	Eduardo Cabrera	Mexico	?:??.??	Q
?	?	Syed Meesaq Rizvi	Pakistan	?:??.??	Q
?	?	Saša Stojilović	Yugoslavia	?:??.??	Q

=== Semifinals ===
Rank	Heat	Athlete	Nationality	Time	Notes
1	1	Moussa Fall	Senegal	1:47.36	Q
2	1	Luis Toledo	Mexico	1:47.45	Q
3	1	Chris McGeorge	Great Britain	1:47.54	q
4	1	Miles Irish	United States	1:47.67	q
5	1	Milan Drahoňovský	Czechoslovakia	1:47.96	
6	1	Brian Thompson	Canada	1:48.09	
7	3	Slobodan Popović	Yugoslavia	1:48.96	Q
8	3	Manuel Balmaceda	Chile	1:49.21	Q
9	3	Tracy Baskin	United States	1:49.33	
10	1	Raivo Mägi	Soviet Union	1:49.85	
11	3	Paul Osland	Canada	1:50.30	
12	3	Alberto Barsotti	Italy	1:50.47	
13	3	Ryu Tae-kyung	South Korea	1:50.55	
14	2	Ibrahim Okash	Somalia	1:50.68	Q
15	2	Valeriy Starodubtsev	Soviet Union	1:50.79	Q
16	1	Miguel Rodríguez	Puerto Rico	1:51.05	
17	3	Eduardo Cabrera	Mexico	1:51.08	
18	2	Pablo Squella	Chile	1:51.14	
19	2	Alex Geissbühler	Switzerland	1:51.16	
20	2	Saša Stojilović	Yugoslavia	1:51.39	
21	2	Yoshikazu Arata	Japan	1:52.13	
22	3	Syed Meesaq Rizvi	Pakistan	1:52.81	
	?	Rob Harrison	Great Britain	?	

=== Final ===
Rank	Athlete	Nationality	Time	Notes
1st place, gold medalist(s)	Slobodan Popović	Yugoslavia	1:46.13	
2nd place, silver medalist(s)	Moussa Fall	Senegal	1:46.71	
3rd place, bronze medalist(s)	Luis Toledo	Mexico	1:47.07	
4	Manuel Balmaceda	Chile	1:47.37	
5	Ibrahim Okash	Somalia	1:47.81	
6	Miles Irish	United States	1:47.94	
7	Valeriy Starodubtsev	Soviet Union	1:48.02	
8	Chris McGeorge	Great Britain	1:48.07	
