= Hector Vazquez Muñiz =

Puerto Rican sportscaster and show host

Secretary of Sports and Recreation of Puerto Rico
- Incumbent
- Assumed office January 7, 2025
- Governor: Jenniffer González
- Preceded by: Ray Quiñones

Personal details
- Born: Caguas, Puerto Rico
- Party: New Progressive Party
- Education: Universidad del Sagrado Corazón (BA); Hofstra University

Hector Vazquez Muñiz is a Puerto Rican television sportscaster and journalist and radio programs producer. Muñiz is the sports anchorman at Telemundo Puerto Rico's "Telenoticias Fin de Semana" ("Television News Weekend Edition"), which is transmitted on weekend days at 5 PM and 10 PM. A controversial host, he has been accused, among other things, of being racist. He also has a radio talk show named "A Swing Completo con Vazquez Muñiz".

Muñiz covers association football and volleyball games on Puerto Rican television, but he is best known for his coverage of baseball, and some of his best-known phrases are "Y se va, y se va, y se fue!" ("It's going! it's going! it's gone!", which he pronounces similar to Chris Berman's phrase of "Back, back, back, gone!") whenever someone hits a home-run, and "Y se les esta haciendo tarde!" ("It's getting too late for them") which he says when a baseball team is down by many runs on the scoreboard late in the game.

== Early life ==
Hector Vazquez Muñiz was born in Caguas, Puerto Rico. He is the son of Héctor Rafael Vázquez, who was also a sportscaster. His father and his uncle Johnny Vazquez were the owners of the Criollos de Caguas baseball team, a team that is the most successful baseball team, championships-wise, in Puerto Rico's baseball history, and which Vazquez Muñiz himself later joined as their official radio sportscaster. He earned a Bachelor degree in communications from Universidad del Sagrado Corazón.

== Career ==
Vazquez Muñiz has had a long career in Puerto Rican media. From 1993 to 2012, he worked as a sports news editor for WKAQ AM 580 radio. By 1997, he had joined the staff of "Mira Que TVO", a Telemundo Internacional candid camera type of show, as a show host.

Vazquez Muñiz has a column in the Primera Hora newspaper in Puerto Rico, named "Se Prendió el Fogón" ("The Heat is On!"), where he discusses many sports, mainly baseball.

He has also been a long-time Telemundo Puerto Rico sportscaster.

=== Controversies ===
In 2004, Vazquez Muñiz was fired from Telemundo Puerto Rico for expressing his opinion about a car company on the air. He was rehired by the channel in 2014.

During the 2018 Central American and Caribbean Games in Barranquilla, Colombia, Vazquez Muñiz was assigned to cover the games for Telemundo Puerto Rico. During the judo gold medal competition between Cuban athlete, 2012 London Olympics champion Idalys Ortiz and Puerto Rican competitor Melissa Mojica, Vazquez Muñiz made a commentary saying that "Yo no sabia que en Cuba hay osos! Eso es un oso!" ("I had no idea that Cuba has bears! That is a bear!) referring to Ortiz, who is black. He had many defenders, including Mojica, who went on twitter and declared that she felt that he did not use the bear term to offend her or her rival. "That wasn't his intention", she declared publicly.

Among other defenders, there was also Annabel Guillen, the then president of a group that advocates for Puerto Rico's statehood named "Igualdad", who stated that "(We've had) enough with the persecution of newspaper reporters and public figures because of their favoring of statehood (for Puerto Rico) on a personal level, like the majority of the (Puerto Rican) citizenship! We reclaim the reestablishment of Vazquez Muñiz as a laborer, it is what is fair and correct, otherwise, we are calling upon Igualdad members and all statehood supporters to boycott the channel (Telemundo Puerto Rico) and all of their programming!" she said in a public statement. According to Guillen, Vazquez Muñiz is a backer of the ideal of statehood for Puerto Rico.

Eventually, Vazquez Muñiz was reinstated by Telemundo Puerto Rico.

=== Secretary of Sports and Recreation of Puerto Rico ===
On february 7 2025, Hector Vazquez Muñiz was appointed Secretary of the Puerto Rico Department of Sports and Recreation by governor Jenniffer González.

== See also ==
- List of Puerto Ricans
- Rafael Bracero
- Junior Abrams
- Fufi Santori
- Rickin Sanchez
- Norman H. Davila
- Ed Trucco -who broadcast BMX races during his youth in Puerto Rico
- Manolo Rivera Morales
- Ernesto Diaz Gonzalez
- Ramiro Martinez
