= 1985 South American Junior Championships in Athletics =

XVII South American Junior Championships in Athletics
- Dates: November 21–24
- Host city: Santa Fe, Argentina
- Level: Under-20
- Events: 37
- Participation: about 206 athletes from 6 nations

The 17th South American Junior Championships in Athletics were held in Santa Fe, Argentina from November 21–24, 1985.

== Participation (unofficial) ==
Detailed result lists can be found on the "World Junior Athletics History" website. An unofficial count yields the number of about 206 athletes from about 6 countries: Argentina (55), Brazil (47), Chile (33), Paraguay (32), Peru (13).

== Medal summary ==
Medal winners are published for men and women Complete results can be found on the "World Junior Athletics History" website.

=== Men ===
Event	Gold		Silver		Bronze	
100 metres	Reginaldo Aguiar (BRA)	10.82	Carlos Moreno (CHI)	10.97	Gerardo Meinardi (ARG)	11.02
200 metres	Eduardo Fuentes (CHI)	21.67	Marcelo Brivilati da Silva (BRA)	21.74	Reginaldo Aguiar (BRA)	21.90
400 metres	Eduardo Fuentes (CHI)	48.03	Hélcio Reis (BRA)	48.32	André Oliveira (BRA)	48.54
800 metres	Manuel Balmaceda (CHI)	1:49.77	Antônio dos Santos (BRA)	1:50.38	Carlos Morales (CHI)	1:51.94
1500 metres	Manuel Balmaceda (CHI)	3:52.4	Antonio Silio (ARG)	3:54.6	Antônio dos Santos (BRA)	3:55.1
5000 metres	Antonio Silio (ARG)	14:38.59	Jaime Valenzuela (CHI)	14:42.16	Félix Inado (PER)	14:42.44
110 metres hurdles	Adilson Silva (BRA)	14.69	Lyndon Campos (BRA)	14.84	Fernando Cosio (CHI)	15.25
400 metres hurdles	Juan Enríquez (CHI)	53.14	Pedro Luiz Lopes (BRA)	53.16	Adilson Silva (BRA)	53.75
2000 metres steeplechase	Juan Meza (CHI)	5:47.56	Félix Inado (PER)	5:47.57	Pedro Graciotti (BRA)	5:52.48
4 × 100 metres relay	Brazil; Sérgio Moreira; Marcelo Brivilati da Silva; Hélcio Reis; Reginaldo Sanches	40.99	Argentina; Fabián Gómez; Rubén Sáiz; Claudio Bianchi; Gerardo Meinardi	41.61	Chile; Eduardo Fuentes; Carlos Morales; Carlos Moreno; Boris Miholovic	41.68
4 × 400 metres relay	Chile; Juan Énriquez; Manuel Balmaceda; Eduardo Fuentes; Carlos Morales	3:11.94	Brazil; Pedro Lopes; Sérgio Moreira; Hélcio Reis; André de Oliveira	3:14.99	Argentina; Pablo Vidal; Ariel Pintos; Gerardo Meinardi; Francisco Remmer	3:18.81
10,000 metres track walk	Marcelo Palma (BRA)	48:44.5	Antônio Köhler (BRA)	52:18.2	Benjamín Loréfice (ARG)	55:04.2
High jump	José Luís Mendes (BRA)	2.10	Luciano Bacelli (BRA)	2.03	Santiago Lozada (PER)	2.03
Pole vault	Martín Bossio (ARG)	4.40	Fernando Moreno (ARG)	4.00	Mauricio de Santiago (CHI)	3.80
Long jump	Pedro da Silva (BRA)	7.41	Sergio Roh (ARG)	7.27	Paulo de Oliveira (BRA)	7.25
Triple jump	Jorge da Silva (BRA)	15.41	Alejandro Gats (ARG)	15.12	Luiz Teixeira (BRA)	14.92
Shot put	Horacio Alaluf (ARG)	16.96	Fernando Figueirêdo (BRA)	16.65	Gonzalo Vázquez (CHI)	15.44
Discus throw	Rogério Cadori (BRA)	47.28	Jair do Carmo (BRA)	46.92	Julio Paladino (ARG)	45.54
Hammer throw	Gustavo Heger (ARG)	61.50	Andrés Charadía (ARG)	58.48	André Nogueira (BRA)	51.18
Javelin throw	Marcelo Knauss (ARG)	60.80	Luís Dyck (BRA)	59.04	Roberto do Carmo (BRA)	56.50
Decathlon	Pedro da Silva (BRA)	7443	Vladimir Damin (BRA)	6494	Rodrigo Retamal (ARG)	6094

=== Women ===
Event	Gold		Silver		Bronze	
100 metres	Rita Gomes (BRA)	12.05	Aline de Figueirêdo (BRA)	12.10	Isabel Oliva (CHI)	12.39
200 metres	Rita Gomes (BRA)	24.77	Claudia Acerenza (URU)	24.78	Soledad Acerenza (URU)	25.30
400 metres	María Elena Croatto (ARG)	54.80	María Mosegui (URU)	54.81	Ismenia Guzmán (CHI)	55.60
800 metres	Ana Nascimento (BRA)	2:10.35	Marilene Dantas (BRA)	2:10.47	Gina Toledo (CHI)	2:12.86
1500 metres	Rita de Jesus (BRA)	4:35.3	Célia dos Santos (BRA)	4:36.1	María Victoria Biondi (ARG)	4:36.3
3000 metres	Jorilda Sabino (BRA)	9:38.21	Célia dos Santos (BRA)	9:51.96	María Victoria Biondi (ARG)	9:54.66
100 metres hurdles	Clarice Kuhn (BRA)	14.63	Roberta Fernandes (BRA)	14.98	Carmen Bezanilla (CHI)	15.02
200 metres hurdles	Carmen Bezanilla (CHI)	28.42	Roberta Fernandes (BRA)	28.67	Clarice Kuhn (BRA)	29.14
4 × 100 metres relay	Uruguay; Carmen Mosegui; Margarita Martirena; Claudia Acerenza; Soledad Acerenza	47.72	Chile; Victoria Bacarezza; Ismenia Guzmán; Carmen Bezanilla; María Isabel Oliva	48.29	Argentina; Ana Capuano; Milagros Allende; Nancy Chemini; Mirta Forgione	48.61
4 × 400 metres relay	Uruguay; Inés Justet; Margarita Martirena; Claudia Acerenza; Soledad Acerenza	3:47.55	Brazil ? ? Marilene Dantas; Eliane Silva	3:49.20	Argentina; Ana Capuano; Fabiana Pianovi; María Croatto ?	3:50.02
High jump	Mônica Lunkmoss (BRA)	1.78	Ana María Olivar (ARG)	1.75	Leonor Carter (CHI)	1.66
Long jump	Silvia Murialdo (ARG)	5.83	Rita Slompo (BRA)	5.58	Isabel Oliva (CHI)	5.57
Shot put	Eliane de Campos (BRA)	13.98	Diana Dutczyn (ARG)	12.58	Claudia Brien (CHI)	12.51
Discus throw	Claudia Larenas (CHI)	43.56	Janine Barille (BRA)	41.90	Elvira Ruiz (PER)	39.62
Javelin throw	Mônica Rocha (BRA)	47.96	Patricia Yacoffani (ARG)	40.42	María Gamboa (ARG)	38.72
Heptathlon	Ana María Comaschi (ARG)	4769	Claudia Brien (CHI)	4564	Mônica Marques (BRA)	4522

== Medal table (unofficial) ==
* Host nation (Argentina)

Rank	Nation	Gold	Silver	Bronze	Total
1	Brazil (BRA)	18	21	11	50
2	Chile (CHI)	9	4	12	25
3	Argentina (ARG)*	8	9	10	27
4	Uruguay (URU)	2	2	1	5
5	Peru (PER)	0	1	3	4
Totals (5 entries)		37	37	37	111
