= Carlos Morales (athlete) =

Personal information
- Full name: Carlos Andrés Morales Herrera
- Born: 26 July 1966 (age 60)

Sport
- Sport: Athletics
- Event: 400 metres
Medal record
Representing Chile
South American Games
Gold medal – first place	1986 Santiago	400m
Gold medal – first place	1986 Santiago	4x400m relay
Gold medal – first place	1990 Lima	400m
Gold medal – first place	1990 Lima	4x400m relay
Silver medal – second place	1990 Lima	4x100m relay

Carlos Andrés Morales Herrera (born 26 July 1966) is a retired Chilean sprinter who competed primarily in the 400 metres. He represented his country at the 1991 World Championships in Tokyo advancing to the second round but ultimately not starting in it.

His personal best in the event is 46.40 set in 1988 in Mexico City.

== International competitions ==
Year	Competition	Venue	Position	Event	Notes
Representing Chile
1984	South American Junior Championships	Caracas, Venezuela	1st	400 m	48.0
1984	South American Junior Championships	Caracas, Venezuela	4th	4 × 100 m relay	43.78
1985	South American Championships	Santiago, Chile	6th	400 m	47.69
1985	South American Championships	Santiago, Chile	4th	4 × 400 m relay	3:11.32
1985	South American Junior Championships	Santa Fe, Argentina	3rd	800 m	1:51.94
1985	South American Junior Championships	Santa Fe, Argentina	3rd	4 × 100 m relay	41.68
1985	South American Junior Championships	Santa Fe, Argentina	1st	4 × 400 m relay	3:11.94
1986	South American Games	Santiago, Chile	1st	400 m	47.01
1986	South American Games	Santiago, Chile	1st	4 × 400 m relay	3:08.37
1987	Universiade	Zagreb, Yugoslavia	14th (sf)	400 m	47.45
1987	Universiade	Zagreb, Yugoslavia	6th	4 × 400 m relay	3:10.76
1987	South American Championships	São Paulo, Brazil	1st	4 × 400 m relay	3:07.64
1988	Ibero-American Championships	Mexico City, Mexico	6th	400 m	47.01
1988	Ibero-American Championships	Mexico City, Mexico	4th	4 × 400 m relay	3:08.50
1989	South American Championships	Medellín, Colombia	5th	100 m	46.68
1989	South American Championships	Medellín, Colombia	5th	4 × 100 m relay	41.66
1989	South American Championships	Medellín, Colombia	3rd	4 × 400 m relay	3:06.34
1990	Ibero-American Championships	Manaus, Brazil	7th (h)	200 m	22.04^{1}
1990	Ibero-American Championships	Manaus, Brazil	4th	400 m	47.63
1990	South American Games	Lima, Peru	1st	400 m	48.30
1990	South American Games	Lima, Peru	2nd	4 × 100 m relay	41.3
1990	South American Games	Lima, Peru	1st	4 × 400 m relay	3:16.70
1991	South American Championships	Manaus, Brazil	6th	200 m	21.38
1991	South American Championships	Manaus, Brazil	1st	400 m	46.55
1991	South American Championships	Manaus, Brazil	2nd	4 × 100 m relay	40.61
1991	Pan American Games	Havana, Cuba	15th (h)	200 m	21.67
1991	Pan American Games	Havana, Cuba	10th (h)	400 m	47.00
1991	World Championships	Tokyo, Japan	31st (h)	400 m	46.80^{2}
1992	Ibero-American Championships	Seville, Spain	13th (h)	200 m	22.04
1992	Ibero-American Championships	Seville, Spain	11th (h)	400 m	47.62
1992	Ibero-American Championships	Seville, Spain	6th	4 × 400 m relay	3:11.51
1993	South American Championships	Lima, Peru	4th	400 m	47.8
1993	South American Championships	Lima, Peru	3rd	4 × 400 m relay	3:09.5
1995	South American Championships	Manaus, Brazil	5th	400 m	47.69
1995	South American Championships	Manaus, Brazil	4th	4 × 100 m relay	41.38
1995	South American Championships	Manaus, Brazil	3rd	4 × 400 m relay	3:11.83

^{1} Did not start in the final

^{2} Did not start in the quarterfinals
