= Athletics at the 1987 Summer Universiade – Men's 4 × 400 metres relay =

The men's 4 × 400 metres relay event at the 1987 Summer Universiade was held at the Stadion Maksimir in Zagreb on 19 July 1987.

== Results ==
Rank	Nation	Athletes	Time	Notes
1st place, gold medalist(s)	United States	Raymond Pierre, Lorenzo Daniel, David Patrick, Kevin Robinzine	3:01.78	
2nd place, silver medalist(s)	Yugoslavia	Branislav Karaulić, Slobodan Popović, Slobodan Branković, Ismail Mačev	3:03.95	
3rd place, bronze medalist(s)	Soviet Union	Oleg Fatun, Valery Starodubtsev, Tagir Zemskov, Vladimir Prosin	3:05.85	
4	Italy	Andrea Montanari, Marcello Pantone, Alessandro Pinna, Tiziano Gembelli	3:06.21	
5	Canada	Andre Smith, Neville Douglas, Sylvain Lake, Paul Osland	3:08.32	
6	Chile	Pablo Squella, Alejandro Krauss, Álvaro Prenafeta, Carlos Morales	3:10.76	
