= Ray Quiñones =

Puerto Rican long jumper

Secretary of Sports and Recreation of Puerto Rico
- In office January 2, 2021 – December 31, 2024
- Governor: Pedro Pierluisi
- Preceded by: Adriana Sánchez Parés
- Succeeded by: Hector Vazquez Muñiz

Personal details
- Born: Reynaldo Jones Quiñones Vázquez; June 15, 1958 (age 68) Santa Isabel, Puerto Rico
- Party: New Progressive Party
- Education: University of Puerto Rico at Mayagüez (B.Ed.); University of Turabo (M.Ed.)

Reynaldo "Ray" Jones Quiñones Vázquez (born 15 June 1958 in Santa Isabel, Puerto Rico) is a retired Puerto Rican long jumper.

He won the Central American and Caribbean Championships in 1979 and 1987, the latter in a career best jump of 8.01 metres. He competed at the 1987 World Championships without reaching the final. He also competed in the men's long jump at the 1988 Summer Olympics.

He holds a bachelor's degree in pedagogy with a concentration in physical education from the University of Puerto Rico at Mayagüez and a master's degree in physical education from the University of Turabo.

He was athletic director at the University of Puerto Rico at Mayagüez.

In 2020, Ray Quiñones was nominated Secretary of Sports and Recreation of Puerto Rico by governor Pedro Pierluisi.

== International competitions ==
| Year | Competition | Venue | Position | Event | Notes |
Representing Puerto Rico
| 1974 | Central American and Caribbean; Junior Championships (U20) | Maracaibo, Venezuela | 2nd | Long jump | 6.85 m |
| 1976 | Central American and Caribbean; Junior Championships (U20) | Xalapa, Mexico | 2nd | Long jump | 7.40 m |
| 1976 | Central American and Caribbean; Junior Championships (U20) | Xalapa, Mexico | 2nd | Decathlon | 5996 pts |
| 1978 | Central American and Caribbean Games | Medellín, Colombia | 9th | Long jump | 6.85 m |
| 1979 | Central American and Caribbean Championships | Guadalajara, Mexico | 1st | Long jump | 7.70 m |
| 1979 | Pan American Games | San Juan, Puerto Rico | 5th | Long jump | 7.52 m |
| 1982 | Central American and Caribbean Games | Havana, Cuba | 8th | Long jump | 6.87 m |
| 1982 | Central American and Caribbean Games | Havana, Cuba | – | Decathlon | DNF |
| 1985 | Central American and Caribbean Championships | Nassau, Bahamas | 3rd | 4 × 100 m relay | 40.5 s |
| 1986 | Central American and Caribbean Games | Santiago, Dominican Republic | 5th | Long jump | 7.36 m |
| 1986 | Central American and Caribbean Games | Santiago, Dominican Republic | 4th | Decathlon | 6719 pts |
| 1987 | Central American and Caribbean Championships | Caracas, Venezuela | 1st | Long jump | 8.01 m |
| 1987 | Pan American Games | Indianapolis, United States | 8th | Long jump | 7.46 m (w) |
| 1987 | World Championships | Rome, Italy | 27th (q) | Long jump | 7.41 m |
| 1988 | Ibero-American Championships | Mexico City, Mexico | 5th | 4 × 100 m relay | 40.10 s |
| 1988 | Ibero-American Championships | Mexico City, Mexico | 7th | Long jump | 7.54 m |
| 1988 | Olympic Games | Seoul, South Korea | – | Long jump | NM |
