= 1984 South American Junior Championships in Athletics =

XVI South American Junior Championships in Athletics
- Dates: October 4–7
- Host city: Caracas, Venezuela
- Level: Under-20
- Events: 37
- Participation: about 176 athletes from 8 nations

The 16th South American Junior Championships in Athletics were held in Caracas, Venezuela from October 4–7, 1984.

== Participation ==
Detailed result lists can be found on the "World Junior Athletics History" website. An unofficial count yields the number of about 176 athletes from about 8 countries: Argentina (16), Brazil (34), Chile (18), Colombia (21), Panama (2), Peru (22), Uruguay (9), Venezuela (54).

== Medal summary ==
Medal winners are published for men and women Complete results can be found on the "World Junior Athletics History" website.

=== Men ===
Event	Gold		Silver		Bronze	
100 metres	Marcus Barros (BRA)	10.66	Reginaldo Sanches (BRA)	10.73	Inocencio García (VEN)	10.75
200 metres	Fernando Ramsey (PAN)	21.67	Sérgio Moreira (BRA)	22.06	Boris Miholovic (CHI)	22.19
400 metres	Carlos Morales (CHI)	48.0	Sérgio Moreira (BRA)	48.4	Joaquim Gasca (VEN)	48.6
800 metres	Luis Migueles (ARG)	1:48.9	Alexandre Vaz (BRA)	1:52.9	Héctor Saavedra (COL)	1:53.5
1500 metres	Luis Migueles (ARG)	3:53.01	João Lima (BRA)	3:55.10	Alexandre Vaz (BRA)	3:55.51
5000 metres	Antonio Silio (ARG)	14:57.62	Clodoaldo do Carmo (BRA)	14:59.44	Fernando Guio (COL)	15:18.42
110 metres hurdles	Lyndon Campos (BRA)	14.39	Juan Miguel Saldarriaga (COL)	15.29	Jefferson Klingel (BRA)	15.62
400 metres hurdles	Jefferson Klingel (BRA)	53.15	Wolfgang Crespo (VEN)	53.37	Jacinto Mariano (BRA)	53.39
2000 metres steeplechase	Eduardo Remião (BRA)	5:55.78	Sergio Yerenes (CHI)	5:59.46	Carlos Naput (ARG)	6:04.34
4 × 100 m relay	Venezuela (Venezuela); Pedro Matute; Inocencio García; Ivan Romero; Anibal Pacheco	41.19	Brazil (Brazil); Marcus Barros; Reginaldo Sanches; Sérgio Moreira; Sérgio Menezes	41.67	Peru (Peru); José Nishimura; Alejandro Marucic; César Cahua; Miguel Huamán	41.67
4 × 400 m relay	Brazil (Brazil); Reginaldo Sanches; Jacinto Mariano; Jefferson Klingel; Sérgio Moreira	3:14.67	Venezuela (Venezuela); Luis Arévalo; Charles Bodington; Guevara; Joaquim Gasca	3:16.59	Peru (Peru); Alberto Izu; Daniel Delgado; Sergio Bollinger; Ramiro Quintana	3:19.61
10,000 metres walk	Omar Guerrero (VEN)	46:32.84	Jorge Torrealba (VEN)	46:36.52	Mauricio González (COL)	46:37.36
High jump	Luciano Bacelli (BRA)	2.12 m	Fernando Pastoriza (ARG)	2.09 m	Hugo Peyrel (ARG)	1.95 m
Pole vault	Fernando Pastoriza (ARG)	4.30 m	Juan Miguel Saldarriaga (COL)	4.30 m	Pedro da Silva Filho (BRA)	4.30 m
Long jump	Sergio Roh (ARG)	7.41 m	Marcus Barros (BRA)	7.33 m	Luis Dorrego (URU)	7.02 m
Triple jump	Osvaldo Zabala (VEN)	15.55 m	Jorge da Silva (BRA)	15.29 m	Rogerio Emigdio (BRA)	15.12 m
Shot put	José de Souza (BRA)	19.64 m	Horacio Alaluf (ARG)	17.61 m	Claudio Rodríguez (ARG)	16.78 m
Discus throw	José de Souza (BRA)	49.24 m	Claudio Rodríguez (ARG)	45.10 m	Douglas Robles (VEN)	39.10 m
Hammer throw	David Castrillón (COL)	65.08 m	Mario Leme (BRA)	60.08 m	Gustavo Heger (ARG)	59.28 m
Javelin throw	Álvaro Castillo (CHI)	66.36 m	João Orlando van Dal (BRA)	60.14 m	Gregorio Barrios (VEN)	59.78 m
Decathlon	Pedro da Silva Filho (BRA)	7338 pts	Álvaro Mena (COL)	7004 pts	José Nunes (BRA)	6884 pts

=== Women ===
Event	Gold		Silver		Bronze	
100 metres	Patricia Pérez (CHI)	11.85	Aline Figueirêdo (BRA)	11.94	Nara das Neves (BRA)	12.10
200 metres	Aline Figueirêdo (BRA)	24.33	Patricia Pérez (CHI)	24.75	Nara das Neves (BRA)	24.75
400 metres	Irina Ambulo (PAN)	54.83	Carmen Mosegui (URU)	55.81	Soledad Acerenza (URU)	56.07
800 metres	Ana Nascimento (BRA)	2:01.41	Sandra Herrera (CHI)	2:12.01	Marcela Lobos (CHI)	2:12.17
1500 metres	Liliana Góngora (ARG)	4:26.19	Jorilda Sabino (BRA)	4:32.33	Ruth Jaime (PER)	4:32.37
3000 metres	Jorilda Sabino (BRA)	9:34.57	Ruth Jaime (PER)	9:34.92	Esperanza Sierra (COL)	10:16.80
100 metres hurdles	Márcia Torres (BRA)	14.46	Carmen Bezanilla (CHI)	14.47	Alejandra Martínez (CHI)	14.50
200 metres hurdles	Carmen Bezanilla (CHI)	28.43w	Márcia García (BRA)	28.92w	Márcia Torres (BRA)	29.25w
4 × 100 m relay	Brazil (Brazil); Márcia García; Nara das Neves; Maria Simões; Aline Figueirêdo	46.86	Chile (Chile); Maria Oliva; Alejandra Martínez; Patricia Pérez; Carmen Bezanilla	47.24	Uruguay (Uruguay); Carmen Mosegui; Soledad Acerenza; Claudia Acerenza; Margarita Martirena	47.55
4 × 400 m relay	Brazil (Brazil); Aline Figueirêdo; Márcia García; Nara das Neves; Maria Simões	3:44.70	Uruguay (Uruguay); Carmen Mosegui; Margarita Martirena; Soledad Acerenza; Claudia Acerenza	3:51.08	Venezuela (Venezuela); Wilma Jordan; Milexa Figueroa; Doralis Chacin; Migdalia Blanco	3:58.17
High jump	Orlane dos Santos (BRA)	1.82 m	Julia de Souza (BRA)	1.76 m	Andrea Sassi (URU)	1.67 m
Long jump	Maria Oliva (CHI)	6.12 m	Orlane dos Santos (BRA)	5.87 m	Silvia Murialdo (ARG)	5.80 m
Shot put	María Isabel Urrutia (COL)	13.66 m	Eliane de Campos (BRA)	12.88 m	Amelia Moreira (BRA)	11.68 m
Discus throw	Ruth Centeno (VEN)	43.92 m	Jenny Quintero (VEN)	43.34 m	María Isabel Urrutia (COL)	41.60 m
Javelin throw	Mônica Rocha (BRA)	49.50 m	Paulina Jaramillo (CHI)	45.62 m	Deisy Córdova (VEN)	38.96 m
Heptathlon	Orlane dos Santos (BRA)	5440 pts	Nadia Katich (COL)	5336 pts	Claudia Brien (CHI)	4871 pts

== Medal table ==
* Host nation (Venezuela)

Rank	Nation	Gold	Silver	Bronze	Total
1	Brazil (BRA)	18	17	10	45
2	Argentina (ARG)	6	3	5	14
3	Chile (CHI)	5	6	4	15
4	Venezuela (VEN)*	4	4	6	14
5	Colombia (COL)	2	4	5	11
6	Panama (PAN)	2	0	0	2
7	Uruguay (URU)	0	2	4	6
8	Peru (PER)	0	1	3	4
Totals (8 entries)		37	37	37	111
