= Manuel Balmaceda (athlete) =

Chilean runner

Personal information
- Full name: Manuel José Daniel Balmaceda Olavarrieta
- Born: 5 May 1967 (age 59)

Sport
- Sport: Athletics
- Events: 800 metres, 1500 metres
Medal record
Representing Chile
South American Games
Gold medal – first place	1986 Santiago	800m
Bronze medal – third place	1994 Valencia	800m
World Junior Championships
Silver medal – second place	1986 Athens	800m

Manuel José Daniel Balmaceda Olavarrieta (born 5 May 1967) is a retired Chilean middle-distance runner. He won a silver medal at the 1986 World Junior Championships. In addition, he represented his country in the 1500 metres at the 1987 World Championships without advancing from the first round.

== International competitions ==
Year	Competition	Venue	Position	Event	Notes
Representing Chile
1985	Universiade	Kobe, Japan	24th (h)	800 m	1:51.03
1985	Universiade	Kobe, Japan	21st (h)	1500 m	3:51.97
1985	South American Championships	Santiago, Chile	7th	800 m	1:51.88
1985	South American Junior Championships	Santa Fe, Argentina	1st	800 m	1:49.77
1985	South American Junior Championships	Santa Fe, Argentina	1st	1500 m	3:52.4
1985	South American Junior Championships	Santa Fe, Argentina	1st	4 × 400 m relay	3:11.94
1986	Pan American Junior Championships	Winter Park, United States	1st	1500 m	1:50.41
1986	World Junior Championships	Athens, Greece	2nd	800 m	1:48.91
1986	South American Junior Championships	Quito, Ecuador	2nd	1500 m	4:07.7
1986	Ibero-American Championships	Havana, Cuba	5th	800 m	1:51.82
1986	South American Games	Santiago, Chile	1st	800 m	1:47.98
1987	Universiade	Zagreb, Yugoslavia	4th	800 m	1:47.37
1987	Universiade	Zagreb, Yugoslavia	12th	1500 m	3:52.73
1987	Pan American Games	Indianapolis, United States	8th	800 m	1:51.77
1987	World Championships	Rome, Italy	36th (h)	1500 m	3:49.52
1987	South American Championships	São Paulo, Brazil	3rd	1500 m	3:47.43
1987	South American Championships	São Paulo, Brazil	1st	4 × 400 m relay	3:07.64
1988	Ibero-American Championships	Mexico City, Mexico	3rd	800 m	1:47.66
1988	Ibero-American Championships	Mexico City, Mexico	4th	4 × 400 m relay	3:08.50
1991	South American Championships	Manaus, Brazil	9th (h)	800 m	1:52.05
1991	South American Championships	Manaus, Brazil	5th	4 × 400 m relay	3:14.41
1992	Ibero-American Championships	Seville, Spain	14th (h)	800 m	1:52.85
1994	South American Games	Valencia, Venezuela	3rd	800 m	1:51.57
1995	Universiade	Fukuoka, Japan	30th (h)	800 m	1:54.07
1997	South American Championships	Mar del Plata, Argentina	3rd	800 m	1:51.38

^{1}Did not finish in the semifinals

== Personal bests ==
Outdoor

- 800 metres – 1:46.29 (Manresa 1987)
- 1500 metres – 3:44.60 (Zagreb 1987)
