= Athletics at the 1987 Pan American Games – Men's decathlon =

Men's decathlon at the Pan American Games

The men's decathlon event at the 1987 Pan American Games was held in Indianapolis, United States on 12 and 13 August.

== Results ==
The highest mark recorded in each event is highlighted in yellow

Rank	Athlete	Nationality	100m	LJ	SP	HJ	400m	110m H	DT	PV	JT	1500m	Points	Notes
1st place, gold medalist(s)	Mike Gonzales	United States	11.63	7.03	13.30	1.93	51.35	14.88	46.53	4.90	64.79	4:59.94	7649	
2nd place, silver medalist(s)	Keith Robinson	United States	11.23	7.03	13.10	1.98	49.52	14.73	46.30	4.20	61.13	5:07.17	7573	
3rd place, bronze medalist(s)	Gordon Orlikow	Canada	11.30	7.13	13.03	1.93	49.16	14.68	38.15	4.30	51.71	4:38.08	7441	
4	Santiago Mellado	El Salvador	11.52	6.53	11.83	1.98	50.31	15.47	34.82	4.00	46.88	4:47.70	6799	
5	Paul Hewlett	British Virgin Islands	11.50	6.31	11.70	1.88	50.76	16.03	35.43	4.20	47.14	4:50.41	6609	NR
6	George Biehl	Chile	11.52	6.73	11.34	1.76	53.87	14.96	32.51	3.80	43.38	4:47.67	6361	
	Fidel Solórzano	Ecuador	11.10	7.41	12.09	2.03	49.98	15.53	35.53	DNS	–	–	DNF	
	Pedro da Silva	Brazil	10.87	NM	DNS	–	–	–	–	–	–	–	DNF	
