= Athletics at the 1987 Pan American Games – Men's 800 metres =

Men's 800 metres at the Pan American Games

The men's 800 metres event at the 1987 Pan American Games was held in Indianapolis, United States on 13, 15 and 16 August.

== Medalists ==
Gold	Silver	Bronze
Johnny Gray; United States	José Luíz Barbosa; Brazil	Stanley Redwine; United States

== Results ==
=== Heats ===
Rank	Heat	Name	Nationality	Time	Notes
1	2	Johnny Gray	United States	1:48.44	Q
2	2	Mauricio Hernández	Mexico	1:48.69	Q
3	1	José Luíz Barbosa	Brazil	1:48.97	Q
4	2	Pablo Squella	Chile	1:49.13	Q
5	1	Manuel Balmaceda	Chile	1:49.14	Q
6	1	Luis Karin Toledo	Mexico	1:49.26	Q
7	1	Dale Jones	Antigua and Barbuda	1:49.42	Q
8	2	Luis Migueles	Argentina	1:49.45	Q
9	1	Reuben Bayley	Barbados	1:49.62	q
10	2	Devoe Whaley	Bermuda	1:49.85	q
11	3	Paul Osland	Canada	1:50.15	Q
12	2	Francisco Figueredo	Paraguay	1:50.17	q, NR
13	3	Stanley Redwine	United States	1:51.45	Q
14	3	William Wuycke	Venezuela	1:51.53	Q
15	2	Charles Bodington	Venezuela	1:51.64	q
16	3	Igor Costa	Brazil	1:51.84	Q
17	3	Larry Miller	Antigua and Barbuda	1:53.10	
	1	Simon Hoogewerf	Canada	DNF	q
	3	Ferdinand Clarke	Guyana	DNS	

=== Semifinals ===
Rank	Heat	Name	Nationality	Time	Notes
1	2	José Luíz Barbosa	Brazil	1:48.02	Q
2	2	Pablo Squella	Chile	1:48.21	Q
3	2	Stanley Redwine	United States	1:48.26	Q
4	2	Paul Osland	Canada	1:48.29	Q
5	2	Luis Karin Toledo	Mexico	1:48.36	
6	1	Johnny Gray	United States	1:48.49	Q
7	1	William Wuycke	Venezuela	1:48.64	Q
8	1	Mauricio Hernández	Mexico	1:48.73	Q
9	1	Manuel Balmaceda	Chile	1:48.87	Q
10	1	Devoe Whaley	Bermuda	1:49.51	
11	1	Reuben Bayley	Barbados	1:49.70	
12	2	Luis Migueles	Argentina	1:51.02	
13	1	Reuben Bayley	Barbados	1:52.69	
14	2	Francisco Figueredo	Paraguay	1:53.44	
15	1	Simon Hoogewerf	Canada	1:54.08	
16	1	Igor Costa	Brazil	1:56.68	
	2	Charles Bodington	Venezuela	DNS	

=== Final ===
Rank	Name	Nationality	Time	Notes
1st place, gold medalist(s)	Johnny Gray	United States	1:46.79	
2nd place, silver medalist(s)	José Luíz Barbosa	Brazil	1:47.37	
3rd place, bronze medalist(s)	Stanley Redwine	United States	1:47.73	
4	William Wuycke	Venezuela	1:48.34	
5	Pablo Squella	Chile	1:48.39	
6	Mauricio Hernández	Mexico	1:48.96	
7	Paul Osland	Canada	1:48.99	
8	Manuel Balmaceda	Chile	1:51.77	
