= Athletics at the 1987 Summer Universiade – Women's 100 metres =

The women's 100 metres event at the 1987 Summer Universiade was held at the Stadion Maksimir in Zagreb on 13 and 14 July 1987.

== Medalists ==
Gold	Silver	Bronze
Gwen Torrence; United States	Irina Slyusar; Soviet Union	Tina Iheagwam; Nigeria

== Results ==
=== Heats ===
Held on 13 July

Wind:
Heat 6: -0.2 m/s

Rank	Heat	Athlete	Nationality	Time	Notes
1	6	Natalya Pomoshchnikova	Soviet Union	11.30	Q
1	5	Mary Berkeley	Great Britain	11.50	Q
2	5	Liliana Allen	Cuba	11.54	Q
3	2	Gwen Torrence	United States	11.55	Q
4	5	Eusebia Riquelme	Cuba	11.56	Q
5	4	Ethlyn Tate	Jamaica	11.58	Q
5	5	Irina Slyusar	Soviet Union	11.58	q
7	4	Tina Iheagwam	Nigeria	11.61	Q
8	6	Falilat Ogunkoya	Nigeria	11.67	Q
9	1	Wendy Vereen	United States	11.71	Q
10	6	Vivienne Spence	Jamaica	11.76	Q
11	3	Kornelija Šinković	Yugoslavia	11.86	Q
12	5	Patricia Pérez	Chile	11.93	q
13	3	Park Mi-sun	South Korea	11.99	Q
14	1	Rossella Tarolo	Italy	12.01	Q
15	2	Annarita Balzani	Italy	12.03	Q
16	3	Sue Alton	Australia	12.06	Q
17	4	Duška Suzić	Yugoslavia	12.18	Q
18	4	Latifa Lahcen	Morocco	12.18	q
19	1	Gisèle Ongollo	Gabon	12.26	Q
20	6	Yvette Bonapart	Suriname	12.29	q
21	5	Sandra Govinden	Mauritius	12.43	q
22	5	Félicite Bada	Benin	12.45	q
23	5	Méryem Oumezdi	Morocco	12.46	q
24	6	Aminata Konaté	Guinea	12.71	
25	6	Carmen Cartagena	Peru	12.74	
26	2	Noshaba Khan	Pakistan	12.77	Q
27	2	Cecilia Núñez	Panama	12.96	
28	3	Peninnah Aligawesa	Uganda	13.15	
29	2	Lindani Stephenson	Guyana	13.27	
30	3	Chung Lai Lai	Hong Kong	13.36	
31	1	Adama Perkissam	Chad	13.45	
32	4	Teresa Maria Costa	São Tomé and Príncipe	13.53	
33	6	Adela Maha	Sudan	16.82	
34	3	Abdelgader Hanadi	Sudan	16.88	

=== Semifinals ===
Held on 14 July

Rank	Heat	Athlete	Nationality	Time	Notes
1	3	Gwen Torrence	United States	11.33	Q
2	2	Wendy Vereen	United States	11.39	Q
3	2	Irina Slyusar	Soviet Union	11.41	Q
4	1	Natalya Pomoshchnikova	Soviet Union	11.48	Q
5	3	Eusebia Riquelme	Cuba	11.51	Q
6	2	Mary Berkeley	Great Britain	11.54	q
7	3	Falilat Ogunkoya	Nigeria	11.56	q
8	3	Vivienne Spence	Jamaica	11.61	
9	1	Tina Iheagwam	Nigeria	11.63	Q
10	2	Ethlyn Tate	Jamaica	11.66	
11	2	Rossella Tarolo	Italy	11.80	
12	1	Kornelija Šinković	Yugoslavia	11.84	
13	3	Annarita Balzani	Italy	11.98	
14	1	Patricia Pérez	Chile	12.01	
15	1	Park Mi-sun	South Korea	12.03	
16	3	Sue Alton	Australia	12.09	
17	3	Duška Suzić	Yugoslavia	12.17	
18	1	Gisèle Ongollo	Gabon	12.31	
18	2	Latifa Lahcen	Morocco	12.31	
20	1	Yvette Bonapart	Suriname	12.32	
21	2	Félicite Bada	Benin	12.42	
22	2	Sandra Govinden	Mauritius	12.59	
23	3	Méryem Oumezdi	Morocco	12.67	
24	1	Noshaba Khan	Pakistan	13.02	

=== Final ===
Held on 14 July

Wind: +0.5 m/s

Rank	Lane	Athlete	Nationality	Time	Notes
1st place, gold medalist(s)	6	Gwen Torrence	United States	11.09	
2nd place, silver medalist(s)	4	Irina Slyusar	Soviet Union	11.34	
3rd place, bronze medalist(s)	7	Tina Iheagwam	Nigeria	11.40	
4	3	Natalya Pomoshchnikova	Soviet Union	11.41	
5	4	Wendy Vereen	United States	11.41	
6	2	Eusebia Riquelme	Cuba	11.41	
7	8	Mary Berkeley	Great Britain	11.53	
8	1	Falilat Ogunkoya	Nigeria	11.58	
