= Ernesto Diaz =

Ernesto Diaz may refer to:

- Ernesto Díaz, Colombian footballer
- Ernesto Díaz Espinoza, Chilean writer, film director and editor
- Ernesto Díaz González, Puerto Rican television sportscaster
- A fictional character in the video game Time Crisis II
