= Maria do Carmo Fialho =

Personal information
- Full name: Maria do Carmo Fialho Bortoloci
- Nationality: Brazilian
- Born: 17 July 1960 (age 65)

Sport
- Sport: Athletics
- Event: 400 metres hurdles

Maria do Carmo Fialho Bortoloci (born 17 July 1960) is a retired Brazilian athlete who specialised in the 400 metres hurdles. She represented his country at the 1987 World Championships without advancing from the first round.

Her personal best in the event is 57.20 seconds set in São Paulo in 1987.

== International competitions ==
Year	Competition	Venue	Position	Event	Notes
Representing Brazil
1983	South American Championships	Santa Fe, Argentina	6th	800 m	2:09.0
1983	South American Championships	Santa Fe, Argentina	1st	4 × 400 m relay	3:40.0
1985	South American Championships	Santiago, Chile	4th	400 m	54.47
1985	South American Championships	Santiago, Chile	1st	400 m hurdles	59.45
1985	South American Championships	Santiago, Chile	1st	4 × 400 m relay	3:39.77
1986	Ibero-American Championships	Havana, Cuba	4th	400 m hurdles	62.26
1987	World Championships	Rome, Italy	31st (h)	400 m hurdles	58.93
1987	World Championships	Rome, Italy	11th (h)	4 × 400 m relay	3:30.91
1987	South American Championships	Manaus, Brazil	2nd	400 m hurdles	59.92
1987	South American Championships	Manaus, Brazil	1st	4 × 400 m relay	3:38.13
1988	Ibero-American Championships	Mexico City, Mexico	8th	400 m hurdles	67.64
1989	South American Championships	Medellín, Colombia	4th	400 m hurdles	160.97
1989	South American Championships	Medellín, Colombia	2nd	4 × 400 m relay	3:37.7
