= Gustavo Capart =

Personal information
- Full name: Gustavo Raúl Capart
- Born: 29 July 1964 (age 62)

Sport
- Sport: Athletics
- Events: 100 metres, 200 metres

Gustavo Raúl Capart (born 29 July 1964) is a retired Argentinian sprinter. He represented his country in the 200 metres at the 1983 World Championships in Helsinki without reaching the second round.

== International competitions ==
Year	Competition	Venue	Position	Event	Notes
Representing Argentina
1980	South American Junior Championships	Santiago, Chile	4th	200 m	22.02
1980	South American Junior Championships	Santiago, Chile	1st	4 × 100 m relay	41.17
1982	Pan American Junior Championships	Barquisimeto, Venezuela	6th	100 m	10.77 (w)
1982	Pan American Junior Championships	Barquisimeto, Venezuela	5th	200 m	21.07
1982	Southern Cross Games	Santa Fe, Argentina	4th	100 m	11.06
1982	Southern Cross Games	Santa Fe, Argentina	2nd	200 m	21.58
1983	World Championships	Helsinki, Finland	32nd (h)	200 m	21.66
1983	South American Championships	Santa Fe, Argentina	6th	200 m	21.9
1985	South American Championships	Santiago, Chile	7th	200 m	22.17
1985	South American Championships	Santiago, Chile	7th	400 m	48.21
1985	South American Championships	Santiago, Chile	4th	4 × 100 m relay	41.17
1985	South American Championships	Santiago, Chile	2nd	4 × 400 m relay	3:10.21

== Personal bests ==
Outdoor

- 100 metres – 10.69 (+1.7 m/s, Barquisimeto 1982)
- 200 metres – 21.07 (-1.4 m/s, Barquisimeto 1982)
- 400 metres – 48.21 (Santiago 1985)
- 400 metres – 47.9h (Buenos Aires 1984)
