= Luis Migueles =

Argentine middle-distance runner

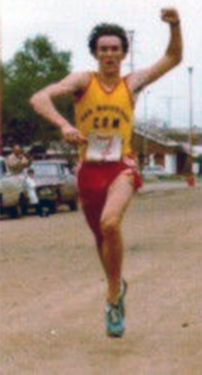
- Luis Migueles in 1982

Personal information
- Born: 1 April 1965 (age 61) San Salvador, Entre Ríos, Argentina
- Height: 1.80 m (5 ft 11 in)
- Weight: 71 kg (157 lb)

Sport
- Sport: Athletics
- Event: 800 m

Luis Antonio Migueles (born 1 April 1965 in San Salvador) is a retired Argentine middle-distance runner who competed primarily in the 800 meters. He represented his country at five indoor and two outdoor World Championships. In addition he won multiple medals on regional level.

Migueles is still the Argentine record holder in several events.

== Competition record ==
Year	Competition	Venue	Position	Event	Notes
Representing Argentina
1982	Southern Cross Games	Rosario, Argentina	4th	800 m	1:52.89
1983	South American Junior Championships	Medellín, Colombia	1st	800 m	1:51.10
1983	South American Junior Championships	Medellín, Colombia	1st	1500 m	3:54.3
1983	South American Junior Championships	Medellín, Colombia	3rd	4 × 400 m relay	3:19.98
1983	South American Championships	Santa Fe, Argentina	4th	800 m	1:50.7
1984	Pan American Junior Championships	Nassau, Bahamas	2nd	800 m	1:48.67
1984	Pan American Junior Championships	Nassau, Bahamas	2nd	1500 m	3:50.93
1984	South American Junior Championships	Caracas, Venezuela	1st	800 m	1:48.9
1984	South American Junior Championships	Caracas, Venezuela	1st	1500 m	3:53.01
1984	South American Junior Championships	Caracas, Venezuela	1st	4 × 400 m relay	3:27.31
1985	World Indoor Games	Paris, France	10th (h)	800 m	1:53.89
1985	South American Championships	São Paulo, Brazil	1st	800 m	1:46.90
1985	South American Championships	São Paulo, Brazil	2nd	4 × 400 m relay	3:10.21
1986	Ibero-American Championships	Havana, Cuba	3rd	800 m	1:49.19
1986	South American Games	Santiago, Chile	2nd	800 m	1:48.00
1987	World Indoor Championships	Indianapolis, United States	14th (h)	800 m	1:51.03
1987	Pan American Games	Indianapolis, United States	8th (h)	800 m	1:49.45
1987	World Championships	Rome, Italy	34th (h)	800 m	1:49.52
1987	World Championships	Rome, Italy	22nd (h)	4 × 400 m relay	3:12.96
1987	South American Championships	São Paulo, Brazil	1st	800 m	1:47.35
1987	South American Championships	São Paulo, Brazil	3rd	4 × 400 m relay	3:10.36
1988	Ibero-American Championships	Mexico City, Mexico	6th	800 m	1:52.34
1989	World Indoor Championships	Budapest, Hungary	20th (h)	800 m	1:51.58
1990	Ibero-American Championships	Manaus, Brazil	2nd	800 m	1:46.97
1991	World Indoor Championships	Seville, Spain	8th (h)	800 m	1:49.00
1991	Pan American Games	Havana, Cuba	8th	800 m	1:48.86
1991	World Championships	Tokyo, Japan	35th (h)	800 m	1:51.42
1992	Ibero-American Championships	Seville, Spain	5th	800 m	1:48.61
1992	Ibero-American Championships	Seville, Spain	9th	4 × 400 m relay	3:15.00
1993	World Indoor Championships	Toronto, Canada	20th (h)	800 m	1:51.03
1993	South American Championships	Lima, Peru	2nd	800 m	1:52.12
1993	South American Championships	Lima, Peru	4th	1500 m	3:54.9

== Personal bests ==
Outdoor

- 800 metres – 1:46.01 (Bratislava 1986) NR
- 1000 metres – 2:21.9 (Prague 1986) NR
- 1500 metres – 3:48.93 (São Paulo 1993)

Indoor

- 800 metres – 1:49.00 (Seville 1991) NR
- 1000 metres – 2:23.31 (Madrid 1991) NR
