= Athletics at the 1995 Pan American Games – Men's decathlon =

Men's decathlon at the Pan American Games

The men's decathlon event at the 1995 Pan American Games was held at the Estadio Atletico "Justo Roman" on 17 and 18 March.

== Results ==
The highest mark recorded in each event is highlighted in yellow

Rank	Athlete	Nationality	100m	LJ	SP	HJ	400m	110m H	DT	PV	JT	1500m	Points	Notes
1st place, gold medalist(s)	Kip Janvrin	United States	11.08	7.07	14.41	1.88	48.09	14.69	46.28	4.80	57.56	4:22.84	8049	GR
2nd place, silver medalist(s)	Eugenio Balanqué	Cuba	10.71	6.96	14.44	2.03	48.06	14.33	44.28	4.20	58.70	4:44.62	7948	
3rd place, bronze medalist(s)	Alejandro Cárdenas	Mexico	10.61	7.33	12.01	1.88	47.05	16.10	32.97	4.20	57.23	4:41.29	7387	
4	Jorge Camacho	Mexico	11.11	6.92	12.74	1.88	50.17	15.12	39.67	4.40	44.32	4:37.50	7210	
5	Pedro da Silva Filho	Brazil	11.09	7.17	14.29	1.91	51.66	14.85	43.06	NM	60.82	5:21.29	6692	
6	Diego Kerwitz	Argentina	11.64w	6.95w	10.78	2.00	52.33	16.23	31.46	4.00	52.16	4:52.89	6610	
7	Juan Carlos Silva	Uruguay	11.39	6.79	10.98	1.94	52.00	15.75	30.78	4.00	49.62	4:56.60	6579	
	José Román	Puerto Rico	12.71	DNS	–	–	–	–	–	–	–	–	DNF	
	Steve Fritz	United States	DNS	–	–	–	–	–	–	–	–	–	DNS	
