= Wilson dos Santos (athlete) =

Brazilian sprinter

Personal information
- Full name: Wilson David dos Santos
- Born: 9 December 1958 (age 67) São Paulo, Brazil
- Height: 1.88 m (6 ft 2 in)
- Weight: 74 kg (163 lb)

Sport
- Sport: Sprinting
- Event: 400 metres
- Club: AD Guarulhos

Wilson David dos Santos (born 9 December 1958) is a Brazilian sprinter. He competed in the men's 400 metres at the 1984 Summer Olympics.

His personal best in the event is 46.18 seconds set in 1985.

== International competitions ==
Year	Competition	Venue	Position	Event	Notes
Representing Brazil
1977	South American Championships	Montevideo, Uruguay	6th	800 m	2:00.5
1979	South American Championships	Bucaramanga, Colombia	9th (h)	800 m	1:50.4
1979	South American Championships	Bucaramanga, Colombia	3rd	4 × 400 m relay	3:10.5
1981	South American Championships	La Paz, Bolivia	3rd	800 m	1:55.9
1984	Olympic Games	Los Angeles, United States	51st (h)	400 m	47.55
1984	Olympic Games	Los Angeles, United States	8th (sf)	4 × 400 m relay	3:03:99
1985	Universiade	Kobe, Japan	16th (sf)	400 m	46.92
1985	South American Championships	Santiago, Chile	4th	400 m	47.16
1985	South American Championships	Santiago, Chile	1st	4 × 400 m relay	3:07.96
