= Gordon Orlikow =

Canadian decathlete (born 1960)

Personal information
- Born: 5 May 1960 (age 66)
- Home town: Winnipeg, Canada: University of Manitoba (BA; master's degree); Queens University (master's degree)
- Occupation: management consultant
- Employer: Korn/Ferry International
- Relatives: David Orlikow, member of the House of Commons of Canada representing Winnipeg North; uncle
- Other interests: Chairman of the board of Athletics Canada
Medal record
Men's athletics
Representing Canada
Pan American Games
Bronze medal – third place	1987 Indianapolis	decathlon
Maccabiah Games
Gold medal – first place	Israel 1985	110 m hurdles
Gold medal – first place	Israel 1985	decathlon
Silver medal – second place	Israel 1981	110 m hurdles
Bronze medal – third place	Israel 1981	decathlon

Gordon Orlikow (born May 5, 1960) is a Canadian former decathlon, heptathlon, and hurdles competitor who won medals in the 73rd Drake Relays, the 1981 Maccabiah Games and 1985 Maccabiah Games in Israel, and the 1987 Pan American Games. He is a former chairman of the board of directors of Athletics Canada, and a member of the Canadian Olympic Committee. He is also a senior client partner at Korn/Ferry International.

== Biography ==
=== Early life ===
Orlikow attended Kelvin High School, graduating in 1978, and is a member of the school's Hall of Fame. He lives in Winnipeg, Canada. His uncle was David Orlikow, member of the House of Commons of Canada representing Winnipeg North.

He earned a BA in economics and a master's degree in public administration from the University of Manitoba, and a master's degree in economics from Queens University. Orlikow competed for the Manitoba Bisons in track and field, and is honored on the Bisons Walkway of Honour.

Gordon Orlikow has four children - Daniel Orlikow (1987), Gillian Turnbull (1991), Nicholas Belluk (1999) and Liliana Orlikow (2001).

=== Decathlon, heptathlon, and hurdles competitor ===
At the 1981 Maccabiah Games in Israel, Orlikow won a bronze medal in the decathlon and a silver medal in the 110 m hurdles.

In 1982, Orlikow came from behind in two events to win the two-day 73rd Drake Relays 10-event decathlon at Drake Stadium in Des Moines, Iowa. Orlikow finished fourth in the javelin and second in the 1,500 meters, amassing 6,974 points. At the 1984 Maccabi Pan American Games in São Paulo, Brazil, Orlikow won four gold medals (high jump, pole vault, discus, and hurdles) and two silver medals (long jump and 400 m) in track & field.

At the 1985 Maccabiah Games in Israel, Orlikow won the gold medal in the men's decathlon with 7,141 points. He finished in first place in the 110 m hurdles and 1,500 m run, and in second place in the 400 m run, the long jump, discus, javelin, and shot put. He also broke the Maccabiah Games record in the 100-meter hurdles at 14.73 seconds, earning a second gold medal.

Orlikow came in sixth in the decathlon for Canada at the 1986 Commonwealth Games in Edinburgh, Scotland. He came in second in the 400 m, third in the 100 m, 4th in the long jump and high jump, and 10th in the shot put.

He competed in track and field for Canada at the Maccabi Pan Am Games in São Paulo, Brazil. Orlikow won four gold medals and two silver medals.

Orlikow was a bronze medalist in the men's decathlon at the 1987 Pan American Games in Indianapolis, Indiana, in the United States for Canada, with 7,441 points. In 1987 he also came in second to Olympian Dave Steen in the Canadian national heptathlon title competition.

=== Chairman of Athletics Canada ===
In 2009 Orlikow was named chairman of the board of Athletics Canada, the national governing body of athletics in Canada. He held the position until 2017, and led the Canadian delegation at the 2017 IAAF World Championships & Congress. He is also a member of the Canadian Olympic Committee, which represents Canada at the International Olympic Committee (IOC). Orlikow has been appointed chair by the Bonn, Germany-based International Paralympic Committee (IPC) Governing Board of its Nominations Panel.

=== Business ===
In 1985 Orlikow worked at the Manitoba Ministry of Finance. He began his full-time career at food corporation Cargill, in 1988-91. He was Director of Human Resources of Canadian railway BC Rail Ltd. until 1999, in 2000 he became Senior Vice President, People of The Loewen Group Inc., and worked there until 2003. Orlikow became president of the Strategic Leadership Forum, which seeks to strengthen Canada's global competitiveness in leadership development. He is a Senior Client Partner in the Industrial sector of management consulting firm Korn/Ferry International.

== See also ==
- List of Pan American Games medalists in athletics (men)
