= Puerto Rico Department of Sports and Recreation =

Government of Puerto Rico

- Departamento de Recreación y Deportes de Puerto Rico
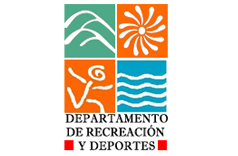

Department overview
- Formed: June 13, 1980; 46 years ago
- Jurisdiction: executive branch
- Headquarters: San Juan, PR
- Department executive: Hector Vazquez Muñiz, Secretary
- Key document: Law No. 126 of 1980
- Website: www.drd.pr.gov

The Puerto Rico Department of Sports and Recreation (Spanish: Departamento de Recreación y Deportes de Puerto Rico) is the executive department of the government of Puerto Rico responsible of sports and recreation in the U.S. Commonwealth of Puerto Rico.

The department's headquarters complex is located in Santurce on the banks of the Martín Peña Channel in Santurce, Puerto Rico.

In January 2025, sports journalist Hector Vazquez Muñiz was designated by Governor Jenniffer González as Secretary of the department.

== History ==
In October 2008 governor Aníbal Acevedo Vilá inaugurated the new headquarters of the agency on the site of a former slum known as "El Fanguito" in San Juan at a cost of $24 million.

In June 2017 the FBI informed it had indicted seven individuals linked to a $9.8 million for money laundering and fraud while working for the agency from 2013 to 2016. Former secretary of the agency Ramón Orta was among those arrested. In January 2021 Orta was sentenced to six months in prison after pleading guilty.
