= Athletics at the 1987 Pan American Games – Men's long jump =

Men's long jump at the Pan American Games

The men's long jump event at the 1987 Pan American Games was held in Indianapolis, United States on 14 and 16 August.

== Medalists ==
Gold	Silver	Bronze
Carl Lewis; United States	Larry Myricks; United States	Jaime Jefferson; Cuba

== Results ==
=== Qualification ===
Qualifying distance: 7.75 metres

Rank	Name	Nationality	#1	#2	#3	Time	Notes
1	Larry Myricks	United States		8.07		8.07	Q
2	Carl Lewis	United States	x	8.06		8.06	Q
3	Jaime Jefferson	Cuba				7.90	Q
4	Lester Benjamin	Antigua and Barbuda				7.73	q
5	Olivier Cadier	Brazil				7.65	q
6	Carlos Casar	Mexico				7.57w	q
7	Ian James	Canada				7.46w	q
8	Ray Quiñones	Puerto Rico				7.40	q
9	Norbett Elliot	Bahamas				7.28	q
10	Mark Mason	Guyana				7.11w	q
11	Fernando Valiente	Peru				7.01	q
12	Ricardo Valiente	Peru				6.94	q
13	Devon Hyde	Belize	6.46	6.75	x	6.75	
14	Mauricio Carranza	El Salvador	6.37	6.11	x	6.37	
15	Bruny Surin	Canada	x	5.40	x	5.40	
	Elmer Williams	Puerto Rico	x	–	–	NM	
	Fidel Solorzano	Ecuador				DNS	

=== Final ===
Rank	Name	Nationality	#1	#2	#3	#4	#5	#6	Result	Notes
1st place, gold medalist(s)	Carl Lewis	United States	6.89	8.75w	8.53	8.75	8.68w	8.68	8.75	GR
2nd place, silver medalist(s)	Larry Myricks	United States	8.12	x	7.95	8.28	8.58w	8.43	8.58w	
3rd place, bronze medalist(s)	Jaime Jefferson	Cuba	8.11	8.16w	8.40	8.48w	8.31	8.51	8.51	NR
4	Lester Benjamin	Antigua and Barbuda	x	7.68	x	x	8.01w	x	8.01w	
5	Carlos Casar	Mexico	7.76w	7.40	7.34	x	x	7.11	7.76w	
6	Olivier Cadier	Brazil	7.34	7.46	6.90	x	7.54w	7.41	7.54w	
7	Ian James	Canada	7.45	x	x	x	7.52w	x	7.52w	
8	Ray Quiñones	Puerto Rico	7.30	7.35	x	7.32	x	7.46w	7.46w	
9	Norbett Elliot	Bahamas	7.35	7.20	x				7.35	
10	Fernando Valiente	Peru	7.10	x	7.10				7.10	
11	Ricardo Valiente	Peru	x	6.86	6.96				6.96	
	Mark Mason	Guyana	x	x	x				NM	
