= Wilfredo Ferrer =

Venezuelan athlete

Personal information
- Full name: Wilfredo Manuel Ferrer Carrera
- Born: 4 October 1962 (age 63) Guanta, Venezuela

Sport
- Sport: Athletics
- Event: 400 metres hurdles

Wilfredo Manuel Ferrer Carrera (born 4 October 1962) is a retired Venezuelan athlete who specialised in the 400 metres hurdles. He represented his country at the 1987 World Championships in Rome without advancing from the first round.

His personal best in the event is 50.34 set in Caracas in 1991.

== International competitions ==
Year	Competition	Venue	Position	Event	Notes
Representing Venezuela
1985	South American Championships	Santiago, Chile	3rd	400 m hurdles	51.36
1985	South American Championships	Santiago, Chile	3rd	4 × 100 m relay	40.87
1985	South American Championships	Santiago, Chile	3rd	4 × 400 m relay	3:11.29
1986	Central American and Caribbean Games	Santiago, Dominican Republic	10th (h)	400 m hurdles	52.94
1987	World Championships	Rome, Italy	45th (h)	400 m hurdles	53.03
1989	Bolivarian Games	Maracaibo, Venezuela	1st	400 m hurdles	51.56
1989	Central American and Caribbean Championships	San Juan, Puerto Rico	3rd	400 m hurdles	50.95
1989	South American Championships	Medellín, Colombia	4th	400 m hurdles	52.77
1989	South American Championships	Medellín, Colombia	1st	4 × 400 m relay	3:05.76
1990	Central American and Caribbean Games	Mexico City, Mexico	4th	400 m hurdles	52.89
1990	Central American and Caribbean Games	Mexico City, Mexico	5th	4 × 400 m relay	3:12.44
1993	Bolivarian Games	Cochabamba, Bolivia	2nd	400 m hurdles	52.46
