= Patricia Pérez (athlete) =

Chilean sprinter (born 1966)

Personal information
- Full name: Patricia Juliana Pérez Herrera
- Born: 13 September 1966 (age 60)

Sport
- Sport: Athletics
- Events: 100 m, 200 m
Medal record
Representing Chile
South American Games
Gold medal – first place	1986 Santiago	100m
Silver medal – second place	1986 Santiago	4x100m relay

Patricia Juliana Pérez Herrera (born 13 September 1966) is a retired Chilean sprinter. She won several medals at continental level.

== International competitions ==
Year	Competition	Venue	Position	Event	Notes
Representing Chile
1980	South American Junior Championships	Santiago, Chile	1st	4 × 100 m relay	47.10
1981	South American Junior Championships	Rio de Janeiro, Brazil	1st	100 m	12.2
1981	South American Junior Championships	Rio de Janeiro, Brazil	4th	200 m	25.0
1981	South American Junior Championships	Rio de Janeiro, Brazil	3rd	4 × 100 m relay	47.3
1981	South American Championships	La Paz, Bolivia	7th	200 m	25.0
1981	South American Championships	La Paz, Bolivia	4th	4 × 100 m relay	47.8
1981	South American Championships	La Paz, Bolivia	3rd	4 × 400 m relay	3:59.3
1984	South American Junior Championships	Caracas, Venezuela	1st	100 m	11.85
1984	South American Junior Championships	Caracas, Venezuela	2nd	200 m	24.75
1984	South American Junior Championships	Caracas, Venezuela	2nd	4 × 100 m relay	47.24
1985	South American Championships	Santiago, Chile	1st	100 m	11.78
1985	South American Championships	Santiago, Chile	2nd	200 m	24.13
1985	South American Championships	Santiago, Chile	1st	4 × 100 m relay	45.80
1986	South American Games	Santiago, Chile	1st	100 m	11.90
1986	South American Games	Santiago, Chile	2nd	4 × 100 m relay	46.76
1987	Universiade	Zagreb, Yugoslavia	14th (sf)	100 m	12.01

== Personal bests ==
Outdoor

- 100 metres – 11.78 (-0.1, Santiago 1985)
- 200 metres – 24.13 (+0.4, Santiago 1985)
