= Luis Hiraldo =

Puerto Rican jockey (1992–2023)

- Born: 1992
- Died: 20 July 2023 (aged 31); Canóvanas, Puerto Rico
- Occupation: Horse racing jockey
- Children: 2

Luis Hiraldo Carrasquillo (1992 – 20 July 2023) was a Puerto Rican horse racing jockey. A winner of 14 horse racing classics, he won 1,118 out of the 6,506 races in which he participated.

== Career ==
Hiraldo debuted in 2010. He won 177 races in Puerto Rico that year, having participated in 958, to become the top rookie in that country for that year and the second-winningest jockey there in 2010, behind Juan Carlos Diaz.

In 2013, Hiraldo participated in the Clasico del Caribe horse racing classic in Panama City, Panama, riding a horse named "Son de Goma". He and the horse finished in fourth place in that international competition. He had won two-thirds of the Puerto Rican triple crown that year with the same horse.

Also during 2013, Hiraldo suffered a dangerous injury when, riding on the fifth race of the day on May 26, 2013, his horse, El Bomberito, suffered an injury and fell to the ground, Hiraldo then getting run over by a horse named New Government, which was commanded by jockey Hector Miguel Diaz, who tried unsuccessfully to evade Hiraldo. Hiraldo was hospitalized at Centro Medico hospital in San Juan and later at Hospital Industrial with a small injury to one of his ribs. As a consequence of the accident Hiraldo was unable to compete in that year's "Governor's Cup".

On 14 July 2023, Hiraldo won what turned out to be his last victory, riding a horse named "El Profe".

== Personal life and death ==
Hiraldo had a son and a daughter.

On 20 July 2023, someone called the 9-1-1 emergency number in Puerto Rico to report a medical emergency at Hiraldo's home in Canovanas, Puerto Rico. When the emergency personnel arrived, they found Hiraldo's body. Puerto Rican police are investigating the case. Hiraldo was 31.

=== Reactions to his death ===
Axel Vizcarra, president of the Puerto Rican Jockeys Confederation, was one of the first prominent figures to react to Hiraldo's death, declaring that "It's news that has everyone consternated. Luis was very well liked by everyone in horse racing, particularly so his race mates. Our wish is to send a message of solidarity to his family and his small children. (His death) took us all by surprise. He kept working with the horses. This leaves us surprised."

For their part, Hipódromo Camarero officials noted that "Hipódromo Camarero joins in the sorrow that has overcome the family of professional jockey Luis Hiraldo, who died today, on Thursday ... we extend a strong hug to his family, with the most fervent desire for strength and for Luis to be resting in peace with the Lord."

== See also ==
- List of Puerto Ricans
