= Olivier Cadier =

Personal information
- Full name: Olivier Charles Cadier
- Born: 5 August 1960 (age 65)

Sport
- Sport: Athletics
- Event: Long jump

Olivier Charles Cadier (born 5 August 1960) is a retired Brazilian athlete who specialised in the long jump. He won several medals at regional level.

His personal best in the event is 7.94 metres set in São Paulo in 1986.

== International competitions ==
Year	Competition	Venue	Position	Event	Notes
Representing Brazil
1985	South American Championships	Santiago, Chile	2nd	Long jump	7.46 m
1986	Ibero-American Championships	Havana, Cuba	3rd	Long jump	7.72 m
1987	Pan American Games	Indianapolis, United States	6th	Long jump	7.54 m (w)
1988	Ibero-American Championships	Mexico City, Mexico	5th	Long jump	7.77 m
1989	South American Championships	Medellín, Colombia	3rd	Long jump	7.68 m
