= Oscar Barrionuevo =

Argentine sprinter

Personal information
- Full name: Oscar Alberto Barrionuevo
- Born: 7 May 1963 (age 63)

Sport
- Sport: Athletics
- Event(s): 100 metres, 200 metres

Oscar Alberto Barrionuevo (born 7 May 1963) is a retired Argentinian sprinter. He won several medals at regional level. In addition, he was a five-time national champion in the 100 and 200 metres.

== International competitions ==
Year	Competition	Venue	Position	Event	Notes
Representing Argentina
1981	South American Junior Championships	Rio de Janeiro, Brazil	3rd	4 × 100 m relay	42.0
1983	South American Championships	Santa Fe, Argentina	6th	100 m	10.8
1983	South American Championships	Santa Fe, Argentina	2nd	4 × 100 m relay	40.8
1985	South American Championships	Santiago, Chile	4th	100 m	10.79
1985	South American Championships	Santiago, Chile	2nd	200 m	21.42
1985	South American Championships	Santiago, Chile	4th	4 × 100 m relay	41.17
1985	South American Championships	Santiago, Chile	2nd	4 × 400 m relay	3:10.21
1986	Ibero-American Championships	Havana, Cuba	7th	100 m	10.66
1986	Ibero-American Championships	Havana, Cuba	6th	200 m	21.59
1986	Ibero-American Championships	Havana, Cuba	5th	4 × 100 m relay	41.69
1986	South American Games	Santiago, Chile	2nd	100 m	10.75
1986	South American Games	Santiago, Chile	4th	200 m	21.55
1986	South American Games	Santiago, Chile	4th	4 × 100 m relay	
1986	South American Games	Santiago, Chile	2nd	4 × 400 m relay	3:12.95
1987	South American Championships	São Paulo, Brazil	8th	100 m	11.00
1987	South American Championships	São Paulo, Brazil	2nd	4 × 100 m relay	40.72

== Personal bests ==
Outdoor

- 100 metres – 10.66 (+1.8 m/s, Havana 1986), 10.3 h (+1.6 m/s, Laguna-Tenerife 1986)
- 200 metres – 21.42 (Buenos Aires 1984)
- 400 metres – 48.72 (Buenos Aires 1984), 48.5 h (Buenos Aires 1985)
