= Norman H. Davila =

Puerto Rican sportscaster, writer, educator and amateur baseball player (born 1943)

Norman Hopgood Dávila
- Born: 1943 (age 82–83); San Juan, Puerto Rico.
- Occupations: Sports commentator, journalist, teacher
- Spouse: Belén Matías Acevedo
- Children: Marisol, Javier, René
- Parent(s): Norman M. Hopgood Casanova and Elena Dávila Blázquez

Norman Hopgood Dávila (born 1943) is a Puerto Rican former television sports broadcaster, writer and amateur baseball player. He is mostly remembered for his 50-year tenure as a radio and television broadcaster of horse racing in the island, from Hipodromo El Comandante in Carolina and Hipodromo Camarero (originally known as "El Nuevo Comandante") in the northern Puerto Rican city of Canóvanas. Dávila's most famous phrase is "Y abren las compuertas, y estan en carrera!" ("And the floodgates open, and they are racing!"), which he pronounced at the start of each race that he covered over his 50 years on the Puerto Rican radio and television transmissions. Dávila, who is also a former basketball and professional boxing sportscaster, is a member of the Puerto Rican Horse Racing Hall of Fame.

By a Telemundo estimate, Dávila has narrated more than 70,000 horse races in Puerto Rico.

== Early life ==
The first time Dávila went to the racetrack was when his dad took him at a very young age, to watch horse races at Hipodromo Quintana, which was located near Residencial Las Casas in Santurce. He dreamed of becoming a horse-racing jockey as a youth.

Dávila developed into a good local baseball player, and he played for a local, Puerto Rican winter baseball league Double-A team in the city of Cataño, near San Juan. Around this time, the young man also became a teacher, working for the Puerto Rico Public Education Department as a physical education teacher.

== Broadcasting career ==
Dávila started out as a writer for a Puerto Rican newspaper, El Mundo, in 1965, which allowed Puerto Rican horse racing fans to familiarize themselves with Dávila's name for the first time.

Because he was by then known as a horse racing expert, Dávila was given an opportunity to audition for a radio horse races show on WKAQ, a Puerto Rican AM radio station. This show was co-hosted by the legendary actor and comedian, José Miguel Agrelot and by Mariano Artau. This opportunity surged when previous horse races broadcaster, Agapito "Pito" Rivera Monge, himself a member of the Puerto Rican Horse Racing Hall of Fame also, decided to retire from the radio show. Dávila was hired soon after. Monge had decided to become a television horse racing sportscaster, a role which later on, Dávila himself would fill.

Dávila was 27 years old when he first was assigned to cover races on Puerto Rican radio in 1971. His became a familiar face and voice with Puerto Rican sports fans, both horse racing and other sports' ones, and Dávila became known as "the national voice of horse racing" on the tiny Caribbean sea island-nation. Dávila first started out covering races from Hipódromo El Comandante in Carolina (a city next to San Juan), before that building was closed and operations moved to Camarero Hippodrome in Canóvanas, which was during that era known as "Hipodromo El Nuevo Comandante".

Soon, Dávila himself made the jump to television sports commentary. For decades, he narrated the races simultaneously on Puerto Rican TV channels such as Canal 7 and on radio, and, from 2014 on, at Teleisla, the new Canal 7.

One of the peculiarities he was known for during his 50 year tenure as a broadcaster was his use of binoculars during race transmissions. This allowed him to see horses better and get their names right.

Dávila retired as a broadcaster after the final race that took place on December 26, 2022. He was replaced by Joe Bruno, to whom Dávila symbolically passed on the show's reigns and his binoculars on December 30 of that year in an event that was attended by Dávila's family and the Puerto Rican press.

== Other sports ==
Dávila was also a basketball, baseball, boxing and volleyball television broadcaster, and he was the director of the Puerto Rican Women's Professional Volleyball League and the BSN or Baloncesto Superior Nacional de Puerto Rico. He was recognized by the Puerto Rican senate for his contributions to sport in the island.

As a basketball sportscaster, Dávila was involved with some of the Puerto Rico men's national basketball team's international broadcasts.

A big boxing fan, he interviewed, among other figures, a young Felix Trinidad.

== See also ==
- List of Puerto Ricans
- Junior Abrams
- Rafael Bracero
- Ernesto Diaz Gonzalez
- Manolo Rivera Morales
- Fufi Santori
- El Platino -famous Puerto Rican racehorse whose races were often broadcast by Dávila on television
