= Manolo Rivera Morales =

Puerto Rican sportscaster

- Born: May 14, 1923; Trujillo Alto, Puerto Rico
- Died: May 25, 2000 (aged 77)
- Occupations: Sports commentator, Journalist

Manuel Rivera Morales (aka "Manolo", "El Olimpico", "Mr. Apuntenlo") (May 14, 1923 – May 25, 2000) (in Spanish) was a Puerto Rican sportscaster, radio announcer and marketing sales executive. Rivera Morales is considered by many to be the best sportscaster in Puerto Rican history. "The achievements of 'El Olimpico' (The Olympian) have given him national and international regard and have left huge prints in our hearts." (Puerto Rican Legislature, Law #228, 1998)

== Early life ==
Rivera Morales was born in Trujillo Alto, Puerto Rico on May 14, 1923. He was inducted in the Hall of Fame for Puerto Rican Sports on November 22, 1992. In 1998 the Government of Puerto Rico honored Rivera by naming a main highway after him: PR-181 Road, "Expreso Manuel Rivera Morales", also known as "El Expreso de Trujillo Alto" (Trujillo Alto Expressway).

== Career ==
Manuel Rivera Morales gained nationwide fame in Puerto Rico during the 1960s, 1970s and 1980s, when he covered BSN basketball games live, first on radio, and later on television, for various broadcasters (most famously WAPA-TV), along other famous Puerto Rican sportscasters such as Johnny Flores Monge, Rafael Bracero and Fufi Santori. Rivera Morales became a cultural icon in Puerto Rico: His phrases, many of which he invented, were commonly repeated by many Puerto Ricans and became part of colloquial Puerto Rican dialogue.

When he accompanied the Puerto Rican team that played the 1964 Olympic Games in Tokyo to broadcast the games through radio, his style was so colorful and attracted so much attention that a local Japanese newspaper covered him. In Japan, he was also recognized with a medal as "The World's Best and Most Dramatic Narrator". He started as an Olympic sportscaster in the 1960 Olympics held in Rome and continued during the following games: 1964 Tokyo, 1968 Mexico, 1972 Munich y 1976 Montreal. Due to this vast Olympic experience, he was nicknamed "El Olimpico" (The Olympian). He also was a narrator for the Pan-American Games and for the famous "Roller Derby" television show (Puerto Rico's Spanish version).

Morales was also recognized for giving nicknames to some of Puerto Rico's basketball players. José Ortiz, for example, was nicknamed "El Concorde" by Rivera Morales. Mario Morales became "El Quijote" (was better known by his nickname than by his real name), José Sosa "El Galgo" (The Greyhound), Angel "Cachorro" Santiago "El Orgullo del Caserio" (The Pride of the Housing Projects), Hector "El Mago" Blondet (The Magician), Rolando Frazier "El Principe" (The Prince), Mario Butler "El Expreso Panameño" (The Panamanian Express), Ruben Rodriguez "Sharp Shooter", and Martín Ansa got the nickname "El Señor" from Morales.

During the 1970s and 1980s, local laws established that boxing fights held in Puerto Rico could not be transmitted live on television; this to encourage fans to pay tickets to see the fights live. They were, however, transmitted live by radio, and Rivera Morales also became a well-known boxing commentator on the Puerto Rican radio stations. In the 1970s he also announced professional wrestling. He also announced horse racing events from Hipódromo Camarero along with Norman H. Davila, among others.

== Death ==
Rivera Morales suffered from Parkinson's disease. He died on 25 May 2000.

== Legacy ==
In 2020, 21 years after Rivera Morales death and during the 2020 Summer Olympics, his voice was heard commenting when the Puerto Rico women's national basketball team played. The arduous project, accomplished with the help of artificial intelligence was completed in partnership with the Cervecera de Puerto Rico and the Puerto Rico Olympic Committee.

== His popular phrases ==
Some phrases popularized by Manuel Rivera Morales include:

- "¡Apuntenlo!!" (score it!!) - His trademark phrase, and a reminder to the radio crew's scorer to write down the latest successful two-point basket.

- "¡Manos Arriba!! Manos Arriba!" (Hands up! Hands up!) After a three-point shot had been made, alluding to the gesture that basketball referees do after a three-point basket.

- "¡Que juego señores... que juego!" (What a great game gentlemen... what a great game.)

- "¡Me va a poner a gozar... y me puso a gozar!" (He's going to make me enjoy... he made me enjoy.) Referring to a dunk.

- "Yo lo conozco... va a tirar..." (I know him... he's going to shoot.) Anticipating a play.

- "¡Miralooooooooo!" (Look at him.) Anticipating a basket.

- "¡Ayúdanos, divina Pastora, a salir de aqui con vida!" (Help us, "Divine Shepherdess", to get out of here alive!!) A religious imploration used by him in a playfull tone when a basketball game was close enough for the visiting team to steal a win during the closing minutes, he also used this phrase when the visiting team's lead was deemed as too large to overcome with a short time left in the game.

- "Wonderful!!"

- "¡Sensacional!" (Sensational) He'd say this after an impressive play.

- "Mi abuela decía: '¡Son de goma, Manolo, son de goma!'" (My grandma used to say: "they're made out of rubber, Manolo, they're made out of rubber"!) - Said after a player fell dramatically and recuperated quickly.

- "¡Wes... Wes... Wes... WES!!" -Whenever local (and later international) player Wesley Correa charged to the basket.

- "¡Este juego es no apto para cardiacos!" (This game is not suitable for cardiac patients!) - Said during close games, particularly those that ended up in overtime (at a particular one that had five OT's he almost had a cardiac incident himself).

== See also ==
- Ernesto Diaz Gonzalez
- Junior Abrams
- List of Puerto Ricans
