= Eduardo Cabrera =

Peruvian politician (1947–2020)

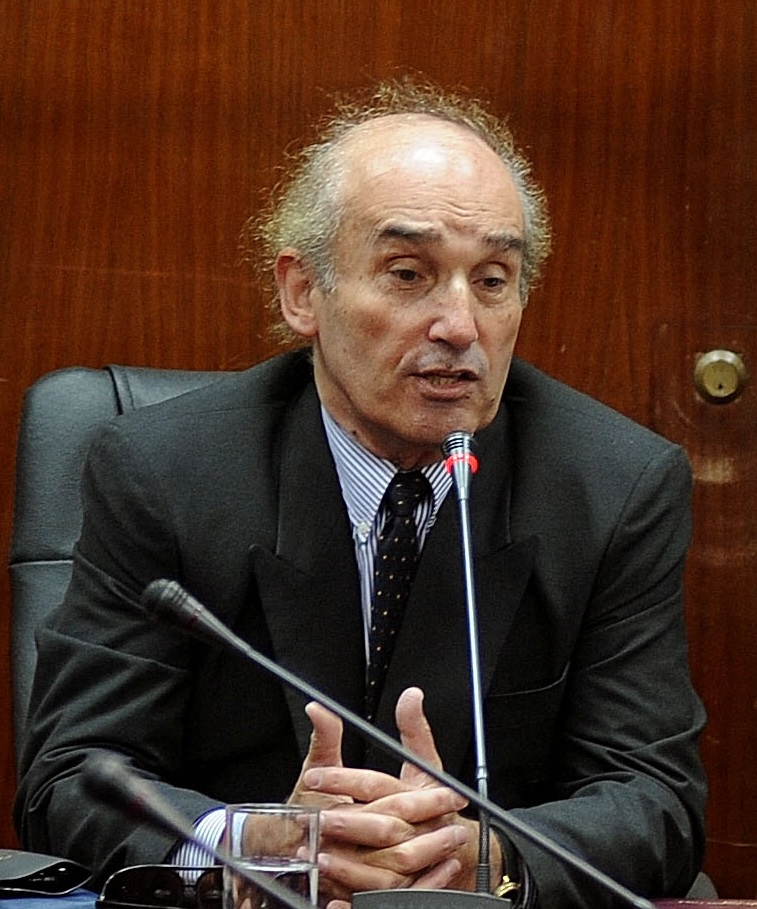

Member of Congress
- In office 26 July 2011 – 26 July 2016
- Constituency: Ica

Personal details
- Born: Eduardo Felipe Cabrera Ganoza; 11 April 1947 Lima, Peru
- Died: 28 February 2020 (aged 72) Lima, Peru
- Party: Popular Force
- Other political affiliations: Sí Cumple
- Occupation: Politician
- Profession: Engineer

Eduardo Felipe Cabrera Ganoza (11 April 1947 – 28 February 2020) was a Peruvian engineer and Fujimorist politician. He was a congressman of the Republic for the department of Ica during the period 2011-2016.

== Biography ==
Cabrera was born in Lima, Peru, on April 11, 1947. He completed his primary and secondary studies at the Colegio Sagrados Corazones Recoleta in his hometown. Between 1970 and 1975 he studied geological engineering at the Universidad Nacional Mayor de San Marcos. His professional activity took place in the private sphere as manager or president of the board of companies and owner of an agricultural estate in the department of Ica.

He died in the city of Lima, on February 28, 2020, victim of pneumonia. He was buried in the Parque de Recuerdo cemetery in Lurín.
