= Secretary of Sports and Recreation of Puerto Rico =

Government of Puerto Rico

- Incumbent; Hector Vazquez Muñiz since January 2, 2025; 20 months ago
- Department of Sports and Recreation
- Nominator: Governor
- Appointer: Governor with advice and consent from the Senate
- Term length: 4 years
- Formation: Established by Act No. 8 of 2004
- Website: www.drd.gobierno.pr

The secretary of sports and recreation of Puerto Rico (Spanish: Secretario de Recración y Deportes) is responsible for the development and management of all matters related to sports and recreation in the government of Puerto Rico. The secretary heads the Department of Sports and Recreation.

== Secretaries ==
- 1980–1982: Prof. Jose C. Barbosa Muniz
- 1982–1983: Pedro Barez Rosario
- 1983–1984: Edwin Rivero Paulo
- 1985–1991: Leonardo "Leo" Gonzalez Rivera
- 1991–1992: Dr. Ibrahim Perez Llorens
- 1993–1995: Marimer Olazagasti Gonzalez
- 1995–2000: Eric R. Labrador Rosa
- 2001–2004: Jorge L. "George" Rosario Noriega
- 2005–2008: Dr. David E. Bernier Rivera
- 2008–2008: Prof. Luz M. "Lucy" Molinary Garcia
- 2009–2012: Henry E. Neumann Zayas
- 2013–2016: Ramón E. Orta Rodriguez
- 2017–2018: Andres W. Volmar Méndez
- 2018–2020: Adriana G. Sánchez Parés
- 2021–2024: Ray J. Quiñones Vazquez
- 2025–present: Hector Vazquez Muñiz
