= Yvette Bonapart =

Surinamese sprinter

Personal information
- Nationality: Surinamese
- Born: 5 January 1965
- Died: 16 June 2023 (aged 58)

Sport
- Sport: Sprinting
- Event: 100 metres

Yvette Bonapart (5 January 1965 – 16 June 2023) was a Surinamese sprinter. She competed in the women's 100 metres at the 1988 Summer Olympics. She was the first woman to represent Suriname at the Olympics.
