= Pedro da Silva (decathlete) =

Brazilian decathlete

Personal information
- Born: October 24, 1966 (age 60) Resende, Rio de Janeiro, Brazil

Sport
- Sport: Track and field
Medal record
Representing Brazil
Pan American Games
| Gold medal – first place | 1991 Havana | Decathlon |

Pedro Ferreira da Silva Filho (born October 24, 1966) is a former decathlete from Brazil. He won the gold medal in the men's decathlon event at the 1991 Pan American Games in Havana, Cuba, and competed for his native country at the 1992 Summer Olympics.

Silva competed for the Oregon Ducks track and field team in the NCAA.

His personal best of 8266 points, set in Walnut, California in 1987, lasted twenty-five years as the Brazilian record. Luiz Alberto de Araújo bettered this mark at the 2012 Brazilian championships. He won three straight decathlon title at the South American Junior Championships in Athletics from 1983 to 1985. He was also the silver medallist at the 1984 Pan American Junior Athletics Championships.

== International competitions ==
| Year | Competition | Venue | Position | Event | Notes |
Representing Brazil
| 1985 | South American Championships | Santiago, Chile | 5th | Decathlon | 6354 pts |
| 1987 | Pan American Games | Indianapolis, United States | – | Decathlon | DNF |
| 1987 | World Championships | Rome, Italy | — | Decathlon | DNF |
| 1989 | South American Championships | Medellín, Colombia | 6th | Decathlon | 6619 pts |
| 1990 | Ibero-American Championships | Manaus, Brazil | 4th | Decathlon | 6440 pts |
| 1991 | Pan American Games | Havana, Cuba | 1st | Decathlon | 7762 pts |
| 1991 | World Championships | Tokyo, Japan | — | Decathlon | DNF |
| 1992 | Ibero-American Championships | Seville, Spain | — | Pole vault | NM |
| 1992 | Ibero-American Championships | Seville, Spain | 14th | Long jump | 6.79 m w (+2.2 m/s) |
| 1992 | Olympic Games | Barcelona, Spain | — | Decathlon | DNF |
| 1995 | Pan American Games | Mar del Plata, Argentina | 5th | Decathlon | 6692 pts |
| 1995 | South American Championships | Manaus, Brazil | 1st | Decathlon | 7374 pts |
