= Elba Barbosa =

Brazilian runner

Personal information
- Born: 9 December 1962 (age 63)

Sport
- Sport: Athletics
- Event(s): 400 metres, 800 metres

Elba Barbosa (born 9 December 1962) is a retired Brazilian runner who competed in the 400 and 800 metres. She won several medals at continental level.

== International competitions ==
| Year | Competition | Venue | Position | Event | Notes |
Representing Brazil
| 1980 | South American Junior Championships | Santiago, Chile | 5th | 200 m | 25.36 |
| 1980 | South American Junior Championships | Santiago, Chile | 1st | 400 m | 56.67 |
| 1980 | South American Junior Championships | Santiago, Chile | 3rd | 4 × 100 m relay | 47.64 |
| 1980 | South American Junior Championships | Santiago, Chile | 1st | 4 × 400 m relay | 3:43.4 |
| 1981 | South American Junior Championships | Rio de Janeiro, Brazil | 1st | 400 m | 55.2 |
| 1981 | South American Junior Championships | Rio de Janeiro, Brazil | 1st | 4 × 400 m relay | 3:43.9 |
| 1981 | South American Championships | La Paz, Bolivia | 5th | 400 m | 58.3 |
| 1981 | South American Championships | La Paz, Bolivia | 1st | 4 × 400 m relay | 3:49.4 |
| 1983 | South American Championships | Santa Fe, Argentina | 1st | 400 m | 54.0 |
| 1983 | South American Championships | Santa Fe, Argentina | 1st | 4 × 100 m relay | 45.4 |
| 1983 | South American Championships | Santa Fe, Argentina | 1st | 4 × 400 m relay | 3:40.0 |
| 1985 | South American Championships | Santiago, Chile | 2nd | 400 m | 54.36 |
| 1985 | South American Championships | Santiago, Chile | 3rd | 800 m | 2:09.21 |
| 1985 | South American Championships | Santiago, Chile | 1st | 4 × 400 m relay | 3:39.77 |
| 1986 | Ibero-American Championships | Havana, Cuba | 4th | 4 × 400 m relay | 3:45.34 |

== Personal bests ==
Outdoor

- 400 metres – 53.1 (São Paulo 1983)
- 800 metres – 2:03.24 (Irvine 1990)
- 1000 metres – 2:45.39 (Brussels 1990)
