= Tracy Baskin =

American middle-distance runner

Personal information
- Nationality: American
- Born: November 3, 1965 (age 60) Stafford, Texas, United States

Sport
- Sport: Middle-distance running
- Event: 800 metres

Tracy Baskin (born November 3, 1965) is an American middle-distance runner. He competed in the men's 800 metres at the 1988 Summer Olympics.

Competing for the Seton Hall Pirates track and field team, Baskin won the 1987 NCAA Division I Outdoor Track and Field Championships in the 800 m.
