= Isabel Oliva =

Spanish poet (b. 1924)

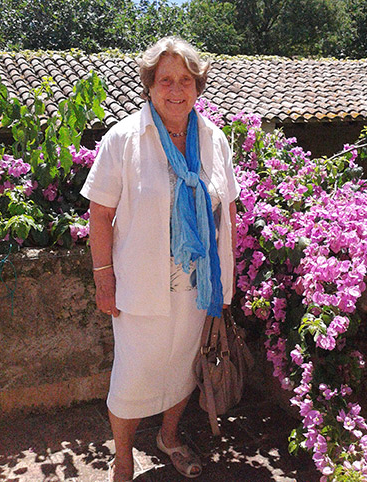
- Born: November 27, 1924 (age 101) Girona, Catalonia, Spain
- Language: Catalan

Isabel Oliva Prat (born 27 November 1924, Girona) is a Spanish poet in the Catalan language.

== Biography ==
Prat was born in Girona, and attended school there. Her father died shortly before the Spanish Civil War.

Prat became a teacher after graduating from Escola Normal de Mestres. Her first position was in Espolla, where she met Francisco Torrado, whom she married in 1950. The couple had three children. After Torrado died, Prat returned to education, working as a Catalan language teacher in Font de la Pólvora.

She studied Teaching and Music, and she worked as a teacher in several educational centers. Her father and uncle were music teachers and encouraged her from a young age to cultivate the art of music.

Prat was always a great fan of poetry, but did not begin to write and publish poetry of her own until after her retirement.

== Bibliography ==
- Laberint de Dèdal
- Jardí retrobat (2002)
- Fil de vidre (2003)
- Rellotge de sorra - Haikús (2004)
- Quadern de botànica (2004)
- L'instant de l'àngel (2004)
- Contrallum amb orquídia (2005)
- Col·leccionista de tardes (2007)
- L'estoig del violí (2008)
- Ària per a una sola corda (2011)
- L'obrador del vitraller (2011)
- La capsa carmesí (2012)
- Les guardes del ventall (2012)
- L'últim revolt de la paraula (2013)
- Crepuscles sobre el Moldava (2015)
- Passeig d'hivern (2016)
- Temps d'Aram (2018)
- "Llum a les golfes". Haikús de Sam Abrams. 2019. pp. 85–86.
- La persistència de la memòria (2020)

== Awards ==
- 2000 Terra de Fang de Deltebre, for Laberint de Dèdal
- Guillem Viladot (2001)
- Narcís Saguer (2001, 2005)
- Goleta i Bergantí (2007)
- Francesc Castells (2012, 2016)
