= George Biehl =

Chilean footballer (born 1963)

Personal information
- Full name: George Alex Biehl Saldías
- Date of birth: 24 September 1963 (age 63)
- Place of birth: Valparaíso, Chile
- Height: 1.88 m (6 ft 2 in)
- Position: Defender

Senior career*
Years	Team	Apps	(Gls)
1980–1981	Las Colinas	–	(–)
1988–1990	Audax Italiano		(27)
1991	Santiago Wanderers	25	(4)
1992–1993	Colo-Colo	38	(3)
1994	Deportes Antofagasta	25	(1)
1995–1998	Coquimbo Unido	92	(3)
1999	Unión Española		(0)

Managerial career
- 2000–2004: Universidad Católica (youth)
- 2005–2006: Universidad Católica (assistant)
- 2007–2008: UA Maracaibo (assistant)
- 2008–2009: Chile U15
- 2009: Chile U20 (assistant)
- 2011–2012: Chile U17
Medal record
Men's athletics
Representing Chile
South American Junior Championships
Silver medal – second place	1980 Santiago	110 metres hurdles
South American Championships
Bronze medal – third place	1985 Santiago	110 metres hurdles
South American Games
Silver medal – second place	1986 Santiago	110 metres hurdles
Bronze medal – third place	1986 Santiago	decathlon
- * Club domestic league appearances and goals

George Alex Biehl Saldías (born 24 September 1963) is a Chilean former athlete and professional footballer who played as a defender.

== Athletics ==
During the 80s, Biehl competed in 110 metres hurdles, becoming the Chilean champion between 1980 and 1987, and decathlon, becoming the Chilean champion between 1986 and 1987. At youth level, he represented Chile and won the silver medal in 110 metres hurdles at the 1980 South American Junior Championship.

At senior level, Biehl represented Chile at the 1983 South American Championship, the 1985 South American Championship (bronze in 110 metres hurdles), the 1986 South American Games (silver in 110 metres hurdles and bronze in decathlon) and the 1987 Pan American Games.

== Football career ==
At amateur level, Biehl played for Club Deportivo Las Colinas from Viña del Mar in 1980 and 1981. Once he left athletics, he joined Audax Italiano in 1988 at the Chilean Segunda División.

In 1991, Biehl signed with Santiago Wanderers for the Chilean Primera División. The next years, he continued with Colo-Colo, Deportes Antofagasta and Coquimbo Unido in the top level. With Colo-Colo, he won the 1992 Recopa Sudamericana, the 1991 Copa Interamericana (played in September 1992) and the 1993 Primera División de Chile.

He ended his career with Unión Española, winning the 1999 Primera B de Chile.

== Coaching career ==
Biehl started his coaching career with the Universidad Católica youth ranks at the beginning of the 2000s and later served as assistant coach of Jorge Pellicer in the first team. He continued with Pellicer in Venezuelan club Unión Atlético Maracaibo and with Ivo Basay in Chile U20.

As a head coach, Biehl led Chile U15 and Chile U17 from 2008 to 2012.

== Personal life ==
His father, Otto, was a German descendant businessman from Valparaíso and one of the founders of Club Atlético de los SS.CC. de Valparaíso y Viña del Mar, an athletics club where George began his career outside his hometown.
