= Ernesto Díaz González =

Puerto Rican sportscaster

- Born: 1939; Río Piedras, Puerto Rico
- Died: September 12, 2025 (aged 85–86)
- Occupations: sportscaster, journalist, sports executive

Ernesto Ramón Díaz González (1939-2025) was a Puerto Rican sportscaster who has worked since 1962 on Puerto Rican television. Díaz González has narrated various sports such as baseball and boxing, but he is better known for his narration of BSN and Puerto Rican men's national team basketball games. Ernesto Díaz González is also known by the Puerto Rican public as "Ernestito".

== Biography ==
Ernesto Diaz Gonzalez born in Río Piedras, Puerto Rico grew up as a fan of cockfighting. His father took him to watch cockfights at a local cockfighting arena when he was about 11 or 12 years old. Later, Diaz Gonzalez attended university, where he began learning some phrases that he would later use during basketball game transmissions.

By 1980, Diaz Gonzalez had been hired as a special-events sportscaster by Telemundo Puerto Rico, which had Junior Abrams as their main sportscaster and sports news reporter. In 1985, Diaz Gonzalez moved to Telemundo Puerto Rico's rival station canal 4.

By 1986, Díaz González was also the president of the Metros de San Juan of the Roberto Clemente Professional Baseball League.

== 2014 Puerto Rican Sports Hall of Fame Controversy ==
During its 2014 induction ceremony, the Puerto Rican Sports Hall of Fame was to induct Díaz González as a sportscaster, along with former baseball players Bernie Williams and Carlos Baerga, and former basketball player Jerome Mincy. Díaz González, however, did not accept the induction, alleging that he had felt shunned by the Hall of Fame for 15 prior years. (in Spanish)

== Personal life ==
Díaz González was married to Norma Hernández, who inspired him to use some phrases during basketball game transmissions.

== Phrases ==
Díaz González has coined some phrases during televised basketball games that have become popular in Puerto Rican Spanish jargon. Some are:

- "Gulu gulu y pa' fuera" (loosely translated to "round and round and it goes out")-when someone's shot goes around the rim and then drops out.
- "Y va seguir!" ("He-or she-keeps it going!")-when someone has scored many points and makes another basket
- "Agua pa' los gallos!" ("throw water at the cocks")-when a team has scored the basket likely to secure the game for them. Díaz González was inspired to use this by his days attending cockfights, where a beaten cock would get water thrown over it.
- "Échale" (loosely translated to "put it in")-when someone makes a three-point shot.
- "De lagrimita!" (loosely translated to "by a tear!") when a shot goes in after almost being missed

== Youtube channel ==
Diaz Gonzalez began his own Youtube.com channel, where he downloaded videos of past BSN basketball games.

== Death ==
Ernesto Díaz González died on the morning of September 12, 2025 at his home while in hospice care after a battle with pancreatic cancer. He was 85 years old.

== See also ==
- Manolo Rivera Morales
- Rafael Bracero-Fellow sportscaster and Diaz Gonzalez's sportscasting mate
- Fufi Santori
- List of Puerto Ricans
- Junior Abrams
- Norman H. Davila
