= 1985 South American Championships in Athletics =

- Dates: 12–15 September
- Host city: Santiago, Chile
- Venue: Estadio Nacional
- Participation: 252 athletes from 11 nations

The 33rd South American Championships in Athletics were held at the Estadio Nacional in Santiago, Chile, between 12 and 15 September.

It was the first edition to feature women's 10,000 metres event.

== Medal summary ==
=== Men's events ===
Event	Gold		Silver		Bronze	
100 metres (wind: -1.0 m/s)	Arnaldo da Silva; Brazil	10.39	Robson da Silva; Brazil	10.45	Enrique Canavire; Venezuela	10.69
200 metres (wind: -0.5 m/s)	Robson da Silva; Brazil	20.70	Oscar Barrionuevo; Argentina	21.42	Sérgio Menezes; Brazil	21.47
400 metres	Héctor Daley; Panama	46.06 CR	Sérgio Menezes; Brazil	46.53	Aaron Phillips; Venezuela	46.66
800 metres	Luis Migueles; Argentina	1:46.90 CR	Igor Costa; Brazil	1:47.61	Rinaldo Gomes; Brazil	1:49.35
1500 metres	Adauto Domingues; Brazil	3:42.16 CR	Emilio Ulloa; Chile	3:43.63	Ricardo Vera; Uruguay	3:46.87
5000 metres	Omar Aguilar; Chile	13:53.69 CR	Silvio Salazar; Colombia	14:03.18	João de Souza; Brazil	14:09.43
10,000 metres	Omar Aguilar; Chile	28:39.90 CR	João de Souza; Brazil	29:02.34	Silvio Salazar; Colombia	29:03.34
Marathon	Elói Schleder; Brazil	2:22:13	José San Martín; Chile	2:24:10	Mauricio Arancibia; Chile	2:26:41
110 metres hurdles (wind: -0.1 m/s)	Pedro Chiamulera; Brazil	13.87 AR	Joilto Bonfim; Brazil	14.21	George Biehl; Chile	14.40
400 metres hurdles	Pedro Chiamulera; Brazil	49.71 CR	Antônio Dias Ferreira; Brazil	50.36	Wilfredo Ferrer; Venezuela	51.36
3000 metres steeplechase	Adauto Domingues; Brazil	8:44.38 CR	Ricardo Vera; Uruguay	8:44.85	Emilio Ulloa; Chile	8:45.27
4 × 100 metres relay	Brazil; Olivier Cadier; Arnaldo da Silva; Paulo Lima; Robson da Silva	40.00	Chile; Boris Mihovilovic; Luis Sáez; Carlos Moreno; Álvaro Prenafeta	40.69	Venezuela; Wilfredo Ferrer; Enrique Canavire; José Mirena; Nelson Oquendo	40.87
4 × 400 metres relay	Brazil; Igor Costa; Pedro Chiamulera; Wilson dos Santos; Sérgio Menezes	3:07.96 CR	Argentina; Gustavo Capart; Luis Migueles; Oscar Barrionuevo; José María Beduino	3:10.21	Venezuela; José Castillo; Wilfredo Ferrer; Miguel Marcano; Aaron Phillips	3:11.29
20 kilometres road walk	Jorge Yannone; Argentina	1:39:04	Juan Yanes; Venezuela	1:42:23	Jorge Torrealba; Venezuela	1:45:41
High jump	Milton Riitano Francisco; Brazil	2.17 CR	Fernando Pastoriza; Argentina	2.11	Cláudio Freire; Brazil	2.08
Pole vault	Oscar Veit; Argentina	4.90 =CR	Jaime Silva; Chile	4.80	Elson de Souza; Brazil	4.80
Long jump	Enrique Canavire; Venezuela	7.54	Olivier Cadier; Brazil	7.46	Sergio Roh; Argentina	7.20
Triple jump	Francisco dos Santos; Brazil	16.87	Jailto Bonfim; Brazil	16.06	Roberto Audain; Venezuela	15.62
Shot put	Gert Weil; Chile	20.14 CR	Adilson Oliveira; Brazil	17.13	José Jara; Chile	16.20
Discus throw	José de Souza; Brazil	53.10	Carlos Brynner; Argentina	51.60	Otmar Welsch; Brazil	50.92
Hammer throw	Daniel Gómez; Argentina	60.26	Celso de Moraes; Brazil	60.20	Pedro Rivail Atílio; Brazil	60.04
Javelin throw	Juan Garmendia; Argentina	75.10 CR	Luis Lucumí; Colombia	70.64	Gustavo Wielandt; Chile	70.30
Decathlon	Paulo Lima; Brazil	7341	Carlos Martín; Argentina	6770	Claudio Escauriza; Paraguay	6599

=== Women's events ===
Event	Gold		Silver		Bronze	
100 metres (wind: -0.6 m/s)	Patricia Pérez; Chile	11.78	Claudiléia dos Santos; Brazil	12.02	Daisy Salas; Chile	12.11
200 metres (wind: +0.4 m/s)	Claudiléia dos Santos; Brazil	23.99	Patricia Pérez; Chile	24.13	Liliana Chalá; Ecuador	24.26
400 metres	Norfalia Carabalí; Colombia	53.25 CR	Elba Barbosa; Brazil	54.36	Margarita Grün; Uruguay	54.39 NR
800 metres	Alejandra Ramos; Chile	2:03.54 CR	Soraya Telles; Brazil	2:06.30	Elba Barbosa; Brazil	2:09.21
1500 metres	Alejandra Ramos; Chile	4:20.16 CR	Monica Regonesi; Chile	4:22.45	Fabiola Rueda; Colombia	4:22.63
3000 metres	Monica Regonesi; Chile	9:29.67 CR	Carmem de Oliveira; Brazil	9:30.37	Fabiola Rueda; Colombia	9:31.10
10,000 metres	Monica Regonesi; Chile	34:31.37 AR	Carmem de Oliveira; Brazil	34:47.02	Margot Vargas; Argentina	36:16.80
100 metres hurdles (wind: +0.5 m/s)	Beatriz Capotosto; Argentina	13.87	Susana Jenkins; Argentina	13.94	Juraciara da Silva; Brazil	13.97
400 metres hurdles	Maria do Carmo Fialho; Brazil	59.45 CR	Cornelia Holzinger; Brazil	60.28	Claudia Oxman; Chile	61.42
4 × 100 metres relay	Chile; Daisy Salas; Flavia Villar; Michelle Camino; Patricia Pérez	45.80	Brazil; Inês Ribeiro; Bárbara do Nascimento; Claudiléia dos Santos; Juraciara da Silva	46.09	Argentina; Julia Schuth; Graciela Palacín; Susana Jenkins; Beatriz Capotosto	46.80
4 × 400 metres relay	Brazil; Soraya Telles; Elba Barbosa; Cornelia Holzinguer; Maria do Carmo Fialho	3:39.77 CR	Uruguay; Margarita Grün; Carmen Mosegui; Claudia Acerenza; Soledad Acerenza	3:41.49	Chile; Flavia Villar; Ismenia Guzmán; Ximena Carvajal; Alejandra Ramos	3:43.85
High jump	Ana Maria Marcon; Brazil	1.88 CR	Carmen Garib; Chile	1.76	Conceição Geremias; Brazil	1.73
Long jump	Conceição Geremias; Brazil	6.04	Silvia Murialdo; Argentina	5.81	Graciela Acosta; Uruguay	5.81
Shot put	Maria Fernandes; Brazil	14.89	Jazmín Cirio; Chile	14.50	Marinalva dos Santos; Brazil	14.44
Discus throw	Márcia Barbosa; Brazil	46.16	Marinalva dos Santos; Brazil	43.50	Daphne Birnios; Argentina	42.20
Javelin throw	Mônica Rocha; Brazil	52.08 CR	Sueli dos Santos; Brazil	51.52	Patricia Guerrero; Peru	45.38
Heptathlon	Ana María Comaschi; Argentina	4866	Nancy Vallecilla; Ecuador	4865	Rita Geremias; Brazil	4710

== Medal table ==
Rank	Nation	Gold	Silver	Bronze	Total
1	Brazil (BRA)	21	19	12	52
2	Chile (CHI)	9	8	8	25
3	Argentina (ARG)	7	7	4	18
4	Colombia (COL)	1	2	3	6
5	Venezuela (VEN)	1	1	7	9
6	Panama (PAN)	1	0	0	1
7	Uruguay (URU)	0	2	3	5
8	Ecuador (ECU)	0	1	1	2
9	Paraguay (PAR)	0	0	1	1
9	Peru (PER)	0	0	1	1
Totals (10 entries)		40	40	40	120

== Participating nations ==
- Argentina (58)
- Bolivia (2)
- Brazil (50)
- Chile (62)
- Colombia (6)
- Ecuador (13)
- Panama (1)
- Paraguay (13)
- Peru (14)
- Uruguay (19)
- Venezuela (14)

== See also ==
- 1985 in athletics (track and field)
