= Cláudio Freire =

Brazilian high jumper

Personal information
- Born: 17 April 1957 (age 69) Rio de Janeiro, Brazil
- Height: 1.82 m (6 ft 0 in)
- Weight: 73 kg (161 lb)

Sport
- Sport: Athletics
- Event: High jump
- Club: AAUGF

Cláudio da Matta Freire (born 17 April 1957) is a Brazilian athlete. He competed in the men's high jump at the 1980 Summer Olympics.

His personal best in the event is 2.25 metres set in 1982.
