= Paul Osland =

Canadian middle-distance runner (born 1964)

Personal information
- Nationality: Canadian
- Born: 1 January 1964 (age 62) Downey, California, United States

Sport
- Sport: Sprinting
- Event: 800 metres

Paul Osland (born 1 January 1964) is a retired Canadian middle-distance runner who specialised in the 800 metres. He competed in the 800m and 4 x 400 metres relay at the 1988 Summer Olympics.
