= 1989 South American Championships in Athletics – Results =

These are the results of the 1989 South American Championships in Athletics which took place at the Estadio Alfonso Galvis Duque in Medellín, Colombia, between 5 and 8 August.

== Men's results ==
=== 100 metres ===
Heats – 5 August
Wind:
Heat 1: +1.1 m/s, Heat 2: +1.1 m/s

Rank	Heat	Name	Nationality	Time	Notes
1	1	Arnaldo da Silva	Brazil	10.3	Q
2	1	John Mena	Colombia	10.4	Q
3	1	Florencio Aguilar	Panama	10.4	Q
4	1	Edgar Chourio	Venezuela	10.5	q
5	1	Fernando Espinosa	Ecuador	10.6	
6	1	Hernán Hevia	Chile	10.8	
1	2	Antônio dos Santos Filho	Brazil	10.3	Q
2	2	Carlos Bernardo Moreno	Chile	10.5	Q
3	2	Reinaldo Santana	Venezuela	10.5	Q
4	2	Robinson Urrutia	Colombia	10.6	q
5	2	Jorge Castellón	Bolivia	10.6	
6	2	Danilo Almeida	Ecuador	10.7	

Final – 6 August

Wind: 0.0 m/s

Rank	Name	Nationality	Time	Notes
1st place, gold medalist(s)	John Mena	Colombia	10.4	
2nd place, silver medalist(s)	Florencio Aguilar	Panama	10.4	
3rd place, bronze medalist(s)	Antônio dos Santos Filho	Brazil	10.5	
4	Edgar Chourio	Venezuela	10.5	
5	Reinaldo Santana	Venezuela	10.5	
6	Robinson Urrutia	Colombia	10.6	
7	Carlos Bernardo Moreno	Chile	10.6	
	Arnaldo da Silva	Brazil	DQ	

=== 200 metres ===
Heats – 7 August
Wind:
Heat 1: +1.6 m/s, Heat 2: +1.6 m/s

Rank	Heat	Name	Nationality	Time	Notes
1	2	Sérgio Menezes	Brazil	20.79	Q
2	1	Robson da Silva	Brazil	20.99	Q
3	1	Mervin Solarte	Venezuela	21.24	Q
4	2	Jesús Malavé	Venezuela	21.26	Q
5	1	John Mena	Colombia	21.41	Q
6	1	Danilo Almeida	Ecuador	21.60	q
7	2	Fernando Espinosa	Ecuador	21.63	Q
8	2	Carlos Bernardo Moreno	Chile	21.66	q
9	1	Jorge Castellón	Bolivia	21.79	
10	1	Alejandro Krauss	Chile	22.13	

Final – 8 August

Wind: ? m/s

Rank	Name	Nationality	Time	Notes
1st place, gold medalist(s)	Robson da Silva	Brazil	20.44	
2nd place, silver medalist(s)	Sérgio Menezes	Brazil	20.88	
3rd place, bronze medalist(s)	Jesús Malavé	Venezuela	21.12	
4	Mervin Solarte	Venezuela	21.62	
5	Carlos Bernardo Moreno	Chile	21.74	
6	Danilo Almeida	Ecuador	21.81	
7	Fernando Espinosa	Ecuador	21.93	
	John Mena	Colombia	DQ	

=== 400 metres ===
Heats – 5 August

Rank	Heat	Name	Nationality	Time	Notes
1	1	Wilson Cañizales	Colombia	46.0	Q
2	1	Sérgio Menezes	Brazil	46.1	Q
3	1	Carlos Morales	Chile	46.6	Q
4	1	Jesús Malavé	Venezuela	46.7	q
5	1	Jaime Camargo	Panama	48.5	
6	1	Aurelio Mancheno	Ecuador	48.7	
1	2	Roberto Carlos Bortolotto	Brazil	46.7	Q
2	2	Henry Aguiar	Venezuela	46.9	Q
3	2	Héctor Daley	Panama	47.5	Q
4	2	Alejandro Krauss	Chile	47.6	q
5	2	Nicolás Valencia	Colombia	47.7	
6	2	Geovanny Vascones	Ecuador	48.7	

Final – 7 August

Rank	Name	Nationality	Time	Notes
1st place, gold medalist(s)	Sérgio Menezes	Brazil	45.88	
2nd place, silver medalist(s)	Wilson Cañizales	Colombia	45.91	
3rd place, bronze medalist(s)	Roberto Carlos Bortolotto	Brazil	46.38	
4	Jesús Malavé	Venezuela	46.40	
5	Carlos Morales	Chile	46.68	
6	Henry Aguiar	Venezuela	47.34	
7	Héctor Daley	Panama	47.47	
8	Alejandro Krauss	Chile	49.44	

=== 800 metres ===
8 August

Rank	Name	Nationality	Time	Notes
1st place, gold medalist(s)	Pablo Squella	Chile	1:49.19	
2nd place, silver medalist(s)	Geraldo de Assis	Brazil	1:49.29	
3rd place, bronze medalist(s)	Edgar de Oliveira	Brazil	1:49.51	
4	Juan Navarro	Venezuela	1:50.83	
5	Diego Córdoba	Colombia	1:51.07	
6	Hugo Endara	Ecuador	1:52.99	
7	Charles Boddington	Venezuela	1:53.65	

=== 1500 metres ===
6 August

Rank	Name	Nationality	Time	Notes
1st place, gold medalist(s)	Edgar de Oliveira	Brazil	3:47.7	
2nd place, silver medalist(s)	José López	Venezuela	3:47.9	
3rd place, bronze medalist(s)	José Abel Segura	Colombia	3:48.9	
4	Omar Aguilar	Chile	3:52.3	
5	Ricardo Vera	Uruguay	3:53.3	
6	Hugo Endara	Ecuador	3:53.9	
7	Rudimir Ojeda	Chile	3:54.5	
8	Diego Córdoba	Colombia	3:57.1	
9	Clodoaldo do Carmo	Brazil	3:57.5	
10	Dagoberto Yumán	Panama	4:09.2	
11	Juan Navarro	Venezuela	4:16.2	

=== 5000 metres ===
7 August

Rank	Name	Nationality	Time	Notes
1st place, gold medalist(s)	Geraldo Francisco de Assis	Brazil	14:09.60	
2nd place, silver medalist(s)	Silvio Salazar	Colombia	14:10.58	
3rd place, bronze medalist(s)	Silvio Guerra	Ecuador	14:11.20	
4	José Castillo	Peru	14:11.94	
5	Eduardo Navas	Venezuela	14:18.50	
6	Omar Aguilar	Chile	14:24.86	
7	Herder Vásquez	Colombia	14:37.13	
8	Artur Castro	Brazil	14:37.19	
9	Roberto Punina	Ecuador	14:38.57	
10	Óscar González	Venezuela	15:27.64	
11	Agustín Morán	Panama	15:37.20	
12	Concepción González	Panama	15:53.22	

=== 10,000 metres ===
5 August

Rank	Name	Nationality	Time	Notes
1st place, gold medalist(s)	Rolando Vera	Ecuador	29:28.1	
2nd place, silver medalist(s)	Geraldo Francisco de Assis	Brazil	29:55.5	
3rd place, bronze medalist(s)	Silvio Salazar	Colombia	30:14.3	
4	Artur Castro	Brazil	30:55.5	
5	Óscar González	Venezuela	31:09.2	
6	Néstor Jami	Ecuador	31:14.4	
7	Raúl Miranda	Panama	32:20.5	
8	Agustín Morán	Panama	32:35.6	

=== Marathon ===
7 August

Rank	Name	Nationality	Time	Notes
1st place, gold medalist(s)	Gustavo Paredes	Ecuador	2:23:42	
2nd place, silver medalist(s)	Wilson Pérez	Ecuador	2:23:47	
3rd place, bronze medalist(s)	Fernando Guio	Colombia	2:39:44	

=== 110 metres hurdles ===
6 August
Wind: +0.1 m/s

Rank	Name	Nationality	Time	Notes
1st place, gold medalist(s)	Pedro Chiamulera	Brazil	14.1	
2nd place, silver medalist(s)	Eliexer Pulgar	Venezuela	14.1	
3rd place, bronze medalist(s)	Elvis Cedeño	Venezuela	14.1	
4	Joilto Bonfim	Brazil	14.1	
5	José Humberto Rivas	Colombia	14.6	
	Miguel Saldarriaga	Colombia	DNF	

=== 400 metres hurdles ===
8 August

Rank	Name	Nationality	Time	Notes
1st place, gold medalist(s)	Pedro Chiamulera	Brazil	50.12	
2nd place, silver medalist(s)	Antônio Dias Ferreira	Brazil	51.26	
3rd place, bronze medalist(s)	Antonio Smith	Venezuela	51.32	
4	Wilfredo Ferrer	Venezuela	52.77	
5	Leonel Pedroza	Colombia	52.87	
6	Arnold Chará	Colombia	53.82	
7	Juan Phillips	Panama	53.99	
8	Teófilo Caicedo	Ecuador	55.44	

=== 3000 metres steeplechase ===
8 August

Rank	Name	Nationality	Time	Notes
1st place, gold medalist(s)	Adauto Domingues	Brazil	8:49.2	
2nd place, silver medalist(s)	Carlos Ravani	Brazil	8:53.9	
3rd place, bronze medalist(s)	Ricardo Vera	Uruguay	8:57.5	
4	José Castillo	Peru	9:00.2	
5	José Martínez	Venezuela	9:07.4	
6	Carlos Ospina	Colombia	9:19.5	
7	Amado Rivas	Venezuela	9:20.7	
8	Rudimir Ojeda	Chile	9:29.4	
9	Roberto Punina	Ecuador	9:32.7	
10	Dagoberto Yumán	Panama	10:08.2	

=== 4 × 100 metres relay ===
8 August

Rank	Nation	Competitors	Time	Notes
1st place, gold medalist(s)	Brazil	Fernando Botasso, Carlos de Oliveira, Antônio dos Santos Filho, Arnaldo da Silva	39.84	
2nd place, silver medalist(s)	Colombia	Robinson Urrutia, Fernando Arroyo, Wilson Cañizales, John Mena	39.87	
3rd place, bronze medalist(s)	Venezuela	Reinaldo Santana, Mervin Solarte, Ángel Tovar, Edgar Chourio	40.81	
4	Ecuador	Danilo Almeida, Geovanny Vascones, Aurelio Mancheno, Fernando Espinosa	40.99	
5	Chile	Alejandro Krauss, Carlos Bernardo Moreno, Carlos Morales, Hernán Hevia	41.66	

=== 4 × 400 metres relay ===
7 August

Rank	Nation	Competitors	Time	Notes
1st place, gold medalist(s)	Venezuela	Rafael Díaz, Wilfredo Ferrer, Henry Aguiar, Jesús Malavé	3:05.76	CR
2nd place, silver medalist(s)	Brazil	Antônio Ferreira, Sidnei de Souza, Pedro Chiamulera, Roberto Bortolotto	3:06.33	
3rd place, bronze medalist(s)	Chile	Hernán Hevia, Alejandro Krauss, Pablo Squella, Carlos Morales	3:06.34	NR
4	Colombia	Leonel Pedroza, Martínez, Nicolás Valencia, Wilson Cañizales	3:09.78	
5	Ecuador	Danilo Almeida, Geovanny Vascones, Aurelio Mancheno, Fernando Espinosa	3:12.21	

=== 20 kilometres walk ===
7 August

Rank	Name	Nationality	Time	Notes
1st place, gold medalist(s)	Sérgio Galdino	Brazil	1:24:51	
2nd place, silver medalist(s)	Héctor Moreno	Colombia	1:24:56	
3rd place, bronze medalist(s)	Querubín Moreno	Colombia	1:28:32	
4	Cláudio Bertolino	Brazil	1:31:50	
5	Carlos Ramones	Venezuela	1:32:34	
6	Henry Goitia	Venezuela	1:33:54	
7	Juan Iván Rojas	Ecuador	1:36:29	
8	Juan Canevaro	Chile	1:42:04	
9	Mario Rodríguez	Panama	1:42:55	
10	Leonel Ramos	Panama	1:47:08	

=== High jump ===
5 August

Rank	Name	Nationality	Result	Notes
1st place, gold medalist(s)	Milton Francisco	Brazil	2.15	
2nd place, silver medalist(s)	Santiago Lozada	Peru	2.09	
3rd place, bronze medalist(s)	José Luís Mendes	Brazil	2.03	
4	Jorge Quiñaliza	Ecuador	1.90	
5	Pedro Aguirre	Panama	1.85	
6	Roberto Bratwaite	Panama	1.80	

=== Pole vault ===
7 August

Rank	Name	Nationality	Result	Notes
1st place, gold medalist(s)	Renato Bortolocci	Brazil	5.10	
2nd place, silver medalist(s)	Miguel Saldarriaga	Colombia	5.10	
3rd place, bronze medalist(s)	Elson de Souza	Brazil	4.90	
4	Konstantín Zagustín	Venezuela	4.80	
5	Oscar Veit	Argentina	4.70	
6	Cristián Aspillaga	Chile	4.60	

=== Long jump ===
6 August

Rank	Name	Nationality	Result	Notes
1st place, gold medalist(s)	Luis Lourduy	Colombia	7.77	
2nd place, silver medalist(s)	Ángel Tovar	Venezuela	7.74	
3rd place, bronze medalist(s)	Olivier Cadier	Brazil	7.68	
4	Gilson Vaqueiro	Brazil	7.19	
5	José Quiñaliza	Ecuador	6.77	
6	Jimmy Ávila	Panama	6.61	

=== Triple jump ===
8 August

Rank	Name	Nationality	Result	Notes
1st place, gold medalist(s)	Sergio Saavedra	Venezuela	16.86	NR
2nd place, silver medalist(s)	Abcélvio Rodrigues	Brazil	16.48	
3rd place, bronze medalist(s)	Jorge da Silva	Brazil	16.38	
4	José Quiñaliza	Ecuador	16.35	
5	Roberto Audain	Venezuela	16.19	
6	Gilmar Mayo	Colombia	15.94	

=== Shot put ===
6 August

Rank	Name	Nationality	Result	Notes
1st place, gold medalist(s)	Gert Weil	Chile	19.98	
2nd place, silver medalist(s)	Adilson Oliveira	Brazil	17.49	
3rd place, bronze medalist(s)	João Joaquim dos Santos	Brazil	16.25	
4	Andrés Charadía	Argentina	15.63	
5	Celso Aragón	Colombia	15.04	
6	Wilfredo Jaime	Venezuela	14.41	
7	Jorge Coronel	Ecuador	12.75	

=== Discus throw ===
5 August

Rank	Name	Nationality	Result	Notes
1st place, gold medalist(s)	João Joaquim dos Santos	Brazil	58.00	CR
2nd place, silver medalist(s)	José Carlos Jacques	Brazil	52.88	
3rd place, bronze medalist(s)	Gert Weil	Chile	52.36	
4	Luis Palacios	Venezuela	49.20	
5	Marcelo Pugliese	Argentina	48.46	
6	Wilfredo Jaime	Venezuela	47.40	
7	Andrés Charadía	Argentina	45.80	
8	Jorge Coronel	Ecuador	39.28	

=== Hammer throw ===
8 August

Rank	Name	Nationality	Result	Notes
1st place, gold medalist(s)	Marcelo Pugliese	Argentina	67.00	CR
2nd place, silver medalist(s)	Andrés Charadía	Argentina	65.56	
3rd place, bronze medalist(s)	Pedro Rivail Atílio	Brazil	63.34	
4	Alexandre Mantovani	Brazil	58.02	
5	Roberto Lozano	Colombia	56.64	
6	Edmundo Castillo	Venezuela	55.40	
7	Carlos Yépez	Venezuela	54.90	

=== Javelin throw ===
7 August

Rank	Name	Nationality	Result	Notes
1st place, gold medalist(s)	Luis Lucumí	Colombia	77.80	AR
2nd place, silver medalist(s)	Antar Martínez	Colombia	67.20	
3rd place, bronze medalist(s)	Luis Carrasco	Venezuela	65.38	
4	Nivaldo Beje Filho	Brazil	63.48	
5	Rodrigo Zelaya	Chile	62.66	
6	Orion Pedroso	Brazil	60.74	
7	Jorge Coronel	Ecuador	54.60	
8	Rodolfo Méndez	Panama	52.46	

=== Decathlon ===
6–7 August

The highest mark recorded in each event is highlighted in yellow

Rank	Athlete	Nationality	100m	LJ	SP	HJ	400m	110m H	DT	PV	JT	1500m	Points	Notes
1st place, gold medalist(s)	Martín Badano	Argentina	11.4	7.02	13.56	2.10	52.4	15.1	38.40	4.60	56.72	4:50.0	7378	
2nd place, silver medalist(s)	José Ricardo Nunes	Brazil	10.8	7.12	13.30	1.98	49.1	14.7	34.26	3.80	34.70	4:39.6	7324	
3rd place, bronze medalist(s)	Oscar Veit	Argentina	11.1	7.15	12.81	1.86	52.3	15.1	38.44	5.10	54.42	5:47.2	7033	
4	José Velázquez	Venezuela	11.2	6.91	13.78	1.80	54.2	14.7	43.74	4.30	56.80	5:37.4	6879	
5	Rubén Herrada	Venezuela	11.2	6.53	13.85	1.92	50.4	15.8	36.38	3.90	48.92	4:49.2	6814	
6	Pedro da Silva Filho	Brazil	11.2	7.16	14.49	1.92	56.4	14.7	41.56	NM	52.42	4:22.0	6619	
7	Pedro Aguirre	Panama	11.5	5.31	8.76	1.74	57.6	17.8	22.88	2.80	NM	5:34.6	4156	

== Women's results ==
=== 100 metres ===
Heats – 5 August
Wind:
Heat 1: ? m/s, Heat 2: +0.5 m/s

Rank	Heat	Name	Nationality	Time	Notes
1	1	Amparo Caicedo	Colombia	11.3	Q
2	1	Olga Conte	Argentina	11.9	Q
3	1	Claudia Acerenza	Uruguay	11.9	Q
4	1	Rosmeire Lopes	Brazil	11.9	q
5	1	Florinda Méndez	Venezuela	12.1	q
6	1	Narcisa Gaona	Ecuador	12.4	
1	2	Ximena Restrepo	Colombia	11.4	Q
2	2	Cleide Amaral	Brazil	11.7	Q
3	2	Margarita Martirena	Uruguay	12.1	Q
4	2	Soledad Bacarezza	Chile	12.2	
5	2	Marta Phillips	Panama	12.7	

Final – 6 August

Wind: 0.0 m/s

Rank	Name	Nationality	Time	Notes
1st place, gold medalist(s)	Amparo Caicedo	Colombia	11.3	
2nd place, silver medalist(s)	Ximena Restrepo	Colombia	11.4	
3rd place, bronze medalist(s)	Cleide Amaral	Brazil	11.5	
4	Olga Conte	Argentina	11.6	
5	Margarita Martirena	Uruguay	11.8	
6	Rosmeire Lopes	Brazil	11.8	
7	Claudia Acerenza	Uruguay	11.9	
8	Florinda Méndez	Venezuela	11.9	

=== 200 metres ===
Heats – 7 August
Wind:
Heat 1: +2.0 m/s, Heat 2: +1.6 m/s

Rank	Heat	Name	Nationality	Time	Notes
1	2	Jupira da Graça	Brazil	23.41	Q
2	1	Olga Conte	Argentina	23.45	Q
3	2	Amparo Caicedo	Colombia	23.57	Q
4	1	Claudete Alves Pina	Brazil	23.84	Q
5	2	Claudia Acerenza	Uruguay	24.05	Q
6	2	Ana María Comaschi	Argentina	24.14	q
7	1	Margarita Martirena	Uruguay	24.95	Q
8	2	Soledad Bacarezza	Chile	25.19	q
9	1	Narcisa Gaona	Ecuador	25.85	
10	1	Marta Phillips	Panama	26.78	

Final – 8 August

Wind: ? m/s

Rank	Name	Nationality	Time	Notes
1st place, gold medalist(s)	Olga Conte	Argentina	23.33	CR
2nd place, silver medalist(s)	Jupira da Graça	Brazil	23.44	
3rd place, bronze medalist(s)	Amparo Caicedo	Colombia	23.68	
4	Claudete Alves Pina	Brazil	24.01	
5	Claudia Acerenza	Uruguay	24.07	
6	Margarita Martirena	Uruguay	24.82	
	Ana María Comaschi	Argentina	DNS	
	Soledad Bacarezza	Chile	DNS	

=== 400 metres ===
Heats – 5 August

Rank	Heat	Name	Nationality	Time	Notes
1	1	Norfalia Carabalí	Colombia	52.4	Q
2	1	Olga Conte	Argentina	53.1	Q
3	1	Claudete Alves Pina	Brazil	53.7	Q
4	1	Liliana Chalá	Ecuador	53.9	q
5	1	Ismenia Guzmán	Chile	54.8	q
6	2	Claudia Riquelme	Chile	54.9	Q
7	2	Soledad Acerenza	Uruguay	55.4	Q
8	2	Rosa Segovia	Colombia	56.1	Q
9	2	Rosângela Oliveira	Brazil	56.3	
10	1	Yosira Sequera	Venezuela	57.2	
11	2	Ingrid Rosero	Ecuador	58.9	

Final – 7 August

Rank	Name	Nationality	Time	Notes
1st place, gold medalist(s)	Norfalia Carabalí	Colombia	52.10	CR
2nd place, silver medalist(s)	Olga Conte	Argentina	53.47	
3rd place, bronze medalist(s)	Claudete Alves Pina	Brazil	54.26	
4	Liliana Chalá	Ecuador	54.34	
5	Soledad Acerenza	Uruguay	55.38	
6	Ismenia Guzmán	Chile	55.53	
7	Claudia Riquelme	Chile	56.40	
8	Rosa Segovia	Colombia	57.94	

=== 800 metres ===
7 August

Rank	Name	Nationality	Time	Notes
1st place, gold medalist(s)	Maria Andrade	Brazil	2:08.79	
2nd place, silver medalist(s)	Amparo Alba	Colombia	2:08.83	
3rd place, bronze medalist(s)	Célia dos Santos	Brazil	2:08.99	
4	Rocío Estrada	Colombia	2:10.24	
5	Ismenia Guzmán	Chile	2:12.84	
6	Ingrid Rosero	Ecuador	2:18.76	
7	Milexa Figueroa	Venezuela	2:22.31	

=== 1500 metres ===
6 August

Rank	Name	Nationality	Time	Notes
1st place, gold medalist(s)	Rita de Jesus	Brazil	4:31.6	
2nd place, silver medalist(s)	Silvana Pereira	Brazil	4:32.1	
3rd place, bronze medalist(s)	Janeth Caizalitín	Ecuador	4:32.9	
4	Yolanda Quimbita	Ecuador	4:38.1	
5	Rocío Estrada	Colombia	4:44.2	
6	Amparo Alba	Colombia	4:47.5	
7	Mileika Arauz	Panama	5:05.4	

=== 3000 metres ===
7 August

Rank	Name	Nationality	Time	Notes
1st place, gold medalist(s)	Carmem de Oliveira	Brazil	9:22.58	CR
2nd place, silver medalist(s)	Janeth Caizalitín	Ecuador	9:36.43	
3rd place, bronze medalist(s)	Rita de Jesus	Brazil	9:36.95	
4	Yolanda Quimbita	Ecuador	9:43.97	
5	Marisol Cossio	Bolivia	10:28.49	
6	María Arias	Colombia	10:32.87	
7	Hilda Méndez	Panama	10:54.22	
8	Mileika Arauz	Panama	11:11.09	

=== 10,000 metres ===
5 August

Rank	Name	Nationality	Time	Notes
1st place, gold medalist(s)	Carmem de Oliveira	Brazil	35:08.5	
2nd place, silver medalist(s)	Sandra Ruales	Ecuador	35:55.2	
3rd place, bronze medalist(s)	Yolanda Quimbita	Ecuador	35:55.3	
4	Janeth Mayal	Brazil	36:4.7	
5	Marisol Cossio	Bolivia	38:10.8	
6	María Arias	Colombia	38:34.7	
7	Hilda Méndez	Panama	39:36.2	

=== 100 metres hurdles ===
Heats – 5 August
Wind:
Heat 1: +0.1 m/s, Heat 2: 0.0 m/s

Rank	Heat	Name	Nationality	Time	Notes
1	1	Juraciara da Silva	Brazil	13.6	Q
2	1	Ana María Comaschi	Argentina	14.0	Q
3	1	Marta Dinas	Colombia	14.3	Q
4	1	Inés Justet	Uruguay	15.0	q
5	1	María Paulina Caroca	Chile	15.0	q
1	2	Arlene Phillips	Venezuela	13.6	Q
2	2	Carmen Bezanilla	Chile	13.6	Q
2	2	Conceição Geremias	Brazil	14.4	Q

Final – 6 August

Wind: 0.0 m/s

Rank	Name	Nationality	Time	Notes
1st place, gold medalist(s)	Juraciara da Silva	Brazil	13.5	
2nd place, silver medalist(s)	Ana María Comaschi	Argentina	13.7	
3rd place, bronze medalist(s)	Arlene Phillips	Venezuela	13.8	
4	Carmen Bezanilla	Chile	13.9	
5	Conceição Geremias	Brazil	14.3	
6	Marta Dinas	Colombia	14.8	
7	Inés Justet	Uruguay	15.0	
8	María Paulina Caroca	Chile	15.6	

=== 400 metres hurdles ===
8 August

Rank	Name	Nationality	Time	Notes
1st place, gold medalist(s)	Liliana Chalá	Ecuador	57.68	CR
2nd place, silver medalist(s)	Maribelcy Peña	Colombia	1:00.30	
3rd place, bronze medalist(s)	Joana Caetano	Brazil	1:00.69	
4	Maria do Carmo Fialho	Brazil	1:00.97	
5	Claudia Riquelme	Chile	1:01.52	
6	Inés Justet	Uruguay	1:01.59	
7	Arlene Phillips	Venezuela	1:01.79	
8	María Paulina Caroca	Chile	1:02.72	

=== 4 × 100 metres relay ===
8 August

Rank	Nation	Competitors	Time	Notes
1st place, gold medalist(s)	Brazil	Claudileia dos Santos, Jupira da Graça, Rosmeire Lopes, Cleide Amaral	44.69	AR
2nd place, silver medalist(s)	Colombia	Rosa Segovia, Alejandra Quiñones, Amparo Caicedo, Norfalia Carabalí	45.26	
3rd place, bronze medalist(s)	Uruguay	Margarita Martirena, Inés Justet, Soledad Acerenza, Claudia Acerenza	46.61	
4	Chile	Ismenia Guzmán, Soleda Bacarezza, Carmen Bezanilla, Claudia Riquelme	47.20	
5	Venezuela	Arlene Phillips, Milexa Figueroa, Sorelis Bohorquez, Florinda Mèndez	48.70	
6	Ecuador	Narcisa Gaona, Ingrid Rosero, Sandra Barragán, Liliana Chalá	48.90	

=== 4 × 400 metres relay ===
7 August

Rank	Nation	Competitors	Time	Notes
1st place, gold medalist(s)	Colombia	Rosa Segovia, Alejandra Quiñones, Maribelcy Peña, Norfalia Carabalí	3:37.0	CR
2nd place, silver medalist(s)	Brazil	Rosângela Oliveira, Jupira da Graça, Maria do Carmo Fialho, Claudete Alves Pina	3:37.7	
3rd place, bronze medalist(s)	Uruguay	Inés Justet, Margarita Martirena, Soledad Acerenza, Claudia Acerenza	3:44.0	
4	Chile	María Paulina Caroca, Ismenia Guzmán, Carmen Bezanilla, Claudia Riquelme	3:46.0	
5	Ecuador	Sandra Barragán, Ingrid Rosero, Narcisa Gaona, Liliana Chalá	3:54.6	
6	Venezuela	Yosira Sequera, Florinda Méndez, Milexa Figueroa, Arlene Phillips	3:58.9	

=== 10,000 metres walk ===
6 August

Rank	Name	Nationality	Time	Notes
1st place, gold medalist(s)	Miriam Ramón	Ecuador	50:30.3	CR
2nd place, silver medalist(s)	Luisa Nivicela	Ecuador	50:30.3	
3rd place, bronze medalist(s)	Liliana Bermeo	Colombia	51:02.4	
4	Gloria Moreno	Colombia	52:03.4	
5	Ivana Hehn	Brazil	55:36.2	

=== High jump ===
7 August

Rank	Name	Nationality	Result	Notes
1st place, gold medalist(s)	Orlane dos Santos	Brazil	1.85	
2nd place, silver medalist(s)	Mónica Lunkmoss	Brazil	1.79	
3rd place, bronze medalist(s)	Janeth Lagoyette	Colombia	1.70	
4	Leonor Carter	Chile	1.70	
5	Claudia Brien	Chile	1.65	
5	Araceli Jaén	Panama	1.50	

=== Long jump ===
8 August

Rank	Name	Nationality	Result	Notes
1st place, gold medalist(s)	Rita Slompo	Brazil	6.22	
2nd place, silver medalist(s)	Maria Aparecida de Jesus	Brazil	6.05	
3rd place, bronze medalist(s)	Ana María Comaschi	Argentina	5.96	
4	Milly Figueroa	Colombia	5.84	
5	Zorobabelia Córdoba	Colombia	5.75	
6	Sorelis Bohorquez	Venezuela	5.75	
7	Claudia Brien	Chile	5.39	
8	Leonor Carter	Chile	5.12	

=== Shot put ===
5 August

Rank	Name	Nationality	Result	Notes
1st place, gold medalist(s)	Marinalva dos Santos	Brazil	15.16	CR
2nd place, silver medalist(s)	Alexandra Amaro	Brazil	14.95	
3rd place, bronze medalist(s)	Virginia Salomón	Venezuela	14.20	
4	Berta Gómez	Colombia	13.76	
5	Rosa Peña	Peru	13.69	
6	Carmen Chalá	Ecuador	13.41	
7	Lila Morales	Venezuela	13.06	
8	Claudia Brien	Chile	12.30	
9	Silka del Rosario	Panama	9.87	

=== Discus throw ===
6 August

Rank	Name	Nationality	Result	Notes
1st place, gold medalist(s)	Rosana Piovesan	Brazil	49.36	
2nd place, silver medalist(s)	Berta Gómez	Colombia	47.54	
3rd place, bronze medalist(s)	Amelia Moreira	Brazil	44.54	
4	Carmen Chalá	Ecuador	43.02	
5	Yunaira Piña	Venezuela	42.26	
6	Claudia Larenas	Chile	41.64	
7	Lila Morales	Venezuela	40.22	
8	Silka del Rosario	Panama	37.94	

=== Javelin throw ===
8 August

Rank	Name	Nationality	Result	Notes
1st place, gold medalist(s)	Mônica Rocha	Brazil	54.94	
2nd place, silver medalist(s)	Marietta Riera	Venezuela	54.70	
3rd place, bronze medalist(s)	Sueli dos Santos	Brazil	52.78	
4	Mariela Riera	Venezuela	51.36	
5	Berta Gómez	Colombia	50.76	
6	Carolina Weil	Chile	48.78	
7	Verónica Prieto	Colombia	45.30	
8	Carmen Chalá	Ecuador	30.04	

=== Heptathlon ===
5–6 August

The highest mark recorded in each event is highlighted in yellow

Rank	Athlete	Nationality	100m H	HJ	SP	200m	LJ	JT	800m	Points	Notes
1st place, gold medalist(s)	Conceição Geremias	Brazil	14.0	1.72	13.56	25.0	5.75	39.00	2:29.6	5574	
2nd place, silver medalist(s)	Zorobabelia Córdoba	Colombia	14.4	1.57	12.62	24.9	5.64	49.44	2:31.1	5436	
3rd place, bronze medalist(s)	Joelma Oliveira	Brazil	14.6	1.78	11.68	25.1	5.26	38.08	2:29.6	5271	
4	Claudia Brien	Chile	15.3	1.72	13.22	28.1	5.34	35.08	DNF	4224	
	Ana María Comaschi	Argentina	14.1	1.63	13.16	DQ	DNS	–	–	DNF	
