= 1991 South American Championships in Athletics – Results =

These are the results of the 1991 South American Championships in Athletics which took place at the Vila Olímpica de Manaus in Manaus, Brazil, on 28, 29 and 30 June.

== Men's results ==
=== 100 metres ===
Heats – 28 June
Wind:
Heat 1: -0.7 m/s, Heat 2: -0.7 m/s

Rank	Heat	Name	Nationality	Time	Notes
1	1	Arnaldo da Silva	Brazil	10.49	Q
2	1	Carlos Bernardo Moreno	Chile	10.60	Q
3	2	Robson da Silva	Brazil	10.61	Q
4	2	Edgar Chourio	Venezuela	10.69	Q
5	1	Robinson Urrutia	Colombia	10.70	Q
6	2	José María Beduino	Argentina	10.79	Q
7	1	Claudio Molocznik	Argentina	10.86	q
8	2	Wenceslao Ferrín	Colombia	10.89	q
9	1	Miguel Bernal	Peru	10.93	
10	2	Roberto Marshall	Chile	10.97	
11	2	Óscar Fernández	Peru	11.03	
12	1	Cristóbal Caguao	Venezuela	11.10	
13	2	Marco Antonio Ortiz	Bolivia	11.12	
14	1	Guillermo Saucedo	Bolivia	11.40	
15	1	Steven Stander	Ecuador	11.50	
15	2	Patricio Corral	Ecuador	11.50	

Final – 28 June

Wind: +0.7 m/s

Rank	Name	Nationality	Time	Notes
1st place, gold medalist(s)	Robson da Silva	Brazil	10.18	
2nd place, silver medalist(s)	Arnaldo da Silva	Brazil	10.39	
3rd place, bronze medalist(s)	Carlos Bernardo Moreno	Chile	10.44	
4	Edgar Chourio	Venezuela	10.56	
5	Robinson Urrutia	Colombia	10.66	
6	José María Beduino	Argentina	10.72	
7	Wenceslao Ferrín	Colombia	10.73	
8	Claudio Molocznik	Argentina	10.76	

=== 200 metres ===
Heats – 29 June
Wind:
Heat 1: +0.2 m/s, Heat 2: +0.7 m/s

Rank	Heat	Name	Nationality	Time	Notes
1	2	Robson da Silva	Brazil	20.66	Q
2	1	Marcelo Brivilatti da Silva	Brazil	20.96	Q
3	2	Jesús Malavé	Venezuela	21.22	Q
4	1	Carlos Bernardo Moreno	Chile	21.33	Q
5	1	José María Beduino	Argentina	21.33	Q
6	1	Jorge Cañizales	Venezuela	21.44	q
7	2	Carlos Morales	Chile	21.45	Q
8	1	Manuel Oliveira	Peru	21.99	q
9	2	Marco Antonio Ortiz	Bolivia	22.40	
10	2	Miguel Bernal	Peru	22.74	
11	2	Steven Stander	Ecuador	23.26	
12	1	Guillermo Saucedo	Bolivia	23.61	

Final – 29 June

Wind: +0.5 m/s

Rank	Name	Nationality	Time	Notes
1st place, gold medalist(s)	Robson da Silva	Brazil	20.79	
2nd place, silver medalist(s)	Marcelo Brivilatti da Silva	Brazil	20.94	
3rd place, bronze medalist(s)	Jesús Malavé	Venezuela	21.18	
4	Carlos Bernardo Moreno	Chile	21.19	
5	José María Beduino	Argentina	21.22	PB
6	Carlos Morales	Chile	21.38	
7	Jorge Cañizales	Venezuela	21.44	
8	Manuel Oliveira	Peru	21.99	

=== 400 metres ===
Heats – 28 June

Rank	Heat	Name	Nationality	Time	Notes
1	1	Roberto Bortolotto	Brazil	47.09	Q
2	2	Jorge Costa	Brazil	47.66	Q
3	1	Henry Aguiar	Venezuela	47.87	Q
4	2	Carlos Morales	Chile	48.11	Q
5	1	Claudio Arcas	Argentina	48.18	Q
6	1	Sebastián Keitel	Chile	48.36	q
6	2	Guillermo Cacián	Argentina	48.36	Q
8	1	Moisés del Castillo	Peru	48.40	q
9	2	José Zambrano	Venezuela	48.62	
10	2	Piero da Giau	Peru	48.87	

Final – 28 June

Rank	Name	Nationality	Time	Notes
1st place, gold medalist(s)	Carlos Morales	Chile	46.55	
2nd place, silver medalist(s)	Roberto Bortolotto	Brazil	46.90	
3rd place, bronze medalist(s)	Henry Aguiar	Venezuela	47.02	
4	Jorge Costa	Brazil	47.09	
5	Claudio Arcas	Argentina	47.92	
6	Sebastián Keitel	Chile	48.37	
7	Moisés del Castillo	Peru	48.67	
8	Guillermo Cacián	Argentina	49.16	

=== 800 metres ===
Heats – 28 June

Rank	Heat	Name	Nationality	Time	Notes
1	2	Flávio Godoy	Brazil	1:49.66	Q
2	2	Pablo Squella	Chile	1:49.67	Q
3	1	Luiz José Gonçalves	Brazil	1:50.23	Q
4	1	Edgardo Graglia	Argentina	1:50.56	Q
5	1	Juan Navarro	Venezuela	1:50.80	Q
6	2	Alejandro Torres	Argentina	1:51.49	Q
7	2	Omar Best	Venezuela	1:51.88	q
8	2	Javier Bermúdez	Colombia	1:51.91	q
9	1	Manuel Balmaceda	Chile	1:52.05	
10	1	Efren Ycaza	Ecuador	1:54.08	
11	2	Daniel Loayza	Peru	1:54.99	
12	1	Luis Aspedilla	Panama	1:55.82	
13	1	Italo Mejía	Peru	1:56.67	
14	2	Manuel Bravo	Ecuador	1:57.17	

Final – 29 June

Rank	Name	Nationality	Time	Notes
1st place, gold medalist(s)	Flávio Godoy	Brazil	1:47.94	
2nd place, silver medalist(s)	Luiz José Gonçalves	Brazil	1:48.16	
3rd place, bronze medalist(s)	Pablo Squella	Chile	1:48.21	
4	Juan Navarro	Venezuela	1:49.61	
5	Edgardo Graglia	Argentina	1:51.03	
6	Javier Bermúdez	Colombia	1:51.93	
7	Omar Best	Venezuela	1:51.95	
8	Alejandro Torres	Argentina	1:52.04	

=== 1500 metres ===
30 June

Rank	Name	Nationality	Time	Notes
1st place, gold medalist(s)	Edgar de Oliveira	Brazil	3:42.41	
2nd place, silver medalist(s)	Luiz José Gonçalves	Brazil	3:42.48	
3rd place, bronze medalist(s)	Carlos Naput	Argentina	3:50.09	
4	Eduardo Navas	Venezuela	3:50.51	
5	Alejandro Torres	Argentina	3:52.56	
6	Daniel Loayza	Peru	3:57.87	
7	Jaime Valenzuela	Chile	4:08.25	
8	Carlos Collahuaso	Ecuador	4:11.71	
	Eduardo Carrasco	Chile	DNF	
	Juan Navarro	Venezuela	DNF	

=== 5000 metres ===
28 June

Rank	Name	Nationality	Time	Notes
1st place, gold medalist(s)	Valdenor dos Santos	Brazil	14:09.03	
2nd place, silver medalist(s)	Otoniel dos Santos	Brazil	14:13.35	
3rd place, bronze medalist(s)	Eduardo Navas	Venezuela	14:16.06	
4	Eduardo Carrasco	Chile	14:25.61	
5	Néstor Quinapanta	Ecuador	14:29.93	
6	Oscar Amaya	Argentina	14:35.53	
7	Edy Punina	Ecuador	14:39.62	
8	Luis Nempo	Chile	14:44.54	
9	Dagoberto Yuman	Panama	14:50.12	
10	Policarpio Calizaya	Bolivia	14:53.55	
11	Félix Flores	Peru	16:11.57	

=== 10,000 metres ===
29 June

Rank	Name	Nationality	Time	Notes
1st place, gold medalist(s)	Valdenor dos Santos	Brazil	29:25.2	
2nd place, silver medalist(s)	José Castillo	Peru	29:37.4	
3rd place, bronze medalist(s)	Edy Punina	Ecuador	30:00.4	
4	Waldemar Cotelo	Uruguay	30:23.0	
5	Otoniel dos Santos	Brazil	30:40.3	
6	Nelson Zamora	Uruguay	30:45.9	
7	Antonio Vásquez	Venezuela	30:54.6	
8	Policarpio Calizaya	Bolivia	31:04.7	
9	José Carmona	Venezuela	31:14.0	
10	Félix Flores	Peru	33:47.5	

=== Marathon ===
30 June

Rank	Name	Nationality	Time	Notes
1st place, gold medalist(s)	Joseildo da Silva	Brazil	2:33:22	
2nd place, silver medalist(s)	Luis Nempo	Chile	2:39:57	
3rd place, bronze medalist(s)	Doval da Silva	Brazil	2:41:38	
4	Adolfo López	Peru	2:41:40	
5	Iván Acosta	Peru	2:48:54	

=== 110 metres hurdles ===
Heats – 29 June
Wind:
Heat 1: +0.2 m/s, Heat 2: +0.2 m/s

Rank	Heat	Name	Nationality	Time	Notes
1	2	Joilto Bonfim	Brazil	14.05	Q
2	1	Elvis Cedeño	Venezuela	14.39	Q
3	1	José Humberto Rivas	Colombia	14.40	Q
4	1	José Costa	Brazil	14.42	Q
5	1	Oscar Ratto	Argentina	14.63	q
6	2	Eliexer Pulgar	Venezuela	14.75	Q
7	2	Marco Mina	Peru	14.79	Q
8	2	Arturo Rodríguez	Chile	15.15	q
9	1	Javier del Río	Peru	15.45	
10	2	Omar Triviño	Ecuador	15.52	

Final – 30 June

Wind: -1.1 m/s

Rank	Name	Nationality	Time	Notes
1st place, gold medalist(s)	Joilto Bonfim	Brazil	14.11	
2nd place, silver medalist(s)	Elvis Cedeño	Venezuela	14.23	
3rd place, bronze medalist(s)	Eliexer Pulgar	Venezuela	14.38	
4	José Humberto Rivas	Colombia	14.40	
5	José Costa	Brazil	14.66	
6	Marco Mina	Peru	14.71	
7	Oscar Ratto	Argentina	14.95	
8	Arturo Rodríguez	Chile	15.89	

=== 400 metres hurdles ===
Heats – 28 June

Rank	Heat	Name	Nationality	Time	Notes
1	2	Eronilde de Araújo	Brazil	50.50	Q
2	2	Luis Bello	Venezuela	51.28	Q
3	1	Antonio Smith	Venezuela	51.40	Q
4	1	Llimy Rivas	Colombia	52.26	Q
5	1	José Carlos Lima	Brazil	52.40	Q
6	1	Mauro Mina	Peru	52.46	q
7	1	Miguel Pérez	Argentina	52.58	q
8	2	Leonel Pedroza	Colombia	53.63	Q
9	2	Jorge Lau	Peru	55.32	
10	2	Omar Triviño	Ecuador	57.14	

Final – 29 June

Rank	Name	Nationality	Time	Notes
1st place, gold medalist(s)	Eronilde de Araújo	Brazil	49.65	CR
2nd place, silver medalist(s)	Antonio Smith	Venezuela	50.14	
3rd place, bronze medalist(s)	Luis Bello	Venezuela	50.73	
4	Llimy Rivas	Colombia	51.49	
5	José Carlos Lima	Brazil	51.81	
6	Miguel Pérez	Argentina	52.26	
7	Mauro Mina	Peru	52.38	
8	Leonel Pedroza	Colombia	53.40	

=== 3000 metres steeplechase ===
29 June

Rank	Name	Nationality	Time	Notes
1st place, gold medalist(s)	Adauto Domingues	Brazil	8:36.21	CR
2nd place, silver medalist(s)	Wander Moura	Brazil	8:49.11	
3rd place, bronze medalist(s)	Oscar Amaya	Argentina	8:52.08	
4	Carlos Naput	Argentina	8:58.80	
5	Jaime Valenzuela	Chile	9:25.96	
6	Carlos Collahuaso	Ecuador	9:52.91	

=== 4 × 100 metres relay ===
29 June

Rank	Nation	Competitors	Time	Notes
1st place, gold medalist(s)	Brazil	Reginaldo Aguiar, Joilto Bonfim, Arnaldo da Silva, Robson da Silva	39.90	
2nd place, silver medalist(s)	Chile	Héctor Fernández, Roberto Marshall, Carlos Morales, Carlos Moreno	40.61	
3rd place, bronze medalist(s)	Argentina	Claudio Molocznik, Guillermo Cacián, José María Beduino, Claudio Arcas	41.22	
4	Venezuela	Cristóbal Caguao, Jorge Cañizales, Edgar Chourio, Jesús Malavé	42.05	
	Colombia		DNF	
	Peru		DNF	

=== 4 × 400 metres relay ===
30 June

Rank	Nation	Competitors	Time	Notes
1st place, gold medalist(s)	Brazil	Roberto Bortolotto, Jorge Costa, Geraldo Maranhão Jr., Ediélson Tenório	3:05.60	CR
2nd place, silver medalist(s)	Venezuela	Antonio Smith, Henry Aguiar, José Moisés Zambrano, Luis Bello	3:08.39	
3rd place, bronze medalist(s)	Argentina	Claudio Arcas, José María Beduino, Guillermo Cacián, Claudio Molocznik	3:11.10	
4	Colombia	Leonel Pedroza, Wenceslao Ferrín, Javier Bermúdez, Llimy Rivas	3:13.72	
5	Chile	Sebastián Keitel, Pablo Squella, Manuel José Balmaceda, Carlos Morales	3:14.41	
6	Peru	Piero da Giau, Andrade, Jorge Lau, Moisés del Castillo	3:15.02	
	Ecuador		DQ	

=== 20 kilometres walk ===
28 June

Rank	Name	Nationality	Time	Notes
1st place, gold medalist(s)	Sérgio Galdino	Brazil	1:26:25.3	
2nd place, silver medalist(s)	Querubín Moreno	Colombia	1:28:55.3	
3rd place, bronze medalist(s)	Orlando Díaz	Colombia	1:30:21.6	
4	Carlos Ramones	Venezuela	1:32:24.8	
5	Jorge Loréfice	Argentina	1:38:58.0	
6	Sergio Quispe	Peru	1:57:43.0	
	Carlos Bizet	Peru	DQ	
	Marcelo Palma	Brazil	DQ	
	Mauricio Cárdenas	Ecuador	DQ	
	Jefferson Pérez	Ecuador	DQ	

=== High jump ===
30 June

Rank	Name	Nationality	Result	Notes
1st place, gold medalist(s)	Gilmar Mayo	Colombia	2.20	CR
2nd place, silver medalist(s)	Fernando Moreno	Argentina	2.17	
3rd place, bronze medalist(s)	Jorge Archanjo	Brazil	2.11	
4	Hugo Muñoz	Peru	2.11	
5	Valery Abugattas	Peru	2.11	
6	Luciano Bacelli	Brazil	2.11	
7	Fernando Pastoriza	Argentina	2.05	
8	Cristian Kraemer	Chile	2.05	
9	Claudio Pinto	Bolivia	1.95	
10	Giovanny Gudiño	Ecuador	1.95	

=== Pole vault ===
29 June

Rank	Name	Nationality	Result	Notes
1st place, gold medalist(s)	Cristián Aspillaga	Chile	5.00	
2nd place, silver medalist(s)	Konstantín Zagustín	Venezuela	5.00	
3rd place, bronze medalist(s)	Tómas Riether	Chile	4.80	
4	Fernando Pastoriza	Argentina	4.60	
5	Marlon Borges	Brazil	4.60	
6	Igor Castillo	Peru	4.30	

=== Long jump ===
29 June

Rank	Name	Nationality	Result	Notes
1st place, gold medalist(s)	Paulo de Oliveira	Brazil	7.83	
2nd place, silver medalist(s)	Gelson Vaqueiro	Brazil	7.46	
3rd place, bronze medalist(s)	Jimmy Ávila	Panama	7.40	
4	Juan Carlos Moeckel	Chile	7.31	
5	Sergio Saavedra	Venezuela	7.20	
6	Rubén Herrada	Venezuela	6.76	
7	Luis Candia	Chile	6.68	
8	Santiago Lozada	Peru	6.26	
9	Patricio Corral	Ecuador	6.03	

=== Triple jump ===
28 June

Rank	Name	Nationality	Result	Notes
1st place, gold medalist(s)	Anísio Silva	Brazil	16.15	
2nd place, silver medalist(s)	Sergio Saavedra	Venezuela	15.98	
3rd place, bronze medalist(s)	Ednilson de Miranda	Brazil	15.74	
4	Freddy Nieves	Ecuador	14.70	
5	Luis Candia	Chile	14.70	

=== Shot put ===
29 June

Rank	Name	Nationality	Result	Notes
1st place, gold medalist(s)	Gert Weil	Chile	18.37	
2nd place, silver medalist(s)	Adilson Oliveira	Brazil	18.08	
3rd place, bronze medalist(s)	Yojer Medina	Venezuela	16.35	
4	Edson Miguel	Brazil	15.95	
5	Andrés Charadía	Argentina	15.14	
6	Marcelo Pugliese	Argentina	14.48	
7	Daniel Duharte	Peru	13.28	
8	Rubén Herrada	Venezuela	12.94	

=== Discus throw ===
29 June

Rank	Name	Nationality	Result	Notes
1st place, gold medalist(s)	João dos Santos	Brazil	58.08	CR
2nd place, silver medalist(s)	Marcelo Pugliese	Argentina	53.08	
3rd place, bronze medalist(s)	Jair Teotonio	Brazil	51.62	
4	Yojer Medina	Venezuela	48.72	
5	Andrés Charadía	Argentina	47.44	
6	José Andrés de Zaldívar	Chile	45.96	
7	Juan Tello	Peru	39.80	

=== Hammer throw ===
28 June

Rank	Name	Nationality	Result	Notes
1st place, gold medalist(s)	Adrián Marzo	Argentina	65.12	
2nd place, silver medalist(s)	Andrés Charadía	Argentina	62.88	
3rd place, bronze medalist(s)	Pedro Rivail Atílio	Brazil	61.32	
4	Ivam Bertelli	Brazil	60.32	
5	Edmundo Castillo	Venezuela	53.50	
6	Eduardo Acuña	Peru	46.56	

=== Javelin throw ===
30 June

Rank	Name	Nationality	Result	Notes
1st place, gold medalist(s)	Luis Lucumí	Colombia	74.42	
2nd place, silver medalist(s)	Rodrigo Zelaya	Chile	73.88	
3rd place, bronze medalist(s)	Gustavo Wielandt	Chile	68.64	
4	Alan Dashwood	Argentina	64.14	
5	Volmir Zilli	Brazil	60.98	
6	Nivaldo Beje Filho	Brazil	59.30	
7	Leónidas López	Ecuador	49.46	
8	Tomislav Muhvic	Peru	39.08	

=== Decathlon ===
29–30 June

The highest mark recorded in each event is highlighted in yellow

Rank	Athlete	Nationality	100m	LJ	SP	HJ	400m	110m H	DT	PV	JT	1500m	Points	Notes
1st place, gold medalist(s)	José de Assis	Brazil	11.19	7.04	13.14	1.94	49.23	15.45	37.14	3.80	56.96	4:44.51	7227	
2nd place, silver medalist(s)	Marco Antônio Brito	Brazil	11.38	6.43	10.04	1.88	49.24	18.15	33.70	3.20	44.30	4:31.36	6189	
3rd place, bronze medalist(s)	Giovanny Gudiño	Ecuador	12.25	5.79	9.05	1.94	55.86	18.35	20.76	NM	33.24	4:52.09	4617	
4	Freddy Nieves	Ecuador	11.81	6.23	7.65	1.82	52.87	18.56	14.70	NM	34.30	4:53.26	4611	

== Women's results ==
=== 100 metres ===
Heats – 28 June
Wind:
Heat 1: +0.6 m/s, Heat 2: +0.4 m/s

Rank	Heat	Name	Nationality	Time	Notes
1	2	Claudete Alves Pina	Brazil	11.56	Q
2	1	Berenice Ferreira	Brazil	11.76	Q
3	2	Elia Mera	Colombia	11.89	Q
4	1	Alejandra Quiñones	Colombia	11.97	Q
5	1	Margarita Martiarena	Uruguay	12.14	Q
5	2	Emmy Ochoa	Venezuela	12.14	Q
7	1	Virginia Lebreo	Argentina	12.17	q
8	2	Denise Sharpe	Argentina	12.20	q
9	2	Lisette Rondón	Chile	12.28	
10	2	Ana María Luzio	Bolivia	12.55	
11	1	Sandra Antelo	Bolivia	12.56	
12	1	Gilda Massa	Peru	12.59	

Final – 28 June

Wind: -1.1 m/s

Rank	Name	Nationality	Time	Notes
1st place, gold medalist(s)	Claudete Alves Pina	Brazil	11.84	
2nd place, silver medalist(s)	Berenice Ferreira	Brazil	11.93	
3rd place, bronze medalist(s)	Alejandra Quiñones	Colombia	11.96	
4	Elia Mera	Colombia	12.15	
5	Margarita Martiarena	Uruguay	12.23	
6	Virginia Lebreo	Argentina	12.31	
7	Emmy Ochoa	Venezuela	12.34	
8	Denise Sharpe	Argentina	12.37	

=== 200 metres ===
Heats – 28 June
Wind:
Heat 1: +0.7 m/s, Heat 2: +0.3 m/s

Rank	Heat	Name	Nationality	Time	Notes
1	1	Ximena Restrepo	Colombia	23.21	Q, CR
2	1	Claudete Alves Pina	Brazil	23.34	Q
3	2	Eliane de Souza	Brazil	24.16	Q
4	2	Claudia Acerenza	Uruguay	24.19	Q
5	1	Hannelore Grosser	Chile	24.51	Q
6	2	Emmy Ochoa	Venezuela	24.61	Q
7	1	Virginia Lebreo	Argentina	24.75	q
8	2	Denise Sharpe	Argentina	24.78	q
9	1	Laura Abel	Uruguay	24.93	
10	1	Jackeline Solís	Bolivia	25.52	
11	2	Sandra Antelo	Bolivia	25.64	
12	1	Ana Solano	Ecuador	27.72	

Final – 29 June

Wind: +0.1 m/s

Rank	Name	Nationality	Time	Notes
1st place, gold medalist(s)	Ximena Restrepo	Colombia	23.21	=CR
2nd place, silver medalist(s)	Claudete Alves Pina	Brazil	23.37	
3rd place, bronze medalist(s)	Eliane de Souza	Brazil	23.92	
4	Emmy Ochoa	Venezuela	24.21	
5	Claudia Acerenza	Uruguay	24.27	
6	Hannelore Grosser	Chile	24.55	
7	Virginia Lebreo	Argentina	24.57	
8	Denise Sharpe	Argentina	24.93	

=== 400 metres ===
Heats – 29 June

Rank	Heat	Name	Nationality	Time	Notes
1	1	Eliane de Souza	Brazil	54.60	Q
2	2	Maria Magnólia Figueiredo	Brazil	54.85	Q
3	1	Ángela Mancilla	Colombia	55.07	Q
4	1	Claudia Acerenza	Uruguay	55.26	Q
5	2	Ismenia Guzmán	Chile	55.45	Q
6	2	Inés Justet	Uruguay	55.81	Q
7	1	Sara Montecinos	Chile	57.34	q
8	2	Janeth Castillo	Venezuela	57.57	q
9	1	Jackeline Solís	Bolivia	57.77	
10	2	Graciela Maidana	Paraguay	57.79	
11	1	Daniela Lebreo	Argentina	57.82	
12	2	Patricia Martínez	Peru	59.54	
13	1	Mayra Carchi	Ecuador	1:00.62	
14	1	Maritza Cuba	Peru	1:01.05	

Final – 30 June

Rank	Name	Nationality	Time	Notes
1st place, gold medalist(s)	Maria Magnólia Figueiredo	Brazil	51.56	CR
2nd place, silver medalist(s)	Eliane de Souza	Brazil	53.76	
3rd place, bronze medalist(s)	Ángela Mancilla	Colombia	54.11	
4	Claudia Acerenza	Uruguay	54.55	
5	Inés Justet	Uruguay	55.46	
6	Ismenia Guzmán	Chile	55.92	
7	Sara Montecinos	Chile	57.05	
8	Janeth Castillo	Venezuela	57.88	

=== 800 metres ===
28 June

Rank	Heat	Name	Nationality	Time	Notes
1st place, gold medalist(s)	?	Maria Magnólia Figueiredo	Brazil	2:00.45	CR
2nd place, silver medalist(s)	?	Luciana Mendes	Brazil	2:04.44	
3rd place, bronze medalist(s)	?	Amparo Alba	Colombia	2:07.60	
4	?	Soledad Acerenza	Uruguay	2:08.99	
5	?	Adriana Martínez	Ecuador	2:09.04	
6	?	Paula Val	Argentina	2:10.76	
7	?	Janeth Castillo	Venezuela	2:11.10	
8	?	Sara Montecinos	Chile	2:13.88	
9	?	Patricia Martínez	Peru	2:14.19	
10	?	Niusha Mancilla	Bolivia	2:14.50	
11	?	Mónica Chalá	Ecuador	2:15.78	
12	?	Graciela Maidana	Paraguay	2:16.10	
13	?	Maritza Cuba	Peru	2:19.69	

=== 1500 metres ===
28 June

Rank	Name	Nationality	Time	Notes
1st place, gold medalist(s)	Rita de Jesus	Brazil	4:19.18	CR
2nd place, silver medalist(s)	Celia dos Santos	Brazil	4:21.64	
3rd place, bronze medalist(s)	Amparo Alba	Colombia	4:29.48	
4	Rosa Ibarra	Colombia	4:34.85	
5	Paula Val	Argentina	4:36.09	
6	Niusha Mancilla	Bolivia	4:38.86	
7	Mónica Chalá	Ecuador	4:46.33	

=== 3000 metres ===
30 June

Rank	Name	Nationality	Time	Notes
1st place, gold medalist(s)	Carmem de Oliveira	Brazil	9:17.50	CR
2nd place, silver medalist(s)	Rita de Jesus	Brazil	9:24.44	
3rd place, bronze medalist(s)	Ruth Jaime	Peru	9:39.04	
4	Sandra Ruales	Ecuador	9:46.00	
5	Rosa Ibarra	Colombia	9:51.59	
6	María Inés Rodríguez	Argentina	9:52.08	
7	Carmen Naranjo	Ecuador	9:53.72	
8	Marisol Cossio	Bolivia	10:10.13	
9	Esneda Londoño	Colombia	10:35.19	

=== 10,000 metres ===
28 June

Rank	Name	Nationality	Time	Notes
1st place, gold medalist(s)	Carmem de Oliveira	Brazil	33:27.85	CR
2nd place, silver medalist(s)	Solange de Souza	Brazil	34:00.90	
3rd place, bronze medalist(s)	Sandra Ruales	Ecuador	34:57.00	
4	Carmen Naranjo	Ecuador	35:20.87	
5	Yolanda Casas	Peru	35:21.13	
6	Ruth Jaime	Peru	36:21.29	
7	María Inés Rodríguez	Argentina	37:35.50	
8	Esneda Londoño	Colombia	38:36.45	

=== 100 metres hurdles ===
Heats – 29 June
Wind:
Heat 1: -0.2 m/s, Heat 2: -0.2 m/s

Rank	Heat	Name	Nationality	Time	Notes
1	2	Arlene Phillips	Venezuela	13.97	Q
2	1	Carmen Bezanilla	Chile	14.00	Q
3	1	Anabella von Kesselstatt	Argentina	14.05	Q
4	2	Lucy da Conceiçao	Brazil	14.41	Q
5	1	Juraciara da Silva	Brazil	14.91	Q
6	1	Rosa Morales	Peru	14.91	q
7	2	Gilda Massa	Peru	15.07	Q
8	2	Ingrid Meilicker	Paraguay	15.08	q
9	2	Lisette Rondón	Chile	15.52	
10	1	Gabriela Beatler	Ecuador	16.11	

Final – 30 June

Wind: -1.8 m/s

Rank	Name	Nationality	Time	Notes
1st place, gold medalist(s)	Carmen Bezanilla	Chile	13.73	
2nd place, silver medalist(s)	Arlene Phillips	Venezuela	13.85	
3rd place, bronze medalist(s)	Anabella von Kesselstatt	Argentina	14.20	
4	Lucy da Conceiçao	Brazil	14.38	
5	Juraciara da Silva	Brazil	14.72	
6	Gilda Massa	Peru	14.88	
7	Rosa Morales	Peru	15.07	
8	Ingrid Meilicker	Paraguay	15.10	

=== 400 metres hurdles ===
Heats – 28 June

Rank	Heat	Name	Nationality	Time	Notes
1	2	Maria José dos Santos	Brazil	59.64	Q
2	2	Maribelcy Peña	Colombia	59.94	Q
3	2	Arlene Phillips	Venezuela	1:00.94	Q
4	1	Liliana Chalá	Ecuador	1:01.29	Q
5	1	Lucimara Machado	Brazil	1:01.31	Q
6	2	Inés Justet	Uruguay	1:02.96	q
7	1	Anabella von Kesselstatt	Argentina	1:04.53	Q
8	1	Ana Atencio	Peru	1:06.84	q
9	2	Amalia Gómez	Peru	1:08.84	

Final – 29 June

Rank	Name	Nationality	Time	Notes
1st place, gold medalist(s)	Liliana Chalá	Ecuador	57.16	CR
2nd place, silver medalist(s)	Maribelcy Peña	Colombia	57.23	
3rd place, bronze medalist(s)	Arlene Phillips	Venezuela	58.42	
4	Maria José dos Santos	Brazil	58.75	
5	Anabella von Kesselstatt	Argentina	59.35	
6	Inés Justet	Uruguay	1:00.21	
7	Lucimara Machado	Brazil	1:01.35	
8	Ana Atencio	Peru	1:06.89	

=== 4 × 100 metres relay ===
29 June

Rank	Nation	Competitors	Time	Notes
1st place, gold medalist(s)	Brazil	Rita Gomes, Berenice Ferreira, Cleide Amaral, Eliane de Souza	44.87	
2nd place, silver medalist(s)	Colombia	Ángela Mancilla, Elia Mera, Alejandra Quiñones, Ximena Restrepo	45.00	
3rd place, bronze medalist(s)	Argentina	Daniela Lebreo, Anabella von Kesselstatt, Virginia Lebreo, Denise Sharpe	46.14	
4	Chile	Lisette Rondón, Carmen Bezanilla, Ismenia Guzmán, Hannelore Grosser	46.54	
5	Uruguay	Claudia Acerenza, Margarita Martiarena, Inés Justet, Soledad Acerenza	46.61	
6	Peru	Rosa Morales, Deysi Zereceda, Déborah de Souza, Gilda Massa	49.60	
7	Ecuador	Liliana Chalá, Ana Solano, Adriana Martínez, Mayra Carchi	50.18	

=== 4 × 400 metres relay ===
30 June

Rank	Nation	Competitors	Time	Notes
1st place, gold medalist(s)	Brazil	Maria Magnólia Figueiredo, Jupira da Graça, Janice Vera Cruz, Luciana Mendes	3:32.59	CR
2nd place, silver medalist(s)	Colombia	Ximena Restrepo, María Quiñones, Maribelcy Peña, Ángela Mancilla	3:36.56	
3rd place, bronze medalist(s)	Uruguay	Inés Justet, Soledad Acerenza, Laura Abel, Claudia Acerenza	3:40.19	NR
4	Chile	Sara Montecinos, Hannelore Grosser, Carmen Bezanilla, Ismenia Guzmán	3:40.43	
5	Argentina	Anabella von Kesselstatt, Paula Val, Daniela Lebreo, Virginia Lebreo	3:50.91	
6	Ecuador	Liliana Chalá, Mónica Chalá, Adriana Martínez, Mayra Carchi	3:53.14	
7	Peru	Ana Atencio, Patricia Martínez, Amalia Gómez, Maritza Cuba	3:57.45	

=== 10,000 metres walk ===
30 June

Rank	Name	Nationality	Time	Notes
1st place, gold medalist(s)	Gloria Moreno	Colombia	52:40.5	
2nd place, silver medalist(s)	Bertha Vera	Ecuador	52:53.2	
3rd place, bronze medalist(s)	Ivanna Hehn	Brazil	53:38.1	
4	Miriam Ramón	Ecuador	54:39.1	
5	Rosemar Piazza	Brazil	55:12.1	
6	Lidia de Carriego	Argentina	58:27.0	
7	Ruth Tenicela	Peru	1:03:52.7	
8	Brenda Astudillo	Peru	1:05:11.8	

=== High jump ===
28 June

Rank	Name	Nationality	Result	Notes
1st place, gold medalist(s)	Orlane dos Santos	Brazil	1.89	CR
2nd place, silver medalist(s)	Mónica Lunkmoss	Brazil	1.81	
3rd place, bronze medalist(s)	Leonor Carter	Chile	1.75	
4	Liliana Derfler	Argentina	1.70	
5	María Alejandra Chomalí	Chile	1.70	

=== Long jump ===
29 June

Rank	Name	Nationality	Result	Notes
1st place, gold medalist(s)	Rita Slompo	Brazil	5.94	
2nd place, silver medalist(s)	Luciana dos Santos	Brazil	5.78	
3rd place, bronze medalist(s)	Ingrid Meilicker	Paraguay	5.51	
4	Ana María Luzio	Bolivia	5.41	
5	Deysi Zereceda	Peru	5.37	
6	Déborah de Souza	Peru	5.29	

=== Shot put ===
30 June

Rank	Name	Nationality	Result	Notes
1st place, gold medalist(s)	María Isabel Urrutia	Colombia	16.34	CR
2nd place, silver medalist(s)	Elisângela Adriano	Brazil	16.04	
3rd place, bronze medalist(s)	Alexandra Amaro	Brazil	14.95	
4	Virginia Salomón	Venezuela	13.72	
5	Rosa Peña	Peru	12.56	
6	Elvira Padilla	Peru	12.16	
7	Sonia Favre	Argentina	11.54	
8	Claudia Larenas	Chile	11.01	

=== Discus throw ===
29 June

Rank	Name	Nationality	Result	Notes
1st place, gold medalist(s)	María Isabel Urrutia	Colombia	51.70	CR
2nd place, silver medalist(s)	Fátima Germano	Brazil	49.74	
3rd place, bronze medalist(s)	Rosana Piovesan	Brazil	47.80	
4	Claudia Larenas	Chile	47.30	
5	Elvira Padilla	Peru	29.90	
6	Isabel Ordoñez	Ecuador	20.52	

=== Javelin throw ===
28 June

Rank	Name	Nationality	Result	Notes
1st place, gold medalist(s)	Marieta Riera	Venezuela	51.70	CR
2nd place, silver medalist(s)	Sueli dos Santos	Brazil	56.64	
3rd place, bronze medalist(s)	Mônica Rocha	Brazil	50.26	
4	Verónica Prieto	Colombia	48.58	
5	Sonia Favre	Argentina	43.00	
6	Isabel Ordoñez	Ecuador	40.66	

=== Heptathlon ===
29–30 June

The highest mark recorded in each event is highlighted in yellow

Rank	Athlete	Nationality	100m H	HJ	SP	200m	LJ	JT	800m	Points	Notes
1st place, gold medalist(s)	Zorobabelia Córdoba	Colombia	14.76	1.67	13.45	25.22	5.84	44.62	2:30.32	5564	
2nd place, silver medalist(s)	Conceição Geremias	Brazil	14.53	1.67	12.80	25.90	5.69	36.40	2:31.16	5277	
3rd place, bronze medalist(s)	Ana Lúcia Silva	Brazil	15.82	1.64	12.25	26.46	5.54	36.58	2:40.53	4837	
4	Liliana Derfler	Argentina	14.54	1.73	8.15	26.46	5.82	28.96	3:32.90	4335	
5	Isabel Ordoñez	Ecuador	17.83	1.46	9.25	28.44	4.60	35.48	2:52.91	3630	
