= 1989 South American Championships in Athletics =

- Dates: 5–8 August
- Host city: Medellín, Colombia
- Venue: Estadio Alfonso Galvis Duque
- Events: 41
- Participation: 223 athletes from 10 nations

The 1989 South American Championships in Athletics were held in Medellín, Colombia, between 5 and 8 August.

It was the first edition to feature women's racewalking.

== Medal summary ==
=== Men's events ===
Event	Gold		Silver		Bronze	
100 metres (wind: 0.0 m/s)	John Mena; Colombia	10.4A	Florencio Aguilar; Panama	10.4A	Antônio dos Santos Filho; Brazil	10.5A
200 metres	Robson da Silva; Brazil	20.44A	Sérgio Menezes; Brazil	20.88A	Jesús Malavé; Venezuela	21.12A
400 metres	Sérgio Menezes; Brazil	45.88A	Wilson Cañizales; Colombia	45.91A	Roberto Bortolotto; Brazil	46.38A
800 metres	Pablo Squella; Chile	1:49.19A	Geraldo de Assis; Brazil	1:49.29A	Edgar de Oliveira; Brazil	1:49.51A
1500 metres	Edgar de Oliveira; Brazil	3:47.7A	José López; Venezuela	3:47.9A	José Abel Segura; Colombia	3:48.9A
5000 metres	Geraldo Francisco de Assis; Brazil	14:09.60A	Silvio Salazar; Colombia	14:10.58A	Silvio Guerra; Ecuador	14:11.20A
10,000 metres	Rolando Vera; Ecuador	29:28.1A	Geraldo Francisco de Assis; Brazil	29:55.5A	Silvio Salazar; Colombia	30:14.3A
Marathon	Gustavo Paredes; Ecuador	2:23:42A	Wilson Pérez; Ecuador	2:23:47A	Fernando Guio; Colombia	2:39:44A
110 metres hurdles (wind: +0.1 m/s)	Pedro Chiamulera; Brazil	14.1A	Eliexer Pulgar; Venezuela	14.1A	Elvis Cedeño; Venezuela	14.1A
400 metres hurdles	Pedro Chiamulera; Brazil	50.12A	Antônio Dias Ferreira; Brazil	51.26A	Antonio Smith; Venezuela	51.32A
3000 metres steeplechase	Adauto Domingues; Brazil	8:49.2A	Carlos Ravani; Brazil	8:53.9A	Ricardo Vera; Uruguay	8:57.5A
4 × 100 metres relay	Brazil; Fernando Botasso; Carlos de Oliveira; Antônio dos Santos Filho; Arnaldo da Silva	39.84A	Colombia; Robinson Urrutia; Fernando Arroyo; Wilson Cañizales; John Mena	39.87A	Venezuela; Reinaldo Santana; Mervin Solarte; Ángel Tovar; Edgar Chourio	40.81A
4 × 400 metres relay	Venezuela; Rafael Díaz; Wilfredo Ferrer; Henry Aguiar; Jesús Malavé	3:05.76A CR	Brazil; Antônio Ferreira; Sidnei de Souza; Pedro Chiamulera; Roberto Bortolotto	3:06.33A	Chile; Hernán Hevia; Alejandro Krauss; Pablo Squella; Carlos Morales	3:06.34A
20 kilometre road walk	Sérgio Galdino; Brazil	1:24:51A	Héctor Moreno; Colombia	1:24:56A	Querubín Moreno; Colombia	1:28:32A
High jump	Milton Riitano Francisco; Brazil	2.15A	Santiago Lozada; Peru	2.09A	José Luís Mendes; Brazil	2.03A
Pole vault	Renato Bortolocci; Brazil	5.10A	Miguel Saldarriaga; Colombia	5.10A	Elson de Souza; Brazil	4.90A
Long jump	Luis Lorduy; Colombia	7.77A	Ángel Tovar; Venezuela	7.74A	Olivier Cadier; Brazil	7.68A
Triple jump	Sergio Saavedra; Venezuela	16.86A NR	Abcelvio Rodrigues; Brazil	16.48A	Jorge da Silva; Brazil	16.38A
Shot put	Gert Weil; Chile	19.98A	Adilson Oliveira; Brazil	17.49A	João dos Santos; Brazil	16.25A
Discus throw	João dos Santos; Brazil	58.00A CR	José Jacques; Brazil	52.88A	Gert Weil; Chile	52.36A
Hammer throw	Marcelo Pugliese; Argentina	67.00A CR	Andrés Charadia; Argentina	65.56A	Pedro Rivail Atílio; Brazil	63.34A
Javelin throw	Luis Lucumí; Colombia	77.80A CR	Antar Martínez; Colombia	67.20A	Luis Carrasco; Venezuela	65.38A
Decathlon	Martín Badano; Argentina	7378A	José de Assis; Brazil	7324A	Oscar Veit; Argentina	7033A

=== Women's events ===
Event	Gold		Silver		Bronze	
100 metres (wind: 0.0 m/s)	Amparo Caicedo; Colombia	11.3A	Ximena Restrepo; Colombia	11.4A	Cleide Amaral; Brazil	11.5A
200 metres	Olga Conte; Argentina	23.33A CR	Jupira da Graça; Brazil	23.44A	Amparo Caicedo; Colombia	23.68A
400 metres	Norfalia Carabalí; Colombia	52.10A CR	Olga Conte; Argentina	53.47A	Claudete Alves Pina; Brazil	54.26A
800 metres	Maria Andrade; Brazil	2:08.79A	Amparo Alba; Colombia	2:08.83A	Célia dos Santos; Brazil	2:08.99A
1500 metres	Rita de Jesus; Brazil	4:31.6A	Silvana Pereira; Brazil	4:32.1A	Janeth Caizalitín; Ecuador	4:32.9A
3000 metres	Carmem de Oliveira; Brazil	9:22.58A CR	Janeth Caizalitín; Ecuador	9:36.43A	Rita de Jesus; Brazil	9:36.95A
10,000 metres	Carmem de Oliveira; Brazil	35:08.5A	Sandra Ruales; Ecuador	35:55.2A	Yolanda Quimbita; Ecuador	35:55.3A
100 metres hurdles (wind: 0.0 m/s)	Juraciara da Silva; Brazil	13.5A	Ana María Comaschi; Argentina	13.7A	Arlene Phillips; Venezuela	13.8A
400 metres hurdles	Liliana Chalá; Ecuador	57.68A CR	Maribelcy Peña; Colombia	60.30A	Joana Caetano; Brazil	60.69A
4 × 100 metres relay	Brazil; Claudileia dos Santos; Jupira da Graça; Rosmeire Lopes; Cleide Amaral	44.69A CR	Colombia; Rosa Segovia; Alejandra Quiñones; Amparo Caicedo; Norfalia Carabalí	45.26A	Uruguay; Margarita Martirena; Inés Justet; Soledad Acerenza; Claudia Acerenza	46.61A
4 × 400 metres relay	Colombia; Rosa Segovia; Alejandra Quiñones; Maribelcy Peña; Norfalia Carabalí	3:37.0A CR	Brazil; Rosângela Oliveira; Jupira da Graça; Maria do Carmo Fialho; Claudete Alves Pina	3:37.7A	Uruguay; Inés Justet; Margarita Martirena; Soledad Acerenza; Claudia Acerenza	3:44.0A
10,000 metres track walk	Miriam Ramón; Ecuador	50:30.3A CR	Luisa Nivicela; Ecuador	50:30.3A	Liliana Bermeo; Colombia	51:02.4A
High jump	Orlane dos Santos; Brazil	1.85A	Mônica Lunkmoss; Brazil	1.79A	Janeth Lagoyete; Colombia	1.70A
Long jump	Rita Slompo; Brazil	6.22A	Maria de Jesus; Brazil	6.05A	Ana María Comaschi; Argentina	5.96A
Shot put	Marinalva dos Santos; Brazil	15.16A CR	Alexandra Amaro; Brazil	14.95A	Virginia Salomón; Venezuela	14.20A
Discus throw	Rosana Piovesan; Brazil	49.36A	Berta Gómez; Colombia	47.54A	Amélia Moreira; Brazil	44.54A
Javelin throw	Mônica Rocha; Brazil	54.94A	Marieta Riera; Venezuela	54.70A	Sueli dos Santos; Brazil	52.78A
Heptathlon	Conceição Geremias; Brazil	5574A	Zorobabelia Córdoba; Colombia	5436A	Joelma Souza; Brazil	5271A

A = affected by altitude

== Medal table ==
Rank	Nation	Gold	Silver	Bronze	Total
1	Brazil (BRA)	24	16	17	57
2	Colombia (COL)	6	12	7	25
3	Ecuador (ECU)	4	4	3	11
4	Argentina (ARG)	3	3	2	8
5	Venezuela (VEN)	2	4	7	13
6	Chile (CHI)	2	0	2	4
7	Panama (PAN)	0	1	0	1
7	Peru (PER)	0	1	0	1
9	Uruguay (URU)	0	0	3	3
Totals (9 entries)		41	41	41	123

== Participating nations ==
- Argentina (6)
- Bolivia (2)
- Brazil (62)
- Chile (20)
- Colombia (39)
- Ecuador (26)
- Panama (19)
- Peru (3)
- Uruguay (5)
- Venezuela (41)

== See also ==
- 1989 in athletics (track and field)
