= Athletics at the 1989 Bolivarian Games =

Athletics at the XI Bolivarian Games
- Dates: January 14–25
- Host city: Maracaibo, Venezuela
- Venue: Estadio José Pachencho Romero
- Level: Senior
- Events: 40 (23 men, 17 women)

Athletics competitions at the 1989 Bolivarian Games were held at the Estadio José Pachencho Romero in Maracaibo, Venezuela, between January 14–25, 1989.

A detailed history of the early editions of the Bolivarian Games between 1938 and 1989 was published in a book written (in Spanish) by José Gamarra Zorrilla, former president of the Bolivian Olympic Committee, and first president (1976-1982) of ODESUR. Gold medal winners from Ecuador were published by the Comité Olímpico Ecuatoriano.

A total of 40 events were contested, 23 by men and 17 by women.

== Medal summary ==
Medal winners were published.

=== Men ===
Event	Gold		Silver		Bronze	
100 metres (wind: 4.7 m/s)	Florencio Aguilar (PAN)	10.49 w	Arnaldo Oquendo (VEN)	10.58 w	Cristóbal Caguao (VEN)	10.62 w
200 metres (wind: 1.2 m/s)	Jesús Malavé (VEN)	21.10	Florencio Aguilar (PAN)	21.27	Richard Kristen (VEN)	21.51
400 metres	Jesús Malavé (VEN)	46.69	Wilson Cañizales (COL)	46.87	Henry Aguiar (VEN)	47.30
800 metres	José Abel Segura (COL)	1:51.67	Juan Navarro (VEN)	1:52.56	Héctor Caicedo (COL)	1:53.76
1500 metres	José Abel Segura (COL)	3:55.54	Juan Navarro (VEN)	3:57.03	Reynaldo Cuadros (PER)	3:57.62
5000 metres	Juan José Castillo (PER)	14:18.11	Rolando Vera (ECU)	14:24.64	Juan Díaz (VEN)	14:39.06
10000 metres	Rolando Vera (ECU)	29:54.22	Néstor Jami (ECU)	30:37.65	Oscar Mejías (VEN)	30:59.62
Half Marathon	Pedro Ortiz (COL)	1:07:46	Silvio Guerra (ECU)	1:08:25	Gustavo Paredes (ECU)	1:08:43
3000 metres steeplechase	Juan José Castillo (PER)	8:56.98	Eddy Punina (ECU)	9:03.87	Arnaldo Rivas (VEN)	9:09.29
110 metres hurdles (wind: 2.0 m/s)	Eliexer Pulgar (VEN)	14.19	Juan Saldarriaga (COL)	14.30	Luis Bazán (VEN)	14.43
400 metres hurdles	Wilfredo Ferrer (VEN)	51.56	Antonio Smith (VEN)	53.10	Arnold Chara (COL)	53.11
4 x 100 metres relay	Venezuela; Bueno; Jesús Malavé; Cristobal Caguao; Arnaldo Oquendo	40.66	Colombia; Robinson Urrutia; Wilson Cañizales; John Mena; Juan Villamizar	40.91	Peru; Óscar Fernández; Dagiau; Marco Mautino; Giorgio Mautino	41.39
4 x 400 metres relay	Colombia; Arnold Chará; Juan Villamizar; Javier Bermúdez; Wilson Cañizales	3:13.20	Venezuela	3:13.28	Peru	3:17.63
20 Kilometres Road Walk	Héctor Moreno (COL)	1:29:07	Carlos Ramones (VEN)	1:29:36	Juan Rojas (ECU)	1:30:17
High jump	Santiago Lozada (PER)	2.14	Iaston Fuller (VEN)	2.06	Fernando Valiente (PER)	2.06
Pole vault	Konstantín Zagustín (VEN)	4.70	Juan Saldarriaga (COL)	4.70	Dean Torres (ECU)	4.30
Long jump	Ángel Tovar (VEN)	7.36	Fernando Valiente (PER)	7.28	Jorge González (COL)	7.18
Triple jump	Sergio Saavedra (VEN)	15.96	José Quiñaliza (ECU)	15.92	Ricardo Valiente (PER)	15.60
Shot put	Carlos Aragón (COL)	15.38	Wilfredo Jaimes (VEN)	15.08	Luis García (ECU)	13.23
Discus throw	Wilfredo Jaimes (VEN)	46.66	Luis Fernando Garrido (COL)	46.06	Luis Palacios (VEN)	43.28
Hammer throw	David Castrillón (COL)	57.54	Roberto Lozano (COL)	52.48	Carlos López (VEN)	52.44
Javelin throw	Luis Lucumí (COL)	71.12	Luis Martínez (COL)	69.94	Luis Carrasco (VEN)	69.72
Decathlon	Fidel Solórzano (ECU)	6637	José Velázquez (VEN)	5034		

=== Women ===
Event	Gold		Silver		Bronze	
100 metres (wind: 2.8 m/s)	Amparo Caicedo (COL)	11.41 w	Alejandra Quiñones (COL)	11.87 w	Marbelis Barriga (VEN)	12.08 w
200 metres (wind: 1.8 m/s)	Amparo Caicedo (COL)	23.36	Norfalia Carabalí (COL)	23.37	Emy Ochoa (VEN)	24.77
400 metres	Norfalia Carabalí (COL)	54.27	Filomena Casierra (ECU)	57.55	Magaly Segovia (COL)	57.66
800 metres	Milexa Figueroa (VEN)	2:15.01	Ingrid Rosero (ECU)	2:15.06	Rocío Estrada (COL)	2:15.73
1500 metres	Damelis Guerra (VEN)	4:35.86	Elvira Velandra (COL)	4:37.33	Ovilma Ruíz (VEN)	4:39.49
5000 metres	Martha Tenorio (ECU)	16:50.28	Elvira Velandra (COL)	17:03.60	Elvia Euconsela (ECU)	17:24.05
100 metres hurdles	Nancy Vallecilla (ECU)	13.59 w	Arlene Phillips (VEN)	13.92 w	Martha Dinas (COL)	14.81 w
400 metres hurdles	Maribelsy Peña (COL)	61.21	Ingrid Rosero (ECU)	64.00	Rosa Urbina (VEN)	64.82
4 x 100 metres relay	Colombia; Elia Mera; Alejandra Quiñones; Amparo Caicedo; Norfalia Carabalí	46.00	Venezuela; Carmen Méndez; Marbelis Barriga; Emy Ochoa; López	46.91	Ecuador; Filomena Casierra; Cristina Bustamante; Nancy Vallecilla; Ingrid Rosero	49.35
4 x 400 metres relay	Colombia; Magaly Segovia; Alejandra Quiñones; Maribelsi Peña; Norfalia Carabalí	3:44.42			Ecuador; Filomena Casierra; Ingrid Rosero; Cristina Bustamante; Amparo Flores	3:54.30
10 Kilometres Track Walk	Miriam Ramón (ECU)	46:15.2	Luisa Nivicela (ECU)	48:25.8	Gloria Moreno (COL)	49:01.6
High jump	Fernanda Mosquera (COL)	1.70	Nancy Vallecilla (ECU)	1.64	Yanelis Barreto (VEN)	1.61
Long jump	Nancy Vallecilla (ECU)	5.72	Sorelis Bohórquez (VEN)	5.65	Daisy Zereceda (PER)	5.57
Shot put	María Isabel Urrutia (COL)	15.41	Virginia Salomón (VEN)	13.70	Carmen Chalá (ECU)	13.55
Discus throw	María Isabel Urrutia (COL)	50.22	Yunaira Piña (VEN)	44.30	Jenny Quintero (VEN)	42.32
Javelin throw	Marieta Riera (VEN)	54.22	Mariela Riera (VEN)	47.52	Zorobabelia Córdoba (COL)	45.94
Heptathlon	Nancy Vallecilla (ECU)	5102	Zorobabelia Córdoba (COL)	4724	Milly Figueroa (COL)	4414

== Medal table (unofficial) ==
* Host nation (Venezuela)

Rank	Nation	Gold	Silver	Bronze	Total
1	Colombia (COL)	17	12	9	38
2	Venezuela (VEN)*	12	15	16	43
3	Ecuador (ECU)	7	10	8	25
4	Peru (PER)	3	1	6	10
5	Panama (PAN)	1	1	0	2
Totals (5 entries)		40	39	39	118
