= Martirena =

Martirena is a surname. Notable people with the surname include:

- Gastón Martirena (born 2000), Uruguayan footballer
- Margarita Martirena (born 1966), Uruguayan sprinter
- Patricia Janiot (born 1963), Colombian-American journalist, full name Ángela Patricia Janiot Martirena
