= Athletics at the 1991 Pan American Games – Women's heptathlon =

Women's heptathlon at the Pan American Games

The women's heptathlon event at the 1991 Pan American Games was held in Havana, Cuba on 10 and 11 August.

== Results ==
The highest mark recorded in each event is highlighted in yellow

Rank	Athlete	Nationality	100m H	HJ	SP	200m	LJ	JT	800m	Points	Notes
1st place, gold medalist(s)	DeDee Nathan	United States	14.09	1.74	12.78	25.29	5.97	37.34	2:15.91	5778	
2nd place, silver medalist(s)	Sharon Hainer	United States	14.01	1.68	12.08	25.63	5.65	47.65	2:13.95	5770	
3rd place, bronze medalist(s)	Magalys García	Cuba	13.92	1.62	11.63	24.87	5.65	47.09	2:16.17	5690	
4	Laiza Carrillo	Cuba	14.37	1.74	11.54	25.54	6.18	36.17	2:22.40	5592	
5	Ana María Comaschi	Argentina	14.28	1.65	12.58	24.80	5.41	38.62	2:18.13	5503	
	Dianne Guthrie	Jamaica	14.54	1.83	12.79	25.62	5.28	DNS	–	DNF	
	Catherine Bond	Canada	14.65	1.86	11.87	25.63	NM	NM	DNS	DNF	
	Zorobabella Cordoba	Colombia	14.57	1.65	12.49	DNS	–	–	–	DNF	
