= Alejandro Krauss =

Chilean sprinter (born 1964)

Personal information
- Full name: Alejandro Daniel Krauss Opazo
- Born: 27 September 1964 (age 62)

Sport
- Sport: Athletics
- Event: 400 metres
Medal record
Representing Chile
South American Games
Gold medal – first place	1986 Santiago	4x400m relay
Silver medal – second place	1986 Santiago	400m

Alejandro Daniel Krauss Opazo (born 27 September 1964) is a Chilean retired sprinter who specialised in the 400 metres. He won several medals at regional level.

His personal best in the event is 46.58 seconds set in Americana in 1992.

== International competitions ==
Year	Competition	Venue	Position	Event	Notes
Representing Chile
1981	South American Junior Championships	Rio de Janeiro, Brazil	3rd	4 × 400 m relay	3:16.1
1983	South American Junior Championships	Medellín, Colombia	5th	400 m	48.43
1985	South American Championships	Santiago, Chile	9th (h)	400 m	49.41
1985	South American Championships	Santiago, Chile	4th	4 × 400 m relay	3:11.32
1986	South American Games	Santiago, Chile	5th	200 m	21.62
1986	South American Games	Santiago, Chile	2nd	400 m	47.61
1986	South American Games	Santiago, Chile	1st	4 × 400 m relay	3:08.37
1987	Universiade	Zagreb, Yugoslavia	35th (h)	200 m	22.39
1987	Universiade	Zagreb, Yugoslavia	27th (h)	400 m	49.09
1987	Universiade	Zagreb, Yugoslavia	6th	4 × 400 m relay	3:10.76
1988	Ibero-American Championships	Mexico City, Mexico	15th (h)	200 m	21.58
1988	Ibero-American Championships	Mexico City, Mexico	7th	400 m	47.98
1988	Ibero-American Championships	Mexico City, Mexico	4th	4 × 400 m relay	3:08.50
1989	South American Championships	Medellín, Colombia	10th (h)	200 m	22.13
1989	South American Championships	Medellín, Colombia	8th (h)	400 m	49.44
1989	South American Championships	Medellín, Colombia	4th	4 × 400 m relay	3:11.32
1992	Ibero-American Championships	Seville, Spain	13th (h)	400 m	48.11
1992	Ibero-American Championships	Seville, Spain	5th	4 × 100 m relay	41.66
1992	Ibero-American Championships	Seville, Spain	3rd	4 × 400 m relay	3:06.34
1993	South American Championships	Lima, Peru	1st	400 m	47.6
1993	South American Championships	Lima, Peru	3rd	4 × 400 m relay	3:09.5
1997	South American Championships	Mar del Plata, Argentina	2nd	4 × 400 m relay	3:07.98
