= 1991 South American Championships in Athletics =

- Dates: 28–30 June
- Host city: Manaus, Brazil
- Venue: Vila Olímpica de Manaus
- Events: 41
- Participation: 257 athletes from 11 nations

The 36th South American Championships in Athletics were held in Manaus, Brazil, between 28 and 30 June 1991. It was the last edition to hold the Marathon event.

== Medal summary ==
=== Men's events ===
Event	Gold		Silver		Bronze	
100 metres (wind: +0.7 m/s)	Robson da Silva; Brazil	10.18	Arnaldo da Silva; Brazil	10.39	Carlos Moreno; Chile	10.44
200 metres (wind: +0.5 m/s)	Robson da Silva; Brazil	20.79	Marcelo Brivilati da Silva; Brazil	20.94	Jesús Malavé; Venezuela	21.18
400 metres	Carlos Morales; Chile	46.55	Roberto Bortolotto; Brazil	46.90	Henry Aguiar; Venezuela	47.02
800 metres	Flavio Godoy; Brazil	1:47.94	Luiz José Gonçalves; Brazil	1:48.16	Pablo Squella; Chile	1:48.21
1500 metres	Edgar de Oliveira; Brazil	3:42.41	Luiz José Gonçalves; Brazil	3:42.48	Carlos Naput; Argentina	3:50.09
5000 metres	Valdenor dos Santos; Brazil	14:09.03	Otoniel dos Santos; Brazil	14:13.35	Eduardo Navas; Venezuela	14:16.06
10,000 metres	Valdenor dos Santos; Brazil	29:25.20	Juan José Castillo; Peru	29:37.40	Roberto Punina; Ecuador	30:00.40
Marathon	Joseildo Rocha; Brazil	2:33:22	Luis Nempo; Chile	2:39:57	Doval da Silva; Brazil	2:41:38
3000 metres steeplechase	Adauto Domingues; Brazil	8:36.21 CR	Wander Moura; Brazil	8:49.11	Oscar Amaya; Argentina	8:52.08
110 metres hurdles (wind: -1.1 m/s)	Joilto Bonfim; Brazil	14.11	Elvis Cedeño; Venezuela	14.23	Eliexer Pulgar; Venezuela	14.38
400 metres hurdles	Eronilde de Araújo; Brazil	49.65 CR	Antonio Smith; Venezuela	50.14	Luis Bello; Venezuela	50.73
4 × 100 metres relay	Brazil; Joilto Bonfim; Arnaldo da Silva; Robson da Silva; Reginaldo Aguiar	39.90	Chile; Carlos Morales; Carlos Moreno; Héctor Fernández; Roberto Marshall	40.61	Argentina; Claudio Molocznik; Guillermo Cacián; José María Beduino; Claudio Arcas	41.22
4 × 400 metres relay	Brazil; Roberto Bortolotto; Jorge Costa; Geraldo Maranhão Jr. Ediélson Tenório	3:05.60 CR	Venezuela; Antonio Smith; Henry Aguiar; José Moisés Zambrano; Luis Bello	3:08.39	Argentina; Claudio Arcas; José María Beduino; Guillermo Cacián; Claudio Molocznik	3:11.10
20 kilometres road walk	Sérgio Galdino; Brazil	1:26:26	Querubín Moreno; Colombia	1:28:56	Orlando Díaz; Colombia	1:30:22
High jump	Gilmar Mayo; Colombia	2.20 CR	Fernando Moreno; Argentina	2.17	Jorge Archanjo; Brazil	2.11
Pole vault	Cristián Aspillaga; Chile	5.00	Konstantín Zagustín; Venezuela	5.00	Thomas Riether; Chile	4.80
Long jump	Paulo de Oliveira; Brazil	7.83	Gelson Vaqueiro; Brazil	7.46	Jimmy Ávila; Panama	7.40
Triple jump	Anísio Silva; Brazil	16.15	Sergio Saavedra; Venezuela	15.98	Ednilson de Miranda; Brazil	15.74
Shot put	Gert Weil; Chile	18.37	Adilson Oliveira; Brazil	18.08	Yojer Medina; Venezuela	16.35
Discus throw	João dos Santos; Brazil	58.08 CR	Marcelo Pugliese; Argentina	53.08	Jair Teutonio; Brazil	51.62
Hammer throw	Adrián Marzo; Argentina	65.12	Andrés Charadia; Argentina	62.88	Pedro Rivail Atílio; Brazil	61.32
Javelin throw	Luis Lucumí; Colombia	74.42	Rodrigo Zelaya; Chile	73.88	Gustavo Wielandt; Chile	68.64
Decathlon	José de Assis; Brazil	7227	Marco Antônio Brito; Brazil	6189	Giovanny Gudino; Ecuador	4617

=== Women's events ===
Event	Gold		Silver		Bronze	
100 metres (wind: -1.1 m/s)	Claudete Alves Pina; Brazil	11.84	Berenice Ferreira; Brazil	11.93	Alejandra Quiñones; Colombia	11.96
200 metres (wind: +0.1 m/s)	Ximena Restrepo; Colombia	23.21 CR	Claudete Alves Pina; Brazil	23.37	Eliane de Souza; Brazil	23.92
400 metres	Maria Figueirêdo; Brazil	51.56 CR	Eliane de Souza; Brazil	53.76	Ángela Mancilla; Colombia	54.11
800 metres	Maria Figueirêdo; Brazil	2:00.45 CR	Luciana Mendes; Brazil	2:04.44	Amparo Alba; Colombia	2:07.60
1500 metres	Rita de Jesus; Brazil	4:19.18 CR	Célia dos Santos; Brazil	4:21.64	Amparo Alba; Colombia	4:29.48
3000 metres	Carmem de Oliveira; Brazil	9:17.50 CR	Rita de Jesus; Brazil	9:24.44	Ruth Jaime; Peru	9:39.04
10,000 metres	Carmem de Oliveira; Brazil	33:27.85 CR	Solange de Souza; Brazil	34:00.90	Sandra Ruales; Ecuador	34:57.00
100 metres hurdles (wind: -1.8 m/s)	Carmen Bezanilla; Chile	13.73	Arlene Phillips; Venezuela	13.85	Anabella von Kesselstatt; Argentina	14.20
400 metres hurdles	Liliana Chalá; Ecuador	57.16 CR	Maribelsy Peña; Colombia	57.23	Arlene Phillips; Venezuela	58.42
4 × 100 metres relay	Brazil; Rita Gomes; Berenice Ferreira; Cleide Amaral; Eliane de Souza	44.87	Colombia; Ángela Mancilla; Elia Mera; Alejandra Quiñones; Ximena Restrepo	45.00	Argentina; Daniela Lebreo; Anabella von Kesselstatt; Virginia Lebreo; Denise Sharpe	46.14
4 × 400 metres relay	Brazil; Maria Magnólia Figueiredo; Jucilene Garcez; Janice Vera Cruz; Luciana Mendes	3:32.59 CR	Colombia; Ximena Restrepo; María Quiñones; Maribelcy Pena; Ángela Quiñones	3:36.56	Uruguay; Inés Justet; Soledad Acerenza; Laura Abel; Claudia Acerenza	3:40.19 NR
10,000 metres track walk	Gloria Moreno; Chile	52:40.5	Bertha Vera; Ecuador	52:53.2	Ivana Henn; Brazil	53:38.1
High jump	Orlane dos Santos; Brazil	1.89 CR	Mônica Lunkmoss; Brazil	1.81	Leonor Carter; Chile	1.75
Long jump	Rita Slompo; Brazil	5.94	Luciana dos Santos; Brazil	5.78	Ingrid Meilicke; Paraguay	5.51
Shot put	María Isabel Urrutia; Colombia	16.34 CR	Elisângela Adriano; Brazil	16.04	Alexandra Amaro; Brazil	14.95
Discus throw	María Isabel Urrutia; Colombia	51.70 CR	Fátima Germano; Brazil	49.74	Rosana Piovesan; Brazil	47.80
Javelin throw	Marieta Riera; Venezuela	57.40 CR	Sueli dos Santos; Brazil	56.64	Mônica Rocha; Brazil	50.26
Heptathlon	Zorobabelia Córdoba; Colombia	5564	Conceição Geremias; Brazil	5277	Ana Lúcia Silva; Brazil	4837

== Medal table ==
Rank	Nation	Gold	Silver	Bronze	Total
1	Brazil	27	23	11	61
2	Colombia	6	4	5	15
3	Chile	5	3	5	13
4	Venezuela	1	6	7	14
5	Argentina	1	3	6	10
6	Ecuador	1	1	3	5
7	Peru	0	1	1	2
8	Panama	0	0	1	1
8	Paraguay	0	0	1	1
8	Uruguay	0	0	1	1
Totals (10 entries)		41	41	41	123

== Participating nations ==
- Argentina (26)
- Bolivia (9)
- Brazil (72)
- Chile (29)
- Colombia (22)
- Ecuador (24)
- Panama (1)
- Paraguay (2)
- Peru (39)
- Uruguay (7)
- Venezuela (26)

== See also ==
- 1991 in athletics (track and field)
