= 1983 South American Junior Championships in Athletics =

XV South American Junior Championships in Athletics
- Dates: June 9–12
- Host city: Medellín, Colombia
- Level: Under-20
- Events: 37
- Participation: about 162 athletes from 8 nations

The 15th South American Junior Championships in Athletics were held in Medellín, Colombia from June 9–12, 1983.

== Participation (unofficial) ==
Detailed result lists can be found on the "World Junior Athletics History" website. An unofficial count yields the number of about 162 athletes from about 8 countries: Argentina (29), Bolivia (1), Brazil (50), Chile (14), Colombia (45), Peru (4), Uruguay (2), Venezuela (17).

== Medal summary ==
Medal winners are published for men and women Complete results can be found on the "World Junior Athletics History" website.

=== Men ===
Event	Gold		Silver		Bronze	
100 metres	Robson da Silva (BRA)	10.49A	Arnaldo Silva (BRA)	10.68A	Mauricio Urquiza (CHI)	10.73A
200 metres	Robson da Silva (BRA)	21.10A	Sérgio Menezes (BRA)	21.31A	Diego Tabárez (COL)	21.78A
400 metres	Sérgio Menezes (BRA)	47.13A	Daniel Bambicha (ARG)	47.29A	Jesús Malavé (VEN)	48.01A
800 metres	Luis Migueles (ARG)	1:51.10A	Aaron Phillips (VEN)	1:51.39A	Héctor Saavedra (COL)	1:52.65A
1500 metres	Luis Migueles (ARG)	3:54.3A	Eduardo Remião (BRA)	3:56.4A	Uriel Rivera (COL)	3:56.5A
5000 metres	Fernando Guio (COL)	15:09.2A	Antonio Edgar (COL)	15:10.8A	Jorge Rojas (CHI)	15:19.9A
110 metres hurdles	Pedro Chiamulera (BRA)	15.21A	Lyndon Campos (BRA)	15.57A	Carlos McGarry (ARG)	16.40A
400 metres hurdles	Leonel Pedroza (COL)	52.82A	Pedro Chiamulera (BRA)	55.02A	Alberto Amat (COL)	55.37A
2000 metres steeplechase	Marcelo Cascabelo (ARG)	5:56.9A	Rinaldo Gomes (BRA)	5:58.7A	Elías Pereira (BRA)	5:58.9A
4 × 100 metres relay	Brazil; David do Rosário; Sérgio Menezes; Róbson da Silva; Arnaldo Silva	41.08A	Argentina; José María Beduino; Daniel Bambicha; Gabriel Martínez; Martín Domínguez	41.71A	Colombia; Luis Lourduy; Anselmo Machado; Juan González; Anselmo Pérez	42.54A
4 × 400 metres relay	Brazil; David do Rosário; Said Barcelos; Erasmo Damião; Sérgio Menezes	3:14.72A	Colombia; Julio Romero; Leonel Pedroza; Javier Ruíz; Diego Tabárez	3:16.56A	Argentina; Marcelo Cascabelo; Fernando Parola; Luis Migueles; Daniel Bambicha	3:19.98A
10,000 metres track walk	Mauricio Torres (COL)	44:38.2A	Marcos Hernández (COL)	45:21.5A	Omar Guerrero (VEN)	45:56.5A
High jump	Luciano Bacelli (BRA)	2.15A	Álvaro Mena (COL)	2.05A	Luis Varela (CHI)	2.05A
Pole vault	Miguel Saldarriaga (COL)	4.40A	Elson de Souza (BRA)	4.20A	Iván Estrada (COL)	4.20A
Long jump	Marcus Barros (BRA)	7.59A	Gabriel Martínez (ARG)	7.18A	Luis Lorduy (COL)	6.98A
Triple jump	Jailto Bonfim (BRA)	15.56A	Osvaldo Zabala (VEN)	15.17A	Isaías Xavier (BRA)	15.11A
Shot put	Adilson Oliveira (BRA)	18.11A	José de Souza (BRA)	17.79A	Pablo Milén (CHI)	15.79A
Discus throw	Celso da Cunha (BRA)	47.96A	Luis Fernando Garrido (COL)	46.52A	José de Souza (BRA)	43.02A
Hammer throw	David Castrillón (COL)	60.38A	Mário Leme (BRA)	57.46A	Joel Martínez (VEN)	54.40A
Javelin throw	Jorge Parraguirre (CHI)	63.20A	Carlos Ladino (COL)	61.22A	Nelson Méndez (ARG)	56.96A
Decathlon	Pedro da Silva (BRA)	7308A	Álvaro Mena (COL)	6905A	José Vieira (BRA)	5770A

=== Women ===
Event	Gold		Silver		Bronze	
100 metres	Amparo Caicedo (COL)	12.10A	Nara das Neves (BRA)	12.14A	Leone Rodrigues (BRA)	12.18A
200 metres	Jucilene Garcês (BRA)	24.13A	Nara das Neves (BRA)	24.43A	Florencia Chilberry (VEN)	25.02A
400 metres	Jucilene Garcês (BRA)	54.06A	Ivanete dos Santos (BRA)	56.51A	Margarita Carvajal (COL)	57.23A
800 metres	Norfalia Carabalí (COL)	2:08.72A	Liliana Mariel Góngora (ARG)	2:10.69A	Alcina dos Reis (BRA)	2:14.50A
1500 metres	Liliana Mariel Góngora (ARG)	4:34.19A	Ieda Juppa (BRA)	4:38.13A	Marcela Arraigada (CHI)	4:43.09A
3000 metres	Ieda Juppa (BRA)	10:13.08A	Silvana Pereira (BRA)	10:14.76A	Ruth Jaime (PER)	10:15.61A
100 metres hurdles	Erondina Barbosa (BRA)	14.81A	Susana Jenkins (ARG)	14.84A	María Martínez (CHI)	15.14A
200 metres hurdles	Marideyse Zarutski (BRA)	28.43A	Márcia Torres (BRA)	28.67A	Mariana Pösz (ARG)	28.83A
4 × 100 metres relay	Brazil; Aline Figueirêdo; Maria Simões; Cleone Ferreira; Nara das Neves	46.80A	Colombia; Nelcy Cardona; Lilian Medina; Margarita Olarte; Amparo Caicedo	48.15A	Argentina; Mariana Posz; Susana Jenkins; María Elena Croatto; Silvia Murialdo	48.44A
4 × 400 metres relay	Brazil; Aline Figueirêdo; Ivanete dos Santos; Nara das Neves; Jucilene Garcês	3:45.11A	Colombia; Amparo Caicedo; Lilian Medina; Margarita Carvajal; Norfalia Carabalí	3:49.91A	Argentina; Mariana Posz; Anabella Dal'Lago; Marta Ressia; María Elena Croatto	3:55.44A
High jump	Orlane dos Santos (BRA)	1.75A	Ana María Olivar (ARG)	1.70A	Andrea Sassi (URU)	1.70A
Long jump	Aline de Figueirêdo (BRA)	5.61A	Astrid Castro (COL)	5.57A	Márcia Gaudêncio (BRA)	5.43A
Shot put	Luz Bohórquez (VEN)	14.23A	María Isabel Urrutia (COL)	13.59A	Julia da Silva (BRA)	12.86A
Discus throw	María Isabel Urrutia (COL)	44.02A	Alejandra Bevacqua (ARG)	40.72A	Elena Winifred (CHI)	39.58A
Javelin throw	Sueli dos Santos (BRA)	50.42A	Mônica Rocha (BRA)	49.42A	Paulino Jaramillo (CHI)	44.34A
Heptathlon	Orlane dos Santos (BRA)	5461A	Nadia Katich (COL)	4981A	Ana María Comaschi (ARG)	4955A

== Medal table (unofficial) ==
* Host nation (Colombia)

Rank	Nation	Gold	Silver	Bronze	Total
1	Brazil (BRA)	23	16	8	47
2	Colombia (COL)*	8	12	8	28
3	Argentina (ARG)	4	7	7	18
4	Venezuela (VEN)	1	2	4	7
5	Chile (CHI)	1	0	8	9
6	Peru (PER)	0	0	1	1
6	Uruguay (URU)	0	0	1	1
Totals (7 entries)		37	37	37	111
