= ArchDaily =

Architecture website

- Screenshot of the website in December 2024
- Website type: Architecture website
- Available in: English, Spanish, Portuguese, Chinese
- Founders: David Basulto, David Assael
- CEO: Stephan Bachmann
- Website: archdaily.com
- Launched: 2008; 18 years ago

ArchDaily is a website covering architectural news, projects, products, events, interviews and competitions, opinion pieces, among others, catering to architects, designers and other interested parties.

It is currently based in Santiago de Chile, with offices in Berlin, Shanghai, and Mexico City.

== Description ==
ArchDaily is one of the most popular architecture websites worldwide, with 17.9 million monthly readers and about 283 million page views per month as of 2022.

Founded in March 2008 by Chilean architects David Basulto and David Assael, ArchDaily includes three regional websites in Spanish (Plataforma Arquitectura, ArchDaily México, ArchDaily Colombia, and ArchDaily Perú), Portuguese (ArchDaily Brasil), and Chinese (ArchDaily China). It has a partnership with the Pritzker Architecture Prize and was one of five finalists for the Best Online Magazine prize on Mashable's 2009 Open Web Awards.

In 2020, ArchDaily was acquired by Swiss media company NZZ Mediengruppe. Even though the purchase details have not officially been disclosed, estimations have put the price tag around €10 million.

== Staff and contributors ==
As of 2023, the site's Chief Executive Officer is Stephan Bachmann, the editor-in-chief is David Basulto, while Clara Ott serves as Projects Manager and Nicolás Valencia as Editorial Manager.

== Building of the Year Awards ==
Annually, ArchDaily organizes the Building of the Year Awards, with winners chosen by a vote of the 60,000 architects who are members of the site.
