= Sérgio Menezes =

Brazilian sprinter

Personal information
- Full name: Sérgio Mathias Franco de Menezes
- Born: 27 April 1965 (age 61) São Paulo, Brazil
- Height: 180 cm (5 ft 11 in)
- Weight: 78 kg (172 lb)

Sport
- Sport: Sprinting
- Events: 200 m, 400 m
- Club: ADECP
Medal record
Representing Brazil
Summer Universiade
Silver medal – second place	1989 Duisbrg	400m

Sérgio Mathias Franco de Menezes (born 27 April 1965) is a retired Brazilian sprinter.

== International competitions ==
Year	Competition	Venue	Position	Event	Notes
Representing Brazil
1983	South American Junior Championships	Medellín, Colombia	2nd	200 m	21.31
1983	South American Junior Championships	Medellín, Colombia	1st	400 m	47.13
1983	South American Junior Championships	Medellín, Colombia	1st	4 × 100 m relay	41.08
1983	South American Junior Championships	Medellín, Colombia	1st	4 × 400 m relay	3:14.72
1983	Ibero-American Championships	Barcelona, Spain	2nd	400 m	47.28
1983	Ibero-American Championships	Barcelona, Spain	3rd	4 × 100 m relay	41.00
1983	Ibero-American Championships	Barcelona, Spain	2nd	4 × 400 m relay	3:07.62
1983	South American Championships	Santa Fe, Argentina	1st	400 m	46.8
1983	South American Championships	Santa Fe, Argentina	1st	4 × 100 m relay	40.7
1983	South American Championships	Santa Fe, Argentina	1st	4 × 400 m relay	3:10.8
1984	South American Junior Championships	Caracas, Venezuela	2nd	4 × 100 m relay	41.67
1985	South American Championships	Santiago, Chile	3rd	200 m	21.47
1985	South American Championships	Santiago, Chile	2nd	400 m	46.53
1985	South American Championships	Santiago, Chile	1st	4 × 400 m relay	3:07.96
1987	Pan American Games	Indianapolis, United States	11th (sf)	400 m	47.30
1987	Pan American Games	Indianapolis, United States	4th	4 × 100 m relay	39.85
1987	Pan American Games	Indianapolis, United States	4th	4 × 400 m relay	3:08.21
1987	World Championships	Rome, Italy	19th (h)	4 × 400 m relay	3:05.64
1988	Ibero-American Championships	Mexico City, Mexico	3rd (h)	200 m	46.08^{1}
1988	Ibero-American Championships	Mexico City, Mexico	3rd (h)	4 × 100 m relay	39.20^{1}
1988	Olympic Games	Seoul, South Korea	–	400 m	DNF
1989	South American Championships	Medellín, Colombia	2nd	200 m	20.88
1989	South American Championships	Medellín, Colombia	1st	400 m	45.88
1989	Universiade	Duisburg, West Germany	19th (qf)	100 m	10.60
1989	Universiade	Duisburg, West Germany	2nd	400 m	45.66
1989	World Cup	Barcelona, Spain	6th	4 × 100 m relay	39.07
1989	World Cup	Barcelona, Spain	1st	4 × 400 m relay	3:00.65
1992	Ibero-American Championships	Seville, Spain	3rd	200 m	21.44
1992	Olympic Games	Barcelona, Spain	27th (qf)	200 m	21.00
1992	Olympic Games	Barcelona, Spain	4th	4 × 400 m relay	3:01.61

^{1}Disqualified in the final

== Personal bests ==
Outdoor

- 200 metres – 20.59 (+1.0 m/s, Americana 1992)
- 400 metres – 45.62 (São Paulo 1988)
