= Rita Slompo =

Brazilian long jumper

Personal information
- Full name: Rita Cristina Slompo
- Born: 25 March 1967 (age 58)

Sport
- Sport: Athletics
- Event(s): Long jump, triple jump

Rita Cristina Slompo (born 25 March 1967) is a retired Brazilian athlete who specialised in the long jump. She won three gold medals in the event at the South American Championships, in 1987, 1989 and 1991.

Her personal best in the long jump is 6.35 metres (0.2 m/s, Maringá 1992). In addition, her personal best in the triple jump is 13.30 metres (+0.5, Americana 1992).

== International competitions ==
Year	Competition	Venue	Position	Event	Notes
Representing Brazil
1985	South American Junior Championships	Santa Fe, Argentina	2nd	Long jump	5.58 m
1987	South American Championships	São Paulo, Brazil	1st	Long jump	6.17 m
1988	Ibero-American Championships	Mexico City, Mexico	8th	Long jump	5.79 m
1989	South American Championships	Medellín, Colombia	1st	Long jump	6.22 m
1991	South American Championships	Manaus, Brazil	1st	Long jump	5.94 m
1992	Ibero-American Championships	Seville, Spain	2nd	Triple jump	12.96 m
