= Henry Aguiar =

Venezuelan sprinter (born 1966)

Personal information
- Born: 15 August 1966 (age 59)

Sport
- Sport: Athletics
- Event: 400 metres

Henry Aguiar (born 15 August 1966) is a retired Venezuelan sprinter who specialised in the 400 metres. He won several medals at regional level.

His personal best in the event is 45.93 seconds set in Barquisimeto in 1994.

== International competitions ==
Year	Competition	Venue	Position	Event	Notes
Representing Venezuela
1985	Bolivarian Games	Cuenca, Ecuador	1st	400 m	48.99
1985	Bolivarian Games	Cuenca, Ecuador	2nd	4 × 400 m relay	3:20.9
1988	Ibero-American Championships	Mexico City, Mexico	11th (h)	400 m	47.14
1988	Ibero-American Championships	Mexico City, Mexico	2nd	4 × 400 m relay	3:04.56
1989	Bolivarian Games	Maracaibo, Venezuela	3rd	400 m	47.30
1989	South American Championships	Medellín, Colombia	6th	400 m	47.34
1989	South American Championships	Medellín, Colombia	1st	4 × 400 m relay	3:05.76
1990	Central American and Caribbean Games	Mexico City, Mexico	5th	400 m	46.21
1990	Central American and Caribbean Games	Mexico City, Mexico	3rd	4 × 100 m relay	40.65
1990	Central American and Caribbean Games	Mexico City, Mexico	5th	4 × 400 m relay	3:12.44
1991	South American Championships	Manaus, Brazil	3rd	400 m	47.02
1991	South American Championships	Manaus, Brazil	2nd	4 × 400 m relay	3:08.39
1992	Ibero-American Championships	Seville, Spain	3rd	400 m	46.29
1994	South American Games	Valencia, Venezuela	3rd	4 × 400 m relay	3:15.74
