= Roberto Bortolotto (athlete) =

Brazilian sprinter (born 1967)

Personal information
- Full name: Roberto Carlos Bortolotto
- Born: 7 April 1967 (age 58)

Sport
- Sport: Athletics
- Event: 400 meters

Roberto Carlos Bortolotto (born 7 April 1967) is a retired Brazilian sprinter who specialised in the 400 metres. He represented his country at one outdoor and one indoor World Championships.

His personal bests in the event are 45.91 seconds outdoors (São Paulo 1991) and 49.07 seconds indoors (Seville 1991).

== International competitions ==
Year	Competition	Venue	Position	Event	Notes
Representing Brazil
1989	South American Championships	Medellín, Colombia	3rd	400 m	46.38
1989	South American Championships	Medellín, Colombia	2nd	4 × 400 m relay	3:06.33
1990	Ibero-American Championships	Manaus, Brazil	3rd	400 m	47.33
1991	World Indoor Championships	Seville, Spain	16th (h)	400 m	49.07
1991	South American Championships	Manaus, Brazil	2nd	400 m	46.90
1991	South American Championships	Manaus, Brazil	1st	4 × 400 m relay	3:05.60
1991	Pan American Games	Havana, Cuba	13th (h)	400 m	47.22
1991	World Championships	Tokyo, Japan	38th (h)	400 m	47.44
