= Ana María Comaschi =

Argentine athlete (born 1966)

Personal information
- Born: 11 April 1966 (age 60) Necochea, Argentina

Sport
- Sport: Athletics
- Event: Heptathlon
Medal record
Representing Argentina
South American Games
Gold medal – first place	1986 Santiago	Heptatlon
Silver medal – second place	1982 Santa Fe	Heptathlon
Bronze medal – third place	1986 Santiago	Javelin throw

Ana María Comaschi (born 11 April 1966) is a retired Argentine athlete who competed primarily in the combined events as well as in some individual events. She represented her country in the heptathlon at the 1991 World Championships in Tokyo finishing 23rd.

== International competitions ==
Year	Competition	Venue	Position	Event	Notes
Representing Argentina
1982	Southern Cross Games	Santa Fe, Argentina	2nd	Heptathlon	4580 pts
1983	South American Junior Championships	Medellín, Colombia	3rd	Heptathlon	4955 pts
1983	South American Championships	Santa Fe, Argentina	5th	Heptathlon	4665 pts
1985	South American Championships	Santiago, Chile	1st	Heptathlon	4866 pts
1985	South American Junior Championships	Santa Fe, Argentina	1st	Heptathlon	4769 pts
1986	South American Games	Santiago, Chile	3rd	Javelin throw	33.52 m
1986	South American Games	Santiago, Chile	1st	Heptathlon	4686 pts
1989	South American Championships	Medellín, Colombia	6th (h)	200 m	24.14 s^{1}
1989	South American Championships	Medellín, Colombia	2nd	100 m hurdles	13.7 s
1989	South American Championships	Medellín, Colombia	3rd	Long jump	5.96 m
1989	South American Championships	Medellín, Colombia	–	Heptathlon	DNF
1990	Ibero-American Championships	Manaus, Brazil	4th	4 × 400 m relay	3:44.2 min
1990	Ibero-American Championships	Manaus, Brazil	2nd	Heptathlon	5517 pts
1991	Pan American Games	Havana, Cuba	5th	Heptathlon	5503 pts
1991	World Championships	Tokyo, Japan	23rd	Heptathlon	5617 pts
1992	Ibero-American Championships	Seville, Spain	2nd	Heptathlon	5795 pts
1995	Pan American Games	Mar del Plata, Argentina	8th	Shot put	13.33 m

^{1}Did not start in the final

== Personal bests ==
Outdoor

- 100 metres – 11.71 (+1.1 m/s, Buenos Aires 1989)
- 200 metres – 23.75 (+0.5 m/s, Manaus 1990)
- 400 metres – 52.99 (Madrid 1991)
- 800 metres – 2:13.88 (Seville 1992)
- 100 metres hurdles – 13.70 A (-1.0 m/s, Segovia 1990)
- 400 metres hurdles – 59.2 (Santa Fe 1992) former NR
- High jump – 1.65 (Buenos Aires 1989)
- Long jump – 6.02 (NWI, Santa Fe 1989)
- Triple jump – 12.13 (NWI, Mar del Plata 1992)
- Shot put – 14.05 (Santa Fe 1994)
- Javelin throw (old model) – 40.04 (Mar del Plata 1989)
- Heptathlon (old model) – 5795 (Seville 1992) former NR
