= Claudete Alves Pina =

Brazilian sprinter (born 1971)

Personal information
- Born: 18 April 1971 (age 54)

Sport
- Sport: Athletics
- Event(s): 100 metres, 200 meters

Claudete Alves Pina (born 18 April 1971) is a retired Brazilian sprinter. She represented her country at the 1991 World Championships in 100 and 200 metres advancing to the second round in both events.

== International competitions ==
Year	Competition	Venue	Position	Event	Notes
Representing Brazil
1989	South American Junior Championships	Montevideo, Uruguay	3rd	200 m	24.55
1989	South American Junior Championships	Montevideo, Uruguay	1st	400 m	54.89
1989	South American Junior Championships	Montevideo, Uruguay	1st	4 × 100 m relay	47.32
1989	South American Junior Championships	Montevideo, Uruguay	1st	4 × 400 m relay	3:40.7
1989	Pan American Junior Championships	Santa Fe, Argentina	4th	400 m	54.33
1989	Pan American Junior Championships	Santa Fe, Argentina	3rd	4 × 100 m relay	46.72
1989	Pan American Junior Championships	Santa Fe, Argentina	3rd	4 × 400 m relay	3:40.87
1989	South American Championships	Medellín, Colombia	4th	200 m	24.01
1989	South American Championships	Medellín, Colombia	3rd	400 m	54.26
1989	South American Championships	Medellín, Colombia	2nd	4 × 400 m relay	3:37.7
1990	South American Junior Championships	Bogota, Colombia	3rd	200 m	24.21
1990	South American Junior Championships	Bogota, Colombia	2nd	400 m	55.13
1990	South American Junior Championships	Bogota, Colombia	1st	4 × 100 m relay	47.07
1990	World Junior Championships	Plovdiv, Bulgaria	33rd (h)	200 m	25.58
1991	South American Championships	Manaus, Brazil	1st	100 m	11.84
1991	South American Championships	Manaus, Brazil	2nd	200 m	23.37
1991	Pan American Games	Havana, Cuba	7th	100 m	11.87
1991	Pan American Games	Havana, Cuba	8th	200 m	24.02
1991	World Championships	Tokyo, Japan	22nd (qf)	100 m	11.81
1991	World Championships	Tokyo, Japan	19th (qf)	200 m	23.80
1992	Ibero-American Championships	Seville, Spain	3rd	100 m	11.76
1992	Ibero-American Championships	Seville, Spain	3rd	200 m	24.37
1997	South American Championships	Mar del Plata, Argentina	5th	400 m	56.55
1997	South American Championships	Mar del Plata, Argentina	2nd	4 × 100 m relay	45.21
1997	South American Championships	Mar del Plata, Argentina	2nd	4 × 400 m relay	3:38.18
2000	Ibero-American Championships	Rio de Janeiro, Brazil	2nd	4 × 100 m relay	45.16
2000	Ibero-American Championships	Rio de Janeiro, Brazil	3rd	4 × 400 m relay	3:36.07
2002	Ibero-American Championships	Guatemala City, Guatemala	1st	4 × 400 m relay	3:33.13

== Personal bests ==
Outdoor

- 100 metres – 11.71 (+0.1 m/s, Tokyo 1991)
- 200 metres – 23.80 (+0.3 m/s, Tokyo 1991)
- 400 metres – 53.54 (Maringa 2002)
