= Adilson Oliveira =

Brazilian shotputter

Personal information
- Full name: Adilson Ramos de Souza Oliveira
- Born: 4 January 1964 (age 62)
- Height: 1.88 m (6 ft 2 in)
- Weight: 110 kg (243 lb)

Sport
- Sport: Athletics
- Event: Shot put
- Club: Cubatão

Adilson Ramos de Souza Oliveira (born 4 January 1964) is a retired Brazilian athlete specialising in the shot put. He won multiple medals on regional level.

His personal best in the event is 18.72 metres set in Rio de Janeiro in 1994.

== International competitions ==
Year	Competition	Venue	Position	Event	Notes
Representing Brazil
1981	South American Junior Championships	Rio de Janeiro, Brazil	1st	Shot put	15.81 m
1982	Pan American Junior Championships	Medellín, Colombia	4th	Shot put	15.60 m
1983	South American Junior Championships	Medellín, Colombia	1st	Shot put	18.11 m
1983	South American Championships	Santa Fe, Argentina	3rd	Shot put	15.70 m
1985	South American Championships	Santiago, Chile	2nd	Shot put	17.13 m
1986	Ibero-American Championships	Havana, Cuba	3rd	Shot put	18.02 m
1987	South American Championships	São Paulo, Brazil	2nd	Shot put	18.04 m
1988	Ibero-American Championships	Manaus, Brazil	3rd	Shot put	17.68 m
1989	South American Championships	Medellín, Colombia	2nd	Shot put	17.49 m
1990	Ibero-American Championships	Manaus, Brazil	2nd	Shot put	17.34 m
1991	South American Championships	Manaus, Brazil	2nd	Shot put	18.08 m
1992	Ibero-American Championships	Seville, Spain	3rd	Shot put	17.44 m
1993	South American Championships	Lima, Peru	1st	Shot put	17.88 m
1994	Ibero-American Championships	Mar del Plata, Argentina	3rd	Shot put	17.77 m
1995	South American Championships	Manaus, Brazil	3rd	Shot put	17.68 m
