= Jesús Malavé =

Venezuelan sprinter (1965–2026)

Personal information
- Full name: Jesús Rafael Malavé Paredes
- Born: 24 October 1965
- Died: 11 March 2026 (aged 60)

Sport
- Sport: Athletics
- Event(s): 200 metres, 400 metres

Jesús Rafael Malavé Paredes (24 October 1965 – 11 March 2026) was a Venezuelan sprinter who specialised in the 200 and 400 metres. He represented his country at the 1987 World Championships without advancing from the first round. Malavé died on 11 March 2026, at the age of 60.

== International competitions ==
Year	Competition	Venue	Position	Event	Notes
Representing Venezuela
1982	Central American and Caribbean; Junior Championships (U20)	Bridgetown, Barbados	–	4 × 400 m relay	DNF
1982	Pan American Junior Championships	Barquisimeto, Venezuela	7th	400 m	51.88
1983	South American Junior Championships	Medellín, Colombia	5th	200 m	22.24 (w)
1983	South American Junior Championships	Medellín, Colombia	3rd	400 m	48.01
1983	South American Junior Championships	Medellín, Colombia	4th	4 × 400 m relay	3:23.01
1983	Pan American Games	Caracas, Venezuela	5th	4 × 400 m relay	3:06.50
1983	South American Championships	Santa Fe, Argentina	4th	400 m	48.0
1984	Central American and Caribbean; Junior Championships (U20)	San Juan, Puerto Rico	5th	200 m	21.68 (w)
1984	Central American and Caribbean; Junior Championships (U20)	San Juan, Puerto Rico	3rd	4 × 400 m relay	3:14.14
1986	Central American and Caribbean Games	Santiago, Dominican Republic	6th	400 m	46.70
1987	Central American and Caribbean Championships	Caracas, Venezuela	2nd	400 m	45.68
1987	Central American and Caribbean Championships	Caracas, Venezuela	2nd	4 × 400 m relay	3:05.15
1987	Pan American Games	Indianapolis, United States	–	400 m	DQ
1987	Pan American Games	Indianapolis, United States	5th	4 × 400 m relay	3:08.63
1987	World Championships	Rome, Italy	38th (h)	400 m	47.10
1988	Ibero-American Championships	Mexico City, Mexico	3rd	400 m	45.61
1988	Ibero-American Championships	Mexico City, Mexico	2nd	4 × 400 m relay	3:04.56
1989	Bolivarian Games	Maracaibo, Venezuela	1st	200 m	21.10
1989	Bolivarian Games	Maracaibo, Venezuela	1st	400 m	46.69
1989	Bolivarian Games	Maracaibo, Venezuela	1st	4 × 100 m relay	40.66
1989	South American Championships	Medellín, Colombia	3rd	200 m	21.12
1989	South American Championships	Medellín, Colombia	4th	400 m	46.40
1989	South American Championships	Medellín, Colombia	1st	4 × 400 m relay	3:05.76
1991	South American Championships	Manaus, Brazil	3rd	200 m	21.18
1991	South American Championships	Manaus, Brazil	4th	4 × 100 m relay	42.05
1993	Bolivarian Games	Maracaibo, Venezuela	6th	200 m	21.63

== Personal bests ==
Outdoor

- 200 meters – 20.96 (Santiago 1988)
- 400 meters – 45.68 (Caracas 1987)
