= Gert Weil =

Chilean shot putter (born 1960)

Personal information
- Full name: Gert Michael Weil Wiesenborn
- Nationality: Chile
- Born: January 3, 1960 (age 66) Puerto Montt, Los Lagos
- Height: 1.97 m (6 ft 6 in)
- Weight: 122 kg (269 lb)

Sport
- Sport: Athletics
- Now coaching: Marco Antonio Verni
Medal record
Men's athletics
Representing Chile
Pan American Games
Gold medal – first place	1987 Indianapolis	Shot put
Gold medal – first place	1991 Havana	Shot put
Silver medal – second place	1983 Caracas	Shot put
Bronze medal – third place	1995 Mar del Plata	Shot put
South American Games
Gold medal – first place	1982 Santa Fe	Shot put
Gold medal – first place	1990 Lima	Shot put
Gold medal – first place	1994 Valencia	Shot put
Silver medal – second place	1982 Santa Fe	Discus throw
Bronze medal – third place	1982 Santa Fe	Hammer throw
South American Championships
Gold medal – first place	1979 Bucaramanga	Shot put
Gold medal – first place	1981 La Paz	Shot put
Gold medal – first place	1983 Santa Fe	Shot put
Gold medal – first place	1985 Santiago	Shot put
Gold medal – first place	1987 São Paulo	Shot put
Gold medal – first place	1989 Medellín	Shot put
Gold medal – first place	1991 Manaus	Shot put
Gold medal – first place	1995 Manaus	Shot put
Bronze medal – third place	1989 Medellín	Discus throw
- Updated on 8 May 2013

Gert Michael Weil Wiesenborn (born January 3, 1960, in Puerto Montt) is a retired Chilean shot putter of German ancestry, who dominated the sport on the South American scene during the 1980s and early 1990s.

His best performance at a global event was a sixth place at the 1988 Olympic Games. His personal best was 20.90, achieved in Wirges 1986.

Weil is married to Colombian Olympic medalist Ximena Restrepo. Their daughter, Martina Weil, is also an accomplished track and field athlete.

== International competitions ==
Year	Competition	Venue	Position	Event	Notes
Representing Chile
1976	South American Youth Championships	Santiago, Chile	1st	Shot put	15.73 m
1978	South American Junior Championships	São Paulo, Brazil	1st	Shot put	16.50 m
1979	Pan American Games	San Juan, Puerto Rico	10th	Shot put	15.06 m
1979	Pan American Games	San Juan, Puerto Rico	7th	Discus throw	43.24 m
1979	South American Championships	Bucaramanga, Colombia	1st	Shot put	16.42 m
1980	Liberty Bell Classic	Philadelphia, United States	3rd	Shot put	16.17 m
1981	South American Championships	La Paz, Bolivia	1st	Shot put	17.48 m
1982	Southern Cross Games	Santa Fe, Argentina	1st	Shot put	17.37 m
1982	Southern Cross Games	Santa Fe, Argentina	2nd	Discus throw	47.90 m
1982	Southern Cross Games	Santa Fe, Argentina	3rd	Hammer throw	35.08 m
1983	Pan American Games	Caracas, Venezuela	2nd	Shot put	17.30 m
1983	South American Championships	Santa Fe, Argentina	1st	Shot put	18.29 m
1983	South American Championships	Santa Fe, Argentina	5th	Discus throw	48.56 m
1984	Olympic Games	Los Angeles, United States	10th	Shot put	18.69 m
1985	World Indoor Games	Paris, France	7th	Shot put	19.47 m
1985	South American Championships	Santiago, Chile	1st	Shot put	20.14 m
1985	South American Championships	Santiago, Chile	5th	Discus throw	50.52 m
1986	Ibero-American Championships	Havana, Cuba	1st	Shot put	19.82 m
1987	World Indoor Championships	Indianapolis, United States	9th	Shot put	18.90 m
1987	Pan American Games	Indianapolis, United States	1st	Shot put	20.21 m
1987	World Championships	Rome, Italy	10th	Shot put	19.71 m
1987	South American Championships	São Paulo, Brazil	1st	Shot put	19.35 m
1987	South American Championships	São Paulo, Brazil	4th	Discus throw	50.66 m
1988	Olympic Games	Seoul, South Korea	6th	Shot put	20.38 m
1989	World Indoor Championships	Budapest, Hungary	6th	Shot put	19.91 m
1989	South American Championships	Medellín, Colombia	1st	Shot put	19.98 m
1989	South American Championships	Medellín, Colombia	3rd	Discus throw	52.36 m
1990	Ibero-American Championships	Manaus, Brazil	1st	Shot put	19.58 m
1990	South American Games	Lima, Peru	1st	Shot put	18.32 m
1991	World Indoor Championships	Seville, Spain	6th	Shot put	19.56 m
1991	South American Championships	Manaus, Brazil	1st	Shot put	18.37 m
1991	Pan American Games	Havana, Cuba	1st	Shot put	19.47 m
1991	World Championships	Tokyo, Japan	9th	Shot put	19.30 m
1992	Ibero-American Championships	Seville, Spain	1st	Shot put	18.94 m
1992	Olympic Games	Barcelona, Spain	13th (q)	Shot put	19.41 m
1993	World Championships	Stuttgart, Germany	6th	Shot put	19.95 m
1994	Ibero-American Championships	Mar del Plata, Argentina	1st	Shot put	19.30 m
1994	South American Games	Valencia, Venezuela	1st	Shot put	18.74 m
1995	Pan American Games	Mar del Plata, Argentina	3rd	Shot put	18.71 m
1995	South American Championships	Manaus, Brazil	1st	Shot put	19.02 m
1996	Ibero-American Championships	Medellín, Colombia	1st	Shot put	19.67 m
1996	Olympic Games	Atlanta, United States	22nd (q)	Shot put	18.67 m
