= José María Beduino =

Argentine sprinter

Personal information
- Born: 28 September 1965 (age 60)

Sport
- Sport: Athletics
- Event(s): 100 m, 200 m, 400 m

José María Beduino (born 28 September 1965) is a retired Argentinian sprinter. He won several medals at regional level. In addition, he was a four-time national champion in the 200 and 400 metres.

== International competitions ==
Year	Competition	Venue	Position	Event	Notes
Representing Argentina
1983	South American Junior Championships	Medellín, Colombia	5th	100 m	10.87
1983	South American Junior Championships	Medellín, Colombia	2nd	4 × 100 m relay	41.71
1983	South American Championships	Santa Fe, Argentina	3rd	200 m	21.7
1983	South American Championships	Santa Fe, Argentina	2nd	4 × 100 m relay	40.8
1985	South American Championships	Santiago, Chile	5th	400 m	47.27
1985	South American Championships	Santiago, Chile	4th	4 × 100 m relay	41.17
1985	South American Championships	Santiago, Chile	2nd	4 × 400 m relay	3:10.21
1986	Ibero-American Championships	Havana, Cuba	8th	200 m	21.73
1986	Ibero-American Championships	Havana, Cuba	4th	400 m	47.57
1986	South American Games	Santiago, Chile	2nd	4 × 400 m relay	3:12.95
1987	World Championships	Rome, Italy	22nd (h)	4 × 400 m relay	3:12.96
1987	South American Championships	São Paulo, Brazil	4th	400 m	46.78
1987	South American Championships	São Paulo, Brazil	2nd	4 × 100 m relay	40.72
1987	South American Championships	São Paulo, Brazil	3rd	4 × 400 m relay	3:10.36
1988	Ibero-American Championships	Mexico City, Mexico	9th (h)	200 m	21.31
1988	Ibero-American Championships	Mexico City, Mexico	12th (h)	400 m	47.16
1991	South American Championships	Manaus, Brazil	6th	100 m	10.72
1991	South American Championships	Manaus, Brazil	5th	200 m	21.22
1991	South American Championships	Manaus, Brazil	3rd	4 × 100 m relay	41.22
1991	South American Championships	Manaus, Brazil	3rd	4 × 400 m relay	3:11.10
1992	Ibero-American Championships	Seville, Spain	16th (h)	100 m	10.94
1992	Ibero-American Championships	Seville, Spain	6th	4 × 100 m relay	41.46
1992	Ibero-American Championships	Seville, Spain	8th	4 × 400 m relay	3:15.00

== Personal bests ==
Outdoor

- 100 metres – 10.70 (Santiago 1989)
- 200 metres – 21.22 (+0.5 m/s, Manaus 1991)
- 400 metres – 46.78 (São Paulo 1987) former NR

Indoor

- 400 metres – 48.58 (Piraeus 1987)
