= Pedro Chiamulera =

Brazilian hurdler

Personal information
- Nationality: Brazilian
- Born: 29 June 1964 (age 62) Curitiba, Brazil
- Height: 1.90 m (6 ft 3 in)
- Weight: 77 kg (170 lb)

Sport
- Sport: Track and field
- Events: 110 metres hurdles, 400 metres hurdles
- Club: Reebok/Funilense Cosmópolis

Pedro Paulo Chiamulera (born 29 June 1964) is a retired Brazilian track and field athlete who competed in the 100-metre and 400-metre hurdles. He represented his country at the 1992 and 1996 Summer Olympics, as well as five consecutive world championships starting in 1987.

Since retiring from Olympic competition, Chiamulera now acts as the head of the fraud management company ClearSale, which he started in 2001.

== Competition record ==
Year	Competition	Venue	Position	Event	Notes
Representing Brazil
1981	South American Junior Championships	Rio de Janeiro, Brazil	2nd	110 m hurdles	14.7
1981	South American Junior Championships	Rio de Janeiro, Brazil	4th	400 m hurdles	54.4
1983	South American Junior Championships	Medellín, Colombia	1st	110 m hurdles	15.21 (A)
1983	South American Junior Championships	Medellín, Colombia	2nd	400 m hurdles	55.02 (A)
1983	South American Championships	Santa Fe, Argentina	1st	110 m hurdles	14.3
1983	South American Championships	Santa Fe, Argentina	1st	400 m hurdles	52.2
1985	South American Championships	Santiago, Chile	1st	110 m hurdles	13.87
1985	South American Championships	Santiago, Chile	1st	400 m hurdles	49.71
1985	South American Championships	Santiago, Chile	1st	4 × 400 m relay	3:07.96
1985	Universiade	Kobe, Japan	8th	110 m hurdles	14.75
1985	Universiade	Kobe, Japan	6th	400 m hurdles	50.54
1985	Universiade	Kobe, Japan	9th (h)	4 × 100 m relay	40.22
1985	World Cup	Canberra, Australia	7th	400 m hurdles	51.44^{1}
1987	Pan American Games	Indianapolis, United States	9th (h)	400 m hurdles	51.10
1987	Pan American Games	Indianapolis, United States	4th	4 × 400 m relay	3:08.21
1987	World Championships	Rome, Italy	31st (h)	400 m hurdles	50.71
1989	South American Championships	Medellín, Colombia	1st	110 m hurdles	14.1 (A)
1989	South American Championships	Medellín, Colombia	1st	400 m hurdles	50.12 (A)
1989	South American Championships	Medellín, Colombia	2nd	4 × 400 m relay	3:06.33
1991	World Championships	Tokyo, Japan	14th (sf)	400 m hurdles	50.02
1992	Olympic Games	Barcelona, Spain	–	400 m hurdles	DNF
1993	South American Championships	Lima, Peru	1st	110 m hurdles	14.30
1993	South American Championships	Lima, Peru	2nd	400 m hurdles	50.10
1993	South American Championships	Lima, Peru	1st	4 × 400 m relay	3:09.0
1993	World Championships	Stuttgart, Germany	37th (h)	110 m hurdles	14.11
1995	World Championships	Gothenburg, Sweden	47th (h)	110 m hurdles	14.33
1996	Ibero-American Championships	Medellín, Colombia	2nd	110 m hurdles	13.58
1996	Olympic Games	Atlanta, United States	27th (qf)	110 m hurdles	13.77
1997	World Indoor Championships	Paris, France	26th (h)	60 m hurdles	7.96
1997	World Championships	Athens, Greece	29th (qf)	110 m hurdles	13.86

^{1}Representing the Americas

== Personal bests ==
Outdoor

- 110-metre hurdles – 13.54 (+0.3) (Marietta 1996)
- 400-metre hurdles – 49.34 (San Juan 1985)

Indoor

- 60-metre hurdles – 7.96 (Paris 1997)
