= Zorobabelia Córdoba =

Personal information
- Full name: Zorobabelia Abad Córdoba Cuero
- Born: 28 March 1968 (age 58) Chocó Department, Colombia

Sport
- Sport: Athletics
- Event: Heptathlon
Medal record
Representing Colombia
Central American and Caribbean Games
Gold medal – first place	1990 Mexico City	Heptathlon
Bronze medal – third place	1993 Ponce	Heptathlon
South American Games
Gold medal – first place	1994 Valencia	Heptathlon
Gold medal – first place	1998 Cuenca	Heptathlon
Gold medal – first place	1998 Cuenca	Shot put
Silver medal – second place	1994 Valencia	100m hurdles

Zorobabelia Abad Córdoba Cuero (born 28 March 1968) is a retired Colombian athlete who competed primarily in the heptathlon. She won multiple medals on regional level.

Her personal best in the heptathlon is 5808 points set in Seville in 1992 which is a former national record.

Her father Juan Evangelista Córdoba was a boxer.

== International competitions ==
Year	Competition	Venue	Position	Event	Notes
Representing Colombia
1984	South American Youth Championships	Tarija, Bolivia	2nd	Javelin throw	34.36 m
1989	Bolivarian Games	Maracaibo, Venezuela	3rd	Javelin throw	45.94 m
1989	Bolivarian Games	Maracaibo, Venezuela	2nd	Heptathlon	4724 pts
1989	South American Championships	Medellín, Colombia	5th	Long jump	5.75 m
1989	South American Championships	Medellín, Colombia	2nd	Heptathlon	5436 pts
1990	Ibero-American Championships	Manaus, Brazil	2nd	Javelin throw	44.10 m
1990	Ibero-American Championships	Manaus, Brazil	3rd	Heptathlon	5091 pts
1990	Central American and Caribbean Games	Mexico City, Mexico	1st	Heptathlon	5647 pts
1991	South American Championships	Manaus, Brazil	1st	Heptathlon	5564 pts
1992	Ibero-American Championships	Seville, Spain	3rd	4 × 100 m relay	45.54 s
1992	Ibero-American Championships	Seville, Spain	1st	Heptathlon	5808 pts
1993	Bolivarian Games	Cochabamba, Bolivia	2nd	Long jump	5.85 m
1993	Bolivarian Games	Cochabamba, Bolivia	1st	Heptathlon	5110 pts
1993	South American Championships	Lima, Peru	2nd	Javelin throw	48.74 m
1993	South American Championships	Lima, Peru	1st	Heptathlon	5410 pts
1993	Central American and Caribbean Championships	Cali, Colombia	3rd	Heptathlon	5251 pts
1993	Central American and Caribbean Games	Ponce, Puerto Rico	3rd	Heptathlon	5326 pts
1994	Ibero-American Championships	Mar del Plata, Argentina	9th	Javelin throw	44.58 m
1994	Ibero-American Championships	Mar del Plata, Argentina	2nd	Heptathlon	5234 pts
1994	South American Games	Valencia, Venezuela	2nd	100 m hurdles	14.63 s
1994	South American Games	Valencia, Venezuela	1st	Heptathlon	5448 pts
1995	South American Championships	Manaus, Brazil	3rd	Javelin throw	51.82 m
1995	South American Championships	Manaus, Brazil	1st	Heptathlon	5495 pts
1995	Central American and Caribbean Championships	Guatemala City, Guatemala	3rd	Javelin throw	46.80 m
1995	Central American and Caribbean Championships	Guatemala City, Guatemala	3rd	Heptathlon	5151 pts
1996	Ibero-American Championships	Medellín, Colombia	3rd	Heptathlon	5165 pts (w)
1997	South American Championships	Mar del Plata, Argentina	4th	Shot put	12.71 m
1997	South American Championships	Mar del Plata, Argentina	2nd	Heptathlon	5428 pts
1997	Central American and Caribbean Championships	San Juan, Puerto Rico	1st	Heptathlon	5503 pts
1997	Bolivarian Games	Arequipa, Peru	1st	Heptathlon	5275 pts
1998	Ibero-American Championships	Lisbon, Portugal	3rd	Heptathlon	5551 pts
1998	Central American and Caribbean Games	Maracaibo, Venezuela	7th	Heptathlon	4781 pts
1998	South American Games	Cuenca, Ecuador	1st	Shot put	13.92 m
1998	South American Games	Cuenca, Ecuador	1st	Heptathlon	4868 pts
2001	Bolivarian Games	Ambato, Ecuador	1st	Heptathlon	5436 pts
