= Sandra Antelo =

Bolivian sprinter (born 1968)

Personal information
- Nationality: Bolivian
- Born: 20 September 1968 (age 57)

Sport
- Sport: Sprinting
- Event: 4 × 400 metres relay

Sandra Patricia Antelo Moreno (born 20 September 1968) is a Bolivian sprinter. She competed in the women's 4 × 400 metres relay at the 1992 Summer Olympics.
