= Nicolás Valencia =

Chilean-Colombian footballer

Personal information
- Full name: Nicolás Anelka Valencia Jiménez
- Date of birth: 26 May 2001 (age 25)
- Place of birth: Valparaíso, Chile
- Height: 1.75 m (5 ft 9 in)
- Position: Midfielder

Team information
- Current team: Unión Española
- Number: 28

Youth career
- Orsomarso

Senior career*
Years	Team	Apps	(Gls)
2022–2023	Orsomarso	6	(0)
2025–2026	Boyacá Chicó	23	(1)
2026–	Unión Española	0	(0)
- * Club domestic league appearances and goals as of 21 July 2026

Nicolás Anelka Valencia Jiménez (born 26 May 2001) is a Chilean-Colombian professional footballer who plays as a midfielder for Chilean club Unión Española.

== Career ==
Born in Valparaíso, Chile, Valencia started his career with Colombian club Orsomarso. He made his professional debut in the 0–0 draw against Real Santander on 20 August 2022.

In 2025, Valencia joined Boyacá Chicó in the Categoría Primera A and scored his first goal in the 5–0 home victory against Jaguares de Córdoba on 12 February 2026.

In July 2026, Valencia moved to his country of birth and joined Unión Española.

== Personal life ==
He is the son of former Colombia international footballer Manuel Valencia and the younger brother of midfielder Jhojan Valencia.

He was born in Valparaíso, Chile, when his father played for Santiago Wanderers, and holds dual Chilean-Colombian nationality.

He was named Nicolás Anelka after the French footballer Nicolas Anelka.
