= Ediélson Tenório =

Brazilian sprinter

Personal information
- Full name: Ediélson Rocha Tenório
- Born: 14 January 1967 (age 59) Rio de Janeiro, Brazil
- Height: 1.96 m (6 ft 5 in)
- Weight: 77 kg (170 lb)

Sport
- Sport: Sprinting
- Event: 400 metres

Ediélson Rocha Tenório (born 14 January 1967) is a Brazilian sprinter. He competed in the men's 400 metres at the 1992 Summer Olympics.

His personal best in the event is 45.81 seconds set in São Paulo in 1992.
