= Florencio Aguilar =

Panamanian sprinter (born 1959)

Personal information
- Born: 31 July 1959 (age 66)

Sport
- Sport: Track and field

Florencio Aguilar Mejia (born 31 July 1959) is a former Panamanian sprinter who competed in the men's 100m competition at the 1992 Summer Olympics. He recorded a 10.89, not enough to qualify for the next round past the heats. His personal best is 10.20, set in 1982. In the 1984 Summer Olympics, he competed in the 200m contest, running a 21.50.
