= Margarita Martirena =

Uruguayan sprinter

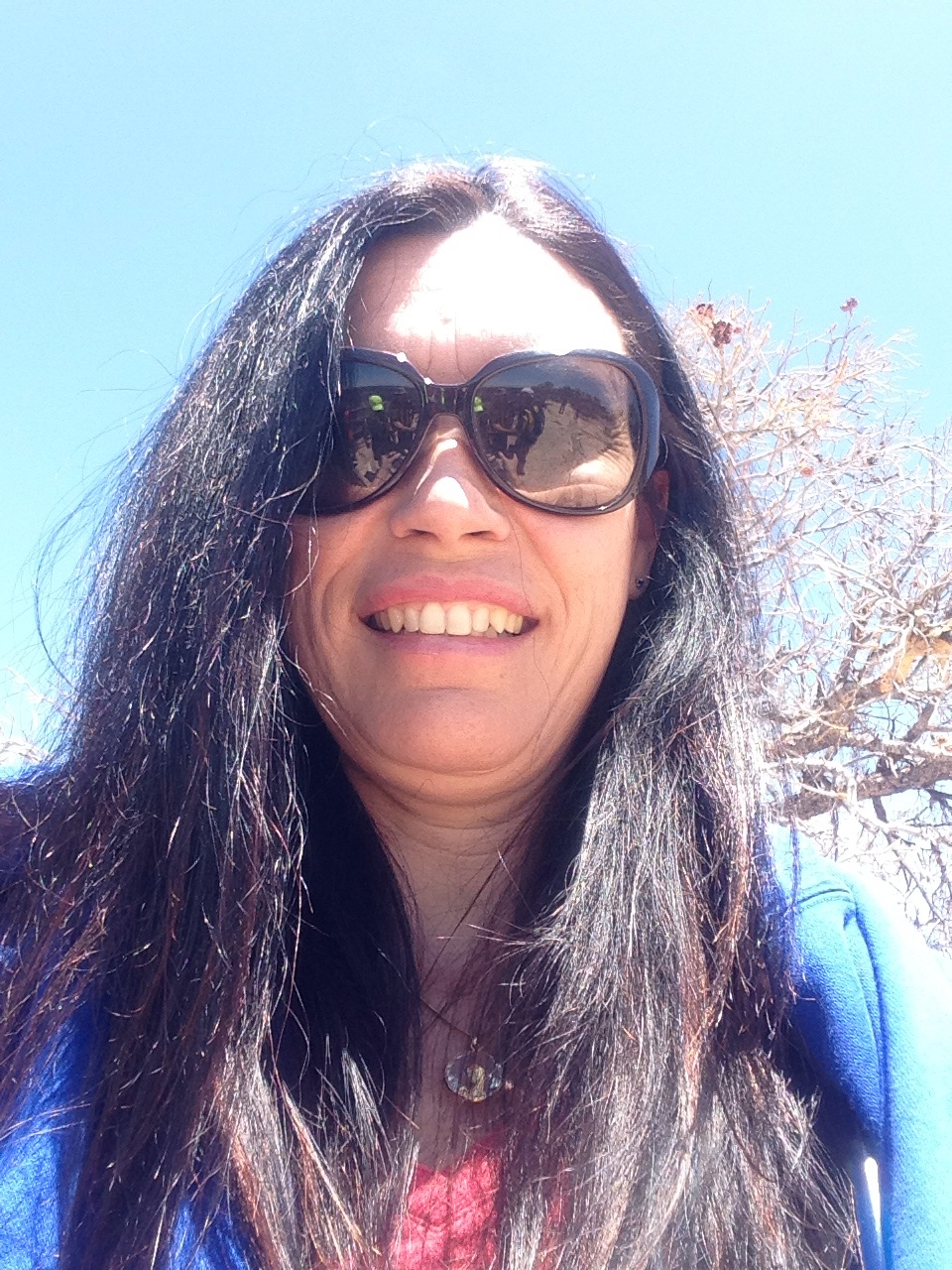

Personal information
- Born: 6 June 1966 (age 60) Durazno, Uruguay

Sport
- Sport: Track and field
Medal record
Representing Uruguay
South American Games
Gold medal – first place	1986 Santiago	4x100m relay

Margarita Emilia Martirena Cal (born 6 June 1966) is a retired Uruguayan sprinter from 1982 until 1992. She was a South American champion and holds the Uruguayan record in the 4 × 100 metres relay and the 100 metres.

== Early years ==
Martirena was the daughter of an entrepreneur. She studied at the Liceo Rubino. She moved to Montevideo in 1985 to study medicine at the University of the Republic and to train in track.

== Career ==
She began running for Sporting Club Uruguay in 1982 and then for Defensor Sporting after the two clubs merged in 1989. Her first international competition was in Caracas in 1984, where she and her team received a silver medal in the 4 × 400 relay and a bronze medal in the 4 × 100, breaking national and South American youth records in both. Then in Santa Fe, Argentina, she emerged as South American youth champion in the 4 × 100 and 4 × 400 relays. In 1986 she was champion in the 4 × 100 and 4 × 400 relays at the ODESUR games in Santiago. She also competed at the Ibero-American Championships in Athletics in Seville in 1990, and came in third in the 4 × 100 relay, breaking the Uruguayan all-time record in relay. She also broke the all-time Uruguayan record in the 100 meter dash in Montevideo with a time of 11.7 seconds. She competed in the Pan American Games in Indianapolis in 1987 and in Havana in 1991.

== Personal life ==
Martirena retired from track in 1992. She received her Doctor of Medicine degree in 1993 and specialized in anesthesia. She married in 1995 and, in 1998, emigrated to the United States. She joined Baylor College of Medicine as an anesthesiologist. She is now an anesthesiologist at The Methodist Hospital in Houston, Texas.
