= Amparo Caicedo =

Colombian sprinter (born 1965)

Personal information
- Full name: Amparo Caicedo Mina
- Nationality: Colombian
- Born: 30 January 1965 (age 61)
- Height: 1.67 m (5 ft 6 in)
- Weight: 50 kg (110 lb)

Sport
- Sport: Sprinting
- Event: 100 metres

Amparo Caicedo Mina (born 30 January 1965) is a Colombian sprinter. She competed in the women's 100 metres at the 1988 Summer Olympics. She set a national university record of 11.51 seconds in the 100m that stood until 2025. She also was a bronze and silver medalist at the 1986 Central American and Caribbean Games. Amparo Caicedo competed at the 1989 American Cup in Bogotà 100 m silver medal 11.20. 1989 Bolivarian Games Maracaibo 100m 11.4 gold medal , 200 m gold medal 23.4. 1990 Memorial Franki Colon 100 m gold medal 11.31 and 200 gold medal 23.7. South American Championship 1989 100 m gold medal and 200 m bronze medal. 1989 Central American Championship 100m gold medal and 200 m bronze medal. Also, she represented Colombia 1987 at the World Championship Athletics in Rome (100m) and 1987 Pan American Games in Indianapolis USA 100 and 200 m. 1983 South America Junior Championship Medellin, Colombia 100m gold medal and 200m bronze medal.

Anparo lives in USA
