= Arnaldo da Silva =

Brazilian athlete (born 1964)

Personal information
- Born: 26 March 1964 (age 62) Rio de Janeiro, Brazil

Sport
- Sport: Track and field
Medal record
Men's Athletics
Representing Brazil
Olympic Games
Bronze medal – third place	1996 Atlanta	4 x 100 m relay

Arnaldo de Oliveira da Silva (born 26 March 1964) is a former Brazilian athlete who competed mainly in the 100 metres. He is a four-time Olympian (1984, 1988, 1992 and 1996).

He competed for Brazil at the 1996 Summer Olympics held in Atlanta, United States, where he won the bronze medal in the men's 4 x 100 metre relay with his teammates Robson da Silva, Edson Ribeiro and André da Silva.
