= 1995 South American Championships in Athletics – Results =

These are the results of the 1995 South American Championships in Athletics which took place at the Vila Olímpica de Manaus in Manaus, Brazil, on 26, 27 and 28 May.

== Men's results ==
=== 100 metres ===
Heats – 26 May
Wind:
Heat 1: -0.6 m/s, Heat 2: +0.4 m/s

Rank	Heat	Name	Nationality	Time	Notes
1	1	Édson Ribeiro	Brazil	10.52	Q
2	1	Carlos Gats	Argentina	10.55	Q
3	2	Robson da Silva	Brazil	10.58	Q
4	1	Robinson Urrutia	Colombia	10.65	Q
5	1	Pablo Almeida	Chile	10.80	q
5	2	John Mena	Colombia	10.80	Q
7	2	Jorge Polanco	Argentina	10.82	Q
8	2	Javier Verme	Peru	10.92	q
9	1	Fernando Espinosa	Ecuador	10.99	
10	2	Alexis Recioy	Uruguay	11.05	
11	2	Juan Francisco Cobo-Estévez	Chile	11.26	
12	1	Alejandro Aponte	Bolivia	11.31	

Final – 26 May

Wind: +0.2 m/s

Rank	Name	Nationality	Time	Notes
1st place, gold medalist(s)	Robson da Silva	Brazil	10.29	
2nd place, silver medalist(s)	Édson Ribeiro	Brazil	10.30	
3rd place, bronze medalist(s)	Carlos Gats	Argentina	10.51	
4	Jorge Polanco	Argentina	10.57	
5	Robinson Urrutia	Colombia	10.61	
6	John Mena	Colombia	10.63	
7	Javier Verme	Peru	10.72	
8	Pablo Almeida	Chile	10.76	

=== 200 metres ===
Heats – 28 May
Wind:
Heat 1: +0.8 m/s, Heat 2: +0.6 m/s

Rank	Heat	Name	Nationality	Time	Notes
1	1	Robson da Silva	Brazil	20.9	Q
2	1	Ricardo Roach	Chile	21.3	Q
3	1	Luis Alfonso Vega	Colombia	21.4	Q
4	1	Cristián Vitasse	Argentina	21.6	q
5	1	Alexis Recioy	Uruguay	21.9	
6	1	Dick Perlaza	Ecuador	21.9	
7	1	Alejandro Aponte	Bolivia	22.0	
1	2	Claudinei da Silva	Brazil	20.96	Q
2	2	Carlos Gats	Argentina	21.46	Q
3	2	Wenceslao Ferrín	Colombia	21.53	Q
4	2	Javier Verme	Peru	21.64	q
5	2	Pablo Almeida	Chile	21.89	

Final – 28 May

Wind: +1.2 m/s

Rank	Name	Nationality	Time	Notes
1st place, gold medalist(s)	Robson da Silva	Brazil	20.54	
2nd place, silver medalist(s)	Claudinei da Silva	Brazil	20.68	
3rd place, bronze medalist(s)	Carlos Gats	Argentina	20.90	
4	Ricardo Roach	Chile	21.35	
5	Wenceslao Ferrín	Colombia	21.39	
6	Javier Verme	Peru	21.43	
7	Luis Alfonso Vega	Colombia	21.59	
8	Cristián Vitasse	Argentina	21.80	

=== 400 metres ===
Heats – 27 May

Rank	Heat	Name	Nationality	Time	Notes
1	1	Sanderlei Parrela	Brazil	46.98	Q
2	1	Wenceslao Ferrín	Colombia	47.24	Q
3	1	Ricardo Roach	Chile	48.18	Q
4	2	Inaldo Sena	Brazil	48.44	Q
5	1	Tommy Asinga	Suriname	48.53	q
6	1	Guillermo Cacián	Argentina	49.11	q
7	2	Carlos Morales	Chile	49.20	Q
8	2	Dick Perlaza	Ecuador	50.06	Q
9	2	Alfredo Peredo	Bolivia	50.70	

Final – 27 May

Rank	Name	Nationality	Time	Notes
1st place, gold medalist(s)	Sanderlei Parrela	Brazil	45.74	CR
2nd place, silver medalist(s)	Inaldo Sena	Brazil	45.88	
3rd place, bronze medalist(s)	Wenceslao Ferrín	Colombia	46.33	
4	Ricardo Roach	Chile	47.33	
5	Carlos Morales	Chile	47.69	
6	Guillermo Cacián	Argentina	48.38	
7	Tommy Asinga	Suriname	48.81	
8	Dick Perlaza	Ecuador	50.16	

=== 800 metres ===
26 May

Rank	Name	Nationality	Time	Notes
1st place, gold medalist(s)	José Luiz Barbosa	Brazil	1:46.16	CR
	Joaquim Cruz*	Brazil	1:47.19	
2nd place, silver medalist(s)	José Carlos de Oliveira	Brazil	1:48.88	
3rd place, bronze medalist(s)	Pablo Squella	Chile	1:49.80	
4	Tommy Asinga	Suriname	1:50.49	
5	Víctor Matarresse	Argentina	1:51.88	
6	Carlos López	Argentina	1:55.32	
7	Gabriel Umpiérrez	Uruguay	1:56.58	

=== 1500 metres ===
28 May

Rank	Name	Nationality	Time	Notes
1st place, gold medalist(s)	Edgar de Oliveira	Brazil	3:38.81	CR
	José Valente*	Brazil	3:39.34	
2nd place, silver medalist(s)	José Carlos de Oliveira	Brazil	3:41.73	
	João N'Tyamba*	Angola	3:42.80	
3rd place, bronze medalist(s)	Jacinto Navarrete	Colombia	3:44.27	
4	Desmond Hector	Guyana	3:49.10	
5	Said Gomez	Panama	3:51.69	
6	Mauricio Díaz	Chile	3:51.83	
7	Pablo Ramírez	Ecuador	3:52.53	
8	Gabriel Umpiérrez	Uruguay	3:55.06	
9	Giovanny Morejón	Bolivia	3:57.41	
10	Mariano Tarilo	Argentina	3:58.17	

=== 5000 metres ===
26 May

Rank	Name	Nationality	Time	Notes
1st place, gold medalist(s)	Ronaldo da Costa	Brazil	13:51.66	CR
2nd place, silver medalist(s)	Elenilson da Silva	Brazil	14:04.97	
3rd place, bronze medalist(s)	Jacinto Navarrete	Colombia	14:07.63	
4	Daniel Castro	Argentina	14:15.03	
5	Oscar Amaya	Argentina	14:17.77	
6	Marcelo Barrientos	Chile	14:21.20	
7	Mauricio Díaz	Chile	14:28.68	
8	Said Gomez	Panama	14:37.13	
9	William Roldán	Colombia	14:41.94	

=== 10,000 metres ===
28 May

Rank	Name	Nationality	Time	Notes
1st place, gold medalist(s)	Sérgio da Silva	Brazil	29:10.73	
2nd place, silver medalist(s)	César Troncoso	Argentina	30:24.29	
3rd place, bronze medalist(s)	Waldemar Cotelo	Uruguay	30:43.66	
4	Doval da Silva	Brazil	31:05.80	
5	William Roldán	Colombia	31:41.20	
6	Marcelo Barrientos	Chile	32:26.47	

=== 110 metres hurdles ===
27 May
Wind: -0.7 m/s

Rank	Name	Nationality	Time	Notes
1st place, gold medalist(s)	Joilto Bonfim	Brazil	13.92	
2nd place, silver medalist(s)	Arturo Rodríguez	Chile	14.42	
3rd place, bronze medalist(s)	Oscar Ratto	Argentina	14.60	
4	Diego Mur	Argentina	14.83	
5	Omar Triviño	Ecuador	15.30	
	Luiz André Balcers	Brazil	DQ	

=== 400 metres hurdles ===
26 May

Rank	Name	Nationality	Time	Notes
1st place, gold medalist(s)	Eronilde de Araújo	Brazil	48.63	CR
2nd place, silver medalist(s)	Llimy Rivas	Colombia	50.37	
3rd place, bronze medalist(s)	Francisco Carlos de Lima	Brazil	52.19	
4	Miguel Pérez	Argentina	52.29	
5	Ignacio Navarro	Bolivia	54.71	

=== 3000 metres steeplechase ===
27 May

Rank	Name	Nationality	Time	Notes
1st place, gold medalist(s)	Clodoaldo do Carmo	Brazil	8:56.87	
2nd place, silver medalist(s)	Eduardo do Nascimento	Brazil	8:57.81	
3rd place, bronze medalist(s)	Antonio Soliz	Argentina	9:04.26	
4	Pablo Ramírez	Ecuador	9:04.92	

=== 4 × 100 metres relay ===
27 May

Rank	Nation	Competitors	Time	Notes
1st place, gold medalist(s)	Brazil	Édson Ribeiro, Marcelo Brivilatti da Silva, Arnaldo da Silva, Robson da Silva	39.42	CR
2nd place, silver medalist(s)	Colombia	Robinson Urrutia, John Mena, Luis Alfonso Vega, Wenceslao Ferrín	40.31	
3rd place, bronze medalist(s)	Argentina	Jorge Polanco, Cristian Vitasse, Guillermo Cacián, Carlos Gats	40.78	
4	Chile	Pablo Almeida, Ricardo Roach, Carlos Morales, Juan Francisco Cobo	41.38	

=== 4 × 400 metres relay ===
28 May

Rank	Nation	Competitors	Time	Notes
1st place, gold medalist(s)	Brazil	Osmar dos Santos, Eronilde de Araújo, Inaldo Sena, Sanderlei Parrela	3:04.93	CR
2nd place, silver medalist(s)	Colombia	Robinson Urrutia, Luis Alfonso Vega, Llimy Rivas, Wenceslao Ferrín	3:10.16	
3rd place, bronze medalist(s)	Chile	Carlos Morales, Pablo Squella, Juan Francisco Cobo, Ricardo Roach	3:11.83	
4	Argentina	Miguel Pérez, Víctor Matarrese, Carlos López, Guillermo Cacián	3:12.76	

=== 20,000 metres walk ===
26 May

Rank	Name	Nationality	Time	Notes
1st place, gold medalist(s)	Querubín Moreno	Colombia	1:28:57.3	CR
2nd place, silver medalist(s)	Héctor Moreno	Colombia	1:31:03.9	
3rd place, bronze medalist(s)	Adhemar Kammler	Brazil	1:32:17.9	
4	Freddy Choque	Bolivia	1:35:18.1	
5	Omar Aguirre	Ecuador	1:42:02.6	

=== High jump ===
26 May

Rank	Name	Nationality	Result	Notes
1st place, gold medalist(s)	Gilmar Mayo	Colombia	2.25	CR
2nd place, silver medalist(s)	Marcos dos Santos	Brazil	2.15	
3rd place, bronze medalist(s)	Fernando Moreno	Argentina	2.15	
4	Hugo Muñoz	Peru	2.15	
5	Felipe Apablaza	Chile	2.05	
6	Alcides Silva	Brazil	2.00	

=== Pole vault ===
28 May

Rank	Name	Nationality	Result	Notes
1st place, gold medalist(s)	Cristián Aspillaga	Chile	4.70	
2nd place, silver medalist(s)	Oscar Veit	Argentina	4.60	
3rd place, bronze medalist(s)	Renato Bortolocci	Brazil	4.40	
4	Andrés Aspillaga	Chile	4.40	
5	Rodrigo Casacurta	Brazil	4.20	
	Fernando Pastoriza	Argentina	NM	

=== Long jump ===
27 May

Rank	Name	Nationality	Result	Notes
1st place, gold medalist(s)	Douglas de Souza	Brazil	8.05	CR
2nd place, silver medalist(s)	Nélson Carlos Ferreira	Brazil	8.05	CR
3rd place, bronze medalist(s)	Oscar Valiente	Peru	7.16	
4	Cyril Doorkamp	Suriname	7.15	
5	Diego Vázquez	Argentina	7.09	
6	Sergio Saavedra	Venezuela	7.00	
7	Pedro Scott	Panama	6.74	
8	José Duarte	Paraguay	6.48	
9	Freddy Nieves	Ecuador	6.43	

=== Triple jump ===
28 May

Rank	Name	Nationality	Result	Notes
1st place, gold medalist(s)	Messias José Baptista	Brazil	16.29	
2nd place, silver medalist(s)	Sergio Saavedra	Venezuela	16.25	
3rd place, bronze medalist(s)	Jefferson Ilário	Brazil	16.16	
4	Freddy Nieves	Ecuador	16.05	
5	Pedro Scott	Panama	14.49	

=== Shot put ===
27 May

Rank	Name	Nationality	Result	Notes
1st place, gold medalist(s)	Gert Weil	Chile	19.02	
2nd place, silver medalist(s)	Yojer Medina	Venezuela	18.82	
3rd place, bronze medalist(s)	Adilson Oliveira	Brazil	17.68	
4	Édson Miguel	Brazil	17.63	
5	Orlando Ibarra	Colombia	16.04	
6	Adrián Marzo	Argentina	16.03	
7	Marcelo Pugliese	Argentina	15.94	
8	Daniel Duharte	Peru	13.77	

=== Discus throw ===
28 May

Rank	Name	Nationality	Result	Notes
1st place, gold medalist(s)	João dos Santos	Brazil	58.52	
2nd place, silver medalist(s)	Marcelo Pugliese	Argentina	57.80	
3rd place, bronze medalist(s)	Édson Miguel	Brazil	52.30	
4	Yojer Medina	Venezuela	52.12	
5	Rogelio Ospino	Colombia	49.22	
6	Orlando Ibarra	Colombia	47.74	

=== Hammer throw ===
28 May

Rank	Name	Nationality	Result	Notes
1st place, gold medalist(s)	Andrés Charadía	Argentina	70.34	
2nd place, silver medalist(s)	Adrián Marzo	Argentina	69.04	
3rd place, bronze medalist(s)	Pedro Rivail Atílio	Brazil	59.14	
4	Mario Leme	Brazil	56.50	
5	Eduardo Acuña	Peru	56.34	

=== Javelin throw ===
26 May

Rank	Name	Nationality	Result	Notes
1st place, gold medalist(s)	Luis Lucumí	Colombia	76.82	
2nd place, silver medalist(s)	Mauricio Silva	Argentina	71.72	
3rd place, bronze medalist(s)	Marcos Vieira	Brazil	70.04	
4	Luiz Fernando da Silva	Brazil	68.44	
5	Gustavo Wielandt	Chile	64.16	
6	Michael Musselmann	Peru	62.68	

=== Decathlon ===
26–27 May

The highest mark recorded in each event is highlighted in yellow

Rank	Athlete	Nationality	100m	LJ	SP	HJ	400m	110m H	DT	PV	JT	1500m	Points	Notes
1st place, gold medalist(s)	Pedro da Silva	Brazil	11.71	6.60	15.00	2.05	52.24	14.88	45.10	4.40	63.60	5:22.88	7374	
2nd place, silver medalist(s)	Márcio de Souza	Brazil	11.49	6.47	11.14	1.90	50.75	15.20	36.02	4.40	48.26	4:59.13	6762	
3rd place, bronze medalist(s)	Oscar Veit	Argentina	11.95	6.74	12.58	1.87	53.80	16.21	37.36	4.50	55.08	5:23.80	6565	
4	Oscar Valiente	Peru	11.71	7.11w	12.01	1.96	53.67	15.77	36.98	3.20	57.68	5:18.95	6503	
5	Diego Kerwitz	Argentina	12.07	6.51	10.27	2.02	52.39	16.60	29.66	4.10	37.80	5:03.95	6086	
	Juan Carlos Silva	Uruguay	11.75	6.61w	11.33	1.93	53.23	15.74	?	–	–	–	DNF	

== Women's results ==
=== 100 metres ===
Heats – 26 May
Wind:
Heat 1: -0.7 m/s, Heat 2: -0.7 m/s

Rank	Heat	Name	Nationality	Time	Notes
1	1	Cleide Amaral	Brazil	11.61	Q
2	2	Kátia Regina Santos	Brazil	11.62	Q
3	1	Mirtha Brock	Colombia	11.68	Q
4	2	Zandra Borrero	Colombia	11.85	Q
5	2	Marcela Tiscornia	Uruguay	12.10	Q
6	1	Lisette Rondón	Chile	12.48	Q
7	2	Hannelore Grosser	Chile	12.54	q
8	1	Ondina Rodríguez	Ecuador	12.70	q
9	2	Jacqueline Solíz	Bolivia	12.72	
10	2	Elizabel Godoy	Ecuador	12.80	

Final – 26 May

Wind:+0.4 m/s

Rank	Name	Nationality	Time	Notes
1st place, gold medalist(s)	Cleide Amaral	Brazil	11.38	
2nd place, silver medalist(s)	Mirtha Brock	Colombia	11.52	
3rd place, bronze medalist(s)	Kátia Regina Santos	Brazil	11.52	
4	Zandra Borrero	Colombia	11.74	
5	Marcela Tiscornia	Uruguay	12.12	
6	Hannelore Grosser	Chile	12.44	
7	Lisette Rondón	Chile	12.54	
	Ondina Rodríguez	Ecuador	DNS	

=== 200 metres ===
Heats – 28 May
Wind:
Heat 1: +1.0 m/s, Heat 2: +0.7 m/s

Rank	Heat	Name	Nationality	Time	Notes
1	1	Kátia Regina Santos	Brazil	24.00	Q
2	2	Cleide Amaral	Brazil	24.38	Q
3	1	Marcela Tiscornia	Uruguay	24.43	Q
4	1	Patricia Rodríguez	Colombia	24.52	Q
5	1	Verónica de Paoli	Argentina	24.65	q
6	2	Mirtha Brock	Colombia	24.68	Q
7	1	Lisette Rondón	Chile	25.29	q
8	2	Hannelore Grosser	Chile	25.45	Q
9	2	Jacqueline Solíz	Bolivia	26.14	

Final – 28 May

Wind: +1.1 m/s

Rank	Name	Nationality	Time	Notes
1st place, gold medalist(s)	Kátia Regina Santos	Brazil	23.34	
2nd place, silver medalist(s)	Cleide Amaral	Brazil	23.39	
3rd place, bronze medalist(s)	Patricia Rodríguez	Colombia	23.42	
4	Mirtha Brock	Colombia	23.81	
5	Marcela Tiscornia	Uruguay	24.28	
6	Verónica de Paoli	Argentina	24.58	
7	Lisette Rondón	Chile	24.71	
8	Hannelore Grosser	Chile	25.15	

=== 400 metres ===
27 May

Rank	Name	Nationality	Time	Notes
1st place, gold medalist(s)	Ximena Restrepo	Colombia	51.93	
2nd place, silver medalist(s)	Luciana Mendes	Brazil	52.64	
3rd place, bronze medalist(s)	Patricia Rodríguez	Colombia	52.95	
4	Marlene da Silva	Brazil	53.80	
5	Ismenia Guzmán	Chile	55.82	
6	Mercy Colorado	Ecuador	56.75	
7	Marcela Barros	Chile	56.88	

=== 800 metres ===
26 May

Rank	Name	Nationality	Time	Notes
1st place, gold medalist(s)	Marlene da Silva	Brazil	2:04.57	
2nd place, silver medalist(s)	Marta Orellana	Argentina	2:06.37	
3rd place, bronze medalist(s)	Mercy Colorado	Ecuador	2:10.36	
4	Lorena Calbul	Chile	2:13.07	
5	Clara Morales	Chile	2:13.66	
6	María Soledad Terra	Uruguay	2:18.47	
7	Patricia Martínez	Peru	2:23.19	
8	Mónica Pereira	Paraguay	2:27.50	
	Fabiane dos Santos	Brazil	DQ	

=== 1500 metres ===
28 May

Rank	Name	Nationality	Time	Notes
1st place, gold medalist(s)	Marta Orellana	Argentina	4:21.60	
2nd place, silver medalist(s)	Célia dos Santos	Brazil	4:23.23	
3rd place, bronze medalist(s)	Clara Morales	Chile	4:24.89	
4	Lorena Calbul	Chile	4:27.65	
5	Nélida Vivas	Argentina	4:30.52	
6	Bertha Sánchez	Colombia	4:30.89	
7	María Soledad Terra	Uruguay	4:58.95	
8	Mónica Pereira	Paraguay	5:06.06	

=== 5000 metres ===
26 May

Rank	Name	Nationality	Time	Notes
1st place, gold medalist(s)	Marlene Flores	Chile	16:48.35	CR
2nd place, silver medalist(s)	Esneda Londoño	Colombia	16:48.67	
3rd place, bronze medalist(s)	Bertha Sánchez	Colombia	16:49.58	
4	María Inés Rodríguez	Argentina	17:45.05	
5	Rizoneide Wanderley	Brazil	17:48.65	

=== 10,000 metres ===
27 May

Rank	Name	Nationality	Time	Notes
1st place, gold medalist(s)	Carmem de Oliveira	Brazil	33:55.84	
2nd place, silver medalist(s)	Marlene Flores	Chile	34:48.45	
3rd place, bronze medalist(s)	Esneda Londoño	Colombia	36:26.55	

=== 100 metres hurdles ===
Heats – 27 May
Wind:
Heat 1: +1.2 m/s, Heat 2: +0.2 m/s

Rank	Heat	Name	Nationality	Time	Notes
	2	Nadège Joseph*	French Guiana	13.73	Q
1	2	Carmen Bezanilla	Chile	13.95	Q
2	2	Vânia da Silva	Brazil	14.14	Q
3	1	Verónica de Paoli	Argentina	14.22	Q
4	1	Marise de Castro	Brazil	14.33	Q
5	1	Alejandra Martínez	Chile	14.52	Q
6	2	Martha Dinas	Colombia	14.64	q
7	1	Ondina Rodríguez	Ecuador	15.37	q
8	1	Elizabel Godoy	Ecuador	16.36	

Final – 27 May

Wind: -0.1 m/s

Rank	Name	Nationality	Time	Notes
1	Nadège Joseph*	French Guiana	13.48	
1st place, gold medalist(s)	Carmen Bezanilla	Chile	13.62	
2nd place, silver medalist(s)	Verónica de Paoli	Argentina	13.92	
3rd place, bronze medalist(s)	Vânia da Silva	Brazil	14.03	
4	Alejandra Martínez	Chile	14.33	
5	Marise de Castro	Brazil	14.36	
6	Martha Dinas	Colombia	14.77	
7	Ondina Rodríguez	Ecuador	15.60	

=== 400 metres hurdles ===
26 May

Rank	Name	Nationality	Time	Notes
1st place, gold medalist(s)	Ximena Restrepo	Colombia	57.42	
2nd place, silver medalist(s)	Marise da Silva	Brazil	58.62	
	Carole Nelson	French Guiana	58.64	
3rd place, bronze medalist(s)	Flor Robledo	Colombia	59.90	
4	Maria José Santos	Brazil	1:00.32	
5	Sandra Izquierdo	Argentina	1:00.73	
6	Ondina Rodríguez	Ecuador	1:04.25	

=== 4 × 100 metres relay ===
27 May

Rank	Nation	Competitors	Time	Notes
1st place, gold medalist(s)	Brazil	Cleide Amaral, Lucimar de Moura, Vânia da Silva, Kátia Regina Santos	44.97	
2nd place, silver medalist(s)	Colombia	Helena Guerrero, Sandra Borrero, Mirtha Brock, Flor Robledo	45.64	
3rd place, bronze medalist(s)	Chile	Marcela Barros, Carmen Bezanilla, Lisette Rondón, Hannelore Grosser	46.73	

=== 4 × 400 metres relay ===
28 May

Rank	Nation	Competitors	Time	Notes
1st place, gold medalist(s)	Colombia	Mirtha Brock, Flor Robledo, Patricia Rodríguez, Ximena Restrepo	3:33.37	
2nd place, silver medalist(s)	Chile	Marcela Barros, Hannelore Grosser, Carmen Bezanilla, Ismenia Guzmán	3:42.27	
3rd place, bronze medalist(s)	Argentina	Mariela Andrade, Verónica de Paoli, Sandra Izquierdo, Marta Orellana	3:49.58	
	Brazil		DQ	

=== 10,000 metres walk ===
27 May

Rank	Name	Nationality	Time	Notes
1st place, gold medalist(s)	Miriam Ramón	Ecuador	49:26.42	
2nd place, silver medalist(s)	Liliana Bermeo	Colombia	49:34.85	
3rd place, bronze medalist(s)	Nailze de Azevedo	Brazil	52:41.78	
4	Ángela Aliaga	Bolivia	52:54.96	

=== High jump ===
27 May

Rank	Name	Nationality	Result	Notes
1st place, gold medalist(s)	Orlane dos Santos	Brazil	1.80	
2nd place, silver medalist(s)	Luciane Dambacher	Brazil	1.75	
3rd place, bronze medalist(s)	Mariela Andrade	Argentina	1.70	

=== Pole vault ===
26 May

Rank	Name	Nationality	Result	Notes
1st place, gold medalist(s)	Alejandra García	Argentina	3.20	CR
2nd place, silver medalist(s)	Conceição Geremias	Brazil	2.70	
3rd place, bronze medalist(s)	Patrícia de Oliveira	Brazil	2.30	

=== Long jump ===
26 May

Rank	Name	Nationality	Result	Notes
1st place, gold medalist(s)	Andrea Ávila	Argentina	6.58	CR
2nd place, silver medalist(s)	Luciana dos Santos	Brazil	6.16	
3rd place, bronze medalist(s)	Helena Guerrero	Colombia	6.06	
4	Mónica Castro	Chile	5.77	
5	Lucineide Oliveira	Brazil	5.67	
6	Milly Figueroa	Colombia	5.58	
7	Elizabel Godoy	Ecuador	5.51	

=== Triple jump ===
27 May

Rank	Name	Nationality	Result	Notes
1st place, gold medalist(s)	Andrea Ávila	Argentina	13.34	
2nd place, silver medalist(s)	Luciana dos Santos	Brazil	13.07	
3rd place, bronze medalist(s)	Milly Figueroa	Colombia	12.62	
4	Margit Weise	Brazil	12.13	
	Mónica Castro	Chile	NM	

=== Shot put ===
26 May

Rank	Name	Nationality	Result	Notes
1st place, gold medalist(s)	Elisângela Adriano	Brazil	17.37	CR
2nd place, silver medalist(s)	María Isabel Urrutia	Colombia	16.43	
3rd place, bronze medalist(s)	Alexandra Amaro	Brazil	16.43	
4	Carmen Chalá	Ecuador	14.16	

=== Discus throw ===
27 May

Rank	Name	Nationality	Result	Notes
1st place, gold medalist(s)	Amélia Moreira	Brazil	55.10	
2nd place, silver medalist(s)	María Isabel Urrutia	Colombia	54.60	
3rd place, bronze medalist(s)	Liliana Martinelli	Argentina	54.32	
4	Elisângela Adriano	Brazil	42.58	
5	Carmen Chalá	Ecuador	41.38	
6	María Eugenia Villamizar	Colombia	39.70	

=== Hammer throw ===
27 May

Rank	Name	Nationality	Result	Notes
1st place, gold medalist(s)	María Eugenia Villamizar	Colombia	56.34	CR
2nd place, silver medalist(s)	Karina Moya	Argentina	52.18	
3rd place, bronze medalist(s)	Zulma Lambert	Argentina	50.74	
4	Maria Ines Pacheco	Brazil	47.00	
5	Margitt Wahlbrink	Brazil	45.60	

=== Javelin throw ===
26 May

Rank	Name	Nationality	Result	Notes
1st place, gold medalist(s)	Zuleima Araméndiz	Colombia	54.82	
2nd place, silver medalist(s)	Carla Bispo	Brazil	52.56	
3rd place, bronze medalist(s)	Zorobabelia Córdoba	Colombia	51.82	
4	Alessandra Resende	Brazil	49.40	
5	Mariela Arch	Argentina	45.26	
6	Daniela Muñoz	Uruguay	42.54	

=== Heptathlon ===
27–28 May

The highest mark recorded in each event is highlighted in yellow

Rank	Athlete	Nationality	100m H	HJ	SP	200m	LJ	JT	800m	Points	Notes
1st place, gold medalist(s)	Zorobabelia Córdoba	Colombia	14.38	1.66	12.80	25.02	5.17	52.30	2:33.39	5495	
2nd place, silver medalist(s)	Euzinete dos Reis	Brazil	14.69	1.60	11.65	25.62	5.57	41.68	2:20.68	5322	
3rd place, bronze medalist(s)	Andrea Ávila	Argentina	14.20	1.76	9.72	25.69	6.20	28.34	2:27.87	5290	
4	Alejandra García	Argentina	14.25	1.66	11.33	25.82	5.65	32.14	?	4400	
5	Conceição Geremias	Brazil	14.85	1.63	12.90	26.87	5.34	32.06	?	4247	
