= Athletics at the 1997 Bolivarian Games =

Medal summary of 1997 Bolivarian Games

Athletics at the XIII Bolivarian Games
- Dates: October 17–26
- Host city: Arequipa, Perú (Peru)
- Venue: Estadio Monumental Vírgen de Chapi
- Level: Senior
- Events: 45 (23 men, 22 women)

Athletics competitions at the 1997 Bolivarian Games were held at the Estadio Monumental Vírgen de Chapi in Arequipa, Perú, between October 17–26, 1997.

Gold medal winners from Ecuador were published by the Comité Olímpico Ecuatoriano.

A total of 45 events were contested, 23 by men and 22 by women.

== Medal summary ==
Medal winners were published.

All results are marked as "affected by altitude" (A), because Arequipa is located at 2,335 m above sea level.

=== Men ===
Event	Gold		Silver		Bronze	
100 metres (Wind: 0.6 m/s)	Jorge Cañizales (VEN)	10.45 A	Robinson Urrutia (COL)	10.54 A	Fernando Robledo (COL)	10.56 A
200 metres (Wind: 1.6 m/s)	Jorge Cañizales (VEN)	20.87 A	Julio César Rojas (COL)	21.15 A	Javier Verme (PER)	21.39 A
400 metres	Julio César Rojas (COL)	46.10 A	Wenceslao Ferrín (COL)	46.90 A	Víctor Camero (VEN)	46.97 A
800 metres	José López (VEN)	1:48.04 A	Luis Díaz (VEN)	1:49.58 A	John Chávez (COL)	1:49.69 A
1500 metres	José López (VEN)	3:53.8 A	Mark Olivo (VEN)	3:58.5 A	Pablo Ramírez (ECU)	3:59.9 A
5000 metres	Herder Vásquez (COL)	14:33.3 A	Franklin Tenorio (ECU)	14:36.3 A	Julio Cutipa (PER)	14:50.3 A
10,000 metres	Herder Vásquez (COL)	30:11.4 A	José López (COL)	30:14.8 A	Julio Cutipa (PER)	30:15.1 A
Marathon	Gilberto Torres (PER)	2:26:10 A	José Carrasco (COL)	2:26:56 A	Julio Chuqui (ECU)	2:27:23 A
3000 metres steeplechase	Silvano Simeón (PER)	9:12.6 A	Giovanni Morejón (BOL)	9:15.3 A	Pablo Ramírez (ECU)	9:23.0 A
110 metres hurdles (Wind: 0.0 m/s)	José Humberto Rivas (COL)	14.12 A	José David Riesco (PER)	14.17 A	José Gregorio Turbay (VEN)	14.27 A
400 metres hurdles	Llimy Rivas (COL)	50.14 A	Alexander Mena (COL)	50.65 A	Antonio Smith (VEN)	51.44 A
4 x 100 metres relay	Venezuela; Antonio Medina; Jorge Cañizales ? José Manuel Carabalí	39.85 A	Ecuador; Dean Torres; Dick Perlaza; Carlos Aguilera; Fabricio Lara	41.32 A	Bolivia; Rodrigo Arteaga; Iván Molina; Luis Villaroel; Juan Sanjines	42.18 A
4 x 400 metres relay	Colombia; Wenceslao Ferrín; Julio César Rojas; Llimy Rivas; John Mena	3:05.57 A	Venezuela; Oswaldo Torres; Víctor Camero; Dany Núñez; Claudio Silva	3:09.51 A		
20 Kilometres Road Walk	Jefferson Pérez (ECU)	1:27:54 A	Héctor Moreno (COL)	1:29:51 A	Juan Rojas (ECU)	1:30:37 A
High jump	Alfredo Deza (PER)	2.15 A	Franco Moy (PER)	2.10 A	José Cáceres (PER)	2.05 A
Pole vault	Luis Hidalgo (VEN)	4.90 A	Johnny Romero (VEN)	4.90 A		
Long jump	Esteban Copland (VEN)	7.58 A	José Reyes (VEN)	7.53 A	Yesid Cossio (COL)	7.48 A
Triple jump	Sergio Saavedra (VEN)	15.82 A	Miguel Padrón (VEN)	15.74 A	Oscar Valiente (PER)	15.39 A
Shot put	Yojer Medina (VEN)	19.40 A	Ronny Jiménez (VEN)	16.58 A	Orlando Ibarra (COL)	16.51 A
Discus throw	Yojer Medina (VEN)	56.72 A	Julián Angulo (COL)	51.04 A	Rogelio Ospina (COL)	50.06 A
Hammer throw	Eduardo Acuña (PER)	63.40 A	Aldo Bello (VEN)	60.70 A	David Castrillón (COL)	58.62 A
Javelin throw	Luis Lucumí (COL)	74.72 A	Edwin Cuesta (VEN)	67.38 A	Jorge Quiñónez (PER)	66.26 A
Decathlon	Eladio Farfán (VEN)	7026 A	Diógenes Estévez (VEN)	6440 A	Wilfredo Carias (VEN)	6304 A

=== Women ===
Event	Gold		Silver		Bronze	
100 metres (Wind: 2.6 m/s)	Felipa Palacios (COL)	11.15 A w	Mirtha Brock (COL)	11.50 A w	Ana Caicedo (ECU)	11.67 A w
200 metres (Wind: 3.1 m/s)	Felipa Palacios (COL)	22.74 A w	Patricia Rodríguez (COL)	23.57 A w	Mirtha Brock (COL)	23.86 A w
400 metres	Patricia Rodríguez (COL)	53.31 A	Janeth Lucumí (COL)	55.81 A	Zulay Nazareno (ECU)	56.44 A
800 metres	Mercy Colorado (ECU)	2:07.39 A	Janeth Lucumí (COL)	2:07.72 A	Carmen Mancilla (BOL)	2:12.11 A
1500 metres	Janeth Caizalitín (ECU)	4:29.1 A	Rosa Mila Ibarra (COL)	4:29.7 A	Niusha Mancilla (BOL)	4:33.3 A
5000 metres	Janeth Caizalitín (ECU)	18:26.1 A	Rosa Mila Ibarra (COL)	18:27.4 A	Wilma Guerra (ECU)	18:34.3 A
10,000 metres	Martha Tenorio (ECU)	36:05.85 A	Florinda Tamayo (PER)	36:22.56 A	Iglandini González (COL)	36:33.14 A
Marathon	Hortensia Aliaga (PER)	3:25:24 A	Paulina Mamani (PER)	3:27:16 A	Cinthya Soto (PER)	3:32:04 A
100 metres hurdles (Wind: 0.0 m/s)	Princesa Oliveros (COL)	13.94 A	Paula Yáñez (VEN)	14.30 A	Gilda Massa (PER)	14.49 A
400 metres hurdles	Princesa Oliveros (COL)	59.65 A	Ondina Rodríguez (ECU)	61.00 A	Helen Delgado (VEN)	61.15 A
4 x 100 metres relay	Colombia; Mirtha Brock; Helena Guerrero; Patricia Rodríguez; Sandra Borrero	43.89 A	Venezuela; Mackarly MacGregor; Adriana González; Emy Ochoa; Fanny Sevilla	45.99 A	Ecuador; Ana Caicedo; Ana Villasis; Zulay Nazareno; Ondina Rodríguez	47.10 A
4 x 400 metres relay	Colombia; Patricia Rodríguez; Mirtha Brock; Janeth Lucumí; Princesa Oliveros	3:44.76 A	Ecuador; Ondina Rodríguez; Zulay Nazareno; Maritza Valencia; Martha González	3:47.94 A	Panama; Ivette Sánchez; Rita Alcazar; Zolveik Ruiz; Velveth Moreno	3:52.94 A
10 Kilometres Road Walk	Geovana Irusta (BOL)	50:29 A	Liliana Bermeo (COL)	50:51 A	Miriam Ramón (ECU)	52:49 A
High jump	Yetzálida Pérez (VEN)	1.78 A	Gladibeth Morles (VEN)	1.75 A	Vivian González (VEN)	1.67 A
Pole vault	Karol Borja (PER)	2.70 A	Johana Peña (ECU)	2.70 A	Irina Castillo (PER)	2.70 A
Long jump	Nathaniel Gómez (VEN)	6.08 A	Helena Guerrero (COL)	5.98 A	Ana Caicedo (ECU)	5.96 A
Triple jump	Ludmila Reyes (VEN)	13.12 A	Nathaniel Gómez (VEN)	12.62 A	Ana Villasis (ECU)	12.03 A
Shot put	María Isabel Urrutia (COL)	15.51 A	Fanny García (VEN)	13.73 A	Rosa Peña (PER)	12.83 A
Discus throw	María Isabel Urrutia (COL)	51.80 A	Fanny García (VEN)	45.76 A	Karella Agurto (PER)	38.84 A
Hammer throw	María Eugenia Villamizar (COL)	58.68 A	Dubraska Rodríguez (VEN)	52.14 A	Anabell Gómez (VEN)	51.98 A
Javelin throw	Zuleima Araméndiz (COL)	58.04 A	Sabina Moya (COL)	49.94 A	Marieta Riera (VEN)	49.58 A
Heptathlon	Zorobabelia Córdoba (COL)	5275 A	Gladibeth Morles (VEN)	4885 A	Rubia Quintanilla (VEN)	4745 A

== Medal table (unofficial) ==
* Host nation (Peru)

Rank	Nation	Gold	Silver	Bronze	Total
1	Colombia	19	17	8	44
2	Venezuela	14	18	9	41
3	Peru*	6	4	11	21
4	Ecuador	5	5	11	21
5	Bolivia	1	1	3	5
6	Panama	0	0	1	1
Totals (6 entries)		45	45	43	133
