= Athletics at the Pacific Ocean Games =

Athletics at the I Pacific Ocean Games
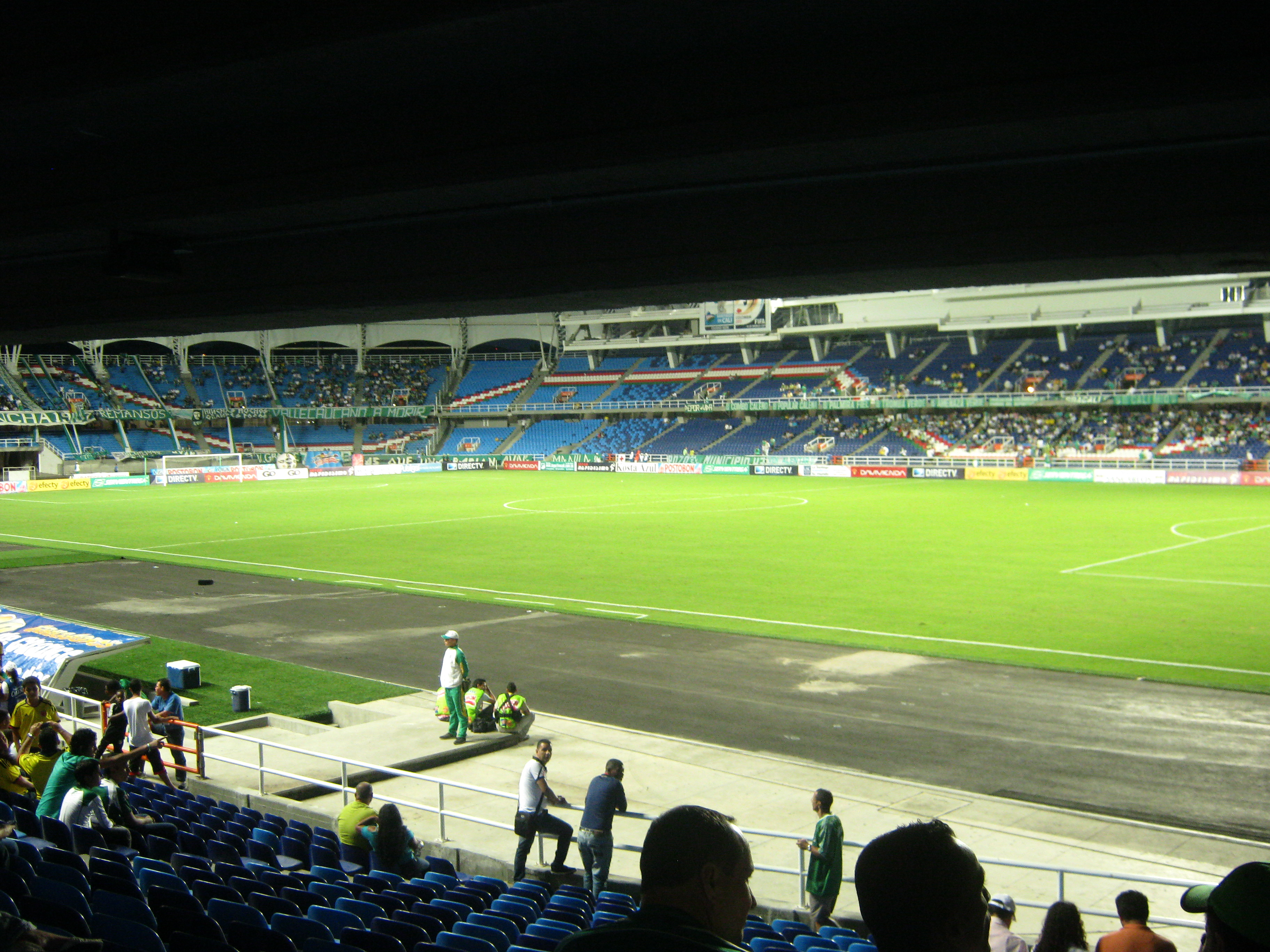
- The host stadium in 2012
- Dates: June 24–July 2
- Host city: Cali, Colombia
- Venue: Estadio Olímpico Pascual Guerrero
- Level: Senior
- Events: 31

At the 1995 Pacific Ocean Games, the athletics events were held at the Estadio Olímpico Pascual Guerrero in Cali, Colombia from June 24 to July 2. A total of 31 events were contested, of which 14 by male and 17 by female athletes. The athletics competition did not attract many of the highest level athletes from the Pacific Rim countries and the host nation athletes were foremost among in the medallists. Colombia topped the medal table with 14 gold medals and 41 medals overall. The United States won the next highest number of gold medals, with four, while Chile had the next highest medal total, with ten.

American Randall Evans completed a 100 metres/200 metres double in the men's section and surprised the crowd by stripping topless in his victory. Other doubles were achieved by host nation athletes Jacinto Navarrete (men's 1500 metres and 5000 metres) and María Isabel Urrutia (women's shot put and discus throw), and also by Mexico's María del Carmen Díaz (women's 5000 m and 10,000 metres).

== Medal summary ==
=== Men ===
| Event | Gold | | Silver | | Bronze | |
|---|---|---|---|---|---|---|
| 100 metres (Wind: +2.1 m/s) | Randall Evans (USA) | 10.22w | Marlin Cannon (USA) | 10.40w | Huang Hsin-ping (TPE) | 10.41w |
| 200 metres | Randall Evans (USA) | 20.65 | Marlin Cannon (USA) | 20.70 | Ricardo Roach (CHI) | 20.96 |
| 400 metres^{[nb1]} | Son Ju-Il (KOR) | 46.02 | Wilson Cañizales (COL) | 46.81 | Ricardo Roach (CHI) | 47.64 |
| 800 metres | Pablo Squella (CHI) | 1:50.42 | Alcides Pinto (COL) | 1:51.08 | Rolando Ortíz (COL) | 1:53.03 |
| 1500 metres | Jacinto Navarrete (COL) | 4:08.32 | Jesús Capula (MEX) | 4:08.85 | Víctor Cano (COL) | 4:09.27 |
| 5000 metres | Jacinto Navarrete (COL) | 13:49.40 | Gabino Apolonio (MEX) | 13:51.21 | Herder Vásquez (COL) | 14:14.06 |
| 10,000 metres | Herder Vásquez (COL) | 29:46.81 | Jesús Capula (MEX) | 30:30.85 | William Roldán (COL) | 30:57.01 |
| 110 metres hurdles | Takahiro Matsuhisa (JPN) | 13.88 | Arturo Rodríguez (CHI) | 13.99 | José Humberto Rivas (COL) | 14.42 |
| 400 metres hurdles | Ryan Hayden (USA) | 49.98 | Llimy Rivas (COL) | 51.22 | Alex Foster (CRC) | 54.20 |
| 4 × 100 metres relay | Colombia (COL); Luis Vega; John Mena; Wilson Cañizales; Wenceslao Ferrín | 39.81 NR | Ecuador (ECU); Dick Perlaza; Eddy Quiñones; Freddy Nieves; Fabricio Lara | 40.22 | Chinese Taipei (TPE); Nai Hui-fang; Huang Hsin-ping; Tao Wu-shiun; Hu Wen-yu | 42.87 |
| 20 km walk | Héctor Moreno (COL) | 1:28:06 | Querubín Moreno (COL) | 1:36:31 | Carlos Montalván (ECU) | 1:37:54 |
| High jump | Lee Jin-taek (KOR) | 2.29 m | Gilmar Mayo (COL) | 2.29 m | Omar Dixon (USA) | 2.10 m |
| Pole vault | Cristián Aspillaga (CHI) | 5.10 m | Only one athlete cleared a height | | | |
| Long jump | Nai Hui-fang (TPE) | 7.72 m | Lewis Asprilla (COL) | 7.09 m | Freddy Nieves (ECU) | 6.88 m |

- ^{nb1} American Antonio Pettigrew was the winner of the 400 m race, but he was not the specified American representative and was competing as a guest athlete.

=== Women ===
| Event | Gold | | Silver | | Bronze | |
|---|---|---|---|---|---|---|
| 100 metres | Mirtha Brock (COL) | 11.2 | Felipa Palacios (COL) | 11.3 | Chen Shu-Chuan (TPE) | 11.6 |
| 200 metres | Maicel Malone (USA) | 22.59 | Patricia Rodríguez (COL) | 23.16 | Felipa Palacios (COL) | 23.78 |
| 400 metres | Ximena Restrepo (COL) | 52.66 | Ana Solano (ECU) | 60.30 | Zulay Nazareno (ECU) | 60.32 |
| 800 metres | Norfalia Carabalí (COL) | 2:10.38 | Clara Morales (CHI) | 2:11.99 | Janeth Lucumí (COL) | 2:12.94 |
| 1500 metres | Clara Morales (CHI) | 4:37.09 | Bertha Sánchez (COL) | 4:38.56 | María del Carmen Díaz (MEX) | 4:41.45 |
| 5000 metres | María del Carmen Díaz (MEX) | 16:23.76 | Iglandini González (COL) | 16:35.62 | Marlene Flores (CHI) | 17:16.80 |
| 10,000 metres | María del Carmen Díaz (MEX) | 33:42.64 | Iglandini González (COL) | 35:17.19 | Marlene Flores (CHI) | 36:15.83 |
| 100 metres hurdles | Chan Sau Ying (HKG) | 13.37 | Carmen Bezanilla (CHI) | 13.67 | Zorobabelia Córdoba (COL) | 14.45 |
| 400 metres hurdles | Flor Robledo (COL) | 58.82 | Pan Hsiu-Lan (TPE) | 60.27 | Ondina Rodríguez (ECU) | 65.17 |
| 4 × 100 metres relay | Colombia (COL) | 44.53 | Ecuador (ECU) | 49.46 | Only two starting teams | |
| 10,000 m walk | Miriam Ramón (ECU) | 48:36.29 | Liliana Bermeo (COL) | 48:48.74 | María Colín (MEX) | 49:14.97 |
| High jump | Tang Li-Wen (TPE) | 1.70 m | Fernanda Mosquera (COL) | 1.70 m | Zorobabelia Córdoba (COL) | 1.55 m |
| Long jump | Helena Guerrero (COL) | 5.88 m | Milly Figueroa (COL) | 5.75 m | Narcisa Gaona (ECU) | 5.28 m |
| Triple jump | Milly Figueroa (COL) | 12.15 m | Eyda Rentería (COL) | 11.68 m | María Calderón (ESA) | 10.42 m |
| Shot put | María Urrutia (COL) | 14.81 m | Dolores Tuimoloau (ASA) | 13.80 m | Zorobabelia Córdoba (COL) | 12.48 m |
| Discus throw | María Urrutia (COL) | 52.52 m | Eva María Dimas (ESA) | 45.00 m | María Eugenia Villamizar (COL) | 43.84 m |
| Hammer throw | Aya Suzuki (JPN) | 55.96 m | María Eugenia Villamizar (COL) | 54.82 m | Eva María Dimas (ESA) | 43.28 m |

== Medal table ==
* Host nation (Colombia)

| Rank | Nation | Gold | Silver | Bronze | Total |
|---|---|---|---|---|---|
| 1 | Colombia (COL)* | 14 | 16 | 11 | 41 |
| 2 | United States (USA) | 4 | 2 | 1 | 7 |
| 3 | Chile (CHI) | 3 | 3 | 4 | 10 |
| 4 | Mexico (MEX) | 2 | 3 | 1 | 6 |
| 5 | Chinese Taipei (TPE) | 2 | 1 | 3 | 6 |
| 6 | Japan (JPN) | 2 | 0 | 0 | 2 |
| 6 | South Korea (KOR) | 2 | 0 | 0 | 2 |
| 8 | Ecuador (ECU) | 1 | 3 | 5 | 9 |
| 9 | Hong Kong (HKG) | 1 | 0 | 0 | 1 |
| 10 | El Salvador (ESA) | 0 | 1 | 3 | 4 |
| 11 | American Samoa (ASA) | 0 | 1 | 0 | 1 |
| 12 | Costa Rica (CRC) | 0 | 0 | 1 | 1 |
| Totals (12 entries) | | 31 | 30 | 29 | 90 |

== See also ==
- Athletics at the 1995 Pan American Games
- 1995 Asian Athletics Championships
