= 1995 South American Championships in Athletics =

- Dates: 26–28 May
- Host city: Manaus, Brazil
- Venue: Vila Olímpica de Manaus
- Events: 43
- Participation: 199 athletes from 15 nations

The 1995 South American Championships in Athletics were held at the Vila Olímpica in Manaus, Brazil, between 26 and 28 May. This was the first edition to feature women's 5000 metres (replacing 3000 metres), pole vault and hammer throw.

This edition also marked the first appearances of Guyana and Suriname at the championships.

== Medal summary ==
=== Men's events ===
Event	Gold		Silver		Bronze	
100 metres (wind: +0.2 m/s)	Robson da Silva; Brazil	10.29	Édson Ribeiro; Brazil	10.30	Carlos Gats; Argentina	10.51
200 metres (wind: +1.2 m/s)	Robson da Silva; Brazil	20.54	Claudinei da Silva; Brazil	20.68	Carlos Gats; Argentina	20.90
400 metres	Sanderlei Parrela; Brazil	45.74 CR	Inaldo Sena; Brazil	45.88	Wenceslao Ferrín; Colombia	46.33
800 metres	José Luíz Barbosa; Brazil	1:46.16 CR	José Carlos de Oliveira; Brazil	1:48.88	Pablo Squella; Chile	1:49.80
1500 metres	Edgar de Oliveira; Brazil	3:38.81 CR	José Carlos de Oliveira; Brazil	3:41.73	Jacinto Navarrete; Colombia	3:44.27
5000 metres	Ronaldo da Costa; Brazil	13:51.66 CR	Elenilson da Silva; Brazil	14:04.97	Jacinto Navarrete; Colombia	14:07.63
10,000 metres	Sérgio Gonçalves da Silva; Brazil	29:10.73	César Troncoso; Argentina	30:24.29	Waldemar Cotelo; Uruguay	30:43.66
3000 metres steeplechase	Clodoaldo do Carmo; Brazil	8:56.87	Eduardo do Nascimento; Brazil	8:57.81	Antonio Soliz; Argentina	9:04.26
110 metres hurdles (wind: -0.7 m/s)	Joilto Bonfim; Brazil	13.92	Arturo Rodríguez; Chile	14.42	Oscar Ratto; Argentina	14.60
400 metres hurdles	Eronilde de Araújo; Brazil	48.63 CR	Llimy Rivas; Colombia	50.37	Francisco Carlos de Lima; Brazil	52.19
4 × 100 metres relay	Brazil; Édson Ribeiro; Marcelo Brivilatti da Silva; Arnaldo da Silva; Robson da Silva	39.42 CR	Colombia; Robinson Urrutia; John Mena; Luis Vega; Wenceslao Ferrín	40.31	Argentina; Jorge Polanco; Cristian Vitasse; Guillermo Cacián; Carlos Gats	40.78
4 × 400 metres relay	Brazil; Osmar dos Santos; Eronilde de Araújo; Inaldo Sena; Sanderlei Parrela	3:04.93 CR	Colombia; Robinson Urrutia; Luis Vega; Llimy Rivas; Wenceslao Ferrín	3:10.16	Chile; Carlos Morales; Pablo Squella; Juan Francisco Cobo; Ricardo Roach	3:11.83
20,000 metres track walk	Querubín Moreno; Colombia	1:28:57.3 CR	Héctor Moreno; Colombia	1:31:03.9	Ademar Kammler; Brazil	1:32:17.9
High jump	Gilmar Mayo; Colombia	2.25 CR	Marcos dos Santos; Brazil	2.15	Fernando Moreno; Argentina	2.15
Pole vault	Cristián Aspillaga; Chile	4.70	Oscar Veit; Argentina	4.60	Renato Bortolocci; Brazil	4.40
Long jump	Douglas de Souza; Brazil	8.05 CR	Nelson Ferreira; Brazil	8.05	Oscar Valiente; Peru	7.16
Triple jump	Messias José Baptista; Brazil	16.29	Sergio Saavedra; Venezuela	16.25	Jefferson Ilário; Brazil	16.16
Shot put	Gert Weil; Chile	19.02	Yojer Medina; Venezuela	18.82	Adilson Oliveira; Brazil	17.68
Discus throw	João dos Santos; Brazil	58.52	Marcelo Pugliese; Argentina	57.80	Édson Miguel; Brazil	52.30
Hammer throw	Andrés Charadia; Argentina	70.34	Adrián Marzo; Argentina	69.04	Pedro Rivail Atílio; Brazil	59.14
Javelin throw	Luis Lucumí; Colombia	76.82	Mauricio Silva; Argentina	71.72	Marcos Vieira; Brazil	70.04
Decathlon	Pedro da Silva; Brazil	7374	Márcio de Souza; Brazil	6762	Oscar Veit; Argentina	6565

=== Women's events ===
Event	Gold		Silver		Bronze	
100 metres (wind: +0.4 m/s)	Cleide Amaral; Brazil	11.38	Mirtha Brock; Colombia	11.52	Kátia de Jesus Santos; Brazil	11.52
200 metres (wind: +1.1 m/s)	Kátia de Jesus Santos; Brazil	23.34	Cleide Amaral; Brazil	23.39	Patricia Rodríguez; Colombia	23.42
400 metres	Ximena Restrepo; Colombia	51.93	Luciana Mendes; Brazil	52.64	Patricia Rodríguez; Colombia	52.95
800 metres	Marlene da Silva; Brazil	2:04.57	Marta Orellana; Argentina	2:06.37	Mercy Colorado; Ecuador	2:10.36
1500 metres	Marta Orellana; Argentina	4:21.60	Célia dos Santos; Brazil	4:23.23	Clara Morales; Chile	4:24.89
5000 metres	Marlene Flores; Chile	16:48.35 CR	Esneda Londoño; Colombia	16:48.67	Bertha Sánchez; Colombia	16:49.58
10,000 metres	Carmem de Oliveira; Brazil	33:55.84	Marlene Flores; Chile	34:48.45	Esneda Londoño; Colombia	36:26.55
100 metres hurdles (wind: -0.1 m/s)	Carmen Bezanilla; Chile	13.62	Verónica Depaoli; Argentina	13.92	Vânia da Silva; Brazil	14.03
400 metres hurdles	Ximena Restrepo; Colombia	57.42	Marise da Silva; Brazil	58.62	Flor Robledo; Colombia	59.90
4 × 100 metres relay	Brazil; Cleide Amaral; Lucimar de Moura; Vânia da Silva; Kátia Regina Santos	44.97	Colombia; Helena Guerrero; Sandra Borrero; Mirtha Brock; Flor Robledo	45.64	Chile; Marcela Barros; Carmen Bezanilla; Lisette Rondón; Hannelore Grosser	46.73
4 × 400 metres relay	Colombia; Mirtha Brock; Flor Robledo; Patricia Rodríguez; Ximena Restrepo	3:33.37	Chile; Marcela Barros; Hannelore Grosser; Carmen Bezanilla; Ismenia Guzmán	3:42.27	Argentina; Mariela Andrade; Veronica Depaoli; Sandra Izquierdo; Marta Orellana	3:49.58
10,000 metres track walk	Miriam Ramón; Ecuador	49:26.4	Liliana Bermeo; Colombia	49:34.9	Nailse Pazin; Brazil	52:41.8
High jump	Orlane dos Santos; Brazil	1.80	Luciane Dambacher; Brazil	1.75	Mariela Andrade; Argentina	1.70
Pole vault	Alejandra García; Argentina	3.10 CR	Conceição Geremias; Brazil	2.70	Patrícia de Oliveira; Brazil	2.30
Long jump	Andrea Ávila; Argentina	6.58 CR	Luciana dos Santos; Brazil	6.16	Helena Guerrero; Colombia	6.06
Triple jump	Andrea Ávila; Argentina	13.34	Luciana dos Santos; Brazil	13.07	Milly Figueroa; Colombia	12.62
Shot put	Elisângela Adriano; Brazil	17.37 CR	María Isabel Urrutia; Colombia	16.43	Alexandra Amaro; Brazil	15.62
Discus throw	Amélia Moreira; Brazil	55.10	María Isabel Urrutia; Colombia	54.60	Liliana Martinelli; Argentina	54.32
Hammer throw	María Eugenia Villamizar; Colombia	56.34 CR	Karina Moya; Argentina	52.18	Zulma Lambert; Argentina	50.74
Javelin throw	Zuleima Araméndiz; Colombia	54.82	Carla Bispo; Brazil	52.56	Zorobabelia Córdoba; Colombia	51.82
Heptathlon	Zorobabelia Córdoba; Colombia	5495	Euzinete dos Reis; Brazil	5322	Andrea Ávila; Argentina	5290

== Medal table ==
Rank	Nation	Gold	Silver	Bronze	Total
1	Brazil	24	20	13	57
2	Colombia	9	10	11	30
3	Argentina	5	8	12	25
4	Chile	4	3	4	11
5	Ecuador	1	0	1	2
6	Venezuela	0	2	0	2
7	Peru	0	0	1	1
7	Uruguay	0	0	1	1
Totals (8 entries)		43	43	43	129

== Participating nations ==
Guyana and Suriname competed for the first time at these Championships. In addition, Angola and French Guiana participated as guests.

- Angola* (1)
- Argentina (34)
- Bolivia (7)
- Brazil (69)
- Chile (23)
- Colombia (29)
- Ecuador (11)
- French Guiana* (2)
- Guyana (1)
- Panama (2)
- Paraguay (2)
- Peru (7)
- Suriname (2)
- Uruguay (7)
- Venezuela (2)

*Countries participating as guests
