= 1999 South American Championships in Athletics =

40th South American Championships
- Dates: 25–27 June 1999
- Host city: Bogotá, Colombia
- Venue: Coliseo El Salitre
- Events: 43
- Participation: 260 athletes from 11 (+1 guest) nations
- Records set: 6 ARs, 19 CRs

The 1999 South American Championships in Athletics were held at the Coliseo El Salitre in Bogotá, Colombia from June 25–27.

== Medal summary ==
=== Men's events ===
Event	Gold		Silver		Bronze	
100 metres	André da Silva; Brazil	10.06A CR	Sebastián Keitel; Chile	10.13A	Heber Viera; Uruguay	10.15A
200 metres	Édson Ribeiro; Brazil	20.54Aw	Ricardo Roach; Chile	20.59Aw	Heber Viera; Uruguay	20.76Aw
400 metres	Anderson Jorge dos Santos; Brazil	45.39A CR	John Mena; Colombia	46.16A	Inácio Leão Filho; Brazil	46.18A
800 metres	Hudson de Souza; Brazil	1:49.82A	Flavio Godoy; Brazil	1:50.00A	José Luis Hincapié; Colombia	1:51.11A
1500 metres	Mauricio Ladino; Colombia	3:49.95A	Márcio da Silva; Brazil	3:51.38A	Alonso Pérez; Colombia	3:51.51A
5000 metres	Silvio Guerra; Ecuador	14:20.35A	Franklin Tenorio; Ecuador	14:34.21A	Valdenor dos Santos; Brazil	14:37.75A
10,000 metres	Silvio Guerra; Ecuador	30:30.20A	Vicente Chura; Peru	30:55.24A	Franklin Tenorio; Ecuador	30:57.12A
3000 metres steeplechase	Pablo Ramírez; Ecuador	9:11.21A	Giovanni Morejón; Bolivia	9:16.10A	Diego Grisales; Colombia	9:19.79A
110 metres hurdles	Luiz André Balcers; Brazil	13.76A CR	Paulo Villar; Colombia	14.31A	Márcio de Souza; Brazil	14.37A
400 metres hurdles	Eronilde de Araújo; Brazil	49.13A	Cleverson da Silva; Brazil	49.50A	Llimy Rivas; Colombia	50.41A
4 × 100 metres relay	Brazil; Raphael de Oliveira; Claudinei da Silva; Édson Ribeiro; André da Silva	38.46A CR	Argentina; Iván Altamirano; Gabriel Simón; Guillermo Cacián; Carlos Gats	39.96A	Chile; Ricardo Roach; Fabián Aguilera; Rodrigo Roach; Juan Pablo Faúndez	39.98A
4 × 400 metres relay	Brazil; Eronilde de Araújo; Anderson Jorge dos Santos; Inácio Leão Filho; Cleverson da Silva	3:02.09A CR	Colombia; John Mena; Llimy Rivas; Alexander Mena; Julio César Rojas	3:04.52A	Argentina; Gustavo Aguirre; Carlos Gats; Guillermo Cacián; Damián Spector	3:08.53A
20000 metres track walk	Sérgio Galdino; Brazil	1:31:01.68A	Nixon Zambrano; Colombia	1:32:49.76A	Mário dos Santos; Brazil	1:33:50.59A
High jump	Fabrício Romero; Brazil	2.26A =CR	Gilmar Mayo; Colombia	2.26A	Erasmo Jara; Argentina	2.21A
Pole vault	Ricardo Diez; Venezuela	5.20A	Javier Benítez; Argentina	5.00A	Cristián Aspillaga; Chile	5.00A
Long jump	Lewis Asprilla; Colombia	7.96A	Cláudio Novaes; Brazil	7.78A	Sérgio dos Santos; Brazil	7.77A
Triple jump	Anísio Silva; Brazil	16.48A	Johnny Rodríguez; Venezuela	16.45Aw	Sérgio dos Santos; Brazil	16.20A
Shot put	Édson Miguel; Brazil	17.86A	Marco Antonio Verni; Chile	17.83A	Jhonny Rodríguez; Colombia	16.97A
Discus throw	Marcelo Pugliese; Argentina	59.23A	Julio Piñero; Argentina	57.92A	João dos Santos; Brazil	55.82A
Hammer throw	Juan Cerra; Argentina	72.09A CR	Eduardo Acuña; Peru	64.52A	Adrián Marzo; Argentina	64.09A
Javelin throw	Nery Kennedy; Paraguay	78.89A CR	Luis Lucumí; Colombia	73.58A	Luiz Fernando da Silva; Brazil	73.57A
Decathlon	Santiago Lorenzo; Argentina	7344A	Édson Bindilatti; Brazil	7196A	Diógenes Estévez; Venezuela	7135A
WR world record | AR area record | CR championship record | GR games record | NR national record | OR Olympic record | PB personal best | SB season best | WL world leading (in a given season)

=== Women's events ===
Event	Gold		Silver		Bronze	
100 metres	Lucimar de Moura; Brazil	11.17A CR	Mirtha Brock; Colombia	11.44A	Kátia de Jesus Santos; Brazil	11.59A
200 metres	Lucimar de Moura; Brazil	22.60A CR	Felipa Palacios; Colombia	22.97A	Cleide Amaral; Brazil	23.74A
400 metres	Norfalia Carabalí; Colombia	52.92A	Ana Paula Pereira; Brazil	53.56A	Lorena de Oliveira; Brazil	54.73A
800 metres	Luciana Mendes; Brazil	2:05.62A	Janeth Lucumí; Colombia	2:06.51A	Marlene Moreira; Brazil	2:08.70A
1500 metres	Bertha Sánchez; Colombia	4:35.72A	Fabiana Cristine da Silva; Brazil	4:37.68A	Célia dos Santos; Brazil	4:41.73A
5000 metres	Stella Castro; Colombia	16:45.63A	Bertha Sánchez; Colombia	17:02.89A	Érika Olivera; Chile	17:15.17A
10,000 metres	Stella Castro; Colombia	34:30.92A	Érika Olivera; Chile	34:45.70A	Sonia Calizaya; Bolivia	36:17.45A
100 metres hurdles	Maurren Maggi; Brazil	13.05A CR	Verónica Depaoli; Argentina	13.45A	Princesa Oliveros; Colombia	13.49A
400 metres hurdles	Ana Paula Pereira; Brazil	58.06A	Luciana França; Brazil	58.55A	Princesa Oliveros; Colombia	58.77A
4 × 100 metres relay	Colombia; Mirtha Brock; Felipa Palacios; Patricia Rodríguez; Norfalia Carabalí	44.12A CR	Ecuador; Martha González; Maritza Valencia; Zulay Nazareno; Ondina Rodríguez	48.13A		
4 × 400 metres relay	Colombia; Patricia Rodríguez; Norma González; Mirtha Brock; Norfalia Carabalí	3:32.74A	Brazil; Ana Paula Pereira; Lorena de Oliveira; Luciana Mendes; Luciana França	3:37.88A	Ecuador; Martiza Valencia; Zulay Nazareno; Mercy Colorado; Ondina Rodríguez	3:49.05A
20000 metres track walk	Miriam Ramón; Ecuador	1:39:27.0A CR	Geovana Irusta; Bolivia	1:39:42.0A	Cristina Bohórquez; Colombia	1:43:49.5A
High jump	Luciane Dambacher; Brazil	1.87A	Glaucia da Silva; Brazil	1.81A	Catherine Ibargüen; Colombia	1.76A
Pole vault	Alejandra García; Argentina	4.30A CR	Déborah Gyurcsek; Uruguay	3.75A	Fabiana Murer; Brazil	3.70A
Long jump	Maurren Maggi; Brazil	7.26A CR	Luciana dos Santos; Brazil	6.81A	Gilda Massa; Peru	6.68Aw
Triple jump	Luciana dos Santos; Brazil	13.90A	Mónica Falcioni; Uruguay	13.57A	Andrea Ávila; Argentina	13.57A
Shot put	Elisângela Adriano; Brazil	19.02A CR	Alexandra Amaro; Brazil	15.21A	Marianne Berndt; Chile	15.00A
Discus throw	Elisângela Adriano; Brazil	60.27A CR	Luz Dary Castro; Colombia	50.95A	Liliana Martinelli; Argentina	49.11A
Hammer throw	Karina Moya; Argentina	60.69A CR	María Eugenia Villamizar; Colombia	58.26A	Josiane Soares; Brazil	57.23A
Javelin throw (Current design)	Sabina Moya; Colombia	58.81A CR	Sueli dos Santos; Brazil	58.16A	Zuleima Araméndiz; Colombia	55.77A
Heptathlon	Euzinete dos Reis; Brazil	5741A	Elizete da Silva; Brazil	5669A	Flor Robledo; Colombia	5474A
WR world record | AR area record | CR championship record | GR games record | NR national record | OR Olympic record | PB personal best | SB season best | WL world leading (in a given season)

A = affected by altitude

== Medal table ==
Rank	Nation	Gold	Silver	Bronze	Total
1	Brazil	23	14	15	52
2	Colombia	8	12	11	31
3	Argentina	5	4	5	14
4	Ecuador	4	2	2	8
5	Chile	1	4	4	9
6	Venezuela	1	1	1	3
7	Paraguay	1	0	0	1
8	Uruguay	0	2	2	4
9	Bolivia	0	2	1	3
9	Peru	0	2	1	3
Totals (10 entries)		43	43	42	128

== Participation ==
- Angola (1) – guest
- Argentina (26)
- Bolivia (4)
- Brazil (65)
- Chile (25)
- Colombia (59)
- Ecuador (23)
- Panama (4)
- Paraguay (1)
- Peru (17)
- Uruguay (12)
- Venezuela (23)

== See also ==
- 1999 in athletics (track and field)
