= Robinson Urrutia =

Colombian sprinter (born 1969)

Personal information
- Born: 19 February 1969 (age 56)

Sport
- Sport: Athletics
- Event: 100 meters

Robinson Urrutia (born 19 February 1969) is a retired Colombian sprinter. He represented his country in the 60 metres at the 1995 World Indoor Championships without advancing from the first round.

== International competitions ==
Year	Competition	Venue	Position	Event	Notes
Representing Colombia
1989	Bolivarian Games	Maracaibo, Venezuela	4th	100 m	10.69 (w)
1989	Bolivarian Games	Maracaibo, Venezuela	2nd	4 × 100 m relay	40.91
1989	South American Championships	Medellín, Colombia	6th	100 m	10.6
1989	South American Championships	Medellín, Colombia	2nd	4 × 100 m relay	39.87
1991	South American Championships	Manaus, Brazil	5th	100 m	10.66
1992	Ibero-American Championships	Seville, Spain	15th (h)	100 m	10.87
1992	Ibero-American Championships	Seville, Spain	5th	4 × 100 m relay	40.50
1993	Bolivarian Games	Cochabamba, Bolivia	6th	100 m	10.67
1993	Bolivarian Games	Cochabamba, Bolivia	1st	4 × 100 m relay	39.96
1993	Bolivarian Games	Cochabamba, Bolivia	1st	4 × 400 m relay	3:10.51
1993	South American Championships	Lima, Peru	9th (h)	100 m	11.17
1993	South American Championships	Lima, Peru	2nd	4 × 400 m relay	3:09.1
1993	Central American and Caribbean Championships	Cali, Colombia	3rd	4 × 400 m relay	3:06.39
1994	Ibero-American Championships	Mar del Plata, Argentina	11th (h)	100 m	11.08
1994	Ibero-American Championships	Mar del Plata, Argentina	3rd	4 × 100 m relay	40.79
1994	Ibero-American Championships	Mar del Plata, Argentina	3rd	4 × 400 m relay	3:08.24
1994	South American Games	Valencia, Venezuela	1st	100 m	10.29
1994	South American Games	Valencia, Venezuela	5th	200 m	21.1
1994	South American Games	Valencia, Venezuela	3rd	4 × 100 m relay	40.32
1995	World Indoor Championships	Barcelona, Spain	36th (h)	60 m	6.89
1995	South American Championships	Manaus, Brazil	5th	100 m	10.61
1995	South American Championships	Manaus, Brazil	2nd	4 × 100 m relay	40.31
1995	South American Championships	Manaus, Brazil	2nd	4 × 400 m relay	3:10.16
1995	Central American and Caribbean Championships	Guatemala City, Guatemala	3rd	4 × 100 m relay	39.65
1996	Ibero-American Championships	Medellín, Colombia	6th (extra)	100 m	10.6
1996	Ibero-American Championships	Medellín, Colombia	4th	4 × 100 m relay	40.62
1997	South American Championships	Mar del Plata, Argentina	5th (h)	100 m	10.53^{1}
1997	South American Championships	Mar del Plata, Argentina	4th	4 × 100 m relay	41.36
1997	Bolivarian Games	Arequipa, Peru	2nd	100 m	10.54
2003	South American Championships	Barquisimeto, Venezuela	5th	Decathlon	5967 pts

^{1}Disqualified in the final

== Personal bests ==
Outdoor

- 100 meters – 10.29 (+0.4 m/s, Valencia 1994)
- 200 meters – 21.47 (+1.0 m/s, Medellín 1997)

Indoor

- 60 meters – 6.89 (Barcelona 1995)
