= Tuimoloau =

Tuimoloau is a surname. Notable people with it include:

- Dolores Tuimoloau (1976–2011), American Samoan athlete
- JT Tuimoloau (born 2003), American football player
