= Messias Baptista =

Messias Baptista may refer to:

- Messias José Baptista (1968–2005), Brazilian athlete
- Messias Baptista (canoeist) (born 1999), Portuguese sprint canoeist
