= 1993 South American Championships in Athletics – Results =

These are the results of the 1993 South American Championships in Athletics which took place at the Villa Deportiva Nacional in Lima, Peru, on 2, 3 and 4 July.

== Men's results ==
=== 100 metres ===
Heats – 2 July
Wind:
Heat 1: -3.2 m/s, Heat 2: -4.1 m/s

Rank	Heat	Name	Nationality	Time	Notes
1	2	Arnaldo da Silva	Brazil	10.82	Q
2	2	Carlos Bernardo Moreno	Chile	10.88	Q
3	1	Robson da Silva	Brazil	10.89	Q
4	1	Óscar Fernández	Peru	10.90	Q
5	1	Sebastián Keitel	Chile	10.93	Q
6	2	John Mena	Colombia	11.03	Q
7	2	Carlos Gats	Argentina	11.04	q
8	1	Richard Kristen	Venezuela	11.12	q
9	1	Wenceslao Ferrín	Colombia	11.17	
10	2	Jorge Cañizales	Venezuela	11.23	
11	2	Jaime Verme	Peru	11.27	
12	2	Dick Perlaza	Ecuador	11.39	
13	1	Danilo Almeida	Ecuador	11.56	

Final – 2 July

Wind: -4.6 m/s

Rank	Name	Nationality	Time	Notes
1st place, gold medalist(s)	Robson da Silva	Brazil	10.58	
2nd place, silver medalist(s)	Arnaldo da Silva	Brazil	10.69	
3rd place, bronze medalist(s)	Óscar Fernández	Peru	10.73	
4	Carlos Bernardo Moreno	Chile	10.92	
5	Sebastián Keitel	Chile	10.95	
6	Carlos Gats	Argentina	10.97	
7	John Mena	Colombia	10.98	
8	Richard Kristen	Venezuela	11.20	

=== 200 metres ===
Heats – 3 July
Wind:
Heat 1: -3.4 m/s, Heat 2: -2.9 m/s

Rank	Heat	Name	Nationality	Time	Notes
1	1	André Domingos	Brazil	21.5	Q
2	1	Sebastián Keitel	Chile	21.6	Q
3	1	Carlos Gats	Argentina	21.7	Q
4	1	Luis Alfonso Vega	Colombia	21.9	q
5	1	Dick Perlaza	Ecuador	22.1	q
6	1	Jorge Cañizales	Venezuela	22.3	
7	1	Jaime Verme	Peru	22.9	
1	2	Robson da Silva	Brazil	21.2	Q
2	2	Wilson Cañizales	Colombia	21.6	Q
3	2	Carlos Bernardo Moreno	Chile	21.6	Q
4	2	Richard Kristen	Venezuela	22.3	
5	2	Danilo Almeida	Ecuador	22.5	

Final – 3 July

Wind: -2.3 m/s

Rank	Name	Nationality	Time	Notes
1st place, gold medalist(s)	Robson da Silva	Brazil	20.9	
2nd place, silver medalist(s)	André Domingos	Brazil	21.1	
3rd place, bronze medalist(s)	Wilson Cañizales	Colombia	21.3	
4	Carlos Bernardo Moreno	Chile	21.4	
5	Sebastián Keitel	Chile	21.4	
6	Carlos Gats	Argentina	21.4	
7	Luis Alfonso Vega	Colombia	21.9	
8	Dick Perlaza	Ecuador	22.7	

=== 400 metres ===
2 July

Rank	Name	Nationality	Time	Notes
1st place, gold medalist(s)	Wilson Cañizales	Colombia	46.5	
2nd place, silver medalist(s)	Inaldo Sena	Brazil	45.7	
3rd place, bronze medalist(s)	Alejandro Krauss	Chile	47.6	
4	Carlos Morales	Chile	47.8	
5	Julio Cruz	Peru	49.1	
6	Dick Perlaza	Ecuador	50.2	
7	Danilo Almeida	Ecuador	50.5	

=== 800 metres ===
3 July

Rank	Name	Nationality	Time	Notes
1st place, gold medalist(s)	Pablo Squella	Chile	1:51.98	
2nd place, silver medalist(s)	Luis Migueles	Argentina	1:52.12	
3rd place, bronze medalist(s)	Peter Gross	Chile	1:52.24	
4	Geraldo de Assis	Brazil	1:52.45	
5	Italo Mejía	Peru	1:53.56	
6	Isaac Espinoza	Peru	1:53.62	
7	Mark Olivo	Venezuela	1:54.04	
8	Efren Ycaza	Ecuador	1:56.06	
9	Alfredo Peredo	Bolivia	1:58.15	

=== 1500 metres ===
4 July

Rank	Name	Nationality	Time	Notes
1st place, gold medalist(s)	Adauto Domingues	Brazil	3:46.4	
2nd place, silver medalist(s)	Pablo Squella	Chile	3:51.0	
3rd place, bronze medalist(s)	Marcelo Cascabelo	Argentina	3:51.5	
4	Luis Migueles	Argentina	3:54.9	
5	Isaac Espinoza	Peru	3:55.2	
6	Peter Gross	Chile	3:55.7	
7	Mark Olivo	Venezuela	3:57.7	
8	Italo Mejía	Peru	3:58.2	

=== 5000 metres ===
2 July

Rank	Name	Nationality	Time	Notes
1st place, gold medalist(s)	Ronaldo da Costa	Brazil	13:58.7	
2nd place, silver medalist(s)	Valdenor dos Santos	Brazil	13:59.6	
3rd place, bronze medalist(s)	José Castillo	Peru	13:59.9	
4	Mauricio Díaz	Chile	14:20.0	
5	René Colque	Bolivia	14:20.2	
6	Mariano Mamani	Bolivia	14:20.3	
7	Néstor Quinapanta	Ecuador	14:33.8	
8	Franklin Tenorio	Ecuador	14:35.0	
9	Waldemar Cotelo	Uruguay	14:46.0	
10	William Roldán	Colombia	14:49.9	
11	Roger Soler	Peru	14:53.1	

=== 10,000 metres ===
3 July

Rank	Name	Nationality	Time	Notes
1st place, gold medalist(s)	Antonio Silio	Argentina	28:37.2	CR
2nd place, silver medalist(s)	José Castillo	Peru	28:56.8	
3rd place, bronze medalist(s)	Valdenor dos Santos	Brazil	29:20.04	
4	Néstor Quinapanta	Ecuador	29:41.7	
5	Juan Pablo Juárez	Argentina	29:54.2	
6	Mauricio Díaz	Chile	29:58.8	
7	Policarpio Calizaya	Bolivia	30:03.1	
8	Waldemar Cotelo	Uruguay	30:08.8	
9	Edy Punina	Ecuador	30:25.3	

=== 110 metres hurdles ===
Heats – 3 July
Wind:
Heat 1: -4.0 m/s, Heat 2: -2.5 m/s

Rank	Heat	Name	Nationality	Time	Notes
1	1	Pedro Chiamulera	Brazil	14.4	Q
2	1	Ricardo D'Andrilli	Argentina	14.7	Q
3	1	Omar Triviño	Ecuador	15.0	Q
4	1	Telmo Arrué	Peru	15.7	q
1	2	Joilto Bonfim	Brazil	14.4	Q
2	2	Oscar Ratto	Argentina	14.7	Q
3	2	Eliexer Pulgar	Venezuela	14.7	Q
4	2	Marco Mina	Peru	14.8	q

Final – 4 July

Wind: -2.6 m/s

Rank	Name	Nationality	Time	Notes
1st place, gold medalist(s)	Pedro Chiamulera	Brazil	14.30	
2nd place, silver medalist(s)	Joilto Bonfim	Brazil	14.38	
3rd place, bronze medalist(s)	Ricardo D'Andrilli	Argentina	14.75	
4	Marco Mina	Peru	14.82	
5	Omar Triviño	Ecuador	14.94	
6	Eliexer Pulgar	Venezuela	14.97	
7	Oscar Ratto	Argentina	15.06	
8	Telmo Arrué	Peru	15.63	

=== 400 metres hurdles ===
Heats – 2 July

Rank	Heat	Name	Nationality	Time	Notes
1	1	Eronilde de Araújo	Brazil	50.4	Q
2	1	Llimy Rivas	Colombia	51.5	Q
3	1	Víctor Mendoza	Peru	51.9	Q
4	1	Nicolás Majluf	Chile	55.9	
5	1	Omar Triviño	Peru	57.3	
1	2	Pedro Chiamulera	Brazil	52.2	Q
2	2	Antonio Smith	Venezuela	52.3	Q
3	2	Mauro Mina	Peru	52.4	Q
4	2	Juan Zapata	Chile	53.8	q
5	2	Miguel Pérez	Argentina	54.2	q
6	2	Byron Lasierra	Ecuador	55.0	

Final – 3 July

Rank	Name	Nationality	Time	Notes
1st place, gold medalist(s)	Eronilde de Araújo	Brazil	49.8	
2nd place, silver medalist(s)	Pedro Chiamulera	Brazil	50.1	
3rd place, bronze medalist(s)	Llimy Rivas	Colombia	50.7	
4	Antonio Smith	Venezuela	51.0	
5	Mauro Mina	Peru	51.6	
6	Víctor Mendoza	Peru	51.8	
7	Miguel Pérez	Argentina	53.5	
8	Juan Zapata	Chile	53.6	

=== 3000 metres steeplechase ===
3 July

Rank	Name	Nationality	Time	Notes
1st place, gold medalist(s)	Adauto Domingues	Brazil	8:36.9	
2nd place, silver medalist(s)	Marcelo Cascabelo	Argentina	8:38.8	
3rd place, bronze medalist(s)	Oscar Amaya	Argentina	8:48.9	
4	Jaime Valenzuela	Chile	8:59.7	
5	Franklin Tenorio	Ecuador	9:00.1	
6	Silvano Simeon	Peru	9:06.1	
7	Jaime Cáceres	Peru	9:18.4	

=== 4 × 100 metres relay ===
2 July

Rank	Nation	Competitors	Time	Notes
1st place, gold medalist(s)	Chile	Juan Francisco Cobo, Álvaro Prenafeta, Sebastián Keitel, Carlos Bernardo Moreno	40.2	
2nd place, silver medalist(s)	Peru	Óscar Fernández, Marco Mautino, Javier Verme, José Uribe	41.2	
3rd place, bronze medalist(s)	Venezuela	Richard Kristen, Ángel Tovar, Abraham Abreu, Jorge Cañizales	41.4	
4	Ecuador	Dick Perlaza, Byron Casierra, Danilo Almeida, Omar Triviño	43.7	
	Brazil		DNF	

=== 4 × 400 metres relay ===
4 July

Rank	Nation	Competitors	Time	Notes
1st place, gold medalist(s)	Brazil	Pedro Chiamulera, Geraldo de Assis, Inaldo Sena, Eronilde de Araújo	3:09.0	
2nd place, silver medalist(s)	Colombia	Luis Alfonso Vega, Wenceslao Ferrín, Llimy Rivas, Wilson Cañizales	3:09.1	
3rd place, bronze medalist(s)	Chile	Álvaro Prenafeta, Carlos Morales, Sebastián Keitel, Alejandro Krauss	3:09.5	
4	Peru	Piero Chichizola, Mauro Mina, Víctor Mendoza, Julio Cruz	3:15.0	
5	Ecuador	Efren Ycaza, Dick Perlaza, Freddy Nieves, Danilo Almeida	3:25.2	

=== 20 kilometres walk ===
4 July

Rank	Name	Nationality	Time	Notes
1st place, gold medalist(s)	Jefferson Pérez	Ecuador	1:24:31	
2nd place, silver medalist(s)	Querubín Moreno	Colombia	1:24:50	
3rd place, bronze medalist(s)	Orlando Díaz	Colombia	1:26:57	
4	Benjamín Loréfice	Argentina	1:29:47	
5	Eloy Quispe	Bolivia	1:30:02	
6	Juan Sandy	Bolivia	1:30:11	
7	Nelson Rocha	Brazil	1:30:17	
8	Jorge Loréfice	Argentina	1:33:26	
9	Sergio Quispe	Peru	1:42:32	

=== High jump ===
4 July

Rank	Name	Nationality	Result	Notes
1st place, gold medalist(s)	Hugo Muñoz	Peru	2.22	CR
2nd place, silver medalist(s)	Fernando Moreno	Argentina	2.16	
3rd place, bronze medalist(s)	José Luis Mendes	Brazil	2.16	
4	Gilmar Mayo	Colombia	2.13	
5	Ricardo D'Andrilli	Argentina	2.10	
6	Marcos dos Santos	Brazil	2.10	
7	Valery Abugattas	Peru	2.10	
8	Giovanny Gudiño	Ecuador	2.00	

=== Pole vault ===
3 July

Rank	Name	Nationality	Result	Notes
1st place, gold medalist(s)	Oscar Veit	Argentina	4.95	
2nd place, silver medalist(s)	Fernando Pastoriza	Argentina	4.80	
3rd place, bronze medalist(s)	Cristián Aspillaga	Chile	4.70	
4	Marlon Borges	Brazil	4.60	
5	Igor Castillo	Peru	4.60	
6	Ricardo Diez	Venezuela	4.60	
7	Dean Torres	Ecuador	4.30	
8	Mauricio Ordoñez	Ecuador	4.30	

=== Long jump ===
3 July

Rank	Name	Nationality	Result	Notes
1st place, gold medalist(s)	Paulo de Oliveira	Brazil	7.99w	
2nd place, silver medalist(s)	Abraham Abreu	Venezuela	7.60	
3rd place, bronze medalist(s)	Ricardo Valiente	Peru	7.38w	
4	Ángel Tovar	Venezuela	7.35w	
5	Oscar Valiente	Peru	7.29w	
6	Anísio Silva	Brazil	7.27	
7	Jon Araneda	Chile	7.10w	
8	Ramiro Villarroel	Bolivia	6.91w	

=== Triple jump ===
2 July

Rank	Name	Nationality	Result	Notes
1st place, gold medalist(s)	Anísio Silva	Brazil	17.21	CR
2nd place, silver medalist(s)	Ricardo Valiente	Peru	16.45	
3rd place, bronze medalist(s)	Avelino de Souza	Brazil	16.31	
4	Freddy Nieves	Ecuador	16.24	
5	Carlos Atencio	Peru	16.16	
6	Sergio Saavedra	Venezuela	15.96	
7	Miguel Padrón	Venezuela	15.89	
8	Byron Casierra	Ecuador	14.87	

=== Shot put ===
2 July

Rank	Name	Nationality	Result	Notes
1st place, gold medalist(s)	Adilson Oliveira	Brazil	17.88	
2nd place, silver medalist(s)	Yojer Medina	Venezuela	17.52	
3rd place, bronze medalist(s)	João dos Santos	Brazil	16.76	
4	Andrés Charadía	Argentina	16.03	
5	Gabriel Allende	Argentina	15.63	
6	Daniel Duharte	Peru	14.17	

=== Discus throw ===
3 July

Rank	Name	Nationality	Result	Notes
1st place, gold medalist(s)	Ramón Jiménez Gaona	Paraguay	59.46	CR
2nd place, silver medalist(s)	João dos Santos	Brazil	55.28	
3rd place, bronze medalist(s)	Yojer Medina	Venezuela	52.90	
4	Marcelo Pugliese	Argentina	51.02	
5	Rogelio Ospino	Colombia	48.98	
6	Carlos Cáceres	Chile	47.20	
7	Juan Tello	Peru	45.14	
8	Gabriel Allende	Argentina	44.76	
9	Gianni Deza	Peru	37.76	

=== Hammer throw ===
2 July

Rank	Name	Nationality	Result	Notes
1st place, gold medalist(s)	Andrés Charadía	Argentina	71.14	CR
2nd place, silver medalist(s)	Marcelo Pugliese	Argentina	67.36	
3rd place, bronze medalist(s)	José Llano	Chile	57.44	
4	Eduardo Acuña	Peru	56.50	
5	Luis García	Ecuador	50.66	
6	José Vergara	Peru	45.00	
7	David Bustillo	Bolivia	43.46	

=== Javelin throw ===
4 July

Rank	Name	Nationality	Result	Notes
1st place, gold medalist(s)	Rodrigo Zelaya	Chile	72.86	
2nd place, silver medalist(s)	Luiz Fernando da Silva	Brazil	70.56	
3rd place, bronze medalist(s)	Ivan Costa	Brazil	68.48	
4	Pablo Frutos	Chile	66.44	
5	Michael Musselman	Peru	63.82	
6	Ricardo Valiente	Peru	59.44	
7	Eddy Quiñones	Ecuador	45.24	

=== Decathlon ===
2–3 July

The highest mark recorded in each event is highlighted in yellow

Rank	Athlete	Nationality	100m	LJ	SP	HJ	400m	110m H	DT	PV	JT	1500m	Points	Notes
1st place, gold medalist(s)	José de Assis	Brazil	11.3	6.55	13.01	1.85	50.3	15.5	38.92	3.80	53.56	4:14.9	6861	
2nd place, silver medalist(s)	Edemar dos Santos	Brazil	11.6	6.42	11.54	1.82	49.8	15.8	35.44	3.60	49.74	4:26.6	6598	
3rd place, bronze medalist(s)	Arturo Rodríguez	Chile	11.4	7.18	10.40	2.00	51.8	14.9	25.20	3.00	42.10	4:32.7	6381	
4	Alexis Recioy	Uruguay	11.1	6.90	10.49	1.79	49.7	16.4	30.92	3.80	42.84	4:43.6	6380	
5	Moisés del Castillo	Peru	11.4	6.21	9.97	1.82	50.0	16.6	30.56	3.00	41.41	4:50.6	5838	
6	Juan Velarde	Peru	12.1	6.13	10.93	1.55	52.5	15.2	31.44	3.80	39.52	4:39.2	5261	
	Quiñónez	Ecuador	11.4	6.86	11.90	1.82	53.2	16.9	32.14	DNS	–	–	DNF	

== Women's results ==
=== 100 metres ===
Heats – 3 July
Wind:
Heat 1: -4.0 m/s, Heat 2: -3.2 m/s

Rank	Heat	Name	Nationality	Time	Notes
1	1	Patricia Rodríguez	Colombia	11.8	Q
2	1	Kátia Regina Santos	Brazil	12.1	Q
3	1	Daniela Lebreo	Argentina	12.3	Q
4	1	Judith de la Fuente	Chile	12.5	q
5	1	Ana Caicedo	Ecuador	12.7	q
6	1	Patricia Vargas	Peru	12.9	
1	2	Cleide Amaral	Brazil	12.2	Q
2	2	Virginia Lebreo	Argentina	12.3	Q
3	2	Lisette Rondón	Chile	12.4	Q
4	2	Rocío de la Cruz	Peru	12.8	

Final – 4 July

Wind: -2.9 m/s

Rank	Name	Nationality	Time	Notes
1st place, gold medalist(s)	Cleide Amaral	Brazil	11.91	
2nd place, silver medalist(s)	Patricia Rodríguez	Colombia	12.10	
3rd place, bronze medalist(s)	Kátia Regina Santos	Brazil	12.22	
4	Daniela Lebreo	Argentina	12.37	
5	Virginia Lebreo	Argentina	12.44	
6	Lisette Rondón	Chile	12.50	
7	Judith de la Fuente	Chile	12.51	
8	Ana Caicedo	Ecuador	12.89	

=== 200 metres ===
Heats – 2 July
Wind:
Heat 1: -3.5 m/s, Heat 2: -5.2 m/s

Rank	Heat	Name	Nationality	Time	Notes
1	1	Daniela Lebreo	Argentina	24.6	Q
2	1	Kátia Regina Santos	Brazil	24.8	Q
3	1	Judith de la Fuente	Chile	25.4	Q
4	1	Ana Caicedo	Ecuador	25.9	q
5	1	Patricia Vargas	Peru	26.5	q
1	2	Patricia Rodríguez	Colombia	24.9	Q
2	2	Olga Conte	Argentina	25.2	Q
3	2	Lisette Rondón	Chile	25.7	Q
4	2	Samantha Sánchez	Peru	26.5	

Final – 3 July

Wind: -3.4 m/s

Rank	Name	Nationality	Time	Notes
1st place, gold medalist(s)	Patricia Rodríguez	Colombia	24.2	
2nd place, silver medalist(s)	Kátia Regina Santos	Brazil	24.6	
3rd place, bronze medalist(s)	Olga Conte	Argentina	24.7	
4	Daniela Lebreo	Argentina	24.9	
5	Lisette Rondón	Chile	25.0	
6	Judith de la Fuente	Chile	25.1	
7	Ana Caicedo	Ecuador	26.1	
8	Patricia Vargas	Peru	26.4	

=== 400 metres ===
4 July

Rank	Name	Nationality	Time	Notes
1st place, gold medalist(s)	Maria Magnólia Figueiredo	Brazil	52.67	
2nd place, silver medalist(s)	Luciana Mendes	Brazil	53.06	
3rd place, bronze medalist(s)	Sara Montecinos	Chile	53.73	
4	Marcela Barros	Chile	57.37	
5	Paola Vargas	Peru	1:02.42	

=== 800 metres ===
2 July

Rank	Name	Nationality	Time	Notes
1st place, gold medalist(s)	Maria Magnólia Figueiredo	Brazil	2:04.4	
2nd place, silver medalist(s)	Luciana Mendes	Brazil	2:04.5	
3rd place, bronze medalist(s)	Sara Montecinos	Chile	2:06.4	
4	Miriam Achote	Ecuador	2:18.2	
5	Patricia Martínez	Peru	2:19.6	
6	Julia Rivera	Peru	2:25.5	

=== 1500 metres ===
4 July

Rank	Name	Nationality	Time	Notes
1st place, gold medalist(s)	Soraya Telles	Brazil	4:23.1	
2nd place, silver medalist(s)	Alejandra Ramos	Chile	4:31.4	
3rd place, bronze medalist(s)	Miriam Achote	Ecuador	4:31.9	
4	Martha Tenorio	Ecuador	4:38.5	
5	Marlene Flores	Chile	4:44.1	
6	Nemia Coca	Bolivia	5:10.7	

=== 3000 metres ===
3 July

Rank	Name	Nationality	Time	Notes
1st place, gold medalist(s)	Marilú Salazar	Peru	9:44.9	
2nd place, silver medalist(s)	Griselda González	Argentina	9:45.5	
3rd place, bronze medalist(s)	Alejandra Ramos	Chile	9:52.1	
4	Martha Tenorio	Ecuador	9:59.3	
5	Yolanda Quimbita	Ecuador	10:00.4	
6	Marlene Flores	Chile	10:02.4	

=== 10,000 metres ===
2 July

Rank	Name	Nationality	Time	Notes
1st place, gold medalist(s)	Carmem de Oliveira	Brazil	33:49.8	
2nd place, silver medalist(s)	Marilú Salazar	Peru	33:57.8	
3rd place, bronze medalist(s)	Martha Tenorio	Ecuador	34:04.4	
4	Marlene Flores	Chile	35:03.8	
5	Yolanda Quimbita	Ecuador	35:50.4	
6	Marta Orellana	Argentina	36:20.9	
7	Vidalina Jaime	Peru	37:47.5	
8	Nemia Coca	Bolivia	39:08.8	

=== 100 metres hurdles ===
4 July
Wind: -2.5 m/s

Rank	Name	Nationality	Time	Notes
1st place, gold medalist(s)	Vânia Regina dos Santos	Brazil	14.26	
2nd place, silver medalist(s)	Vânia Maria da Silva	Brazil	14.28	
3rd place, bronze medalist(s)	Anabella von Kesselstatt	Argentina	14.30	
4	Gilda Massa	Peru	14.48	
5	Alejandra Martínez	Chile	14.52	
6	Ivette Sánchez	Panama	15.66	
7	Rocío Martínez	Ecuador	16.69	

=== 400 metres hurdles ===
3 July

Rank	Name	Nationality	Time	Notes
1st place, gold medalist(s)	Anabella von Kesselstatt	Argentina	57.2	
2nd place, silver medalist(s)	Jupira da Graça	Brazil	57.4	
3rd place, bronze medalist(s)	Tatiana Espinosa	Peru	1:05.8	
4	Rocío Martínez	Ecuador	1:11.6	

=== 4 × 100 metres relay ===
4 July

Rank	Nation	Competitors	Time	Notes
1st place, gold medalist(s)	Brazil	Kátia Regina Santos, Jupira da Graça, Vânia Regina dos Santos, Cleide Amaral	45.1	
2nd place, silver medalist(s)	Argentina	Virginia Lebreo, Olga Conte, Daniela Lebreo, Anabella von Kesselstatt	45.9	
3rd place, bronze medalist(s)	Chile	Alejandra Martínez, Lisette Rondón, Judith de la Fuente, Sara Montecinos	46.5	
4	Peru	Samantha Sánchez, Rocío de la Cruz, Patricia Vargas, Gilda Massa	48.4	

=== 4 × 400 metres relay ===
3 July

Rank	Nation	Competitors	Time	Notes
1st place, gold medalist(s)	Brazil	Luciana Mendes, Soraya Telles, Jupira da Graça, Maria Magnólia Figueiredo	3:36.49	
2nd place, silver medalist(s)	Argentina	Virginia Lebreo, Olga Conte, Daniela Lebreo, Anabella von Kesselstatt	3:43.42	
3rd place, bronze medalist(s)	Chile	Marcela Barros, Hannelore Grosser, Lisette Rondón, Sara Montecinos	3:43.43	
4	Peru	Paola Nuñez, Tatiana Espinosa, Julia Rivera, Patricia Martínez	4:11.68	

=== 10,000 metres walk ===
3 July

Rank	Name	Nationality	Time	Notes
1st place, gold medalist(s)	Miriam Ramón	Ecuador	48:18.0	CR
2nd place, silver medalist(s)	Geovana Irusta	Bolivia	53:06.5	
3rd place, bronze medalist(s)	Giovanna Morejón	Bolivia	57:45.6	
4	Ruth Tenicela	Peru	1:01:06.0	
5	Brenda Astudillo	Peru	1:06:10.0	

=== High jump ===
2 July

Rank	Name	Nationality	Result	Notes
1st place, gold medalist(s)	Orlane dos Santos	Brazil	1.87	
2nd place, silver medalist(s)	Alejandra García	Argentina	1.84	
3rd place, bronze medalist(s)	María Alejandra Chomali	Chile	1.75	
4	Marlene Montano	Bolivia	1.60	

=== Long jump ===
3 July

Rank	Name	Nationality	Result	Notes
1st place, gold medalist(s)	Andrea Ávila	Argentina	6.45w	
2nd place, silver medalist(s)	Maria de Souza	Brazil	6.26	
3rd place, bronze medalist(s)	Gilda Massa	Peru	6.00w	
4	Alejandra García	Argentina	5.81w	
5	Graciela Acosta	Uruguay	5.79w	
6	Ana Caicedo	Ecuador	5.57w	
7	Mariana Prazuela	Venezuela	5.55w	
8	Rocío Cabrera	Uruguay	5.53w	

=== Triple jump ===
4 July

Rank	Name	Nationality	Result	Notes
1st place, gold medalist(s)	Andrea Ávila	Argentina	13.91	AR
2nd place, silver medalist(s)	Maria de Souza	Brazil	12.77w	
3rd place, bronze medalist(s)	Conceição Geremias	Brazil	12.71	
4	Gilda Massa	Peru	12.23w	
5	Graciela Acosta	Uruguay	12.22w	
6	Karla Salazar	Peru	12.08w	

=== Shot put ===
4 July

Rank	Name	Nationality	Result	Notes
1st place, gold medalist(s)	Elisângela Adriano	Brazil	16.47	CR
2nd place, silver medalist(s)	María Isabel Urrutia	Colombia	15.09	
3rd place, bronze medalist(s)	Carmen Chalá	Ecuador	14.83	
4	Rosa Peña	Peru	14.52	
5	Elvira Padilla	Peru	12.36	
6	Liliana Martinelli	Argentina	11.80	
7	Claudia Larenas	Chile	10.35	

=== Discus throw ===
3 July

Rank	Name	Nationality	Result	Notes
1st place, gold medalist(s)	María Isabel Urrutia	Colombia	55.14	CR
2nd place, silver medalist(s)	Elisângela Adriano	Brazil	53.16	
3rd place, bronze medalist(s)	Liliana Martinelli	Argentina	52.80	
4	Carmen Chalá	Ecuador	45.38	
5	Claudia Larenas	Chile	42.38	
6	Elvira Padilla	Peru	35.66	
7	Katia Méndez	Bolivia	33.66	

=== Javelin throw ===
2 July

Rank	Name	Nationality	Result	Notes
1st place, gold medalist(s)	Carla Bispo	Brazil	49.20	
2nd place, silver medalist(s)	Zorobabelia Córdoba	Colombia	48.74	
3rd place, bronze medalist(s)	Isabel Ordóñez	Ecuador	42.66	
4	Clara Vargas	Chile	41.02	
5	Hanny Buzarco	Peru	38.56	
6	Patricia Casariego	Peru	36.02	
7	Carmen Chalá	Ecuador	25.52	

=== Heptathlon ===
3–4 July

The highest mark recorded in each event is highlighted in yellow

Rank	Athlete	Nationality	100m H	HJ	SP	200m	LJ	JT	800m	Points	Notes
1st place, gold medalist(s)	Zorobabelia Córdoba	Colombia	14.7	1.62	12.43	25.4	5.89	45.76	2:30.4	5410	
2nd place, silver medalist(s)	Conceição Geremias	Brazil	14.8	1.68	12.78	26.8	5.89	33.14	2:32.2	5105	
3rd place, bronze medalist(s)	Elizabeth Arteaga	Bolivia	16.6	1.41	9.93	26.2	5.20	30.46	2:24.7	4282	
4	Rocío Martínez	Ecuador	15.9	1.47	10.71	28.0	4.45	28.18	2:48.0	3816	
5	Ana Bances	Peru	17.2	1.53	9.93	29.2	4.80	26.80	2:51.5	3620	
6	Isabel Ordóñez	Ecuador	18.8	1.44	10.28	29.3	4.29	21.74	2:54.1	3201	
