= Marcelo Pugliese =

Argentine discus thrower (born 1968)

Personal information
- Born: 2 September 1968 (age 57) Buenos Aires, Argentina

Sport
- Sport: Track and field
Medal record
Athletics
Representing Argentina
South American Games
Gold medal – first place	1998 Cuenca	Discus throw
Silver medal – second place	1990 Lima	Hammer throw
Bronze medal – third place	1990 Lima	Shot put
Bronze medal – third place	1990 Lima	Discus throw
Bronze medal – third place	1994 Valencia	Discus throw
Bronze medal – third place	1998 Cuenca	Shot put

Marcelo Adrián Pugliese (born 2 September 1968) is an Argentine discus thrower. His personal best throw is 64.23 metres, achieved in April 2002 in Mar del Plata.

He became South American champion in 1999, 2001 and 2003. He also competed at the Olympic Games in 1996, 2000 and 2004 as well as the World Championships in 1997 and 2001 without qualifying for the final round.

In March 2007 Pugliese was found guilty of stanozolol doping. The sample was delivered on 27 May 2006 in an in-competition test. He received a suspension from July 2006 to July 2008.

== International competitions ==
Year	Competition	Venue	Position	Event	Notes
Representing Argentina
1987	South American Junior Championships	Santiago, Chile	2nd	Discus	44.12 m
1987	South American Junior Championships	Santiago, Chile	2nd	Hammer	59.66 m
1988	Ibero-American Championships	Mexico City, Mexico	7th	Discus	48.36 m
1989	South American Championships	Medellín, Colombia	5th	Discus	48.46 m
1989	South American Championships	Medellín, Colombia	2nd	Hammer	67.00 m
1990	Ibero-American Championships	Manaus, Brazil	5th	Hammer	62.16 m
1990	South American Games	Lima, Peru	3rd	Shot put	14.76 m
1990	South American Games	Lima, Peru	3rd	Discus	46.70 m
1990	South American Games	Lima, Peru	2nd	Hammer	58.74 m
1991	South American Championships	Manaus, Brazil	6th	Shot put	14.48 m
1991	South American Championships	Manaus, Brazil	2nd	Discus	53.08 m
1991	Pan American Games	Havana, Cuba	7th	Discus	47.46 m
1991	Pan American Games	Havana, Cuba	6th	Hammer	68.02 m
1992	Ibero-American Championships	Seville, Spain	10th	Discus	49.08 m
1993	South American Championships	Lima, Peru	4th	Discus	51.02 m
1993	South American Championships	Lima, Peru	2nd	Hammer	67.36 m
1994	Ibero-American Championships	Mar del Plata, Argentina	3rd	Discus	59.18 m
1994	South American Games	Valencia, Venezuela	3rd	Discus	56.40 m
1995	Pan American Games	Mar del Plata, Argentina	5th	Discus	55.68 m
1995	South American Championships	Manaus, Brazil	7th	Shot put	15.94 m
1995	South American Championships	Manaus, Brazil	2nd	Discus	57.80 m
1996	Ibero-American Championships	Medellín, Colombia	3rd	Discus	54.32 m
1996	Olympic Games	Atlanta, United States	29th (q)	Discus	56.72 m
1997	South American Championships	Mar del Plata, Argentina	5th	Shot put	15.30 m
1997	South American Championships	Mar del Plata, Argentina	2nd	Discus	54.18 m
1997	World Championships	Athens, Greece	31st (q)	Discus	57.34 m
1998	Ibero-American Championships	Lisbon, Portugal	3rd	Discus	58.19 m
1998	South American Games	Cuenca, Ecuador	3rd	Shot put	15.46 m
1998	South American Games	Cuenca, Ecuador	1st	Discus	59.74 m
1999	South American Championships	Bogotá, Colombia	1st	Discus	59.23 m
1999	Pan American Games	Winnipeg, Canada	6th	Discus	56.34 m
2000	Ibero-American Championships	Rio de Janeiro, Brazil	2nd	Discus	58.14 m
2000	Olympic Games	Sydney, Australia	37th (q)	Discus	56.30 m
2001	South American Championships	Manaus, Brazil	1st	Discus	56.30 m
2001	World Championships	Edmonton, Canada	25th (q)	Discus	54.06 m
2002	Ibero-American Championships	Guatemala City, Guatemala	1st	Discus	59.00 m
2003	South American Championships	Barquisimeto, Venezuela	1st	Discus	57.44 m
2003	Pan American Games	Santo Domingo, Dominican Republic	8th	Discus	55.88 m
2004	Ibero-American Championships	Huelva, Spain	4th	Discus	59.05 m
2004	Olympic Games	Athens, Greece	31st (q)	Discus	56.06 m
2005	South American Championships	Cali, Colombia	2nd	Discus	56.76 m
2006	Ibero-American Championships	Ponce, Puerto Rico	2nd	Discus	53.46 m

== Personal bests ==
Outdoor

- Shot put – 16.50 (Rosario 1996)
- Discus throw – 64.23 (Mar del Plata 2002)
- Hammer throw – 68.90 (Buenos Aires 1995)

== See also ==
- List of sportspeople sanctioned for doping offences
