= Wenceslao Ferrín =

Colombian sprinter (born 1969)

Personal information
- Full name: Wenceslao Ferrín Jr.
- Born: 3 October 1969 (age 56)

Sport
- Sport: Athletics
- Event(s): 100 meters, 200 metres

Wenceslao Ferrín Jr. (born 3 October 1969) is a retired Colombian sprinter. He won multiple medals at regional level.

His father Wenceslao Ferrín Sr. was also a sprinter.

== International competitions ==
Year	Competition	Venue	Position	Event	Notes
Representing Colombia
1991	South American Championships	Manaus, Brazil	7th	100 m	10.73
1991	South American Championships	Manaus, Brazil	4th	4 × 400 m relay	3:13.72
1992	Ibero-American Championships	Seville, Spain	7th	100 m	10.86
1992	Ibero-American Championships	Seville, Spain	7th (h)	200 m	21.44
1992	Ibero-American Championships	Seville, Spain	5th	4 × 100 m relay	40.50
1992	Ibero-American Championships	Seville, Spain	7th	4 × 400 m relay	3:12.55
1993	Bolivarian Games	Cochabamba, Bolivia	1st	100 m	10.46
1993	Bolivarian Games	Cochabamba, Bolivia	1st	4 × 100 m relay	39.96
1993	South American Championships	Lima, Peru	9th (h)	100 m	11.17
1993	South American Championships	Lima, Peru	2nd	4 × 400 m relay	3:09.1
1993	Central American and Caribbean Games	Ponce, Puerto Rico	4th	100 m	10.67
1993	Central American and Caribbean Games	Ponce, Puerto Rico	3rd	4 × 100 m relay	40.09
1993	Central American and Caribbean Games	Ponce, Puerto Rico	5th	4 × 400 m relay	3:08.96
1994	Ibero-American Championships	Mar del Plata, Argentina	5th	200 m	20.88
1994	Ibero-American Championships	Mar del Plata, Argentina	3rd	4 × 100 m relay	40.79
1994	Ibero-American Championships	Mar del Plata, Argentina	3rd	4 × 400 m relay	3:08.24
1994	South American Games	Valencia, Venezuela	1st	400 m	45.84
1994	South American Games	Valencia, Venezuela	3rd	4 × 100 m relay	40.32
1995	Pan American Games	Mar del Plata, Argentina	7th	400 m	46.16
1995	South American Championships	Manaus, Brazil	5th	200 m	21.39
1995	South American Championships	Manaus, Brazil	3rd	400 m	46.33
1995	South American Championships	Manaus, Brazil	2nd	4 × 100 m relay	40.31
1995	South American Championships	Manaus, Brazil	2nd	4 × 400 m relay	3:10.16
1995	Pacific Ocean Games	Cali, Colombia	1st	4 × 100 m relay	39.81
1996	Ibero-American Championships	Medellín, Colombia	4th	400 m	46.81
1996	Ibero-American Championships	Medellín, Colombia	3rd	4 × 400 m relay	3:07.13
1997	South American Championships	Mar del Plata, Argentina	5th	400 m	47.71
1997	South American Championships	Mar del Plata, Argentina	4th	4 × 100 m relay	41.36
1997	South American Championships	Mar del Plata, Argentina	3rd	4 × 400 m relay	3:09.10
1997	Bolivarian Games	Arequipa, Peru	2nd	400 m	46.90
1997	Bolivarian Games	Arequipa, Peru	1st	4 × 400 m relay	3:05.57
2003	Military World Games	Catania, Italy	3rd (h)	400 m	49.97
2003	Military World Games	Catania, Italy	3rd	4 × 400 m relay	3:13.05

== Personal bests ==
Outdoor

- 100 meters – 10.46 (-0.3 m/s, Cochabamba 1993)
- 200 meters – 20.88 (+1.2 m/s, Mar del Plata 1994)
- 400 meters – 45.84 (Valencia 1994)
