= Verónica de Paoli =

Argentine hurdler

Verónica Depaoli
Personal information
- Nationality: Argentine
- Born: 7 May 1973 (age 53)

Sport
- Sport: Track and field
- Event: 100 metres hurdles

Verónica Depaoli (born 7 May 1973) is an Argentine hurdler. She competed in the women's 100 metres hurdles at the 2000 Summer Olympics.

== Competition record ==
Year	Competition	Venue	Position	Event	Notes
Representing Argentina
1992	World Junior Championships	Seoul, South Korea	18th (h)	100 m hurdles	14.06^{1}
1994	Ibero-American Championships	Mar del Plata, Argentina	2nd	100 m hurdles	13.90 (w)
1995	Pan American Games	Mar del Plata, Argentina	–	100 m hurdles	DNF
1995	Pan American Games	Mar del Plata, Argentina	5th	100 m hurdles	46.01
1995	South American Championships	Manaus, Brazil	6th	200 m	24.58
1995	South American Championships	Manaus, Brazil	2nd	100 m hurdles	13.92
1995	South American Championships	Manaus, Brazil	3rd	4 × 400 m relay	3:49.58
1997	South American Championships	Mar del Plata, Argentina	1st	100 m hurdles	13.41 (w)
1997	South American Championships	Mar del Plata, Argentina	1st	400 m hurdles	59.05
1997	South American Championships	Mar del Plata, Argentina	3rd	4 × 100 m relay	46.18
1997	South American Championships	Mar del Plata, Argentina	3rd	4 × 400 m relay	3:40.72
1997	World Championships	Athens, Greece	33rd (h)	100 m hurdles	13.83
1998	Ibero-American Championships	Lisbon, Portugal	2nd	100 m hurdles	13.46
1998	South American Games	Cuenca, Ecuador	1st	100 m hurdles	13.62
1999	South American Championships	Bogotá, Colombia	2nd	100 m hurdles	13.45
1999	South American Championships	Bogotá, Colombia	4th	400 m hurdles	59.93
1999	Pan American Games	Winnipeg, Canada	8th	100 m hurdles	13.28
1999	World Championships	Seville, Spain	37th (h)	100 m hurdles	13.58
2000	Ibero-American Championships	Rio de Janeiro, Brazil	8th (h)	100 m hurdles	14.32^{2}
2000	Olympic Games	Sydney, Australia	38th (h)	100 m hurdles	14.61

^{1}Did not finish in the semifinals

^{2}Did not start in the final
