= Yojer Medina =

Venezuelan athletics competitor

Personal information
- Full name: Yojer Enrique Medina
- Born: 5 September 1973 (age 52)
- Height: 1.85 m (6 ft 1 in)
- Weight: 105 kg (231 lb)

Sport
- Country: Venezuela
- Sport: Athletics
Medal record
Men's Athletics
Representing Venezuela
South American Games
Silver medal – second place	1994 Valencia	Shot put
Silver medal – second place	1994 Valencia	Discus throw
Bolivarian Games
Gold medal – first place	1993 Cochabamba	Shot put
Gold medal – first place	1993 Cochabamba	Discus throw
Gold medal – first place	1997 Arequipa	Shot put
Gold medal – first place	1997 Arequipa	Discus throw
Gold medal – first place	2001 Ambato	Shot put
Gold medal – first place	2001 Ambato	Discus throw
Gold medal – first place	2005 Armenia	Shot put
Silver medal – second place	2009 Sucre	Shot put
CAC Junior Championships (U20)
Silver medal – second place	1990 Havana	Shot put
Bronze medal – third place	1990 Havana	Discus throw
CAC Junior Championships (U17)
Gold medal – first place	1988 Nassau	Shot put
Gold medal – first place	1988 Nassau	Discus throw
Silver medal – second place	1988 Nassau	Javelin throw
Pan American Junior Athletics Championships
Silver medal – second place	1991 Kingston	Discus throw
- Updated on 31 May 2013

Yojer Enrique Medina (also Yoger Enrique Medina; born 5 September 1973) is a Venezuelan shot putter and discus thrower.

== Career ==
=== Regional competitions ===
Medina has been highly successful on the regional level. He won gold medals at the Central American and Caribbean Championships in 1995, 1997, 2001 and 2003. At the Central American and Caribbean Games he won a bronze medal in 1993, gold medals in 1998 and 2002, and finished fourth in 2006. He also won bronze medals in the discus throw in 1993 and 2002. At the South American Championships he won a bronze medal in 1991, and silver medals in 1993, 1995, 2001, 2003 and 2005. He also won a bronze medal in the discus throw in 1993. He is also a multiple Venezuelan national champion.

=== Global competitions ===
In world-level competitions, Medina finished twelfth at the 1992 World Junior Championships and sixth at the 1998 IAAF World Cup. He also competed at the World Championships in 1995, 1997 and 2001 as well as the 1996 Olympic Games without reaching the final.

His personal best put is 20.01 metres, achieved in August 2000 in Maracaibo. In the discus throw, he has 57.42 metres, achieved in November 1994 in Valencia.

== Personal best ==
- Shot put: 20.01 m – Maracaibo, Venezuela, 26 August 2000
- Discus throw: 57.42 m – Valencia, Venezuela, 22 November 1994
- Hammer throw: 60.34 m – Barquisimeto, Venezuela, 4 April 2003

== Achievements ==
Year	Competition	Venue	Position	Event	Notes
Representing Venezuela
1988	Central American and Caribbean; Junior Championships (U-17)	Nassau, Bahamas	1st	Shot put	14.55 m
1988	Central American and Caribbean; Junior Championships (U-17)	Nassau, Bahamas	1st	Discus	43.08 m
1988	Central American and Caribbean; Junior Championships (U-17)	Nassau, Bahamas	2nd	Javelin	56.52 m
1989	South American Junior Championships	Montevideo, Uruguay	1st	Shot put	14.94 m
1989	South American Junior Championships	Montevideo, Uruguay	2nd	Discus	46.72 m
1989	Pan American Junior Championships	Santa Fe, Argentina	3rd	Shot put	15.12 m
1989	Pan American Junior Championships	Santa Fe, Argentina	5th	Discus	46.72 m
1990	Central American and Caribbean; Junior Championships (U-20)	Havana, Cuba	2nd	Shot put	15.07 m
1990	Central American and Caribbean; Junior Championships (U-20)	Havana, Cuba	3rd	Discus	46.94 m
1990	South American Junior Championships	Bogotá, Colombia	1st	Shot put	15.50 m A
1990	South American Junior Championships	Bogotá, Colombia	1st	Discus	47.28 m A
1991	South American Championships	Manaus, Brazil	3rd	Shot put	16.35 m
1991	South American Championships	Manaus, Brazil	4th	Discus	48.72 m
1991	Pan American Junior Championships	Kingston, Jamaica	4th	Shot put	15.87 m
1991	Pan American Junior Championships	Kingston, Jamaica	2nd	Discus	49.54 m
1992	Ibero-American Championships	Seville, Spain	10th	Shot put	14.78 m
1992	Ibero-American Championships	Seville, Spain	8th	Discus	50.40 m
1992	South American Junior Championships	Lima, Peru	1st	Shot put	16.77 m
1992	South American Junior Championships	Lima, Peru	1st	Discus	48.40 m
1992	South American Junior Championships	Lima, Peru	2nd	Javelin	63.18 m
1992	World Junior Championships	Seoul, South Korea	12th	Shot put	16.71 m
1992	World Junior Championships	Seoul, South Korea	15th (q)	Discus	48.94 m
1993	Bolivarian Games	Cochabamba, Bolivia	1st	Shot put	17.46 m A
1993	Bolivarian Games	Cochabamba, Bolivia	1st	Discus	53.64 m A
1993	South American Championships	Lima, Peru	2nd	Shot put	17.52 m
1993	South American Championships	Lima, Peru	3rd	Discus	52.90 m
1993	Central American and Caribbean Games	Ponce, Puerto Rico	3rd	Shot put	17.96 m
1993	Central American and Caribbean Games	Ponce, Puerto Rico	3rd	Discus	54.94 m
1994	Ibero-American Championships	Mar del Plata, Argentina	5th	Shot put	17.24 m
1994	South American Games	Valencia, Venezuela	2nd	Shot put	18.06 m
1994	South American Games	Valencia, Venezuela	2nd	Discus	57.44 m
1995	Pan American Games	Mar del Plata, Argentina	4th	Shot put	18.42 m
1995	South American Championships	Manaus, Brazil	2nd	Shot put	18.82 m
1995	South American Championships	Manaus, Brazil	4th	Discus	52.12 m
1995	World Championships	Gothenburg, Sweden	10th (q)	Shot put	18.58 m
1996	Ibero-American Championships	Medellín, Colombia	2nd	Shot put	18.10 m
1996	Olympic Games	Atlanta, United States	23rd (q)	Shot put	18.53 m
1997	World Championships	Athens, Greece	12th (q)	Shot put	18.92 m
1997	Bolivarian Games	Arequipa, Peru	1st	Shot put	19.40 m A
1997	Bolivarian Games	Arequipa, Peru	1st	Discus	56.72 m A
1998	Central American and Caribbean Games	Maracaibo, Venezuela	1st	Shot put	19.42 m
1998	World Cup	Johannesburg, South Africa	6th	Shot put	19.08 m A
1999	Pan American Games	Winnipeg, Canada	–	Shot put	NM
2000	Ibero-American Championships	Rio de Janeiro, Brazil	2nd	Shot put	18.89 m
2001	South American Championships	Manaus, Brazil	2nd	Shot put	18.49 m
2001	Central American and Caribbean Championships	Guatemala City, Guatemala	1st	Shot put	18.86 m A
2001	World Championships	Edmonton, Canada	29th (q)	Shot put	17.76 m
2001	Bolivarian Games	Ambato, Ecuador	1st	Shot put	19.44 m A
2001	Bolivarian Games	Ambato, Ecuador	1st	Discus	52.68 m A
2002	Ibero-American Championships	Guatemala City, Guatemala	2nd	Shot put	19.27 m A
2002	Ibero-American Championships	Guatemala City, Guatemala	4th	Discus	51.20 m A
2002	Central American and Caribbean Games	San Salvador, El Salvador	1st	Shot put	19.63 m
2002	Central American and Caribbean Games	San Salvador, El Salvador	3rd	Discus	51.98 m
2003	South American Championships	Barquisimeto, Venezuela	2nd	Shot put	19.29 m
2003	Central American and Caribbean Championships	St. George's, Grenada	1st	Shot put	19.17 m
2003	Pan American Games	Santo Domingo, Dominican Republic	6th	Shot put	19.19 m
2004	Ibero-American Championships	Huelva, Spain	4th	Shot put	17.90 m
2005	ALBA Games	Havana, Cuba	4th	Shot put	17.92 m
2005	South American Championships	Cali, Colombia	2nd	Shot put	18.32 m
2005	Bolivarian Games	Armenia, Colombia	1st	Shot put	18.74 m A
2005	Bolivarian Games	Armenia, Colombia	3rd (no medal)	Discus	50.76 m A
2006	Ibero-American Championships	Ponce, Puerto Rico	1st	Shot put	18.79 m
2006	Central American and Caribbean Games	Cartagena, Colombia	3rd	Shot put	17.94 m
2007	ALBA Games	Caracas, Venezuela	3rd	Shot put	18.36 m
2007	South American Championships	São Paulo, Brazil	3rd	Shot put	18.44 m
2007	Pan American Games	Rio de Janeiro, Brazil	10th	Shot put	18.10 m
2009	Central American and Caribbean Championships	Havana, Cuba	3rd	Shot put	17.05 m
2009	Bolivarian Games	Sucre, Bolivia	2nd	Shot put	17.56 m A
2010	Central American and Caribbean Games	Mayagüez, Puerto Rico	5th	Shot put	16.33 m
2012	Ibero-American Championships	Barquisimeto, Venezuela	9th	Shot put	16.84 m
