= Llimy Rivas =

Colombian hurdler (born 1968)

Personal information
- Full name: Llimy Rivas Carabalí
- Nationality: Colombian - Spaniard
- Born: June 8, 1968 (age 58) Santander De Quilichao Cauca

Sport
- Country: Colombia
- Sport: Men's Athletics

Achievements and titles
- Personal best: 50:14
Medal record
Men's Athletics
Representing Colombia
Pan American Games
Bronze medal – third place	1995 Mar del Plata	400 m hurdles
South American Games
Gold medal – first place	1994 Valencia	400 m hurdles
Bronze medal – third place	1994 Valencia	400 m
Bolivarian Games
Gold medal – first place	1993 Cochabamba	400 m hurdles
Gold medal – first place	1997 Arequipa	400 m hurdles
Gold medal – first place	1997 Arequipa	4x400 m relay

Llimy Rivas Carabalí (born June 8, 1968) is a retired male track and field athlete from Colombia, who competed in the hurdling events during his career.

== Career ==
He claimed the bronze medal in the men's 400 metres hurdles event at the 1995 Pan American Games in Mar del Plata, Argentina.

== International competitions ==
Year	Competition	Venue	Position	Event	Notes
Representing Colombia
1990	Central American and Caribbean Games	Mexico City, Mexico	3rd	400 m hurdles	52.87
1991	South American Championships	Manaus, Brazil	4th	400 m hurdles	51.49
1991	South American Championships	Manaus, Brazil	4th	4 × 400 m relay	3:13.72
1992	Ibero-American Championships	Seville, Spain	11th (h)	400 m hurdles	52.67
1992	Ibero-American Championships	Seville, Spain	7th	4 × 400 m relay	3:12.55
1993	Bolivarian Games	Cochabamba, Bolivia	1st	400 m hurdles	52.21
1993	Bolivarian Games	Cochabamba, Bolivia	1st	4 × 400 m relay	3:10.51
1993	South American Championships	Lima, Peru	3rd	400 m hurdles	50.7
1993	South American Championships	Lima, Peru	2nd	4 × 400 m relay	3:09.1
1993	Central American and Caribbean Championships	Cali, Colombia	3rd	4 × 400 m relay	3:06.39
1993	Central American and Caribbean Games	Ponce, Puerto Rico	6th	400 m hurdles	51.86
1993	Central American and Caribbean Games	Ponce, Puerto Rico	5th	4 × 400 m relay	3:08.96
1994	Ibero-American Championships	Mar del Plata, Argentina	4th	400 m hurdles	51.07
1994	Ibero-American Championships	Mar del Plata, Argentina	3rd	4 × 400 m relay	3:08.24
1994	South American Games	Valencia, Venezuela	3rd	400 m	47.12
1994	South American Games	Valencia, Venezuela	1st	400 m hurdles	51.14
1994	South American Games	Valencia, Venezuela	2nd	4 × 400 m relay	3:07.84
1995	Pan American Games	Mar del Plata, Argentina	11th (h)	400 m	47.32
1995	Pan American Games	Mar del Plata, Argentina	3rd	400 m hurdles	50.37
1995	South American Championships	Manaus, Brazil	2nd	400 m hurdles	50.37
1995	South American Championships	Manaus, Brazil	2nd	4 × 400 m relay	3:10.16
1995	Central American and Caribbean Championships	Guatemala City, Guatemala	3rd	4 × 100 m relay	39.65
1995	Pacific Ocean Games	Cali, Colombia	2nd	400 m hurdles	51.22
1996	Ibero-American Championships	Medellín, Colombia	5th	400 m hurdles	50.58
1996	Ibero-American Championships	Medellín, Colombia	3rd	4 × 400 m relay	3:07.13
1997	South American Championships	Mar del Plata, Argentina	4th	400 m hurdles	51.29
1997	South American Championships	Mar del Plata, Argentina	3rd	4 × 400 m relay	3:09.10
1997	Bolivarian Games	Arequipa, Peru	2nd	400 m hurdles	50.14
1997	Bolivarian Games	Arequipa, Peru	1st	4 × 400 m relay	3:05.57
1998	Ibero-American Championships	Lisbon, Portugal	7th (h)	400 m hurdles	50.72
1998	Ibero-American Championships	Lisbon, Portugal	4th	4 × 400 m relay	3:10.01
1998	Central American and Caribbean Games	Maracaibo, Venezuela	8th	400 m hurdles	50.82
1998	Central American and Caribbean Games	Maracaibo, Venezuela	–	Decathlon	DNF
1999	South American Championships	Bogotá, Colombia	3rd	400 m hurdles	50.41
1999	South American Championships	Bogotá, Colombia	5th	4 × 100 m relay	40.22
1999	South American Championships	Bogotá, Colombia	2nd	4 × 400 m relay	3:04.52
