= Athletics at the 1994 South American Games =

Athletics at the V South American Games
- Dates: November
- Host city: Valencia, Venezuela
- Venue: Polideportivo Misael Delgado
- Level: Senior
- Events: 43 (24 men, 19 women)
- Records set: (about) 26 games records

Athletics events at the 1994 South American Games were held at the Polideportivo Misael Delgado in Valencia, Venezuela. A total of 43 events were contested, 24 by men and 19 by women.

Following a controversy between Sabino Hernández, president of the Comité Olímpico Ecuatoriano and Jacobo Bucaram, president of the Federación Ecuatoriana de Atletismo in the context of funding the number of athletes to travel to the games (22 versus 33 athletes), Ecuador did not participate in this year's athletics competitions.

On the other hand, athletics heavyweights Brazil (although only with a small delegation) and Colombia competed for the first time, leading to a noticeable improvement of the results as evident from the setting of (about) 26 games records.

== Medal summary ==
Medal winners were published in a book written by Argentinian journalist Ernesto Rodríguez III with support of the Argentine Olympic Committee (Spanish: Comité Olímpico Argentino) under the auspices of the Ministry of Education (Spanish: Ministerio de Educación de la Nación) in collaboration with the Office of Sports (Spanish: Secretaría de Deporte de la Nación). Eduardo Biscayart supplied the list of winners and their results. Further results were published elsewhere.

=== Men ===
Event	Gold		Silver		Bronze	
100 metres (wind: +0.4 m/s)	Robinson Urrutia; Colombia	10.29 GR, NR	Claudinei Silva; Brazil	10.42	Marcelo Brivilati da Silva; Brazil	10.43
200 metres (wind: +0.4 m/s)	Sebastián Keitel; Chile	20.1 GR	Claudinei Silva; Brazil	20.6	Jorge Cañizales; Venezuela	20.9
400 metres	Wenceslao Ferrín; Colombia	45.84 GR	Sebastián Keitel; Chile	46.01	Llimi Rivas; Colombia	47.12
800 metres	José Gregorio López; Venezuela	1:50.53	Pablo Squella; Chile	1:51.24	Manuel Balmaceda; Chile	1:51.57
1500 metres	José Gregorio López; Venezuela	3:47.56	Jacinto Navarrete; Colombia	3:48.67	Jaime Valenzuela; Chile	3:50.91
5000 metres	Jacinto Navarrete; Colombia	14:10.3	Germán Beltrán; Venezuela	14:19.7	Félix Ladera; Venezuela	14:25.6
10,000 metres	Rubén Maza; Venezuela	29:49.1	Mariano Mamaní; Bolivia	30:08.8	Félix Ladera; Venezuela	30:37.2
Marathon	Policarpo Calizaya; Bolivia	2:32:06	Gilberto Torres; Peru	2:32:58	Freddy Luján; Bolivia	2:38:50
110 metres hurdles	Eliécer Pulgar; Venezuela	14.33 GR	José Rivas; Colombia	14.42	Elvis Cedeño; Venezuela	14.46
400 metres hurdles	Llimi Rivas; Colombia	51.14	Luis Gómez; Venezuela	52.57	Juan Mago; Venezuela	53.68
3000 metres steeplechase	Jaime Valenzuela; Chile	9:04.2	Juan Díaz; Venezuela	9:06.4	Néstor Nieves; Venezuela	9:10.7
4 × 100 metres relay	Chile; Pablo Almeida; Sebastián Keitel; Carlos Moreno; Ricardo Roach	39.67 GR	Brazil; Fernando Botasso; Claudinei da Silva; Marcelo Brivilati da Silva; Nelson Ferreira	39.76	Colombia; Robinson Urrutia; Luis Vega; Wenceslao Ferrín; José Humberto Rivas	40.32
4 × 400 metres relay	Chile; Carlos Moreno; Pablo Squella; Ricardo Roach; Sebastián Keitel	3:06.92 GR	Colombia; Llimy Rivas; Luis Vega; Alcides Pinto; Gilmar Mayo	3:07.84	Venezuela; Vladimir Aponte; Claudio Silva; Medolphe; Henry Aguiar	3:15.74
20 kilometres race walk	José Querubín Moreno; Colombia	1:29:10.0 GR	Carlos Ramones; Venezuela	1:30:56	Luis Quispe; Bolivia	1:35:45
50 kilometres race walk	Luis Quispe; Bolivia	4:36.08	Rubén López; Venezuela	4:40:11	Luis García; Venezuela	4:43:52
High jump	Gilmar Mayo; Colombia	2.25 GR	Hugo Muñoz; Peru	2.14	Valery Abugattas; Peru	2.08
Pole vault	Oscar Veit; Argentina	5.10	Cristián Aspillaga; Chile	5.00	Luis Hidalgo; Venezuela	4.65
Long jump	Nelson Ferreira; Brazil	7.84 GR	Luis Lourduy; Colombia	7.47	Oscar Valiente; Peru	7.40
Triple jump	Sergio Saavedra; Venezuela	16.26	Oscar Valiente; Peru	15.60	Ascanio Winston; Venezuela	15.29
Shot put	Gert Weil; Chile	18.74 GR	Yoger Medina; Venezuela	18.06	Adrián Marzo; Argentina	16.88
Discus throw	Ramón Jiménez Gaona; Paraguay	57.88 GR	Yoger Medina; Venezuela	57.42	Marcelo Pugliese; Argentina	56.40
Hammer throw	Andrés Charadia; Argentina	70.80 GR	Adrián Marzo; Argentina	66.98	José Manuel Llano; Chile	59.96
Javelin throw	Nery Kennedy; Paraguay	76.70 GR	Rodrigo Zelaya; Chile	76.50	Edgar Baumann; Paraguay	70.78
Decathlon	Eladio Farfán; Venezuela	6678	Iván Romero; Venezuela	6297		

=== Women ===
Event	Gold		Silver		Bronze	
100 metres (wind: 0.0 m/s)	Felipa Palacios; Colombia	11.51	Katia Santos; Brazil	11.54	Mirtha Brock; Colombia	11.66
200 metres (wind: +0.5 m/s)	Felipa Palacios; Colombia	23.6	Patricia Rodríguez; Colombia	23.7	Katia Santos; Brazil	23.9
400 metres	Ximena Restrepo; Colombia	51.31 GR	Elia Mera; Colombia	54.08	Luciana Mendes; Brazil	54.72
800 metres	Luciana Mendes; Brazil	2:01.99 GR	Letitia Vriesde; Suriname	2:03.80	Marta Orellana; Argentina	2:06.37
1500 metres	Marta Orellana; Argentina	4:22.33 GR	Letitia Vriesde; Suriname	4:24.50	Clara Morales; Colombia	4:26.54
3000 metres	Erika Olivera; Chile	9:31.06 GR	Estela Castro; Colombia	9:49.1	María Flores; Chile	9:49.7
10,000 metres	Erika Olivera; Chile	34:40.9 GR	Estela Castro; Colombia	35:07.6	María Flores; Chile	35:29.6
100 metres hurdles (wind: -0.8 m/s)	Alejandra Martínez; Chile	14.42	Zorobabelia Córdoba; Colombia	14.63	Lisette Rondón; Chile	14.74
400 metres hurdles	Ximena Restrepo; Colombia	56.05 GR, NR	Flor Robledo; Colombia	60.20	Paula Yáñez; Venezuela	62.05
4 × 100 metres relay	Colombia; Patricia Rodríguez; Mirtha Brock; Felipa Palacios; Ximena Restrepo	44.98 GR	Chile; Alejandra Martínez; Marcela Barros; Lisette Rondón; Judith de la Fuente	46.97		
4 × 400 metres relay	Colombia; Elia Mera; Patricia Rodríguez; Janeth Lucumí; Flor Robledo	3:40.33 GR	Chile; Marcela Barros; Clara Morales; Lisette Rondón; Ismenia Guzman	3:47.37	Venezuela; Xiomara Díaz; Dilza Buaiz; Suarez; Shamira Valero	3:52.27
10 kilometres race walk	Liliana Bermeo; Colombia	48:54.9	Geovana Irusta; Bolivia	53:23.0	Carolin Rosales; Venezuela	55:41.4
High jump	Alejandra Chomalí; Chile	1.73	Teresa Rodríguez; Venezuela	1.70	Rubia Quintanilla; Venezuela	1.65
Long jump	Andrea Ávila; Argentina	6.51 GR	Mónica Castro; Chile	6.12	Nathaniel Gómez; Venezuela	6.01
Triple jump	Andrea Ávila; Argentina	13.12 GR	Nathaniel Gómez; Venezuela	12.48	Milly Figueroa; Colombia	12.37
Shot put	Lila Morales; Venezuela	13.02	Tyolanda Orozco; Venezuela	12.07		
Discus throw	María Isabel Urrutia; Colombia	58.08 GR	Liliana Martinelli; Argentina	56.74	Fanny García; Venezuela	48.54
Javelin throw	Zuleima Aramendiz; Colombia	55.46 GR	Marieta Riera; Venezuela	50.64	Verónica Prieto; Colombia	49.76
Heptathlon	Zorobabelia Córdoba; Colombia	5448 GR	Rubia Quintanilla; Venezuela	4915 NR	Mónica Castro; Chile	4508

== Medal table (unofficial) ==
* Host nation (Venezuela)

Rank	Nation	Gold	Silver	Bronze	Total
1	Colombia	16	10	6	32
2	Chile	9	7	7	23
3	Venezuela*	7	13	16	36
4	Argentina	5	2	3	10
5	Brazil	2	4	3	9
6	Bolivia	2	2	2	6
7	Paraguay	2	0	1	3
8	Peru	0	3	2	5
9	Suriname	0	2	0	2
Totals (9 entries)		43	43	40	126
