= Zuleima Araméndiz =

Colombian javelin thrower

Personal information
- Full name: Zuleima Araméndiz Mejía
- Born: 23 September 1975 (age 51) Valledupar, Cesar, Colombia
- Height: 1.72 m (5 ft 8 in)
- Weight: 85 kg (187 lb)

Sport
- Country: Colombia
- Sport: Athletics
Medal record
Women's athletics
Representing Colombia
South American Games
Gold medal – first place	1994 Valencia	Javelin throw
Bolivarian Games
Gold medal – first place	1997 Arequipa	Javelin throw
Gold medal – first place	2005 Armenia	Javelin throw
Gold medal – first place	2009 Sucre	Javelin throw
Silver medal – second place	2001 Ambato	Javelin throw
South American Youth Championships
Gold medal – first place	1990 Lima	Javelin throw
- Updated on 17 June 2013

Zuleima Araméndiz Mejía (born 23 September 1975) is a Colombian javelin thrower. Her personal best throw is 59.94 metres.

== Personal bests ==
- Javelin throw: 59.94 m A – Bogotá, Colombia, 12 June 2004
- Javelin throw (old model): 61.72 m A – Medellín, Colombia, 4 May 1996

== Achievements ==
Year	Competition	Venue	Position	Event	Notes
Representing Colombia
1990	South American Junior Championships	Bogotá, Colombia	4th	Javelin	40.82 m
1990	South American Youth Championships	Lima, Peru	1st	Javelin	41.22 m
1991	South American Junior Championships	Asunción, Paraguay	2nd	Javelin	42.50 m
1992	World Junior Championships	Seoul, South Korea	16th (q)	Javelin	49.76 m
1992	South American Junior Championships	Lima, Peru	1st	Javelin	50.92 m
1993	South American Junior Championships	Puerto la Cruz, Venezuela	3rd	Javelin	46.46 m
1994	World Junior Championships	Lisbon, Portugal	23rd (q)	Javelin	46.24 m
1994	South American Games	Valencia, Venezuela	1st	Javelin	55.46 m
1995	South American Championships	Manaus, Brazil	1st	Javelin	54.82 m
1996	Ibero-American Championships	Medellín, Colombia	3rd	Javelin	56.24 m
1996	Olympic Games	Atlanta, United States	28th (q)	Javelin	54.24 m
1997	South American Championships	Mar del Plata, Argentina	1st	Javelin	56.66 m
1997	World Championships	Athens, Greece	15th (q)	Javelin	58.98 m
1997	Bolivarian Games	Arequipa, Peru	1st	Javelin	58.04 m A GR
1998	Ibero-American Championships	Lisbon, Portugal	2nd	Javelin	57.57 m
1998	Central American and Caribbean Games	Maracaibo, Venezuela	–	Javelin	NM
1999	South American Championships	Bogotá, Colombia	3rd	Javelin	55.77 m A
2001	World Championships	Edmonton, Canada	20th (q)	Javelin	52.23 m
2001	Bolivarian Games	Ambato, Ecuador	2nd	Javelin	55.56m A
2002	Central American and Caribbean Games	San Salvador, El Salvador	1st	Javelin	56.63 m
2003	Pan American Games	Santo Domingo, Dominican Republic	7th	Javelin	50.37 m
2003	Universiade	Daegu, South Korea	16th	Javelin	51.21 m
2004	Ibero-American Championships	Huelva, Spain	3rd	Javelin	56.47 m
2004	Olympic Games	Athens, Greece	17th (q)	Javelin	59.94 m
2005	South American Championships	Cali, Colombia	2nd	Javelin	54.81 m
2005	Bolivarian Games	Armenia, Colombia	1st	Javelin	54.78 m A
2006	Central American and Caribbean Games	Cartagena, Colombia	5th	Javelin	56.03 m
2006	South American Championships	Tunja, Colombia	2nd	Javelin	55.60 m
2007	ALBA Games	Caracas, Venezuela	3rd	Javelin	55.69 m
2007	South American Championships	São Paulo, Brazil	2nd	Javelin	57.55 m
2007	Pan American Games	Rio de Janeiro, Brazil	9th	Javelin	47.95 m
2008	Ibero-American Championships	Iquique, Chile	3rd	Javelin	53.11 m
2008	Central American and Caribbean Championships	Cali, Colombia	6th	Javelin	51.75 m
2008	Olympic Games	Beijing, China	39th (q)	Javelin	54.71 m
2009	Bolivarian Games	Sucre, Bolivia	1st	Javelin	51.81 m A
