= Dolores Tuimoloau =

American Samoan athlete (1976–2011)

Dolores Tuimoloau (born May 29, 1976 – February 19, 2011) was an American Samoan athlete, primarily known for throwing events. She represented American Samoa at the 1995 Pacific Ocean Games, earning a silver medal in the shot put, the only such medal for her country.

Tuimoloau grew up in Oxnard, California. Since the age of 9, she excelled in basketball because she was always the largest in her class, a trend that brought her to the height of 1.86 m (6 ft 1 in) 310 pounds by the age of 18. She eventually played for Channel Islands High School where she was All-County in basketball. Looking for a sport to play in the springtime, she thought she would play softball but a friend invited her to try out for the track team. The first time she threw a shot put, it went 11.89 m (39 ft 0 in). She continued to improve, by her senior year she set the Ventura County record in both the shot put at 14.99 m (49 ft 2 in) and the discus at 44.20 m (145 ft 0 in). She won the 1994 CIF California State Meet in the shot put, beating her nearest competitor by almost two feet. A week later, she won the Golden West Invitational. She was touted as a potential Olympian while she attended Ventura College, but became academically ineligible while taking care of her father who suffered a massive heart attack at age 40. Returning to school, she set the still standing school records in both shot put and discus in 1996. She continued her education in Criminal Justice at California State University, Los Angeles. She eventually settled in Eureka, California.
