= Messias José Baptista =

Brazilian triple jumper

Personal information
- Born: 24 May 1968 São Paulo, Brazil
- Died: 11 September 2005 (aged 37) São Paulo, Brazil

Sport
- Sport: Athletics
- Event: Triple jump

Messias José Baptista (24 May 1968 – 11 September 2005) was a Brazilian athlete. He competed in the men's triple jump at the 1996 Summer Olympics. He died from complications of leukemia aged 37.

== International competitions ==
Year	Competition	Venue	Position	Event	Notes
Representing Brazil
1995	South American Championships	Manaus, Brazil	1st	Triple jump	16.29 m
1996	Ibero-American Championships	Medellín, Colombia	1st	Triple jump	16.99 m
1996	Olympic Games	Atlanta, United States	22nd (q)	Triple jump	16.45 m
2001	South American Championships	Manaus, Brazil	2nd	Triple jump	16.23 m
