= Patricia Rodríguez (athlete) =

Colombian sprinter (born 1970)

Personal information
- Nationality: Colombian
- Born: 25 October 1970 (age 55)

Sport
- Sport: Athletics
- Event: Sprints

Achievements and titles
- Olympic finals: 1996 (27th 200m, 19th 4x100m)
- World finals: 1995 (30th 200m, 7th 4x100m, DNF 4x400m), 1997 (33rd 200m, 11th 4x100m)
- Personal best: 100m - 11.51, 200m - 23.13, 400m - 51.89
Medal record
Representing Colombia
Pan American Games
Bronze medal – third place	1995 Mar del Plata	4x100m relay
Bronze medal – third place	1995 Mar del Plata	4x400m relay
Central American and Caribbean Games
Silver medal – second place	1993 Ponce	4x100m relay
Silver medal – second place	1993 Ponce	4x400m relay
Silver medal – second place	1998 Maracaibo	4x100m relay
- Updated on 25 September 2016

Patricia Libia Rodríguez Orejuela (born 25 October 1970) is a retired Colombian athlete who specialised in the sprinting events. She represented her country at the 1996 Summer Olympics, as well as the 1995 and 1997 World Championships. In addition, she won multiple medals on regional level.

== Competition record ==
Year	Competition	Venue	Position	Event	Notes
Representing Colombia
1993	South American Championships	Lima, Peru	2nd	100 m	12.10
1993	South American Championships	Lima, Peru	1st	200 m	24.2
1993	Central American and Caribbean Games	Ponce, Puerto Rico	6th	100 m	12.11
1993	Central American and Caribbean Games	Ponce, Puerto Rico	8th	200 m	24.39
1993	Central American and Caribbean Games	Ponce, Puerto Rico	2nd	4 × 100 m	44.62
1993	Central American and Caribbean Games	Ponce, Puerto Rico	2nd	4 × 400 m	3:36.82
1994	Ibero-American Championships	Mar del Plata, Argentina	5th	100 m	12.03
1994	Ibero-American Championships	Mar del Plata, Argentina	4th	200 m	23.82 w
1994	Ibero-American Championships	Mar del Plata, Argentina	1st	4 × 100 m	44.87
1994	Ibero-American Championships	Mar del Plata, Argentina	1st	4 × 400 m	3:35.35
1994	South American Games	Valencia, Venezuela	2nd	200 m	23.7
1994	South American Games	Valencia, Venezuela	1st	4 × 100 m	44.98
1994	South American Games	Valencia, Venezuela	1st	4 × 400 m	3:40.33
1995	Pan American Games	Mar del Plata, Argentina	5th	400 m	52.97
1995	Pan American Games	Mar del Plata, Argentina	3rd	4 × 100 m	44.10
1995	Pan American Games	Mar del Plata, Argentina	3rd	4 × 400 m	3:38.54
1995	South American Championships	Manaus, Brazil	3rd	200 m	23.42
1995	South American Championships	Manaus, Brazil	3rd	400 m	52.95
1995	South American Championships	Manaus, Brazil	1st	4 × 400 m	3:33.37
1995	World Championships	Gothenburg, Sweden	30th (h)	200 m	23.67
1995	World Championships	Gothenburg, Sweden	7th	4 × 100 m	44.61
1995	World Championships	Gothenburg, Sweden	–	4 × 400 m	DNF
1995	Universiade	Fukuoka, Japan	8th (sf)	100 m	11.63
1995	Universiade	Fukuoka, Japan	6th	200 m	23.41
1996	Ibero-American Championships	Medellín, Colombia	6th	200 m	24.27^{1}
1996	Ibero-American Championships	Medellín, Colombia	2nd	4 × 100 m	44.17
1996	Ibero-American Championships	Medellín, Colombia	1st	4 × 400 m	3:33.69
1996	Olympic Games	Atlanta, United States	27th (qf)	200 m	23.50
1996	Olympic Games	Atlanta, United States	19th (h)	4 × 100 m	44.16
1997	Central American and Caribbean Championships	San Juan, Puerto Rico	2nd	4 × 100 m	44.29
1997	World Championships	Athens, Greece	33rd (h)	200 m	23.45
1997	World Championships	Athens, Greece	11th (h)	4 × 100 m	43.51
1998	Ibero-American Championships	Lisbon, Portugal	5th	200 m	23.83
1998	Ibero-American Championships	Lisbon, Portugal	–	4 × 100 m	DNF
1998	Ibero-American Championships	Lisbon, Portugal	2nd	4 × 400 m	3:33.69
1998	Central American and Caribbean Games	Maracaibo, Venezuela	–	200 m	DNF
1998	Central American and Caribbean Games	Maracaibo, Venezuela	2nd	4 × 100 m	44.39
1999	South American Championships	Bogotá, Colombia	1st	4 × 100 m	44.12
1999	South American Championships	Bogotá, Colombia	1st	4 × 400 m	3:32.74
1999	Pan American Games	Winnipeg, Canada	11th (h)	200 m	24.33
1999	Pan American Games	Winnipeg, Canada	6th	4 × 400 m	3:32.87
2003	Pan American Games	Santo Domingo, Dom. Rep.	5th	4 × 100 m	45.13

^{1} Did not finish in the final

== Personal bests ==
Outdoor

- 100 metres – 11.51 (-1.1 m/s) (Medellín 1997)
- 200 metres – 23.13 (+0.1 m/s) (Atlanta 1996)
- 400 metres – 51.89 (Edwardsville 2003)

Indoor

- 200 metres – 25.57 (Chapel Hill 2002)
- 400 metres – 53.83 (Boston 2003)
