= Zandra Borrero =

Colombian sprinter

Personal information
- Full name: Zandra Patricia Borrero Díaz
- Nationality: Colombian
- Born: 17 July 1973 (age 52)

Sport
- Sport: Sprinting
- Event: 100 metres

Zandra Patricia Borrero Díaz (born 17 July 1973) is a Colombian sprinter. She competed in the women's 100 metres at the 1996 Summer Olympics.
