= Waldemar Cotelo =

Uruguayan long-distance runner (born 1964)

Personal information
- Nationality: Uruguayan
- Born: 12 March 1964 (age 62)
- Height: 1.73 m (5 ft 8 in)
- Weight: 60 kg (132 lb)

Sport
- Sport: Long-distance running
- Event: Marathon
Medal record
Representing Uruguay
South American Games
Gold medal – first place	1990 Lima	Marathon

Waldemar Cotelo (born 12 March 1964) is a Uruguayan long-distance runner. He competed in the men's marathon at the 1996 Summer Olympics.
