= Javier Verme =

Peruvian sprinter

Personal information
- Born: March 30, 1974 (age 52) Lima, Peru

Sport
- Sport: Track and field

Javier Verme Villarán (born March 30, 1974) is a former Peruvian sprinter who competed in the men's 100m competition at the 1996 Summer Olympics. He recorded a 10.91, not enough to qualify for the next round past the heats. His personal best is 10.54, set the same year at the Iberoamerican Championships in Medellin, Colombia.

He is still the Peruvian National record holder for 200m indoor, 21.98s set on March 7, 1997, at the World Indoor Championships, Paris, France.
