= Mirtha Brock =

Colombian sprinter (born 1970)

Personal information
- Full name: Mirtha Brock Forbes
- Born: 9 April 1970 (age 56) San Andrés, Colombia

Sport
- Country: Colombia
- Sport: Women's Athletics
- Events: 100m, 200m
Medal record
Women's athletics
Representing Colombia
Pan American Games
Bronze medal – third place	1995 Mar del Plata	4 x 100 m
Bronze medal – third place	1995 Mar del Plata	4 x 400 m
South American Games
Bronze medal – third place	1994 Valencia	100 m
Bolivarian Games
Gold medal – first place	1997 Arequipa	4x100 m relay
Gold medal – first place	2001 Ambato	100 m
Silver medal – second place	1993 Cochabamba	100 m
Silver medal – second place	1997 Arequipa	100 m
Bronze medal – third place	1997 Arequipa	200 m

Mirtha Brock Forbes (born 9 April 1970) is a Colombian retired track and field athlete, who competed in the sprint events during her career. She won two gold medals at the Bolivarian Games and twice represented Colombia at the Olympics.

== Early life ==
Brock was born on 9 April 1970 on San Andrés, Archipelago of San Andrés, Providencia and Santa Catalina, Colombia.

== Career ==
At the 1993 Bolivarian Games in Cochabamba, Bolivia, Brock won silver in the women's 100 m.

She followed that up with a silver in the women's 100 m and a gold in the women's 4 × 100 m relay at the 1994 Ibero-American Championships in Athletics in Mar del Plata, Argentina.

At the 1995 Pan American Games, also held in Mar del Plata, Brock helped Colombia to bronze in both the women's 4 × 100 metres relay and the women's 4 × 400 metres relay.

Brock made her Olympic debut at the 1996 Summer Olympics in Atlanta, United States where she contested both the women's 100 m and the women's 4 x 100 metres relay. She was eliminated in the heats of the women's 100 m after finishing seventh in her heat in a time of 11.83 seconds. Team Colombia narrowly missed out on a place in the final of the women's 4 x 100 metres relay after finished fourth in their heat in a time of 44.16 seconds.

She made her final Olympic appearance at the 2000 Summer Olympics in Sydney, Australia as part of the Colombian relay team for the women's 4 x 100 metres relay. Colombia progressed from the heats to the semi-finals but finished eighth in their semi-final in a time of 44.37 seconds and did not advance to the final.

== Achievements ==
Year	Competition	Venue	Position	Event	Notes
Representing Colombia
1993	Bolivarian Games	Cochabamba, Bolivia	2nd	100 m	12.03 A
1994	Ibero-American Championships	Mar del Plata, Argentina	2nd	100m	11.78 (wind: +1.6 m/s)
1994	Ibero-American Championships	Mar del Plata, Argentina	1st	4 × 100 m relay	44.87
1997	Bolivarian Games	Arequipa, Peru	2nd	100 m	11.50 w (2.6 m/s) A
1997	Bolivarian Games	Arequipa, Peru	3rd	200 m	23.86 w (3.1 m/s) A
1997	Bolivarian Games	Arequipa, Peru	1st	4 × 100 m relay	43.89 CR A
1998	Central American and Caribbean Games	Maracaibo, Venezuela	6th	100 m	11.73
1998	Central American and Caribbean Games	Maracaibo, Venezuela	2nd	4 × 100 m relay	44.39
2001	Bolivarian Games	Ambato, Ecuador	1st	100 m	11.82 (-2.0 m/s) A
2002	Central American and Caribbean Games	San Salvador, El Salvador	5th	400 m	55.02
2002	Central American and Caribbean Games	San Salvador, El Salvador	1st	4 × 100 m relay	45.34
