= List of Troféu Brasil de Atletismo winners =

The Troféu Brasil de Atletismo (Brazil Athletics Trophy) is an annual track and field meeting which serves as Brazil's national championships for athletics clubs. The Brazilian Athletics Confederation has not explicitly designated an annual national championships, thus this also serves as the de facto senior athletics championships.

== Men ==
=== 100 metres ===
- 1991: Robson da Silva
- 1992: Robson da Silva
- 1993: Robson da Silva
- 1994: Sidnei Telles de Souza
- 1995: Robson da Silva
- 1996: Arnaldo Silva
- 1997: André Domingos
- 1998: Claudinei da Silva
- 1999: Claudinei da Silva
- 2000: Vicente de Lima
- 2001: Claudinei da Silva & Raphael de Oliveira
- 2002: Vicente de Lima
- 2003: Édson Ribeiro
- 2004: Vicente de Lima
- 2005: Vicente de Lima

=== 200 metres ===
- 1991: Robson da Silva
- 1992: Robson da Silva
- 1993: Robson da Silva
- 1994: Robson da Silva
- 1995: Robson da Silva
- 1996: Claudinei da Silva
- 1997: André Domingos
- 1998: Claudinei da Silva
- 1999: Claudinei da Silva
- 2000: Claudinei da Silva
- 2001: André Domingos
- 2002: Vicente de Lima
- 2003: André Domingos
- 2004: André Domingos
- 2005: Vicente de Lima

=== 400 metres ===
- 1991: Roberto Bortolotto
- 1992: Inaldo Sena
- 1993: Eronilde de Araújo
- 1994: Inaldo Sena
- 1995: Inaldo Sena
- 1996: Sanderlei Parrela
- 1997: Sanderlei Parrela
- 1998: Valdinei da Silva
- 1999: Sanderlei Parrela
- 2000: Valdinei da Silva
- 2001: Flávio Godoy
- 2002: Flávio Godoy
- 2003: Anderson Jorge dos Santos
- 2004: Anderson Jorge dos Santos
- 2005: Sanderlei Parrela

=== 800 metres ===
- 1991: José Luíz Barbosa
- 1992: Ocky Clark (USA)
- 1993: José Luíz Barbosa
- 1994: José Luíz Barbosa
- 1995: José Luíz Barbosa
- 1996: Flávio Godoy
- 1997: José Luíz Barbosa
- 1998: Flávio Godoy
- 1999: Hudson de Souza
- 2000: Osmar dos Santos
- 2001: Valdinei da Silva
- 2002: Osmar dos Santos
- 2003: Osmar dos Santos
- 2004: Fabiano Peçanha
- 2005: Fabiano Peçanha

=== 1500 metres ===
- 1991: José Luíz Barbosa
- 1992: Edgar de Oliveira
- 1993: Edgar de Oliveira
- 1994: Edgar de Oliveira
- 1995: Joaquim Cruz
- 1996: Joaquim Cruz
- 1997: Hudson de Souza
- 1998: Hudson de Souza
- 1999: Hudson de Souza
- 2000: Hudson de Souza
- 2001: Hudson de Souza
- 2002: Hudson de Souza
- 2003: Fabiano Peçanha
- 2004: Hudson de Souza
- 2005: Fabiano Peçanha

=== 5000 metres ===
- 1991: Valdenor dos Santos
- 1992: Clodoaldo do Carmo
- 1993: Ronaldo da Costa
- 1994: Ronaldo da Costa
- 1995: Elenilson da Silva
- 1996: Adalberto García
- 1997: Valdenor dos Santos
- 1998: Valdenor dos Santos
- 1999: Elenilson da Silva
- 2000: Valdenor dos Santos
- 2001: Elenilson da Silva
- 2002: Hudson de Souza
- 2003: Marílson Gomes dos Santos
- 2004: Hudson de Souza
- 2005: Hudson de Souza

=== 10,000 metres ===
- 1991: Valdenor dos Santos
- 1992: Valdenor dos Santos
- 1993: Valdenor dos Santos
- 1994: Valdenor dos Santos
- 1995: Valdenor dos Santos
- 1996: Adalberto García
- 1997: Valdenor dos Santos
- 1998: Ronaldo da Costa
- 1999: Elenilson da Silva
- 2000: Valdenor dos Santos
- 2001: Elenilson da Silva
- 2002: Elenilson da Silva
- 2003: Marílson Gomes dos Santos
- 2004: Marílson Gomes dos Santos
- 2005: Franck de Almeida

=== 3000 metres steeplechase ===
- 1991: Wander Moura
- 1992: Clodoaldo do Carmo
- 1993: Wander Moura
- 1994: Wander Moura
- 1995: Eduardo do Nascimento
- 1996: Clodoaldo do Carmo
- 1997: Wander Moura
- 1998: Wander Moura
- 1999: Néstor Nieves (VEN)
- 2000: Wander Moura
- 2001: Celso Ficagna
- 2002: Celso Ficagna
- 2003: Fernando Fernandes
- 2004: Emigdio Delgado (VEN)
- 2005: Fernando Fernandes

=== 110 metres hurdles ===
- 1991: Joilto Bonfim
- 1992: Joilto Bonfim
- 1993: Joilto Bonfim
- 1994: Walmes de Souza
- 1995: Joilto Bonfim
- 1996: Emerson Perín
- 1997: Pedro Chiamulera
- 1998: Márcio de Souza
- 1999: Márcio de Souza
- 2000: Márcio de Souza
- 2001: Walmes de Souza
- 2002: Mateus Facho Inocêncio
- 2003: Redelén dos Santos
- 2004: Redelén dos Santos
- 2005: Mateus Facho Inocêncio

=== 400 metres hurdles ===
- 1991: Eronilde de Araújo
- 1992: Eronilde de Araújo
- 1993: Eronilde de Araújo
- 1994: Eronilde de Araújo
- 1995: Eronilde de Araújo
- 1996: Eronilde de Araújo
- 1997: Eronilde de Araújo
- 1998: Eronilde de Araújo
- 1999: Eronilde de Araújo
- 2000: Eronilde de Araújo
- 2001: Eronilde de Araújo
- 2002: Cleverson da Silva
- 2003: Eronilde de Araújo
- 2004: Raphael Fernandes
- 2005: Tiago Bueno

=== High jump ===
- 1991: Jorge Archanjo
- 1992: José Luís Mendes
- 1993: José Luís Mendes
- 1994: Alcides Silva
- 1995: Marcos dos Santos
- 1996: Wagner Príncipe
- 1997: Wagner Príncipe
- 1998: Wagner Príncipe
- 1999: Fabrício Romero
- 2000: Wagner Príncipe
- 2001: Fabrício Romero
- 2002: Fabrício Romero
- 2003: Jessé de Lima
- 2004: Jessé de Lima
- 2005: Fábio Baptista

=== Pole vault ===
- 1991: Marlon Borges
- 1992: Renato Bortolocci
- 1993: Pedro da Silva
- 1994: Marlon Borges
- 1995: Cristián Aspillaga (CHI)
- 1996: Pedro da Silva
- 1997: Oscar Veit (ARG)
- 1998: Gustavo Rehder
- 1999: Gustavo Rehder
- 2000: Gustavo Rehder
- 2001: Henrique Martins
- 2002: Henrique Martins
- 2003: Luke Walker (USA)
- 2004: Henrique Martins & João Gabriel Sousa
- 2005: Fábio da Silva

=== Long jump ===
- 1991: Paulo de Oliveira
- 1992: Márcio da Cruz
- 1993: Paulo de Oliveira
- 1994: Douglas de Souza
- 1995: Nélson Carlos Ferreira
- 1996: Douglas de Souza
- 1997: Cláudio Novães
- 1998: Douglas de Souza
- 1999: Sérgio dos Santos
- 2000: Nélson Carlos Ferreira
- 2001: Nélson Carlos Ferreira
- 2002: Jadel Gregório
- 2003: John Thornell (AUS)
- 2004: Jadel Gregório
- 2005: Erivaldo Vieira

=== Triple jump ===
- 1991: Anísio Silva
- 1992: Abcélvio Rodrigues
- 1993: Anísio Silva
- 1994: Anísio Silva
- 1995: Anísio Silva
- 1996: Anísio Silva
- 1997: Messias José Baptista
- 1998: Antônio da Costa
- 1999: Sérgio dos Santos
- 2000: Sérgio dos Santos
- 2001: Jadel Gregório
- 2002: Jadel Gregório
- 2003: Jadel Gregório
- 2004: Jadel Gregório
- 2005: Jadel Gregório

=== Shot put ===
- 1991: Adilson Oliveira
- 1992: Adilson Oliveira
- 1993: Adilson Oliveira
- 1994: Adilson Oliveira
- 1995: Adilson Oliveira
- 1996: Adilson Oliveira
- 1997: Édson Miguel
- 1998: Édson Miguel
- 1999: Édson Miguel
- 2000: Édson Miguel
- 2001: Adilson Oliveira
- 2002: Adilson Oliveira
- 2003: Daniel Freire
- 2004: Daniel Freire
- 2005: Daniel Freire

=== Discus throw ===
- 1991: João dos Santos
- 1992: João dos Santos
- 1993: João dos Santos
- 1994: João dos Santos
- 1995: João dos Santos
- 1996: João dos Santos
- 1997: Marcelo Pugliese (ARG)
- 1998: Andy Bloom (USA)
- 1999: João dos Santos
- 2000: João dos Santos
- 2001: Mateus Monari
- 2002: João dos Santos
- 2003: João dos Santos
- 2004: Gustavo de Mendonça
- 2005: Ronald Julião

=== Hammer throw ===
- 1991: Pedro Rivail Atílio
- 1992: Pedro Rivail Atílio
- 1993: Pedro Rivail Atílio
- 1994: Mário Leme
- 1995: Pedro Rivail Atílio
- 1996: Mário Leme
- 1997: Mário Leme
- 1998: Mário Leme
- 1999: Mário Leme
- 2000: Mário Leme
- 2001: Mário Leme
- 2002: Mário Leme
- 2003: Mário Leme
- 2004: Marcos dos Santos
- 2005: Wagner Domingos

=== Javelin throw ===
- 1991: Nivaldo Beje Filho
- 1992: Ivan Costa
- 1993: Luiz da Silva
- 1994: Luiz da Silva
- 1995: Luiz da Silva
- 1996: Luiz da Silva
- 1997: Luiz da Silva
- 1998: Luiz da Silva
- 1999: Luiz da Silva
- 2000: Luiz da Silva
- 2001: Luiz da Silva
- 2002: Luiz da Silva
- 2003: Luiz da Silva
- 2004: Júlio César de Oliveira
- 2005: Luiz da Silva

=== Decathlon ===
- 1991: Pedro da Silva
- 1992: José de Assis
- 1993: José de Assis
- 1994: José de Assis
- 1995: Pedro da Silva
- 1996: Pedro da Silva
- 1997: José de Assis
- 1998: Henk Dost (NED)
- 1999: Edson Bindilatti
- 2000: Edson Bindilatti
- 2001: Edson Bindilatti
- 2002: Edson Bindilatti
- 2003: Edson Bindilatti
- 2004: Edson Bindilatti
- 2005: Ivan da Silva

=== 20,000 metres walk ===
- 1991: Marcelo Palma
- 1992: Sérgio Galdino
- 1993: Sérgio Galdino
- 1994: Sérgio Galdino
- 1995: Cláudio Bertolino
- 1996: Sérgio Galdino
- 1997: Sérgio Galdino
- 1998: Sérgio Galdino
- 1999: Sérgio Galdino
- 2000: Sérgio Galdino
- 2001: Sérgio Galdino
- 2002: Sérgio Galdino
- 2003: Sérgio Galdino
- 2004: José Alessandro Bagio
- 2005: Sérgio Galdino

== Women ==
=== 100 metres ===
- 1991: Claudete Alves Pina
- 1992: Claudete Alves Pina
- 1993: Cleide Amaral
- 1994: Cleide Amaral
- 1995: Cleide Amaral
- 1996: Lucimar de Moura
- 1997: Lucimar de Moura
- 1998: Kátia Regina Santos
- 1999: Lucimar de Moura
- 2000: Lucimar de Moura
- 2001: Lucimar de Moura
- 2002: Kátia Regina Santos
- 2003: Lucimar de Moura
- 2004: Lucimar de Moura
- 2005: Lucimar de Moura

=== 200 metres ===
- 1991: Claudete Alves Pina
- 1992: Claudete Alves Pina
- 1993: Cleide Amaral
- 1994: Kátia Regina Santos
- 1995: Cleide Amaral
- 1996: Maria Magnólia Figueiredo
- 1997: Lucimar de Moura
- 1998: Kátia Regina Santos
- 1999: Lucimar de Moura
- 2000: Lucimar de Moura
- 2001: Lucimar de Moura
- 2002: Kátia Regina Santos
- 2003: Lucimar de Moura
- 2004: Rosemar Coelho Neto
- 2005: Lucimar de Moura

=== 400 metres ===
- 1991: Maria Magnólia Figueiredo
- 1992: Luciana Mendes
- 1993: Maria Magnólia Figueiredo
- 1994: Maria Magnólia Figueiredo
- 1995: Luciana Mendes
- 1996: Maria Magnólia Figueiredo
- 1997: Maria Magnólia Figueiredo
- 1998: Maria Magnólia Figueiredo
- 1999: Lorena de Oliveira
- 2000: Luciana Mendes
- 2001: Maria Laura Almirão
- 2002: Geisa Coutinho
- 2003: Geisa Coutinho
- 2004: Geisa Coutinho
- 2005: Lucimar Teodoro

=== 800 metres ===
- 1991: Maria Magnólia Figueiredo
- 1992: Maria Magnólia Figueiredo
- 1993: Maria Magnólia Figueiredo
- 1994: Fátima dos Santos
- 1995: Luciana Mendes
- 1996: Luciana Mendes
- 1997: Luciana Mendes
- 1998: Célia dos Santos
- 1999: Luciana Mendes
- 2000: Luciana Mendes
- 2001: Luciana Mendes
- 2002: Josiane Tito
- 2003: Luciana Mendes
- 2004: Luciana Mendes
- 2005: Christiane dos Santos

=== 1500 metres ===
- 1991: Rita de Jesus
- 1992: Maria Magnólia Figueiredo
- 1993: Soraya Telles
- 1994: Soraya Telles
- 1995: Célia dos Santos
- 1996: Célia dos Santos
- 1997: Fabiana Cristine da Silva
- 1998: Viviany de Oliveira
- 1999: Célia dos Santos
- 2000: Fabiana Cristine da Silva
- 2001: Fabiana Cristine da Silva
- 2002: Fabiana Cristine da Silva
- 2003: Juliana Paula dos Santos
- 2004: Juliana Paula dos Santos
- 2005: Juliana Paula dos Santos

=== 3000 metres ===
- 1991: Carmem de Oliveira
- 1992: Carmem de Oliveira
- 1993: Viviany de Oliveira

=== 5000 metres ===
- 1994: Silvana Pereira
- 1995: Roseli Machado
- 1996: Roseli Machado
- 1997: Fabiana Cristine da Silva
- 1998: Viviany de Oliveira
- 1999: Fabiana Cristine da Silva
- 2000: Fabiana Cristine da Silva
- 2001: Fabiana Cristine da Silva
- 2002: Fabiana Cristine da Silva
- 2003: Maria Rodrigues
- 2004: Fabiana Cristine da Silva
- 2005: Fabiana Cristine da Silva

=== 10,000 metres ===
- 1991: Carmem de Oliveira
- 1992: Carmem de Oliveira
- 1993: Carmem de Oliveira
- 1994: Silvana Pereira
- 1995: Roseli Machado
- 1996: Carmem de Oliveira
- 1997: Solange de Souza
- 1998: Márcia Narloch
- 1999: Nadir Sabino Siqueira
- 2000: Márcia Narloch
- 2001: Lucélia Peres
- 2002: Lucélia Peres
- 2003: Ednalva da Silva
- 2004: Maria Baldaia
- 2005: Lucélia Peres

=== 2000 metres steeplechase ===
- 1998: Magda Azevedo

=== 3000 metres steeplechase ===
- 1999: Soraya Telles
- 2000: Michelle Costa
- 2001: Maria Lúcia Vieira
- 2002: Marily dos Santos
- 2003: Michelle Costa
- 2004: Michelle Costa
- 2005: Michelle Costa

=== 100 metres hurdles ===
- 1991: Lucy Conceição
- 1992: Lucy Conceição
- 1993: Vânia da Silva
- 1994: Vânia dos Santos
- 1995: Donna Waller (USA)
- 1996: Vânia da Silva
- 1997: Maurren Maggi
- 1998: Maurren Maggi
- 1999: Maurren Maggi
- 2000: Maurren Maggi
- 2001: Maíla Machado
- 2002: Maíla Machado
- 2003: Gilvaneide Parrela
- 2004: Maíla Machado
- 2005: Maíla Machado

=== 400 metres hurdles ===
- 1991: Maria dos Santos
- 1992: Jupira da Graça
- 1993: Jupira da Graça
- 1994: Marise da Silva
- 1995: Maria dos Santos
- 1996: Maria dos Santos
- 1997: Ana Paula Pereira
- 1998: Jupira da Graça
- 1999: Ana Paula Pereira
- 2000: Ana Paula Pereira
- 2001: Isabel Silva
- 2002: Isabel Silva
- 2003: Lucimar Teodoro
- 2004: Lucimar Teodoro
- 2005: Lucimar Teodoro

=== High jump ===
- 1991: Orlane dos Santos
- 1992: Mônica Lunkmoss
- 1993: Orlane dos Santos
- 1994: Orlane dos Santos
- 1995: Orlane dos Santos
- 1996: Orlane dos Santos
- 1997: Luciane Dambacher
- 1998: Luciane Dambacher
- 1999: Solange Witteveen (ARG)
- 2000: Thaís de Andrade
- 2001: Luciane Dambacher
- 2002: Thaís de Andrade
- 2003: Luciane Dambacher
- 2004: Eliana da Silva
- 2005: Eliana da Silva

=== Pole vault ===
- 1995: Conceição Geremias
- 1996: Márcia Hennemann
- 1997: Miriam Schwuchow
- 1998: Patrícia Jiacomussi
- 1999: Joana Costa
- 2000: Karla Rosa da Silva
- 2001: Fabiana Murer
- 2002: Karla Rosa da Silva
- 2003: Karla Rosa da Silva
- 2004: Joana Costa
- 2005: Fabiana Murer

=== Long jump ===
- 1991: Rita Slompo
- 1992: Ljudmila Ninova (AUT)
- 1993: Maria de Souza
- 1994: Maria de Souza
- 1995: Cynthea Rhodes (USA)
- 1996: Luciana dos Santos
- 1997: Maria de Souza
- 1998: Maria de Souza
- 1999: Maurren Maggi
- 2000: Maurren Maggi
- 2001: Maurren Maggi
- 2002: Maurren Maggi
- 2003: Maurren Maggi
- 2004: Keila Costa
- 2005: Keila Costa

=== Triple jump ===
- 1991: Rita Slompo
- 1992: Rita Slompo
- 1993: Maria de Souza
- 1994: Maria de Souza
- 1995: Cynthea Rhodes (USA)
- 1996: Cida de Souza
- 1997: Maria de Souza
- 1998: Maria de Souza
- 1999: Luciana dos Santos
- 2000: Luciana dos Santos
- 2001: Luciana dos Santos
- 2002: Maurren Maggi
- 2003: Keila Costa
- 2004: Keila Costa
- 2005: Keila Costa

=== Shot put ===
- 1991: Elisângela Adriano
- 1992: Elisângela Adriano
- 1993: Elisângela Adriano
- 1994: Alexandra Amaro
- 1995: Elisângela Adriano
- 1996: Elisângela Adriano
- 1997: Elisângela Adriano
- 1998: Elisângela Adriano
- 1999: Elisângela Adriano
- 2000: Elisângela Adriano
- 2001: Elisângela Adriano
- 2002: Elisângela Adriano
- 2003: Elisângela Adriano
- 2004: Elisângela Adriano
- 2005: Andrea Pereira

=== Discus throw ===
- 1991: Rosana Piovesan
- 1992: Elisângela Adriano
- 1993: Elisângela Adriano
- 1994: Elisângela Adriano
- 1995: Amélia Moreira
- 1996: Elisângela Adriano
- 1997: Elisângela Adriano
- 1998: Elisângela Adriano
- 1999: Elisângela Adriano
- 2000: Elisângela Adriano
- 2001: Elisângela Adriano
- 2002: Elisângela Adriano
- 2003: Elisângela Adriano
- 2004: Elisângela Adriano
- 2005: Renata de Figueirêdo

=== Hammer throw ===
- 1994: Maria Pacheco
- 1995: Maria Pacheco
- 1996: Josiane Soares
- 1997: Karina Moya (ARG)
- 1998: Josiane Soares
- 1999: Josiane Soares
- 2000: Josiane Soares
- 2001: Karina Moya (ARG)
- 2002: Margit Wahlbrink
- 2003: Katiuscia de Jesus
- 2004: Katiuscia de Jesus
- 2005: Josiane Soares

=== Javelin throw ===
- 1991: Sueli dos Santos
- 1992: Päivi Alafrantti (FIN)
- 1993: Sueli dos Santos
- 1994: Sueli dos Santos
- 1995: Alessandra Resende
- 1996: Carla Bispo
- 1997: Carla Bispo
- 1998: Alessandra Resende
- 1999: Sueli dos Santos
- 2000: Sueli dos Santos
- 2001: Alessandra Resende
- 2002: Alessandra Resende
- 2003: Leryn Franco (PAR)
- 2004: Leryn Franco (PAR)
- 2005: Alessandra Resende

=== Heptathlon ===
- 1991: Orlane dos Santos
- 1992: Ana Lúcia Silva
- 1993: Conceição Geremias
- 1994: Joelma Souza
- 1995: Euzinete dos Reis
- 1996: Euzinete dos Reis
- 1997: Euzinete dos Reis
- 1998: Euzinete dos Reis
- 1999: Euzinete dos Reis
- 2000: Euzinete dos Reis
- 2001: Elizete da Silva
- 2002: Patrícia de Oliveira
- 2003: Elizete da Silva
- 2004: Merli Caldeira
- 2005: Lucimara da Silva

=== 10,000 metres walk ===
- 1991: Ivana Henn
- 1992: Ivana Henn
- 1993: Nailse Pazin
- 1994: Ivana Henn
- 1995: Nailse Pazin
- 1996: Gianetti Bonfim
- 1997: Gianetti Bonfim
- 1998: Gianetti Bonfim

=== 20,000 metres walk ===
- 1999: Gianetti Bonfim
- 2000: Gianetti Bonfim
- 2001: Gianetti Bonfim
- 2002: Gianetti Bonfim
- 2003: Cisiane Lopes
- 2004: Alessandra Picagevicz
- 2005: Alessandra Picagevicz
