= Niusha Mancilla =

Bolivian middle-distance runner (born 1971)

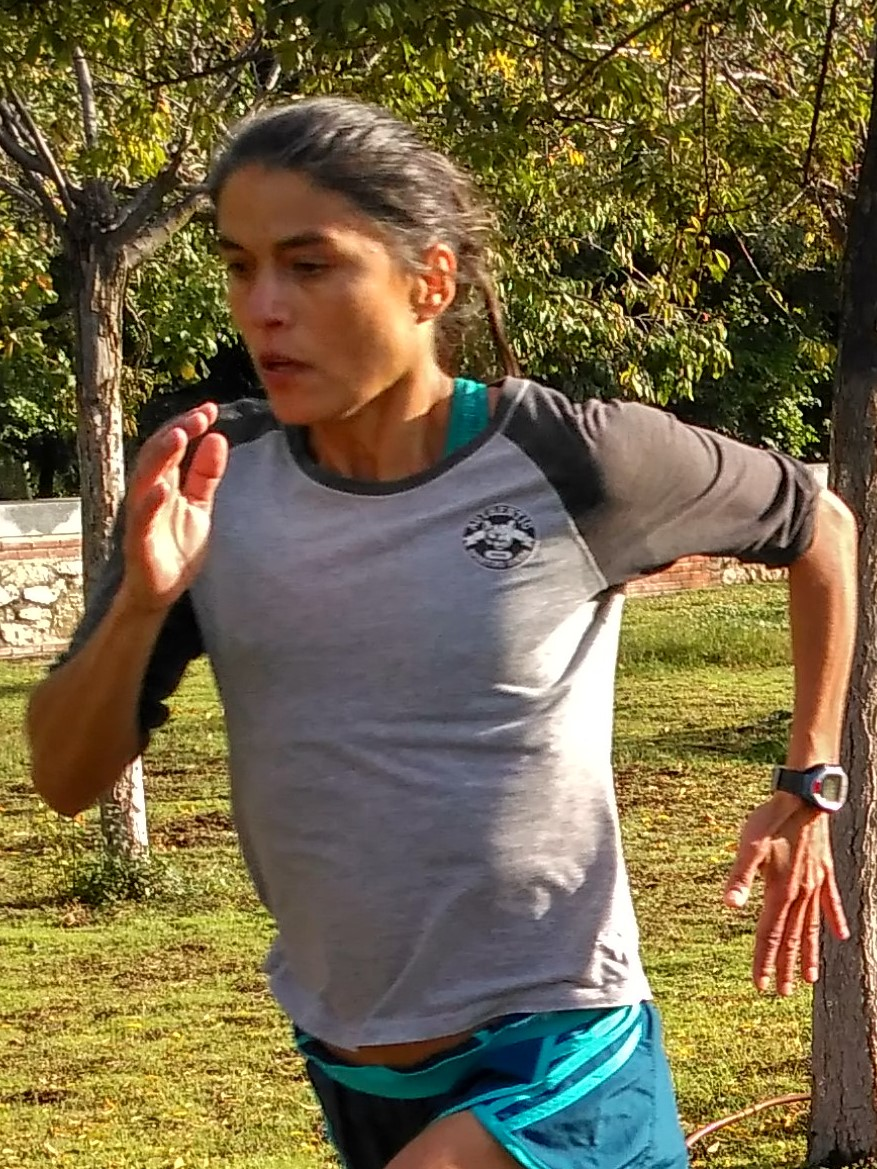
- Mancilla in 2016

Personal information
- Full name: Niusha Carmen Mancilla Heredia
- Born: 19 January 1971 (age 55) Cochabamba, Bolivia
- Height: 1.75 m (5 ft 9 in)
- Weight: 52 kg (115 lb)

Sport
- Country: Bolivia
- Sport: Women's Athletics
Medal record
Women's athletics
Representing Bolivia
South American Championships
Silver medal – second place	1997 Mar de Plata	1500 metres
Silver medal – second place	2003 Barquisimeto	1500 metres
South American Games
Silver medal – second place	1998 Cuenca	800 m
Silver medal – second place	1998 Cuenca	1500 m
Bronze medal – third place	1998 Cuenca	5000 m
Bronze medal – third place	1990 Lima	1500 m
Bolivarian Games
Gold medal – first place	2001 Ambato	800 m
Gold medal – first place	2001 Ambato	1500 m
Gold medal – first place	2001 Ambato	3000 m steeplechase
Bronze medal – third place	1997 Arequipa	1500 m
South American Youth Championships
Silver medal – second place	1986 Comodoro Rivadavia	800 m
Bronze medal – third place	1984 Tarija	800 m

Niusha Carmen Mancilla Heredia (born 19 January 1971) is a Bolivian former middle and long-distance runner. She holds the Bolivian records from 800 metres up to the 15 km road distance, as well as for the 3000 metres steeplechase.

She is a two-time South American silver medallist in the 1500 metres and competed three times at the IAAF World Indoor Championships over that distance. She won middle distance track medals at the Ibero-American Championships in Athletics at the 2000 and 2002 editions. At the 2001 Bolivarian Games she won three gold medals and set two national records. She also represented Bolivia at the 2000 IAAF World Cross Country Championships and the 2003 Pan American Games.

== Career ==
Mancilla began competing in middle distance events from a young age and was the 800 metres bronze medallist at the 1984 South American Youth Championships in Athletics. She made her global debut at the 1986 World Junior Championships in Athletics, competing in the 800 m and the 400 metres hurdles, in Athletics before going on to win the 800 m silver medal at the 1986 South American Youth Championships in Athletics. At later South American Junior Championships in Athletics, she came fourth in 1987 and 1988, then fifth at the 1989 meet.

Mancilla's senior debut came at the 1997 IAAF World Indoor Championships, where she ran in the heats of the 1500 metres. In the outdoor season she claimed her first major senior medal, a silver over 1500 m at the 1997 South American Championships in Athletics. She was also a bronze medallist at the 1997 Bolivarian Games. Her first 800 m medal came at the 1998 South American Games, where she was runner-up in a time of 2:07.85 minutes. She set a Bolivian record of 4:20.16 minutes in the indoor 1500 m heats at the 1999 IAAF World Indoor Championships. Her first medal in cross country running also came that year when she was runner-up to Chile's Erika Olivera in the short course race at the South American Cross Country Championships. This led to her competing at the 2000 IAAF World Cross Country Championships and she came 82nd overall.

Her run of 16:14.03 minutes in 2000 was a Bolivian record for the 5000 metres and she was the 1500 m bronze medallist at that year's Ibero-American Championships. Her best performances the following year all came at the 2001 Bolivarian Games, where she completed a triple gold medal sweep in the 800 m, 1500 m and the 3000 metres steeplechase. Her 800 m time of 2:03.98 minutes and steeplechase time of 10:40.7 minutes were both Bolivian records. Mancilla won multiple medals at the 2002 Ibero-American Championships in Athletics in Guatemala City, taking the 800 m bronze and 1500 m silver medals. She competed on the Spanish track circuit that summer and ran a 1500 m best of 4:17.91 minutes in San Sebastián and a 3000 metres national record of 9:16.03 minutes in Seville. Further to this, she ran a 15 km road record of 52:45 minutes in Bolivia in October.

She ran an indoor 3000 m record of 9:35.1 minutes the following February in Zaragoza. Later that year she had her best ever performance in the 1500 m and improved her national record by over a second with a run of 4:16.64 minutes in Seville. At the 2003 South American Championships in Athletics Mancilla won her second and final continental track medal with a runner-up performance in the 1500 m (she was also fourth over 800 m). She also took part in the 2003 Pan American Games, but did not finish in the 1500 m final. In her third global appearance she competed at the 2004 IAAF World Indoor Championships, but did not finish her heat. She set an unofficial South American 2000 m best of 5:59.96 minutes at a competition in Rivas-Vaciamadrid and attended the 2006 Ibero-American Championships in Athletics in Huelva later that season, placing fourth in the 1500 m and sixth over 3000 m. She ran a Bolivian record in the 10K road race in November, running a time of 34:01 minutes in Madrid. She continued to compete in low level meetings in Spain from 2004 to 2008, but retired thereafter.

== Achievements ==
Year	Competition	Venue	Position	Event	Notes
Representing Bolivia
1984	South American Youth Championships	Tarija, Bolivia	3rd	800 m	2:24.8 min A
1986	World Junior Championships	Athens, Greece	38th (h)	800m	2:21.10
1986	World Junior Championships	Athens, Greece	21st (h)	400m hurdles	66.88
1986	South American Youth Championships	Comodoro Rivadavia, Argentina	7th	400 m	60.37
1986	South American Youth Championships	Comodoro Rivadavia, Argentina	2nd	800 m	2:19.18
1990	South American Games	Lima, Peru	3rd	1500 m	4:37.4
1991	South American Championships	Manaus, Brazil	10th	800 m	2:14.50
1991	South American Championships	Manaus, Brazil	6th	1500 m	4:38.86
1991	Pan American Games	Havana, Cuba	12th (h)	800 m	2:13.21
1991	Pan American Games	Havana, Cuba	12th	1500 m	4:44.90
1997	World Indoor Championships	Paris, France	17th (h)	1500 m	4:28.70
1997	South American Championships	Mar del Plata, Argentina	4th	800 m	2:10.28
1997	South American Championships	Mar del Plata, Argentina	2nd	1500 m	4:34.90
1997	Bolivarian Games	Arequipa, Peru	3rd	1500 m	4:33.3 A
1998	South American Games	Cuenca, Ecuador	2nd	800 m	2:07.85
1998	South American Games	Cuenca, Ecuador	2nd	1500 m	4:25.42
1998	South American Games	Cuenca, Ecuador	3rd	5000 m	17:17.9
1999	World Indoor Championships	Maebashi, Japan	14th (h)	1500 m	4:20.16
1999	Pan American Games	Winnipeg, Canada	12th (h)	800 m	2:09.91
1999	Pan American Games	Winnipeg, Canada	9th	1500 m	4:26.71
2000	Ibero-American Championships	Rio de Janeiro, Brazil	3rd	1500 m	4:20.02
2001	Bolivarian Games	Ambato, Ecuador	1st	800 m	2:03.98 A
2001	Bolivarian Games	Ambato, Ecuador	1st	1500 m	4:22.6 A
2001	Bolivarian Games	Ambato, Ecuador	1st	3000 m s'chase	10:40.7 A
2002	Ibero-American Championships	Guatemala City, Guatemala	3rd	800 m	2:08.53
2002	Ibero-American Championships	Guatemala City, Guatemala	2nd	1500 m	4:25.25
2003	South American Championships	Barquisimeto, Venezuela	4th	800 m	2:07.63
2003	South American Championships	Barquisimeto, Venezuela	2nd	1500 m	4:21.54
2003	Pan American Games	Santo Domingo, Dominican Republic	–	1500 m	DNF
2004	World Indoor Championships	Budapest, Hungary	–	1500 m	DNF
2004	Ibero-American Championships	Huelva, Spain	4th	1500 m	4:21.52
2004	Ibero-American Championships	Huelva, Spain	6th	3000 m	9.28.70
