= 1986 South American Youth Championships in Athletics =

VIII South American Youth Championships in Athletics
- Dates: October 17–19
- Host city: Comodoro Rivadavia, Argentina
- Level: Youth
- Events: 34
- Participation: about 205 athletes from 9 nations

The eighth South American Youth Championships in Athletics were held in Comodoro Rivadavia, Argentina, from October 17–19, 1986. Approximately 205 athletes of nine nationalities took part in 34 races.

== Medal summary ==
Medal winners are published for boys and girls. Complete results can be found on the "World Junior Athletics History" website.

=== Men ===
Event	Gold		Silver		Bronze	
100 metres (wind: -1.2 m/s)	Néstor Soncini (ARG)	11.13	Adilson da Silva (BRA)	11.54	Fernando Botasso (BRA)	11.59
200 metres (wind: +1.5 m/s)	Néstor Soncini (ARG)	22.2	Adilson da Silva (BRA)	23.2	Roberto Provis (CHI)	23.6
400 metres	Inaldo Sena (BRA)	50.63	Antônio Enrique Ferreira (BRA)	51.44	Santiago Ramírez (URU)	51.62
800 metres	Ricardo Beltrán (ARG)	1:57.34	Luciano Rosa (BRA)	1:57.94	Ricardo Quesada (CHI)	1:59.02
1500 metres	Edgardo Graglia (ARG)	4:02.8	Marcelo Barrientos (CHI)	4:03.0	Ricardo Moreno (ARG)	4:04.7
3000 metres	Marcelo Barrientos (CHI)	8:50.43	Ricardo Moreno (ARG)	8:53.60	Heriberto Acevedo (BRA)	8:56.84
1500 metres steeplechase	Hermelindo Almiro (BRA)	4:28.8	Marcelo Barrientos (CHI)	4:30.0	Marcelo Pires (BRA)	4:34.0
110 metres hurdles (wind: +1.2 m/s)	Fábio Aleixo (BRA)	14.5	Sergio Kleng (ARG)	15.1	Fábio Tofani (BRA)	15.3
300 metres hurdles	Fábio Aleixo (BRA)	39.11	Gonzalo Loveday (PER)	39.81	Ricardo Bukalil (BRA)	40.12
High jump	Fernando Damonte (ARG)	1.92	Damián Gianotti (ARG)	1.88	José Rodríguez (VEN)	1.88
Pole vault	Diego Vázquez (ARG)	3.92	Igor Castillo (PER)	3.60	Carlos Pérez (ARG)	3.40
Long jump	Sérgio Santos (BRA)	6.73	Marcos Cooper (ARG)	6.57	Marcos de Moraes (BRA)	6.52
Triple jump	Marcos de Moraes (BRA)	13.94	Sanderlei da Conceição (BRA)	13.69	Elvio Justiniano (BOL)	13.35
Shot put	Raimundo Monasterio (VEN)	16.14	Acassio da Silva (BRA)	15.62	Ricardo Torres (PAR)	14.94
Discus throw	Márcio Barreto (BRA)	48.16	Marcelo Dadario (ARG)	48.08	Acassio da Silva (BRA)	46.16
Hammer throw	Julio César Anelli (ARG)	55.40	Leonardo Melano (ARG)	55.34	Alexandre Mantovani (BRA)	53.66
Javelin throw	Daniel Mijares (VEN)	52.16	Fábio Boso (BRA)	51.90	Marcos Balbuena (ARG)	50.02
Hexathlon	Marcelo Viola (ARG)	3890	Daniel Mijares (VEN)	3771	Fernando Oliva (ARG)	3723
4 × 100 metres relay	Brazil	43.75	Chile	44.07	Uruguay	44.20
4 × 400 metres relay	Argentina; Esteban Gambaro; Marcos Cooper; Fabian Gandolfi; Gustavo Fontenla	3:29.59	Brazil	3:31.54	Uruguay	3:34.86

=== Women ===
Event	Gold		Silver		Bronze	
100 metres (wind: -0.8 m/s)	Roseli Diogo (BRA)	12.82	Ana Maria Rocha (BRA)	12.87	Silvina Grion (ARG)	12.88
200 metres (wind: 0.0 m/s)	Jupira da Graça (BRA)	26.2	Roseli Diogo (BRA)	26.3	Claudia Riquelme (CHI)	26.6
400 metres	Jupira da Graça (BRA)	56.96	Claudia Riquelme (CHI)	57.01	Virginia Guerra (URU)	58.74
800 metres	Célia dos Santos (BRA)	2:17.25	Niusha Mansilla (BOL)	2:19.18	Roberta Baungarten (BRA)	2:19.70
1500 metres	Roxana Coronatti (ARG)	4:41.5	Noemí Sabino (BRA)	4:43.8	Roxana Palavecino (ARG)	4:44.9
100 metres hurdles (wind: 0.0 m/s)	Graciela Pugliese (ARG)	15.24	Susana Letts (PER)	15.42	Ana Maria Rocha (BRA)	15.43
High jump	Doroto Raimundo (BRA)	1.63	Graciela Pugliese (ARG)	1.60	Claudia Blotto (ARG)	1.60
Long jump	Ana Martina Vizioli (ARG)	5.70	Natalia Toledo (PAR)	5.46	María Isabel Rubio (CHI)	5.44
Shot put	Maria da Silva (BRA)	11.52	Stella Carpinelli (BRA)	11.12	Graciela Pugliese (ARG)	10.99
Discus throw	Rosemeire Silva (BRA)	37.74	Sadith Fretes (PAR)	37.14	Adriana Romero (ARG)	35.32
Javelin throw	Rosemeire Silva (BRA)	47.76	Natalia Toledo (PAR)	40.86	Jeanette Bensinger (PER)	39.76
Pentathlon	Ana Martina Vizioli (ARG)	3177	Carolina Sanz (CHI)	3083	Vera Alves (BRA)	2917
4 × 100 metres relay	Brazil	49.01	Chile	50.06	Uruguay	50.08
4 × 400 metres relay	Brazil	4:02.64	Argentina	4:04.20	Chile	4:06.21

== Medal table (unofficial) ==
* Host nation (Argentina)

Rank	Nation	Gold	Silver	Bronze	Total
1	Brazil (BRA)	18	12	11	41
2	Argentina (ARG)*	13	8	9	30
3	Venezuela (VEN)	2	1	1	4
4	Chile (CHI)	1	6	5	12
5	Paraguay (PAR)	0	3	1	4
5	Peru (PER)	0	3	1	4
7	Bolivia (BOL)	0	1	1	2
8	Uruguay (URU)	0	0	5	5
Totals (8 entries)		34	34	34	102

== Participation (unofficial) ==
Detailed result lists can be found on the "World Junior Athletics History" website. An unofficial count yields the number of about 205 athletes from about 9 countries:

- Argentina (48)
- Bolivia (5)
- Brazil (38)
- Chile (22)
- Ecuador (10)
- Paraguay (18)
- (Peru) Perú (39)
- Uruguay (14)
- Venezuela (11)
