= Adrián Marzo =

Argentine hammer thrower

Personal information
- Born: 24 January 1968 (age 57) Santa Fe, Argentina

Sport
- Sport: Track and field

Adrián Carlos Marzo (born 24 January 1968) is a retired Argentine athlete who specialised in the hammer throw. His personal best in the event is 70.12 metres, set in 2000.

His eleven consecutive appearances at the Ibero-American Championships (between 1988 and 2008) are the record for this competition. His father Carlos Marzo was also a hammer thrower, competing in the 1960s.

== Competition record ==
Year	Competition	Venue	Position	Event	Notes
Representing Argentina
1984	South American Youth Championships	Tarija, Bolivia	1st	Hammer throw (5 kg)	59.14 m
1986	Pan American Junior Championships	Winter Park, United States	3rd	Hammer throw	56.16 m
1986	World Junior Championships	Athens, Greece	20th (q)	Hammer throw	55.52 m
1986	South American Junior Championships	Quito, Ecuador	1st	Hammer throw	64.88 m
1987	South American Junior Championships	Santiago, Chile	1st	Hammer throw	60.88 m
1987	South American Championships	São Paulo, Brazil	3rd	Hammer throw	59.94 m
1988	Ibero-American Championships	Mexico City, Mexico	5th	Hammer throw	61.64 m A
1990	Ibero-American Championships	Manaus, Brazil	–	Hammer throw	NM
1991	South American Championships	Manaus, Brazil	1st	Hammer throw	65.12 m
1992	Ibero-American Championships	Seville, Spain	8th	Shot put	14.99 m
1992	Ibero-American Championships	Seville, Spain	4th	Hammer throw	67.72 m
1994	Ibero-American Championships	Mar del Plata, Argentina	10th	Shot put	15.50 m
1994	Ibero-American Championships	Mar del Plata, Argentina	5th	Hammer throw	65.84 m
1995	Pan American Games	Mar del Plata, Argentina	6th	Shot put	15.89 m
1995	Pan American Games	Mar del Plata, Argentina	7th	Hammer throw	66.38 m
1995	South American Championships	Manaus, Brazil	6th	Shot put	16.03 m
1995	South American Championships	Manaus, Brazil	2nd	Hammer throw	69.04 m
1996	Ibero-American Championships	Medellín, Colombia	5th	Hammer throw	64.36 m
1997	South American Championships	Mar del Plata, Argentina	4th	Shot put	15.45 m
1997	South American Championships	Mar del Plata, Argentina	2nd	Hammer throw	66.36 m
1998	Ibero-American Championships	Lisbon, Portugal	5th	Hammer throw	67.50 m
1999	South American Championships	Bogotá, Colombia	3rd	Hammer throw	64.09 m
1999	Pan American Games	Winnipeg, Canada	5th	Hammer throw	65.55 m
2000	Ibero-American Championships	Rio de Janeiro, Brazil	5th	Hammer throw	66.36 m
2001	South American Championships	Manaus, Brazil	2nd	Hammer throw	69.69 m
2002	Ibero-American Championships	Guatemala City, Guatemala	3rd	Hammer throw	66.71 m
2003	South American Championships	Barquisimeto, Venezuela	7th	Shot put	14.85 m
2003	South American Championships	Barquisimeto, Venezuela	2nd	Hammer throw	67.25 m
2003	Pan American Games	Santo Domingo, Dominican Republic	5th	Hammer throw	68.65 m
2004	Ibero-American Championships	San Fernando, Spain	3rd	Hammer throw	67.89 m
2005	South American Championships	Cali, Colombia	5th	Hammer throw	65.26 m
2006	Ibero-American Championships	Ponce, Puerto Rico	5th	Hammer throw	64.29 m
2006	South American Championships	Tunja, Colombia	4th	Hammer throw	64.90 m
2008	Ibero-American Championships	Iquique, Chile	7th	Hammer throw	61.99 m
2015	World Masters Championships	Lyon, France	M45 2nd	Hammer throw	56.96 m
