= Ramón Jiménez Gaona =

Paraguayan discus thrower

Personal information
- Born: September 10, 1969 (age 57)
- Height: 1.91 m (6 ft 3 in)
- Weight: 107 kg (236 lb)

Sport
- Sport: Discus throw
- Club: California Golden Bears, Berkeley

Ramón Jiménez-Gaona Arellano (born September 10, 1969) is a retired male discus thrower from Paraguay. During the presidency of Horacio Cartes he served as Paraguay's Minister of Public Works.

== Sports career ==
Jiménez-Gaona represented his native country at three consecutive Summer Olympics (1988, 1992 and 1996). He twice won the title at the South American Championships (1993 and 1997).

=== Achievements ===
Year	Competition	Venue	Position	Event	Notes
Representing Paraguay
1984	South American Youth Championships	Tarija, Bolivia	4th	Discus (1.5 kg)	36.64 m
1985	South American Championships	Santiago, Chile	8th	Discus	39.16 m
1985	South American Junior Championships	Santa Fe, Argentina	7th	Shot put	13.72 m
1986	Pan American Junior Championships	Winter Park, United States	7th	Shot put	13.69 m
1986	Pan American Junior Championships	Winter Park, United States	8th	Discus	41.70 m
1986	World Junior Championships	Athens, Greece	17th (q)	Shot put	13.71 m
1986	World Junior Championships	Athens, Greece	23rd (q)	Discus	43.42 m
1986	South American Junior Championships	Quito, Ecuador	6th	Shot put	15.72 m
1986	South American Junior Championships	Quito, Ecuador	3rd	Discus	44.68 m
1987	South American Junior Championships	Santiago, Chile	2nd	Shot put	14.66 m
1987	South American Junior Championships	Santiago, Chile	1st	Discus	46.28 m
1988	South American Junior Championships	Cubatão, Brazil	2nd	Shot put	15.40 m
1988	South American Junior Championships	Cubatão, Brazil	1st	Discus	51.08 m
1988	World Junior Championships	Sudbury, Canada	16th (q)	Shot put	14.73 m
1988	World Junior Championships	Sudbury, Canada	12th	Discus	45.46 m
1988	Olympic Games	Seoul, South Korea	24th (q)	Discus	50.90 m
1990	Ibero-American Championships	Manaus, Brazil	3rd	Discus	56.38 m
1992	Ibero-American Championships	Seville, Spain	4th	Discus	59.78 m
1992	Olympic Games	Barcelona, Spain	16th (q)	Discus	59.78 m
1993	Universiade	Buffalo, United States	4th	Discus	61.40 m
1993	South American Championships	Lima, Peru	1st	Discus	59.46 m
1994	Ibero-American Championships	Mar del Plata, Argentina	1st	Discus	60.42 m
1994	South American Games	Valencia, Venezuela	1st	Discus	57.88 m
1995	Pan American Games	Mar del Plata, Argentina	4th	Discus	59.56 m
1996	Olympic Games	Atlanta, United States	16th (q)	Discus	61.36 m
1997	South American Championships	Mar del Plata, Argentina	1st	Discus	57.32 m

== Education ==
Jiménez-Gaona studied Economics at the University of California, Berkeley. He started out an enterprise in the Paraguayan forestry sector, an activity in which he became a referent.

== Politics ==
In August 2013, President Horacio Cartes appointed Jiménez Gaona to his cabinet as Minister of Public Works.

Olympic Games
Preceded by Max Narváez	Flagbearer for Paraguay; Seoul 1988; Barcelona 1992; Atlanta 1996	Succeeded by Nery Kennedy
