= Liliana Martinelli =

Argentine discus thrower (born 1970)

Personal information
- Born: May 20, 1970 (age 56) Buenos Aires, Argentina

Sport
- Sport: Track and field
Medal record
Athletics
Representing Argentina
South American Games
Gold medal – first place	1990 Lima	Discus throw
Silver medal – second place	1994 Valencia	Discus throw

Liliana María Martinelli (born May 20, 1970) is a retired female discus thrower from Argentina.

== Career ==
She competed in the discus contest at the 1996 Summer Olympics in Atlanta, Georgia. There she ended up in 35th place (55.68 metres). Martinelli set her personal best in the women's discus throw event (58.24 metres) on April 21, 1996 in Buenos Aires.

== International competitions ==
Year	Competition	Venue	Position	Event	Notes
Representing Argentina
1989	South American Junior Championships	Montevideo, Uruguay	2nd	Discus	42.74 m
1990	Ibero-American Championships	Manaus, Brazil	5th	Discus	47.98 m
1990	South American Games	Lima, Peru	1st	Discus	48.00 m AR
1992	Ibero-American Championships	Seville, Spain	7th	Discus	51.10 m
1993	South American Championships	Lima, Peru	6th	Shot put	11.80 m
1993	South American Championships	Lima, Peru	3rd	Discus	52.80 m
1994	Ibero-American Championships	Mar del Plata, Argentina	2nd	Discus	56.18 m
1994	South American Games	Valencia, Venezuela	2nd	Discus	56.74 m
1995	Pan American Games	Mar del Plata, Argentina	5th	Discus	53.92 m
1995	South American Championships	Manaus, Brazil	3rd	Discus	54.32 m
1996	Ibero-American Championships	Medellín, Colombia	5th	Discus	51.94 m
1996	Olympic Games	Atlanta, United States	35th (q)	Discus	55.68 m
1997	South American Championships	Mar del Plata, Argentina	2nd	Discus	52.26 m
1999	South American Championships	Bogotá, Colombia	3rd	Discus	49.11 m
