= 1989 South American Junior Championships in Athletics =

XXI South American Junior Championships in Athletics
- Dates: June 16–19
- Host city: Montevideo, Uruguay
- Level: Junior
- Events: 40
- Participation: about 248 athletes from 10 nations

The 21st South American Junior Championships in Athletics were held in Montevideo, Uruguay, June 16–19, 1989.

== Participation (unofficial) ==
Detailed result lists can be found on the "World Junior Athletics History" website. An unofficial count yields the number of about 248 athletes from about 10 countries: Argentina (52), Bolivia (4), Brazil (59), Chile (30), Colombia (5), Ecuador (10), Paraguay (27), Peru (6), Uruguay (32), Venezuela (23).

== Medal summary ==
Medal winners are published for men and women Complete results can be found on the "World Junior Athletics History" website.

=== Men ===
Event	Gold		Silver		Bronze	
100 metres	Fernando Botasso (BRA)	10.3	Reinaldo Santana (VEN)	10.6	Edgar Chourio (VEN)	10.6
200 metres	Fernando Botasso (BRA)	21.45	Reinaldo Santana (VEN)	21.76	Jorge Méndez (CHI)	22.06
400 metres	Inaldo Sena (BRA)	47.53	Luís Elói (BRA)	48.61	Juan Díaz (VEN)	48.82
800 metres	Edgardo Graglia (ARG)	1:52.06	Ricardo Beltrán (ARG)	1:52.54	Rogério Roque (BRA)	1:52.71
1500 metres	Marcelo Barrientos (CHI)	3:53.57	Ricardo Quesada (CHI)	3:53.88	Marco do Nascimento (BRA)	3:54.09
5000 metres	Marcelo Barrientos (CHI)	14:25.60	Robinson Semolini (BRA)	14:31.18	Alexandre Marques (BRA)	14:42.76
10,000 metres	Alexandre Marques (BRA)	30:18.90	Marcelo Barrientos (CHI)	30:19.46	Néstor Quinapanta (ECU)	30:25.98
110 metres hurdles	Eliexer Pulgar (VEN)	14.61	Fábio Aleixo (BRA)	14.90	Marco Mina (PER)	14.97
400 metres hurdles	Eronilde de Araújo (BRA)	51.12	Paulo Rodrigues (BRA)	53.34	Esdras Paredes (VEN)	54.00
2000 metres steeplechase	José Moraes (BRA)	5:50.54	Almiro Gonçalves (BRA)	5:51.53	Osvaldo Ramírez (PAR)	6:03.31
4 × 100 metres relay	Venezuela; Juan Díaz; Eliecer Pulgar; Edgar Chourio; Reinaldo Santana	41.37	Brazil; Fernando Botasso; Sandro Gonçalves; Adilson da Silva; Haity de Moraes	41.43	Argentina; Maximiliano Rohn; Gustavo Trapani; Rafael Allende; Guillermo Cacián	42.29
4 × 400 metres relay	Brazil; Inaldo de Sena; Luís Eloi; Eronilde de Araújo; Paulo Rodrigues	3:14.84	Venezuela; Armando Sufia; Jesús Ochoa; Juan Díaz; Nogales	3:17.38	Argentina; Rafael Allende; Guillermo Cacián; Miguel Pérez; Roman Serra	3:20.51
10,000 metres track walk	Jefferson Pérez (ECU)	45:03.71	Ademar Kammler (BRA)	45:09.37	Pedro do Araújo (BRA)	47:07.89
High jump	Cristián Kraemer (CHI)	2.12	Fernando Damonte (ARG)	2.05	Tomislav Muhvic-Pintar (PER); Jairo Venâncio (BRA)	2.02
Pole vault	Cristián Aspillaga (CHI)	4.50	Rodrigo Casacurta (BRA)	4.40	Andrés Aspillaga (CHI)	4.30
Long jump	Ramão de Oliveira (BRA)	7.15	Ricardo Bettiol (ARG)	6.99	Jefferson Ilário (BRA)	6.98
Triple jump	Jairo Venâncio (BRA)	15.47	Jefferson Ilário (BRA)	15.23	Oscar Valiente (PER)	14.88
Shot put	Yojer Medina (VEN)	14.94	Acassio da Silva (BRA)	14.71	Raimundo Monasterio (VEN)	14.38
Discus throw	Vicente Araujo (VEN)	47.00	Yojer Medina (VEN)	46.72	Marcelino Insúa (ARG)	44.08
Hammer throw	Alexandre Mantovani (BRA)	56.80	Claudio Henschke (ARG)	52.50	Jorge Pereira (VEN)	48.42
Javelin throw	Pedro Claure (CHI)	59.68	Celso Kochem (BRA)	59.66	Alfredo Corvo (VEN)	59.00
Decathlon	Marco Antônio Brito (BRA)	6171	Renny Pérez (VEN)	5907	Sérgio Oliveira (BRA)	5547

=== Women ===
Event	Gold		Silver		Bronze	
100 metres	Jupira da Graça (BRA)	11.95	Denise Sharpe (ARG)	12.00	Emy Ochoa (VEN)	12.18
200 metres	Jupira da Graça (BRA)	24.06	Denise Sharpe (ARG)	24.49	Claudete Alves Pina (BRA)	24.55
400 metres	Claudete Alves Pina (BRA)	54.89	Luciana Mendes (BRA)	55.49	Claudia Riquelme (CHI)	55.59
800 metres	Célia dos Santos (BRA)	2:08.11	Mabel Arrúa (ARG)	2:08.46	Janeth Caizalitín (ECU)	2:12.97
1500 metres	Mabel Arrúa (ARG)	4:29.93	Célia dos Santos (BRA)	4:32.28	Janeth Caizalitín (ECU)	4:32.84
3000 metres	Janeth Caizalitín (ECU)	9:32.03	Alina Karwowski (BRA)	9:38.33	Lidia Karwowski (BRA)	9:38.40
10,000 metres	Sandra Ruales (ECU)	34:56.80	Lidia Karwowski (BRA)	35:32.64	Soledad Nieto (ECU)	35:37.92
100 metres hurdles	Maria Luna (BRA)	14.32	Adriana Davin (BRA)	14.33	Graciela Pugliese (ARG)	14.48
400 metres hurdles	América Inácio (BRA)	61.97	Claudia Riquelme (CHI)	62.85	Josefa Castro (VEN)	63.05
4 × 100 metres relay	Brazil; Adriana Raulino; Maria Luna; Jupira da Graça; Claudete Alves Pina	47.32	Chile; María González; Judith de la Fuente; Lisette Rondón; Claudia Riquelme; Venezuela; Ana Cecilia Amaya; Josefa Castro; Emy Ochoa; Florinda Méndez	48.18		
4 × 400 metres relay	Brazil; America Inacio; Claudete Alves Pina; Jupira da Graça; Luciana Mendes	3:40.7	Argentina; Graciela Pugliese; Melina Symeonides; Mabel Arrua; Viviana Maldonado	3:52.1	Uruguay; Ana Alfie; Marcela Tiscornia; Veronica Abel; Laura Abel	3:52.3
5000 metres track walk	Miriam Ramón (ECU)	23:23.77	Luisa Nivicela (ECU)	23:23.78	Patricia Rojas (COL)	24:43.10
High jump	Claudia Blotto (ARG)	1.69	Alejandra Chomalí (CHI)	1.66	Andrea Ávila (ARG)	1.66
Long jump	Andrea Ávila (ARG)	5.98	Natalia Toledo (PAR)	5.82	Luciana dos Santos (BRA)	5.64
Shot put	Elisângela Adriano (BRA)	14.40	Alexandra Amaro (BRA)	13.57	Claudia Hahn (ARG)	12.14
Discus throw	Alexandra Amaro (BRA)	43.92	Liliana Martinelli (ARG)	42.74	Elisângela Adriano (BRA)	42.70
Javelin throw	Natalia Toledo (PAR)	45.46	Verónica Prieto (COL)	44.82	Claudia Hahn (ARG)	42.02
Heptathlon	Euzinete dos Reis (BRA)	4872	Vera Alves (BRA)	4664	Carolina Sanz (CHI)	4653

== Medal table (unofficial) ==
* Host nation (Uruguay)

Rank	Nation	Gold	Silver	Bronze	Total
1	Brazil (BRA)	22	18	11	51
2	Chile (CHI)	5	5	4	14
3	Argentina (ARG)	4	9	7	20
4	Venezuela (VEN)	4	6	8	18
5	Ecuador (ECU)	4	1	4	9
6	Paraguay (PAR)	1	1	1	3
7	Colombia (COL)	0	1	1	2
8	Peru (PER)	0	0	3	3
9	Uruguay (URU)*	0	0	1	1
Totals (9 entries)		40	41	40	121
