= 1987 South American Junior Championships in Athletics =

XIX South American Junior Championships in Athletics
- Dates: September 24–27
- Host city: Santiago, Chile
- Level: Junior
- Events: 38
- Participation: about 251 athletes from 10 nations

The 19th South American Junior Championships in Athletics were held in Santiago, Chile from September 24–27, 1987.

== Participation (unofficial) ==
Detailed result lists can be found on the "World Junior Athletics History" website. An unofficial count yields the number of about 251 athletes from about 10 countries: Argentina (50), Bolivia (8), Brazil (49), Chile (51), Colombia (5), Ecuador (17), Paraguay (13), Peru (27), Uruguay (14), Venezuela (17).

== Medal summary ==
Medal winners are published for men and women Complete results can be found on the "World Junior Athletics History" website.

=== Men ===
Event	Gold		Silver		Bronze	
100 metres	Gerardo Meinardi (ARG)	10.64	Néstor Soncini (ARG)	10.75	Fernando Botasso (BRA)	10.79
200 metres	Gerardo Meinardi (ARG)	21.41	Carlos Gats (ARG)	21.52	Jessé de Souza (BRA)	21.93
400 metres	Charles Bodington (VEN)	47.67	Inaldo Sena (BRA)	48.26	Piero Chichizola (PER)	49.13
800 metres	Charles Bodington (VEN)	1:51.26	Juan Navarro (VEN)	1:51.81	Adauto da Silva (BRA)	1:51.84
1500 metres	Clodoaldo do Carmo (BRA)	3:57.45	Adauto da Silva (BRA)	3:57.63	Reinaldo Camacho (PER)	4:00.88
5000 metres	Clodoaldo do Carmo (BRA)	14:25.17	Valdenor dos Santos (BRA)	14:29.75	Eduardo Carrasco (CHI)	14:30.31
110 metres hurdles	Javier del Río (PER)	14.74	Fábio Aleixo (BRA)	14.82	Erasmo Ceballos (ARG)	15.64
400 metres hurdles	Fábio Aleixo (BRA)	52.39	Pedro Bakovic (CHI)	52.64	Paulo Rodrigues (BRA)	53.02
2000 metres steeplechase	Wander Moura (BRA)	5:46.94	Leonardo Malgor (ARG)	5:49.86	Alexandre Coutinho (BRA)	5:53.63
4 × 100 metres relay	Argentina	41.41	Brazil	41.95	Peru	42.23
4 × 400 metres relay	Brazil	3:15.01	Argentina	3:15.52	Peru; Pedro Velarde; Piero Chichizola; Javier del Rio; Guillermo Ghersi	3:16.96
10,000 metres track walk	Juan Rojas (ECU)	43:20.6	Juan Canevaro (CHI)	45:20.0	Sérgio Galdino (BRA)	46:17.8
High jump	Arnaldo Gorziglia (CHI)	2.00	Alejandro Terzián (ARG)	1.95	Guerrino Zani (BRA)	1.95
Pole vault	Konstantín Zagustín (VEN)	4.60	Martín Bossio (ARG)	4.40	Marcos Guzmán (ECU)	4.30
Long jump	Paulo de Oliveira (BRA)	7.14	Ricardo Valiente (PER)	7.09	Juan Carlos Moeckel (CHI)	7.08
Triple jump	Ricardo Valiente (PER)	16.07	Sergio Saavedra (VEN)	15.45	Julio da Costa (BRA)	15.18
Shot put	Valmir Campos (BRA)	14.72	Ramón Jiménez (PAR)	14.66	Paulo Nasvim (BRA)	13.76
Discus throw	Ramón Jiménez (PAR)	46.28	Marcelo Pugliese (ARG)	44.12	Ricardo Moreno (ARG)	43.50
Hammer throw	Adrián Marzo (ARG)	60.88	Marcelo Pugliese (ARG)	59.66	Alexandre Mantovani (BRA)	53.20
Javelin throw	Orion Pedroso (BRA)	63.78	Rodrigo Zelaya (CHI)	62.98	Mario Alaniz (URU)	58.10
Decathlon	Carlos Magno de Araújo (BRA)	6507	Juan Carlos Moeckel (CHI)	6383	Ivan Costa (BRA)	6198

=== Women ===
Event	Gold		Silver		Bronze	
100 metres	Ximena Restrepo (COL)	11.69	Milagros Allende (ARG)	12.02	Rita Gomes (BRA)	12.12
200 metres	Ximena Restrepo (COL)	23.72	Jupira da Graça (BRA)	24.56	Milagros Allende (ARG)	24.69
400 metres	Sidnéia Franco (BRA)	56.21	Claudia Riquelme (CHI)	56.66	Paola Gianna (ARG)	58.67
800 metres	Célia dos Santos (BRA)	2:13.68	Mabel Arrúa (ARG)	2:14.86	Mónica Vilches (ARG)	2:15.15
1500 metres	Célia dos Santos (BRA)	4:37.04	Valeria Martínez (ARG)	4:37.29	Roxana Coronatti (ARG)	4:38.68
3000 metres	Valeria Martínez (ARG)	9:50.68	María Medina (ECU)	9:57.71	Roxana Coronatti (ARG)	10:03.55
100 metres hurdles	Carolina Gutiérrez (ARG)	14.42	Mariana Albertsen (ARG)	15.06	Ana María Núñez (URU)	15.18
400 metres hurdles	Ana María Núñez (URU)	62.74	Sidnéia Franco (BRA)	62.92	Anabella von Kesselstatt (ARG)	63.05
4 × 100 metres relay	Brazil ? ? Rita Gomes; Jupira da Graça	46.62	Argentina ? Elizabeth Minetti; Soledad Serra; Milagros Allende	47.38	Chile ? ? ? Soledad Bacarezza	47.76
4 × 400 metres relay	Brazil	3:47.65	Chile	3:50.48	Argentina	3:51.86
High jump	Claudia Blotto (ARG)	1.68	Ana Lúcia Silva (BRA)	1.68	María Isabel Rubio (CHI)	1.68
Long jump	Ana Martina Vizioli (ARG)	5.89	María Isabel Rubio (CHI)	5.77	Andrea Ávila (ARG)	5.68
Shot put	Lila Morales (VEN)	12.80	Berta Gómez (COL)	12.43	Alexandra Amaro (BRA)	12.32
Discus throw	Berta Gómez (COL)	45.28	Elizabeth dos Santos (BRA)	40.95	Silvia Decoud (ARG)	39.20
Javelin throw	Berta Gómez (COL)	49.24	Alexandra Dumas (BRA)	47.90	Rosemeire Costa (BRA)	46.66
Heptathlon	Carolina Gutiérrez (ARG)	4758	Alexandra Dumas (BRA)	4442	Natalia Toledo (PAR)	4414

== Medal table (unofficial) ==
* Host nation (Chile)

Rank	Nation	Gold	Silver	Bronze	Total
1	Brazil (BRA)	14	11	14	39
2	Argentina (ARG)	9	13	11	33
3	Venezuela (VEN)	4	2	0	6
4	Colombia (COL)	4	1	0	5
5	Peru (PER)	2	1	4	7
6	Chile (CHI)*	1	7	4	12
7	Ecuador (ECU)	1	1	1	3
7	Paraguay (PAR)	1	1	1	3
9	Uruguay (URU)	1	0	2	3
Totals (9 entries)		37	37	37	111
