= 1993 South American Championships in Athletics =

- Dates: 2–4 July
- Host city: Lima, Peru
- Venue: Villa Deportiva Nacional
- Events: 41
- Participation: 216 athletes from 11 nations

The 1993 South American Championships in Athletics were held in Lima, Peru on 2, 3 and 4 July. This was the first edition to feature women's triple jump and the last to feature women's 3000 metres (later replaced by 5000 metres).

== Medal summary ==
=== Men's events ===
Event	Gold		Silver		Bronze	
100 metres (wind: -4.6 m/s)	Robson da Silva; Brazil	10.58	Arnaldo da Silva; Brazil	10.69	Óscar Fernández; Peru	10.73
200 metres (wind: -2.9 m/s)	Robson da Silva; Brazil	20.90	André da Silva; Brazil	21.10	Wilson Cañizales; Colombia	21.60
400 metres	Wilson Cañizales; Colombia	46.50	Inaldo Sena; Brazil	47.50	Alejandro Krauss; Chile	47.60
800 metres	Pablo Squella; Chile	1:51.98	Luis Migueles; Argentina	1:52.12	Peter Gross; Chile	1:52.24
1500 metres	Adauto Domingues; Brazil	3:46.40	Pablo Squella; Chile	3:51.00	Marcelo Cascabelo; Argentina	3:51.50
5000 metres	Ronaldo da Costa; Brazil	13:58.70	Valdenor dos Santos; Brazil	13:59.80	Juan José Castillo; Peru	13:59.90
10,000 metres	Antonio Silio; Argentina	28:37.20 CR	Juan José Castillo; Peru	28:56.80	Valdenor dos Santos; Brazil	29:20.40
3000 metres steeplechase	Adauto Domingues; Brazil	8:36.90	Marcelo Cascabelo; Argentina	8:38.80	Oscar Amaya; Argentina	8:48.90
110 metres hurdles (wind: -2.5 m/s)	Pedro Chiamulera; Brazil	14.30	Joilto Bonfim; Brazil	14.38	Ricardo D'Andrilli; Argentina	14.75
400 metres hurdles	Eronilde de Araújo; Brazil	49.80	Pedro Chiamulera; Brazil	50.10	Llimy Rivas; Colombia	50.70
4 × 100 metres relay	Chile; Sebastián Keitel; Carlos Moreno; Álvaro Prenafeta; Juan Francisco Cobo	40.20	Peru; Óscar Fernández; Javier Verme; Marco Mautino; José Uribe	41.20	Venezuela; Richard Kristen; Jorge Luis Cañizales; Ángel Tovar; Abraham Abreu	41.80
4 × 400 metres relay	Brazil; Eronilde de Araújo; Pedro Chiamulera; Inaldo Sena; Geraldo de Assis	3:09.0	Colombia; Wilson Cañizales; Luis Vega; Wenceslao Ferrín; Llimy Rivas	3:09.1	Chile; Álvaro Prenafeta; Carlos Morales; Sebastián Keitel; Alejandro Krauss	3:09.5
20 kilometres road walk	Jefferson Pérez; Ecuador	1:24:31	Querubín Moreno; Colombia	1:24:50	Orlando Díaz; Colombia	1:26:57
High jump	Hugo Muñoz; Peru	2.22 CR	Fernando Moreno; Argentina	2.16	José Luís Mendes; Brazil	2.16
Pole vault	Oscar Veit; Argentina	4.95	Fernando Pastoriza; Argentina	4.80	Cristián Aspillaga; Chile	4.70
Long jump	Paulo de Oliveira; Brazil	7.99w	Abraham Abreu; Venezuela	7.60	Ricardo Valiente; Peru	7.38w
Triple jump	Anísio Silva; Brazil	17.21 CR	Ricardo Valiente; Peru	16.45	Avelino de Souza; Brazil	16.31
Shot put	Adilson Oliveira; Brazil	17.88	Yojer Medina; Venezuela	17.52	João dos Santos; Brazil	16.76
Discus throw	Ramón Jiménez Gaona; Paraguay	59.46 CR	João dos Santos; Brazil	55.28	Yojer Medina; Venezuela	52.90
Hammer throw	Andrés Charadia; Argentina	71.14 CR	Marcelo Pugliese; Argentina	67.36	José Manuel Llano; Chile	57.44
Javelin throw	Rodrigo Zelaya; Chile	72.86	Luiz Fernando da Silva; Brazil	70.56	Ivan Costa; Brazil	68.48
Decathlon	José de Assis; Brazil	6861	Edemar dos Santos; Brazil	6598	Arturo Rodríguez; Chile	6381

=== Women's events ===
Event	Gold		Silver		Bronze	
100 metres (wind: -2.9 m/s)	Cleide Amaral; Brazil	11.91	Patricia Rodríguez; Colombia	12.10	Kátia de Jesus Santos; Brazil	12.22
200 metres (wind: -3.4 m/s)	Patricia Rodríguez; Colombia	24.2	Kátia de Jesus Santos; Brazil	24.6	Olga Conte; Argentina	24.7
400 metres	Maria Figueirêdo; Brazil	52.67	Luciana Mendes; Brazil	53.06	Sara Montecinos; Chile	53.73
800 metres	Maria Figueirêdo; Brazil	2:04.2	Luciana Mendes; Brazil	2:04.5	Sara Montecinos; Chile	2:06.4
1500 metres	Soraya Telles; Brazil	4:23.10	Alejandra Ramos; Chile	4:31.40	Miriam Achote; Ecuador	4:31.90
3000 metres	Marilú Salazar; Peru	9:44.9	Griselda González; Argentina	9:45.5	Alejandra Ramos; Chile	9:52.1
10,000 metres	Carmem de Oliveira; Brazil	33:49.80	Marilú Salazar; Peru	33:57.80	Martha Tenorio; Ecuador	34:04.40
100 metres hurdles (wind: -2.6 m/s)	Vânia dos Santos; Brazil	14.26	Vânia da Silva; Brazil	14.28	Anabella von Kesselstatt; Argentina	14.30
400 metres hurdles	Anabella von Kesselstatt; Argentina	57.2	Jupira da Graça; Brazil	57.4	Tatiana Espinosa; Peru	65.8
4 × 100 metres relay	Brazil; Cleide Amaral; Jupira da Graca; Kátia Regina Santos; Vânia dos Santos	45.1	Argentina; Virginia Lebreo; Olga Conte; Daniela Lebreo; Anabella Von Kesselstatt	45.9	Chile; Lisette Rondón; Alejandra Martínez; Sara Montecinos; Judith de la Fuente	46.5
4 × 400 metres relay	Brazil; Maria Magnólia Figueiredo; Jupira da Graça; Luciana Mendes; Soraya Telles	3:36.49	Argentina; Virginia Lebreo; Olga Conte; Daniela Lebreo; Anabella Von Kesselstatt	3:43.42	Chile; Lisette Rondón; Sara Montecinos; Hannelore Grosser; Marcela Barros	3:43.43
10,000 metres track walk	Miriam Ramón; Ecuador	48:18.0 CR	Geovana Irusta; Bolivia	53:06.5	Giovanna Morejón; Bolivia	57:45.6
High jump	Orlane dos Santos; Brazil	1.87	Alejandra García; Argentina	1.84	Alejandra Chomalí; Chile	1.75
Long jump	Andrea Ávila; Argentina	6.45w	Maria de Souza; Brazil	6.26 =CR	Gilda Massa; Peru	6.00w
Triple jump	Andrea Ávila; Argentina	13.91 CR NR	Maria de Souza; Brazil	12.77w	Conceição Geremias; Brazil	12.71
Shot put	Elisângela Adriano; Brazil	16.47 CR	María Isabel Urrutia; Colombia	15.09	Carmen Chalá; Ecuador	14.83
Discus throw	María Isabel Urrutia; Colombia	55.14 CR	Elisângela Adriano; Brazil	53.16	Liliana Martinelli; Argentina	52.80
Javelin throw	Carla Bispo; Brazil	49.20	Zorobabelia Córdoba; Colombia	48.74	Isabel Ordóñez; Ecuador	42.66
Heptathlon	Zorobabelia Córdoba; Colombia	5410	Conceição Geremias; Brazil	5105	Elizabeth Arteaga; Bolivia	4282

== Medal table ==
Rank	Nation	Gold	Silver	Bronze	Total
1	Brazil	23	18	7	48
2	Argentina	6	9	6	21
3	Colombia	4	5	3	12
4	Chile	3	2	12	17
5	Peru	2	4	5	11
6	Ecuador	2	0	4	6
7	Paraguay	1	0	0	1
8	Venezuela	0	2	2	4
9	Bolivia	0	1	2	3
Totals (9 entries)		41	41	41	123

== Participating nations ==
- Argentina (26)
- Bolivia (14)
- Brazil (38)
- Chile (30)
- Colombia (13)
- Ecuador (25)
- Panama (1)
- Paraguay (1)
- Peru (52)
- Uruguay (4)
- Venezuela (12)

== See also ==
- 1993 in athletics (track and field)
