= Athletics at the 1999 Pan American Games – Men's hammer throw =

Men's hammer throw at the Pan American Games

The men's hammer throw event at the 1999 Pan American Games was held on July 27.

== Results ==
Rank	Name	Nationality	#1	#2	#3	#4	#5	#6	Result	Notes
1st place, gold medalist(s)	Lance Deal	United States	79.61	x	x	76.54	78.74	78.69	79.61	GR
2nd place, silver medalist(s)	Kevin McMahon	United States	72.30	73.24	71.66	68.37	73.41	72.17	73.41	
3rd place, bronze medalist(s)	Juan Ignacio Cerra	Argentina	70.68	70.06	x	70.58	x	x	70.68	
4	John Stoikos	Canada	66.87	66.76	x	67.18	66.76	64.92	67.18	
5	Adrián Marzo	Argentina	65.55	65.39	64.69	x	x	x	65.55	
	Yosvany Suárez	Cuba							DNS	
