= Cristián Aspillaga =

Chilean pole vaulter

Personal information
- Full name: Cristián Alberto Aspillaga Finlay
- Nationality: Chilean
- Born: 25 February 1970 (age 56)

Sport
- Sport: Athletics
- Event: Pole vault
Medal record
Representing Chile
South American Games
Silver medal – second place	1990 Lima	Pole vault
Silver medal – second place	1994 Valencia	Pole vault

Cristián Alberto Aspillaga Finlay (born 25 February 1970) is a retired Chilean athlete who specialised in the pole vault. He won multiple medals at regional level.

His personal best on the event is 5.20 metres set in Santiago de Chile in 1992.

== International competitions ==
Year	Competition	Venue	Position	Notes
Representing Chile
1988	South American Junior Championships	Cubatão, Brazil	2nd	4.30 m
1989	South American Junior Championships	Montevideo, Uruguay	1st	4.50 m
1989	Pan American Junior Championships	Santa Fe, Argentina	2nd	4.60 m
1989	South American Championships	Medellín, Colombia	1st	4.60 m
1990	Ibero-American Championships	Manaus, Brazil	7th	4.70 m
1990	South American Games	Lima, Peru	2nd	4.90 m
1991	South American Championships	Manaus, Brazil	1st	5.00 m
1991	Pan American Games	Havana, Cuba	7th	4.70 m
1992	Ibero-American Championships	Seville, Spain	5th	5.00 m
1993	South American Championships	Lima, Peru	3rd	4.70 m
1994	Ibero-American Championships	Mar del Plata, Argentina	4th	5.00 m
1994	South American Games	Valencia, Venezuela	2nd	5.00 m
1995	Pan American Games	Mar del Plata, Argentina	7th	5.00 m
1995	South American Championships	Manaus, Brazil	1st	4.70 m
1995	Pacific Ocean Games	Cali, Colombia	1st	5.10 m
1995	Universiade	Fukuoka, Japan	18th (q)	5.00 m
1997	South American Championships	Mar del Plata, Argentina	4th	4.60 m
1998	Ibero-American Championships	Lisbon, Portugal	7th	5.00 m
1999	South American Championships	Bogotá, Colombia	3rd	5.00 m
