= Ademar Kammler =

Brazilian racewalker

Personal information
- Nationality: Brazilian
- Born: 24 May 1970 (age 56)

Sport
- Sport: Athletics
- Event: Racewalking
Medal record
Men's athletics
Representing Brazil
South American U20 Championships
| Bronze medal – third place | 1988 Cubatão | 10,000 m walk |
| Silver medal – second place | 1989 Montevideo | 10,000 m walk |
South American Race Walking Championships
| Silver medal – second place | 1992 São Paulo | 20 km walk |
| Bronze medal – third place | 1996 São Paulo | 20 km walk |
South American Championships
| Bronze medal – third place | 1995 Manaus | 20,000 m walk |

Ademar Kammler (born 24 May 1970) is a Brazilian racewalker. He won medals at the South American Race Walking Championships and South American Championships in Athletics, and competed in the men's 20 kilometres walk at the 1992 Summer Olympics.

== Career ==
Kammler began training for athletics in the early 1980s and learned about racewalking in 1983 from the Olimpíadas Estudantis. He won his first-ever racewalking competition in 1984.

After breaking a Santa Catarina record in racewalking, he trained with a team from Chapecó. He changed to the Concórdia team in 1987.

Kammler won a bronze medal in the 10,000 metres track walk at the 1988 South American Junior Championships in Athletics. He improved to a silver medal at the 1989 championships, walking 45:09.37 minutes.

At the 1989 Brazilian U19 Athletics Championships, Kammler broke a South American racewalking record to win his race.

He finished 15th at the 1990 Pan American Race Walking Cup in 1:36:31. The following year at the 1991 IAAF World Race Walking Cup, Kammler finished 90th over 20 km in 1:37:44 hours.

On 12 April 1992, Kammler finished runner-up at a 20 km walk race in Maringá. He walked a time of 1:22:56 to set a personal best. Later that year at the Olympics, he started the 20 km walk but did not finish the race. At the 1992 South American Race Walking Championships in São Paulo, Kammler won the silver medal in the 20 km walk with a time of 1:26:45.

At the 1993 World Indoor Championships 5000 m walk, Kammler was disqualified in the second heat. He finished 25th in 1:29:02 at the 1993 IAAF World Race Walking Cup. He improved to 13th in 1:28:38 at the 1994 Pan American Race Walking Cup.

Kammler started but did not finish the 1995 IAAF World Race Walking Cup in Beijing. He won his first South American Athletics Championships bronze medal in the 20,000 metres walk at the 1995 South American Championships in Athletics in a time of 1:32:17.9.

At the 1996 Ibero-American Championships, Kammler competed in the 20 km walk finals but finished outside the top eight. He won another medal at the 1996 South American Race Walking Championships, walking 1:29:17 to place 3rd. On 18 May 1996, Kammler walked 1:24:47.8 to win a racewalking competition in Rio de Janeiro. He did not finish the 1996 Pan American Race Walking Cup and did not run at the 1996 Olympics.

Kammler was 69th in 1:25:46 at the 1997 IAAF World Race Walking Cup. He entered in the 20 km walk at the 1997 World University Games, but did not finish the race.

== Personal life ==
Kammler was born in Chapecó, Santa Catarina and moved to Maravilha, Santa Catarina when he was three years old. In the 1980s, he worked part-time at Caixa Econômica Federal while training to support his family.

After 1989, Kammler moved to Florianópolis and trained with athlete Alexandre Vaz. He returned to Chapecó in 1993 and retired from competition in 2004.

He received a degree in physical education and works as a referee and athletics coach.
