= Douglas de Souza =

Brazilian long jumper

Personal information
- Born: 6 August 1972 São Bernardo do Campo, Brazil
- Died: 13 December 1998 (aged 26)

Sport
- Sport: Track and field
Medal record
Representing Brazil
South American Championships
Gold medal – first place	1995 Manaus	Long jump
IAAF World Cup
Silver medal – second place	1994 London	Long jump

Douglas de Souza (6 August 1972 – 13 December 1998) was a Brazilian track and field athlete who specialised in the long jump. He represented his country at the 1995 World Championships in Athletics and the 1996 Summer Olympics, competing in the qualifying rounds only.

Born in São Bernardo do Campo, he grew into a tall and muscular athlete at 1.94 m and 88 kg. De Souza was a three-time winner at the Brazilian Athletics Championships, taking wins in 1994, 1996 and 1998. His jumps of 8.20 m (26 ft 10 3/4 in) then 8.29 m (27 ft 2 1/4 in) were championship record marks. His lifetime best of 8.40 m (27 ft 6 1/2 in), achieved in São Paulo on 15 February 1995, is the Brazilian national record for the long jump and was a South American record at the time, standing until 2006, at which point it was beaten by Panamanian Irving Saladino.

He enjoyed international success at the 1994 IAAF World Cup, taking silver behind Fred Salle, and at the 1995 South American Championships in Athletics, where his winning jump of 8.05 m (26 ft 4 3/4 in) was a championship record that stood for a decade. He ranked seventh on the global lists for the 1995 season and remained in the top twenty in 1996 with a best of 8.29 m (27 ft 2 1/4 in).

His life and career were cut short as he died in a car accident at the age of twenty-six in 1998.

== International competitions ==
Year	Competition	Venue	Position	Event	Notes
1994	World Cup	London, United Kingdom	2nd	Long jump	7.96 m
1995	South American Championships	Manaus, Brazil	1st	Long jump	8.05 m CR
1995	World Championships	Gothenburg, Sweden	15th (q)	Long jump	7.63 m
1996	Olympic Games	Atlanta, United States	33rd (q)	Long jump	7.61 m
1997	Universiade	Catania, Italy	11th	Long jump	7.55 m

== National titles ==
- Brazilian Athletics Championships
  - Long jump: 1994, 1996, 1998
