= Jupira da Graça =

Brazilian retired athlete (born 1970)

Personal information
- Full name: Jupira Maurina da Graça Oliveira
- Born: 20 February 1970 (age 55)

Sport
- Sport: Athletics
- Event(s): 200 m, 400 m hurdles

Jupira Maurina da Graça Oliveira (born 20 February 1970) is a retired Brazilian athlete who competed in sprinting and hurdling events. She represented her country in the 400 metres hurdles at the 1993 World Championships in Athletics without reaching the semifinals.

== International competitions ==
Year	Competition	Venue	Position	Event	Notes
Representing Brazil
1984	South American Youth Championships	Comodoro Rivadavia, Argentina	1st	200 m	25.70
1984	South American Youth Championships	Comodoro Rivadavia, Argentina	1st	400 m	57.1
1984	South American Youth Championships	Comodoro Rivadavia, Argentina	1st	4 × 100 m relay	49.9
1986	Pan American Junior Championships	Winter Park, United States	5th	400 m	55.07
1986	World Junior Championships	Athens, Greece	26th (h)	200 m	25.03
1986	World Junior Championships	Athens, Greece	20th (h)	400 m	56.37
1986	South American Junior Championships	Quito, Ecuador	2nd	200 m	24.77
1986	South American Junior Championships	Quito, Ecuador	1st	4 × 400 m relay	3:52.69
1986	South American Youth Championships	Comodoro Rivadavia, Argentina	1st	200 m	26.2
1986	South American Youth Championships	Comodoro Rivadavia, Argentina	1st	400 m	56.96
1987	South American Junior Championships	Santiago, Chile	5th	100 m	12.25
1987	South American Junior Championships	Santiago, Chile	2nd	200 m	24.56
1987	South American Junior Championships	Santiago, Chile	1st	4 × 100 m relay	46.62
1987	South American Championships	São Paulo, Brazil	6th	200 m	24.57
1987	South American Championships	São Paulo, Brazil	2nd	4 × 100 m relay	45.78
1988	South American Junior Championships	Cubatão, Brazil	1st	200 m	24.34
1988	South American Junior Championships	Cubatão, Brazil	1st	4 × 100 m relay	45.82
1988	South American Junior Championships	Cubatão, Brazil	1st	4 × 400 m relay	3:41.52
1988	World Junior Championships	Sudbury, Canada	19th (sf)	200 m	24.34 (w)
1989	South American Junior Championships	Montevideo, Uruguay	1st	100 m	11.95
1989	South American Junior Championships	Montevideo, Uruguay	1st	200 m	24.06
1989	South American Junior Championships	Montevideo, Uruguay	1st	4 × 100 m relay	47.32
1989	South American Junior Championships	Montevideo, Uruguay	1st	4 × 400 m relay	3:40.7
1989	Pan American Junior Championships	Santa Fe, Argentina	2nd	200 m	24.04
1989	Pan American Junior Championships	Santa Fe, Argentina	3rd	4 × 100 m relay	46.72
1989	Pan American Junior Championships	Santa Fe, Argentina	3rd	4 × 400 m relay	3:40.87
1989	South American Championships	Medellín, Colombia	2nd	200 m	23.44
1989	South American Championships	Medellín, Colombia	1st	4 × 100 m relay	44.69
1989	South American Championships	Medellín, Colombia	2nd	4 × 400 m relay	3:37.7
1991	South American Championships	Manaus, Brazil	1st	4 × 400 m relay	3:32.59
1992	Ibero-American Championships	Seville, Spain	3rd	400 m hurdles	58.32
1993	South American Championships	Lima, Peru	2nd	400 m hurdles	57.4
1993	South American Championships	Lima, Peru	1st	4 × 100 m relay	45.1
1993	South American Championships	Lima, Peru	1st	4 × 400 m relay	3:36.49
1993	World Championships	Stuttgart, Germany	24th (h)	400 m hurdles	58.79
1998	Ibero-American Championships	Lisbon, Portugal	4th	400 m hurdles	58.92
2000	Ibero-American Championships	Rio de Janeiro, Brazil	2nd	400 m hurdles	58.48
2000	Ibero-American Championships	Rio de Janeiro, Brazil	3rd	4 × 400 m relay	3:36.07

== Personal bests ==
Outdoor

- 100 metres – 11.95 (Montevideo 1989)
- 200 metres – 23.41 (1.6 m/s, A, Medellín 1989)
- 400 metres – 53.62 (Curitiba 1998)
- 400 metres hurdles – 57.29 (Americana 2000)
