= 1984 South American Youth Championships in Athletics =

VII South American Youth Championships in Athletics
- Dates: September 13–16
- Host city: Tarija, Bolivia
- Level: Youth
- Events: 34
- Participation: about 136 athletes from 7 nations

The 7th South American Youth Championships in Athletics were held in Tarija, Bolivia from September 13–16, 1984.

== Medal summary ==
Medal winners are published for boys and girls. Complete results can be found on the "World Junior Athletics History" website. All results are marked as "affected by altitude" (A), because Tarija is located at 1,854 metres above sea level.

=== Men ===
Event	Gold		Silver		Bronze	
100 metres	Luís Mattos (BRA)	11.0A	Marcelo Ducart (ARG)	11.1A	Miguel Huamán (PER)	11.2A
200 metres	Luís Mattos (BRA)	22.8A	Miguel Huamán (PER)	23.2A	Claudio Galdos (PER)	23.3A
400 metres	Arovaldo Silva (BRA)	51.0A	Antônio de Oliveira (BRA)	52.7A	Héctor Villarraga (COL)	53.7A
800 metres	Antônio de Oliveira (BRA)	2:02.1A	Vital Santo (BRA)	2:02.6A	Javier Ferrario (ARG)	2:03.5A
1500 metres	Clodoaldo do Carmo (BRA)	4:10.0A	Vital Santo (BRA)	4:10.1A	José Castillo (PER)	4:20.0A
3000 metres	Clodoaldo do Carmo (BRA)	9:00.1A	Alexandre César (BRA)	9:19.8A	José Castillo (PER)	9:19.9A
1500 metres steeplechase	Clodoaldo do Carmo (BRA)	4:25.2A	Vital Santo (BRA)	4:33.2A	Fuad Ramos (BOL)	4:50.4A
110 metres hurdles	Marcelo Ducart (ARG)	14.4A	Javier del Río (PER)	15.7A	Luis de la Cruz (PER)	15.8A
300 metres hurdles	Alexandre da Silva (BRA)	40.8A	Ariel Pintos (ARG)	41.6A	Eduardo Lloret (PAR)	41.9A
High jump	Humberto Sarubbi (PAR)	1.95A	Aníbal Folmer (ARG)	1.86A	Jorge Oliveira (BRA)	1.80A
Pole vault	Martín Bossio (ARG)	3.60A	Orestes Menegas (BRA)	3.50A		
Long jump	Paulo de Oliveira (BRA)	6.66A	Marcelo Ducart (ARG)	6.58A	Erwin Arteaga (BOL)	6.42A
Triple jump	Caio Rocha (BRA)	14.14A	Ricardo Valiente (PER)	13.69A	Luis Mércuri (ARG)	13.59A
Shot put	Raúl Folmer (ARG)	15.78A	Ricardo Romero (ARG)	14.97A	Gustavo Barreto (BRA)	13.52A
Discus throw	Ricardo Romero (ARG)	46.78A	Raúl Folmer (ARG)	41.44A	Cristiano Corone (BRA)	40.40A
Hammer throw	Adrián Marzo (ARG)	59.14A	Raúl Folmer (ARG)	53.72A	Marcelo Bordin (BRA)	42.00A
Javelin throw	Orion Bittencourt (BRA)	50.40A	Martín Bossio (ARG)	48.72A	Ricardo Valiente (PER)	44.06A
Hexathlon	Orion Bittencourt (BRA)	3713A	Gabriel Quintás (ARG)	3392A	Ricardo Valiente (PER)	3366A
4 × 100 metres relay	Peru; Eduardo Núñez; Javier Narduce; Claudio Galdos; Miguel Huamán	44.1A	Argentina; Alejandro Ordinas; Fernando Oliva; Leonardo Tellado; Marcelo Ducart	45.4A	Paraguay; Juan Wasmosy; Humberto Sarubbi; Eduardo Lloret; Pablo Papalardo	45.5A
4 × 400 metres relay	Brazil	3:31.7A	Peru	3:38.2A	Argentina	3:39.1A

=== Women ===
Event	Gold		Silver		Bronze	
100 metres	Nancy Chemini (ARG)	12.6A	Rosana Viasco (URU)	12.7A	Rita Gomes (BRA)	12.9A
200 metres	Jupira da Graça (BRA)	25.7A	Virginia Guerra (URU)	26.5A	Rita Gomes (BRA)	26.5A
400 metres	Jupira da Graça (BRA)	57.1A	Ana Verissimo (BRA)	57.8A	Susana Quintana (PER)	60.0A
800 metres	Ana Verissimo (BRA)	2:19.8A	Luiza do Nascimento (BRA)	2:20.3A	Niusha Mansilla (BOL)	2:24.8A
1500 metres	Martha Palomino (PER)	4:55.1A	Luiza do Nascimento (BRA)	4:56.6A	Roxana Coronatti (ARG)	4:59.1A
100 metres hurdles	Clarice Kuhn (BRA)	15.2A	Roberta Fernandes (BRA)	15.3A	Virginia Arriola (PAR)	15.5A
High jump	Clarice Kuhn (BRA)	1.63A	Elena Junges (ARG)	1.63A	Ursula Karl (PER)	1.55A
Long jump	Mónica Falcioni (URU)	5.54A	Roberta Fernandes (BRA)	5.32A	Maritza Macogno (ARG)	5.27A
Shot put	Ana Viglione (ARG)	10.84A	Elvira Yufra (PER)	10.24A	María Grimaldi (ARG)	10.17A
Discus throw	Cristiane Meher (BRA)	37.26A	Elvira Yufra (PER)	34.00A	María Gamboa (ARG)	31.86A
Javelin throw	María Gamboa (ARG)	35.64A	Zorobabelia Córdoba (COL)	34.36A	Alexandra Dumas (BRA)	28.86A
Pentathlon	Alexandra Dumas (BRA)	3086A	Ana Keutman (BRA)	2985A	Adriana Giménez (ARG)	2959A
4 × 100 metres relay	Brazil; Clarice Kuhn; Jupira da Graça; Roberta Fernandes; Rita Gomes	49.9A	Argentina; Graciela Guglielmo; Andrea Ávila; Carolina Schlossberg; Nancy Chemini	50.9A	Peru; Malú Croussilat; M. Bonilla; Liliana Pereira; Susana Quintana	51.7A
4 × 400 metres relay	Brazil	4:03.3A	Argentina	4:15.3A	Peru	4:20.5A

== Medal table (unofficial) ==
* Host nation (Bolivia)

Rank	Nation	Gold	Silver	Bronze	Total
1	Brazil (BRA)	22	12	7	41
2	Argentina (ARG)	8	13	8	29
3	Peru (PER)	2	6	11	19
4	Uruguay (URU)	1	2	0	3
5	Paraguay (PAR)	1	0	3	4
6	Colombia (COL)	0	1	1	2
7	Bolivia (BOL)*	0	0	3	3
Totals (7 entries)		34	34	33	101

== Participation (unofficial) ==
Detailed result lists can be found on the "World Junior Athletics History" website. An unofficial count yields the number of about 136 athletes from about 7 countries:

- Argentina (39)
- Bolivia (22)
- Brazil (28)
- Colombia (5)
- Paraguay (18)
- (Peru) Perú (21)
- Uruguay (3)
