= Valeria Martínez =

Mexican footballer (born 2005)

Personal information
- Full name: Valeria Martínez Aguirre
- Date of birth: 23 September 2005 (age 21)
- Place of birth: Aguascalientes City, Aguascalientes, Mexico
- Height: 1.66 m (5 ft 5 in)
- Position: Goalkeeper

Team information
- Current team: Toluca
- Number: 12

Senior career*
Years	Team	Apps	(Gls)
2021–2025	Necaxa	84	(0)
2025–	Toluca	16	(0)

International career^{‡}
2023–2024	Mexico U-20		
- * Club domestic league appearances and goals as of 31 January 2026 ‡ National team caps and goals as of 12 March 2022

Valeria Martínez Aguirre (born 23 September 2005) is a Mexican professional footballer who plays as a goalkeeper for Liga MX Femenil side Toluca.

== Career ==
In 2021, she started her career in Necaxa.

== International career ==
Since 2023, Martínez has been part of the Mexico U-20 team.
