= 1988 South American Junior Championships in Athletics =

XX South American Junior Championships in Athletics
- Dates: June 30-July 3
- Host city: Cubatão, Brazil
- Level: Junior
- Events: 41
- Participation: about 254 athletes from 10 nations

The 20th South American Junior Championships in Athletics were held in Cubatão, Brazil from June 30-July 3, 1988.

== Participation (unofficial) ==
Detailed result lists can be found on the "World Junior Athletics History" website. An unofficial count yields the number of about 254 athletes from about 10 countries: Argentina (49), Bolivia (7), Brazil (62), Chile (24), Colombia (4), Ecuador (21), Paraguay (31), Peru (19), Uruguay (22), Venezuela (15).

== Medal summary ==
Medal winners are published for men and women Complete results can be found on the "World Junior Athletics History" website.

=== Men ===
Event	Gold		Silver		Bronze	
100 metres	Fernando Botasso (BRA)	10.4	Gabriel Somma (ARG)	10.5	Oscar Fernández (PER)	10.5
200 metres	Claudio Arcas (ARG)	21.96	Gabriel Somma (ARG)	22.05	Geraldo Maranhão (BRA)	22.06
400 metres	Inaldo Sena (BRA)	47.40	Aurelio Mancheno (ECU)	47.70	Gilmar Santos (BRA)	47.99
800 metres	Edgardo Graglia (ARG)	1:51.63	Ricardo Siqueira (BRA)	1:51.64	Ricardo Beltrán (ARG)	1:53.15
1500 metres	Wander Moura (BRA)	3:51.8	José Valente (BRA)	3:53.9	Reinaldo Camacho (PER)	3:55.2
5000 metres	Valdenor dos Santos (BRA)	14:27.9	Franklin Tenorio (ECU)	14:35.9	Ricardo Soria (ARG)	14:52.7
10,000 metres	Valdenor dos Santos (BRA)	31:34.6	Franklin Tenorio (ECU)	32:02.7	Héctor Aimar (ARG)	32:08.1
110 metres hurdles	Eliexer Pulgar (VEN)	14.88	Robson Feliciano (BRA)	15.09	Marco Mina (PER)	15.23
400 metres hurdles	Paulo Rodrigues (BRA)	52.0	Esdras Paredes (VEN)	52.7	Fábio Aleixo (BRA)	54.6
2000 metres steeplechase	Wander Moura (BRA)	5:34.9	Sérgio Ribeiro (BRA)	5:42.2	Leonardo Malgor (ARG)	5:44.2
4 × 100 metres relay	Argentina; Néstor Soncini; Gabriel Somma; Guillermo Cacián; Claudio Arcas	41.20	Brazil; Anísio Silva; Carlos Agra; Nunes; Geraldo Maranhão Jr.	41.48	Chile; Javier Widoycovich; Carlos Ward; Sergio Ossandon; Hernán Hevia	42.19
4 × 400 metres relay	Brazil; Inaldo de Sena; Gilmar da Silva; Adilson da Silva; Eronilde de Araújo	3:12.94	Argentina; Claudio Arcas; Guillermo Cacián; Nicolás Rodríguez; Ricardo Espinosa	3:13.97	Chile; Hernán Hevia; José Seguel; Ricardo Quesada; Carlos Ward	3:23.91
10,000 metres track walk	Juan Rojas (ECU)	41:41.4	Sérgio Galdino (BRA)	NTT	Ademar Kammler (BRA)	NTT
High jump	Alcides Silva (BRA)	2.09	Felipe Álvarez (VEN)	2.03	Jairo Venâncio (BRA)	2.03
Pole vault	Rodrigo Casacurta (BRA)	4.50	Cristián Aspillaga (CHI)	4.30	Igor Castillo (PER)	4.20
Long jump	Paulo de Oliveira (BRA)	7.05	Anísio Silva (BRA)	6.99	Diego Vázquez (ARG)	6.89
Triple jump	Anísio Silva (BRA)	15.94	Winston Ascanio (VEN)	15.25	Laerte Amador (BRA)	14.79
Shot put	Valmir Campos (BRA)	15.55	Ramón Jiménez (PAR)	15.40	Paulo do Nascimento (BRA)	15.25
Discus throw	Ramón Jiménez (PAR)	51.08	Acassio da Silva (BRA)	45.16	Paulo do Nascimento (BRA)	44.30
Hammer throw	Alexandre Mantovani (BRA)	55.62	Omar Rubino (ARG)	54.02	Claudio Henschke (ARG)	49.82
Javelin throw	Sylvio de Oliveira (BRA)	60.28	Augusto Ingolotti (PAR)	59.10	José Rodríguez (VEN)	57.54
Decathlon	Juan Carlos Moeckel (CHI)	6470	Ivan Costa (BRA)	6383	Martín Tellado (ARG)	6143

=== Women ===
Event	Gold		Silver		Bronze	
100 metres	Ana Maria Rocha (BRA)	12.00	Soledad Bacarezza (CHI)	12.05	Rita Gomes (BRA)	12.16
200 metres	Jupira da Graça (BRA)	24.34	Ximena Restrepo (COL)	24.38	Soledad Bacarezza (CHI)	24.71
400 metres	Luciana Mendes (BRA)	55.49	Claudia Riquelme (CHI)	55.75	Milagros Allende (ARG)	56.38
800 metres	Célia dos Santos (BRA)	2:08.76	Mabel Arrúa (ARG)	2:12.09	Pilar Ramos (CHI)	2:12.41
1500 metres	Célia dos Santos (BRA)	4:28.4	Lidia Karwowski (BRA)	4:29.6	Marlene Arellano (CHI)	4:35.3
3000 metres	Lidia Karwowski (BRA)	9:41.7	Alina Karwowski (BRA)	9:47.8	Rosa Mila Ibarra (COL)	9:53.2
10,000 metres	Sandra Ruales (ECU)	36:48.9	Soledad Nieto (ECU)	37:53.7	Solange Cordeiro (BRA)	39:04.8
100 metres hurdles	Clarice Kuhn (BRA)	14.28	Adriana Davin (BRA)	14.57	Carolina Gutiérrez (ARG)	14.61
400 metres hurdles	Sidnéia Franco (BRA)	61.18	Cláudia Silva (BRA)	61.63	Claudia Riquelme (CHI)	62.36
4 × 100 metres relay	Brazil; Clarice Kuhn; Rita Gomes; Francisca da Silva; Jupira da Graça	45.82	Argentina; Milagros Allende; Virginia Lebreo; Soledad Serra; María Carrara	47.28	Chile; Soledad Bacarezza; Claudia Riquelme; Claudia Herrera; Claudia Young	47.69
4 × 400 metres relay	Brazil; Ana Verissimo; Luciana Mendes; Célia dos Santos; Jupira da Graça	3:41.52	Chile; Soledad Bacarezza; Claudia Riquelme; Claudia Herrera; Pilar Ramos	3:48.57	Argentina; Milagros Allende; Paola Gianna; Alejandra Cutica; Mabel Arrua	3:49.25
5000 metres track walk	Miriam Ramón (ECU)	27:12.8	Ivana Henn (BRA)	28:23.6	Luisa Nivicela (ECU)	28:46.5
High jump	Claudia Blotto (ARG)	1.70	Ana Lúcia Silva (BRA)	1.70	Vera Decker (BRA)	1.70
Long jump	Ana Martina Vizioli (ARG)	5.87	Audrey González (VEN)	5.69	Carolina Gutiérrez (ARG)	5.60
Shot put	Lila Morales (VEN)	13.90	Berta Gómez (COL)	13.70	Elisângela Adriano (BRA)	13.04
Discus throw	Berta Gómez (COL)	42.58	Alexandra Amaro (BRA)	42.42	Adriana Romero (ARG)	40.26
Javelin throw	Berta Gómez (COL)	50.38	Alexandra Dumas (BRA)	47.18	Claudia Silva (CHI)	44.70
Heptathlon	Carolina Gutiérrez (ARG)	4843	Ana Lúcia Silva (BRA)	4667	Vera Alves (BRA)	4621

== Medal table (unofficial) ==
* Host nation (Brazil)

Rank	Nation	Gold	Silver	Bronze	Total
1	Brazil (BRA)*	25	18	13	56
2	Argentina (ARG)	6	6	12	24
3	Ecuador (ECU)	3	4	1	8
4	Venezuela (VEN)	2	4	1	7
5	Colombia (COL)	2	2	1	5
6	Chile (CHI)	1	4	8	13
7	Paraguay (PAR)	1	2	0	3
8	Peru (PER)	0	0	4	4
Totals (8 entries)		40	40	40	120
