= Inaldo Sena =

Brazilian sprinter (born 1971)

Personal information
- Born: 18 June 1971 (age 55) Rio de Janeiro, Brazil

Sport
- Sport: Track and field
Medal record
Representing Brazil
South American Championships
Silver medal – second place	1993 Lima	400 m
Silver medal – second place	1995 Manaus	400 m
IAAF World Cup
Bronze medal – third place	1994 London	400 m

Inaldo Justino de Sena (born 18 June 1971) is a Brazilian former male track and field sprinter who specialised in the 400 metres. He represented his country at the World Championships in Athletics in 1995 and took a bronze medal at the 1994 IAAF World Cup. He won two gold and four silver medals at the Ibero-American Championships in Athletics during his career.

Regionally, he was a three-time South American junior champion and went on to win two individual silver medals at the senior South American Championships in Athletics. He was a three-time Brazilian sprint champion. His personal best of 45.02 seconds was set in 1994.

== Career ==
Sena had a highly successful junior career, starting with a 400 m gold at the 1986 South American Youth Championships in Athletics. He was the silver medallist at the 1987 South American Junior Championships in Athletics then won three straight 400 m gold medals at the competition from 1988 to 1990. He was also a double silver medallist at the Pan American Junior Championships in 1989, taking individual and relay medals.

Sena won his first senior medals at the age of nineteen at the 1990 Ibero-American Championships in Athletics. On home soil in Manaus, he won the 400 m final in 46.54 seconds before teaming up with Eronilde de Araújo to win the 4 × 400 metres relay. It was the first time Brazil had won either of those titles at the competition. He subsequently rose to become one of Brazil's best sprinters of the era, taking three national titles in the 400 m at the Brazilian Athletics Championships from 1992 to 1995. He ran at the 1991 IAAF World Indoor Championships, making it to the semi-finals.

An attempted defence of his titles at the 1992 Ibero-American Championships in Athletics resulted in silver medals: he was beaten in the individual event by compatriot Sidnei Telles de Souza and by a strong Cuban team in the relay. Further silver medals in the 400 m came at the South American Championships in Athletics, in both 1993 (behind Wilson Cañizales) and 1995 (behind Sanderlei Parrela). He won the first and only global medal of his career in this period, taking bronze for the Americas team at the 1994 IAAF World Cup, and also coming fifth in the relay. He recorded his lifetime best run of 45.02 seconds that same year in Madrid. He made his major championship debut at the 1995 World Championships in Athletics but was eliminated in the quarter-finals.

Despite his increasing success, his international career came to an end at the age of twenty-four. His last medals came at the 1996 Ibero-American Championships in Athletics, where he repeated as double silver medallist for Brazil. His teammate Sanderlei Parrela was the 400 m winner.

After retiring from active competition, he went into coaching. He received a four-year ban from the sport of athletics in 2010 due to his involvement in doping his athletes.

== International competitions ==
Year	Competition	Venue	Position	Event	Notes
1986	South American Youth Championships	Comodoro Rivadavia, Argentina	1st	400 m	50.63
1987	South American Junior Championships	Santiago, Chile	2nd	400 m	48.26
1988	South American Junior Championships	Cubatão, Brazil	1st	400 m	47.40
1988	World Junior Championships	Sudbury, Canada	7th (heats)	400 m	48.30
1989	South American Junior Championships	Montevideo, Uruguay	1st	400 m	47.53
1989	Pan American Junior Championships	Santa Fe, Argentina	2nd	400 m	47.14
1989	Pan American Junior Championships	Santa Fe, Argentina	2nd	4 × 400 m relay	3:13.22
1990	South American Junior Championships	Bogotá, Colombia	1st	400 m	46.89
1990	Ibero-American Championships	Manaus, Brazil	1st	400 m	46.54
1990	Ibero-American Championships	Manaus, Brazil	1st	4 × 400 m relay	3:09.2
1990	World Junior Championships	Plovdiv, Bulgaria	7th (semis)	400 m	47.09
1991	World Indoor Championships	Seville, Spain	4th (heats)	400 m	49.49
1992	Ibero-American Championships	Seville, Spain	2nd	400 m	46.14
1992	Ibero-American Championships	Seville, Spain	2nd	4 × 400 m relay	3:03.50
1993	South American Championships	Lima, Peru	2nd	400 m	47.50
1993	South American Championships	Lima, Peru	1st	4 × 400 m relay	3:09.0
1994	IAAF World Cup	London, United Kingdom	3rd	400 m	45.44
1994	IAAF World Cup	London, United Kingdom	5th	4 × 400 m relay	3:04.28
1995	South American Championships	Manaus, Brazil	2nd	400 m	45.88
1995	South American Championships	Manaus, Brazil	1st	4 × 400 m relay	3:04.93
1995	World Championships	Gothenburg, Sweden	5th (q-finals)	400 m	45.71
1996	Ibero-American Championships	Medellín, Colombia	2nd	400 m	45.88
1996	Ibero-American Championships	Medellín, Colombia	2nd	4 × 400 m relay	3:04.28
1997	South American Championships	Mar del Plata, Argentina	4th	400 m	47.57
1997	South American Championships	Mar del Plata, Argentina	1st	4 × 400 m relay	3:04.20

== National titles ==
- Brazilian Athletics Championships
  - 400 metres: 1992, 1994, 1995
