= 1996 Ibero-American Championships in Athletics =

VII Ibero-American Championships
- Official logo
- Dates: 9 – 12 May
- Host city: Medellín, Colombia
- Venue: Estadio Alfonso Galvis Duque
- Events: 42
- Participation: 339 athletes from 19 nations
- Records set: 11 championship records

The 1996 Ibero-American Championships in Athletics (Spanish: VII Campeonato Iberoamericano de Atletismo) was the seventh edition of the international athletics competition between Ibero-American nations which was held at the Estadio Alfonso Galvis Duque in Medellín, Colombia from 9–12 May.

The competition was held at an altitude of 1480 metres above sea level, which served to raise performances in most athletic events, bar the long-distance running contests. Eleven championships records were improved during the three-day competition which comprised 42 events; there were 22 men's events and 20 women's events (with equal programmes bar the men's steeplechase and pole vault). Two national records were broken at the event: Costa Rica's Alex Foster beat the 110 metres hurdles record, while decathlon runner-up Alejandro Cárdenas set a Mexican record of 7614 points.

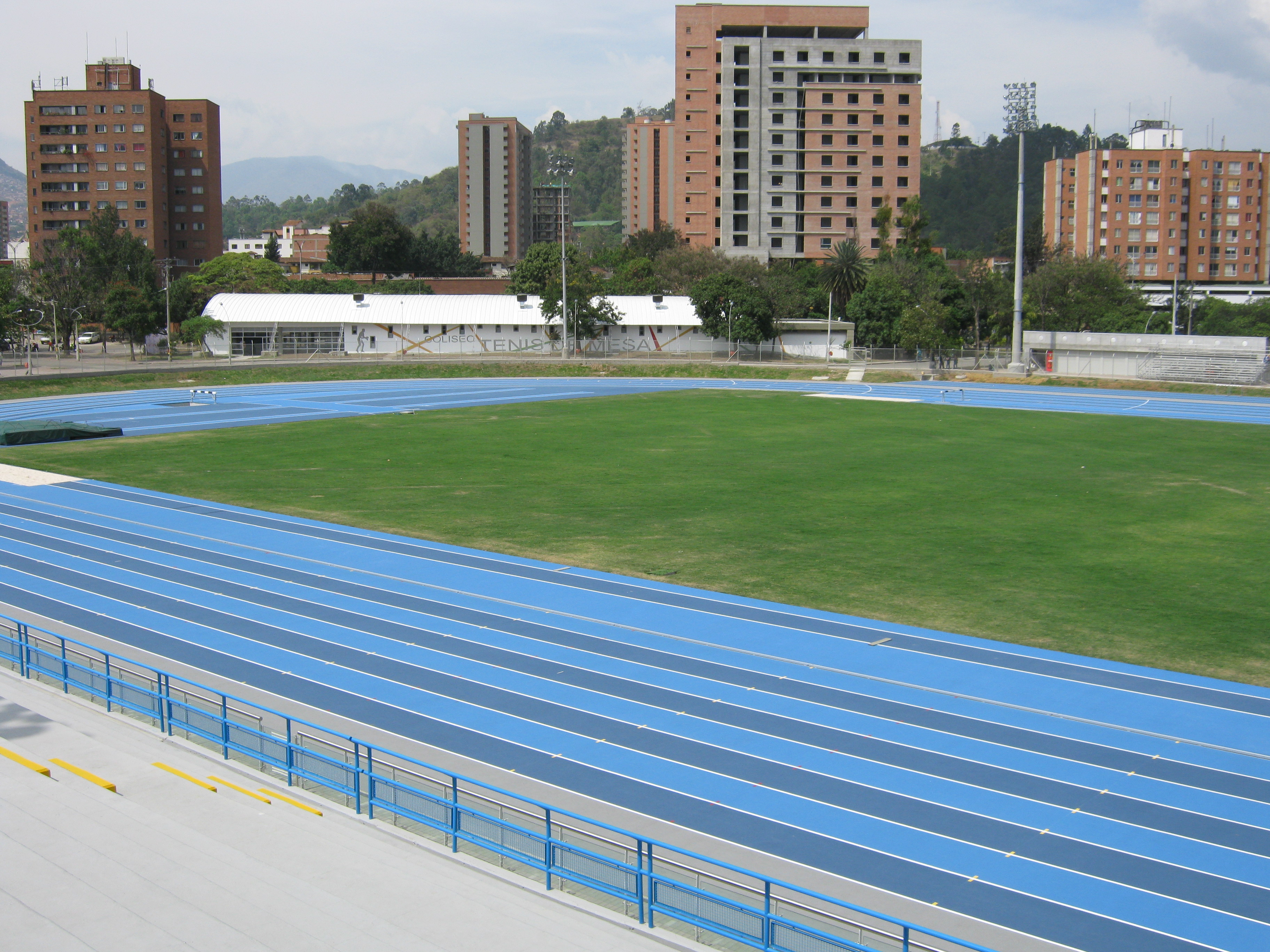
The host stadium shown in 2010.

Cuba sent a full strength delegation and won almost half the events, taking twenty golds and 41 medals overall. Cuban gold medallists included high jumper Javier Sotomayor, 800 metres runners Ana Fidelia Quirot and Norberto Téllez, and hurdler Anier García. Boosted by the absence of Spain, Brazil came second in the medal tally, winning 31 medals in total – eight of which were gold. The hosts Colombia performed well in the long-distance events and women's sprints and ended the competition third overall with six golds in their haul of twenty medals.

Chile's Sebastián Keitel was one of the foremost athletes at the event as he claimed a 100/200 metres double against Brazilian and Cuban opposition. His compatriot Gert Weil won the fifth Ibero-American gold medal in the shot put. María Eugenia Villamizar of Colombia won her second straight hammer throw title in a championship record. Her team mate Felipa Palacios broke the women's 200 m record with her winning time of 22.93 seconds.

The other record breakers were principally Cuban: Yamilé Aldama improved the triple jump mark, Alberto Manzano set a new pole vault standard, while throwers Alberto Sánchez and Isbel Luaces beat the previous records in the hammer and javelin throw, respectively. The closest contest of the competition was the women's 400 metres as Julia Duporty edged Ximena Restrepo by three hundredths of a second. Restrepo later took the Colombian women to the gold in the 4×400 metres relay, while Duporty's Cuban team were disqualified.

== Medal summary ==
=== Men ===
Event	Gold		Silver		Bronze	
100 metres	Sebastián Keitel (CHI)	10.13	Arnaldo da Silva (BRA)	10.17	Marcelo Brivilatti (BRA)	10.37
200 metres (Wind: −2.7 m/s)	Sebastián Keitel (CHI)	20.53	Marcelo Brivilatti (BRA)	20.71	Misael Ortíz (CUB)	21.15
400 metres	Sanderlei Parrela (BRA)	45.57	Inaldo Sena (BRA)	45.88	Jorge Crusellas (CUB)	46.25
800 metres	Norberto Téllez (CUB)	1:45.83 CR	Flavio Godoy (BRA)	1:47.11	Mark Olivo (VEN)	1:47.67
1500 metres	Edgar de Oliveira (BRA)	3:43.00	José Valente (BRA)	3:43.81	Gilberto Merchant (MEX)	3:44.11
5000 metres	William Roldán (COL)	14:16.20	Herder Vásquez (COL)	14:18.88	Gerardo Morales (MEX)	14:19.87
10,000 metres	Herder Vásquez (COL)	30:08.35	Jacinto López (COL)	30:09.76	Gerardo Morales (MEX)	30:13.28
110 metres hurdles	Anier García (CUB)	13.39 CR	Pedro Chiamulera (BRA)	13.58	Alexis Sánchez (CUB)	13.89
400 metres hurdles	Alexis Sánchez (CUB)	49.22	Carlos Silva (POR)	49.33	Domingo Cordero (PUR)	49.64
3000 metres steeplechase	Clodoaldo do Carmo (BRA)	8:47.18	Héctor Arias (MEX)	8:54.64	Eduardo do Nascimento (BRA)	8:57.46
4×100 metres relay	Mexico (MEX); Carlos Villaseñor; Alejandro Cárdenas; Raymundo Escalante; Miguel Miranda	39.60	Puerto Rico (PUR); Carlos Santos; Agner Muñoz; Rosendo Rivera; Domingo Cordero	39.93	Argentina (ARG); Jorge Polanco; Guillermo Cacián; Ceferino Mondino; Carlos Gats	40.33
4×400 metres relay	Cuba (CUB); Omar Meña; Jorge Crusellas; Georkis Vera; Norberto Téllez	3:03.98	Brazil (BRA); Valdinei da Silva; Sanderlei Parrela; Osmar dos Santos; Inaldo Sena	3:04.28	Colombia (COL); Julio César Rojas; Llimi Rivas; Wenceslao Ferrín; Wilson Cañizales	3:07.13
20 km track walk	Jorge Segura (MEX)	1:25:25.21	Germán Sánchez (MEX)	1:26:30	Héctor Moreno (COL)	1:26:54
High jump	Javier Sotomayor (CUB)	2.30 m	Gilmar Mayo (COL)	2.23 m	Marcos dos Santos (BRA) Julio Luciano (DOM)	2.10 m
Pole vault	Alberto Manzano (CUB)	5.55 m CR	Edgar Díaz (PUR)	5.50 m	Miguel Saldarriaga (COL)	5.00 m
Long jump	Nelson Ferreira (BRA)	8.41 m (w)	Jaime Jefferson (CUB)	8.28 m (w)	Carlos Calado (POR)	8.06 m
Triple jump	Messias José Baptista (BRA)	16.99 m CR	Carlos Calado (POR)	16.82 m	Osiris Mora (CUB)	16.45 m
Shot put	Gert Weil (CHI)	19.67 m	Yojer Medina (VEN)	18.10 m	Édson Miguel (BRA)	17.21 m
Discus throw	Frank Bicet (CUB)	58.12 m	João dos Santos (BRA)	55.32 m	Marcelo Pugliese (ARG)	54.32 m
Hammer throw	Alberto Sánchez (CUB)	73.62 m CR	Yosvany Suárez (CUB)	70.54 m	Vítor Costa (POR)	69.84 m
Javelin throw	Isbel Luaces (CUB)	78.74 m CR	Rodrigo Zelaya (CHI)	74.22 m	Edgar Baumann (PAR)	73.94 m
Decathlon	Yonelvis Águila (CUB)	7705 pts	Alejandro Cárdenas (MEX)	7614 pts	William Gallardo (CUB)	7544 pts

=== Women ===
Event	Gold		Silver		Bronze	
100 metres	Cleide Amaral (BRA)	11.48	Zandra Borrero (COL)	11.50	Idalia Hechevarría (CUB)	11.54
200 metres	Felipa Palacios (COL)	22.93 CR	Idalmis Bonne (CUB)	23.07	Surella Morales (CUB)	23.11
400 metres	Julia Duporty (CUB)	50.84	Ximena Restrepo (COL)	50.87	Maria Figueirêdo (BRA)	51.36
800 metres	Ana Fidelia Quirot (CUB)	2:02.50	Mairelín Fuentes (CUB)	2:04.77	Marta Orellana (ARG)	2:04.81
1500 metres	Marta Orellana (ARG)	4:20.99	Yesenia Centeno (CUB)	4:22.30	Célia dos Santos (BRA)	4:25.98
5000 metres	Erika Olivera (CHI)	16:26.13 CR	Stella Castro (COL)	16:35.34	Iglandini González (COL)	16:37.97
10,000 metres	Stella Castro (COL)	34:27.74	Santa Velázquez (MEX)	34:29.95	Erika Olivera (CHI)	34:41.75
100 metres hurdles (Wind: +3.0 m/s)	Joyce Meléndez (PUR)	13.41	Damaris Anderson (CUB)	13.54	Katia Brito (CUB)	13.57
400 metres hurdles	Lency Montelier (CUB)	57.84	Odalys Hernández (CUB)	57.96	Flor Robledo (COL)	58.19
4×100 metres relay	Cuba (CUB); Idalia Hechevarría; Damaris Anderson; Dainelky Pérez; Liliana Allen	44.11 CR	Colombia (COL); Mirtha Brock; Felipa Palacios; Patricia Rodríguez; Sandra Borrero	44.17	Brazil (BRA); Cleide Amaral; Maria Figueiredo; Lucimar de Moura; Kátia de Jesus Santos	44.59
4×400 metres relay	Colombia (COL); Patricia Rodríguez; Norfalia Carabalí; Flor Robledo; Ximena Restrepo	3:33.69	Brazil (BRA); Maria Figueiredo; Fátima dos Santos; Marlene da Silva; Luciana de Paula Mendes	3:34.34	Mexico (MEX); Ana Guevara; Alejandra Quintanar; Claudia Moctezuma; Mayra González	3:38.48
10 km track walk	Gianetti Bonfim (BRA)	48:15.67	Abigail Sáenz (MEX)	48:38.04	Geovana Irusta (BOL)	48:56.22
High jump	Orlane dos Santos (BRA)	1.86 m	Niurka Lussón (CUB)	1.83 m	Juana Arrendel (DOM) Alejandra García (ARG)	1.83 m
Long jump	Lissete Cuza (CUB)	6.57 m	Maurren Maggi (BRA)	6.26 m	Luciana dos Santos (BRA)	6.24 m
Triple jump	Yamilé Aldama (CUB)	14.39 m CR	Magdelín Martínez (CUB)	14.17 m (w)	Maria de Souza (BRA)	13.49 m (w)
Shot put	Herminia Fernández (CUB)	18.05 m	Elisângela Adriano (BRA)	17.90 m	Alexandra Amaro (BRA)	15.60 m
Discus throw	Olga Gómez (CUB)	58.48 m	Elisângela Adriano (BRA)	57.10 m	Marlén Sánchez (CUB)	55.50 m
Hammer throw	María Eugenia Villamizar (COL)	57.76 m CR	Norbi Balantén (CUB)	53.80 m	Amarilis Mesa (CUB)	52.50 m
Javelin throw (Old javelin model)	Sonia Bisset (CUB)	64.54 m	Odelmys Palma (CUB)	63.32 m	Zuleima Araméndiz (COL)	56.24 m
Heptathlon	Osiris Pedroso (CUB)	5715 pts (w)	Euzinete dos Reis (BRA)	5495 pts	Zorobabelia Córdoba (COL)	5165 pts

== Medal table ==
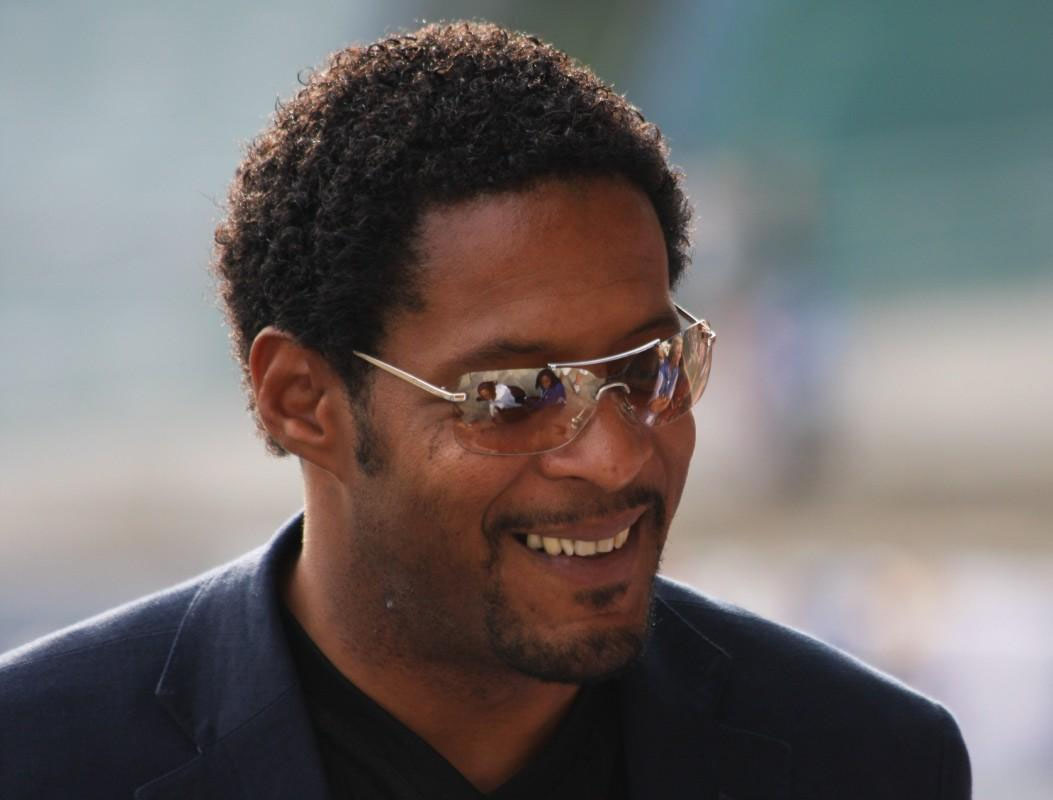
High jump world record holder Javier Sotomayor won one of twenty golds for Cuba.

* Host nation (Colombia)

Rank	Nation	Gold	Silver	Bronze	Total
1	Cuba (CUB)	20	11	10	41
2	Brazil (BRA)	8	13	10	31
3	Colombia (COL)*	6	7	7	20
4	Chile (CHI)	4	1	1	6
5	Mexico (MEX)	2	5	4	11
6	Puerto Rico (PUR)	1	2	1	4
7	Argentina (ARG)	1	0	4	5
8	Portugal (POR)	0	2	2	4
9	Venezuela (VEN)	0	1	1	2
10	Dominican Republic (DOM)	0	0	2	2
11	Bolivia (BOL)	0	0	1	1
11	Paraguay (PAR)	0	0	1	1
Totals (12 entries)		42	42	44	128

- ^{†}Note: The medal count from the 2010 Ibero-American Championships report is incorrect as it did not include the shared high jump bronze medals of the Dominican Republic's Juana Arrendel and Marcos dos Santos of Brazil.

== Participation ==
Out of the 23 members of the Asociación Iberoamericana de Atletismo at that point in time, 19 nations sent delegations to the championships. The most notable absences were Spain and Uruguay. Despite the fact that the competition was held in the Americas, Nicaragua and Honduras did not send teams.

- Angola (1)
- Argentina (22)
- Bolivia (5)
- Brazil (60)
- Chile (10)
- Colombia (56)
- Costa Rica (9)
- Cuba (65)
- Dominican Republic (9)
- Ecuador (2)
- Guatemala (9)
- Mexico (37)
- Panama (2)
- Paraguay (1)
- Peru (7)
- Portugal (10)
- Puerto Rico (25)
- El Salvador (1)
- Venezuela (8)
