= Clodoaldo do Carmo =

Brazilian athlete (born 1968)

Clodoaldo Lopes do Carmo (27 April 1968 in São Paulo) is a retired Brazilian athlete who specialised in the 3000 metres steeplechase. He represented his country at two Olympic Games, in 1992 and 1996, making it to the final on the first occasion.

He has later worked as a coach, among others of Solonei da Silva and Kléberson Davide.

== Competition record ==
Year	Competition	Venue	Position	Event	Notes
Representing Brazil
1984	South American Youth Championships	Tarija, Bolivia	1st	1500 m	4:10.0
1984	South American Youth Championships	Tarija, Bolivia	1st	3000 m	9:00.1
1984	South American Youth Championships	Tarija, Bolivia	1st	1500 m s'chase	4:25.2
1984	South American Junior Championships	Caracas, Venezuela	2nd	5000 m	14:59.44
1984	South American Junior Championships	Caracas, Venezuela	5th	2000 m s'chase	6:13.26
1986	Pan American Junior Championships	Winter Park, United States	6th	2000 m s'chase	5:49.78
1986	World Junior Championships	Athens, Greece	15th	1500m	3:56.10
1986	World Junior Championships	Athens, Greece	16th (h)	2000m steeplechase	5:47.62
1986	South American Junior Championships	Quito, Ecuador	2nd	800 m	1:54.57
1986	South American Junior Championships	Quito, Ecuador	3rd	1500 m	4:11.4
1987	South American Junior Championships	Santiago, Chile	1st	1500 m	3:57.45
1987	South American Junior Championships	Santiago, Chile	1st	5000 m	14:25.17
1989	South American Championships	Medellín, Colombia	9th	1500 m	3:57.5
1990	Ibero-American Championships	Manaus, Brazil	5th	3000 m s'chase	8:49.38
1992	Ibero-American Championships	Seville, Spain	1st	3000 m s'chase	8:38.55
1992	Olympic Games	Barcelona, Spain	11th	3000 m s'chase	8:25.92
1992	World Cup	Havana, Cuba	–	3000 m s'chase	DNF
1995	South American Championships	Manaus, Brazil	1st	3000 m s'chase	8:56.87
1996	Ibero-American Championships	Medellín, Colombia	1st	3000 m s'chase	8:47.18
1996	Olympic Games	Atlanta, United States	33rd (h)	3000 m s'chase	8:51.78

== Personal bests ==
- 1500 metres – 3:56.10 (Athens 1986)
- 3000 metres – 7:45.34 (Koblenz 1992)
- 3000 metres steeplechase – 8:19.80 (Brussels 1992)
