= Paulo de Oliveira =

Brazilian athlete (born 1969)

Personal information
- Full name: Paulo Sérgio de Oliveira
- Born: 9 May 1969 (age 56)

Sport
- Sport: Athletics
- Event: Long jump

Paulo Sérgio de Oliveira (born 9 May 1969) is a retired Brazilian athlete who specialised in the long jump. He won three gold medals at the South American Championships, in 1987, 1991 and 1993. In addition, he represented his country at the 1991 World Championships without qualifying for the final.

His personal best in the event is 7.91 metres (-0.5 m/s, Rio de Janeiro 1993).

== International competitions ==
Year	Competition	Venue	Position	Event	Notes
Representing Brazil
1984	South American Youth Championships	Tarija, Bolivia	1st	Long jump	6.66 m
1984	South American Youth Championships	Tarija, Bolivia	4th	Hexathlon	3360 pts
1985	South American Junior Championships	Santa Fe, Argentina	3rd	Long jump	7.25 m
1986	Pan American Junior Championships	Winter Park, United States	5th	Long jump	7.40 m
1986	World Junior Championships	Athens, Greece	17th (q)	Long jump	7.25 m
1987	South American Junior Championships	Santiago, Chile	1st	Long jump	7.14 m
1987	South American Championships	São Paulo, Brazil	1st	Long jump	7.65 m
1988	South American Junior Championships	Cubatão, Brazil	1st	Long jump	7.05 m
1988	World Junior Championships	Sudbury, Canada	29th (q)	Long jump	6.71 m
1988	World Junior Championships	Sudbury, Canada	14th (q)	Triple jump	15.55 m (w)
1990	Ibero-American Championships	Manaus, Brazil	1st	Long jump	7.82 m (w)
1991	South American Championships	Manaus, Brazil	1st	Long jump	7.83 m
1991	Pan American Games	Havana, Cuba	7th	Long jump	7.47 m
1991	World Championships	Tokyo, Japan	23rd (q)	Long jump	7.78 m
1993	South American Championships	Lima, Peru	1st	Long jump	7.99 m (w)
1994	Ibero-American Championships	Mar del Plata, Argentina	2nd	Long jump	7.77 m
