= Marcelo Barrientos =

Chilean long-distance runner

Personal information
- Full name: Marcelo Barrientos Cárdenas
- Nationality: Chilean
- Born: 9 May 1970 (age 55)
- Height: 1.73 m (5 ft 8 in)
- Weight: 60 kg (132 lb)

Sport
- Sport: Long-distance running
- Event: Marathon

Marcelo Barrientos Cárdenas (born 9 May 1970) is a Chilean long-distance runner. He competed in the men's marathon at the 1996 Summer Olympics.
