= Natalia Toledo (athlete) =

Paraguayan long jumper

Personal information
- Nationality: Paraguayan
- Born: 15 May 1972 (age 54)

Sport
- Sport: Athletics
- Event: Long jump

Natalia Toledo (born 15 May 1972) is a Paraguayan athlete. She competed in the women's long jump at the 1992 Summer Olympics.
