= Maria de Souza =

Brazilian triple jumper

Personal information
- Born: 5 September 1971 (age 55) São José dos Quatro Marcos, Brazil
- Height: 1.68 m (5 ft 6 in)
- Weight: 59 kg (130 lb)

Sport
- Sport: Athletics
- Event: Triple jump
- Club: Reebok/Funilense Cosmópolis

Maria Aparecida Barbosa de Souza (born 5 September 1971) is a Brazilian athlete. She competed in the women's triple jump at the 1996 Summer Olympics.

Her personal best is 13.94 metres set in Americana in 1997.
