= 1992 Ibero-American Championships in Athletics =

V Ibero-American Championships
- Dates: 17 – 19 July
- Host city: Seville, Spain
- Venue: Estadio Olímpico de La Cartuja
- Events: 41
- Participation: 462 athletes from 22 nations
- Records set: 14 championship records

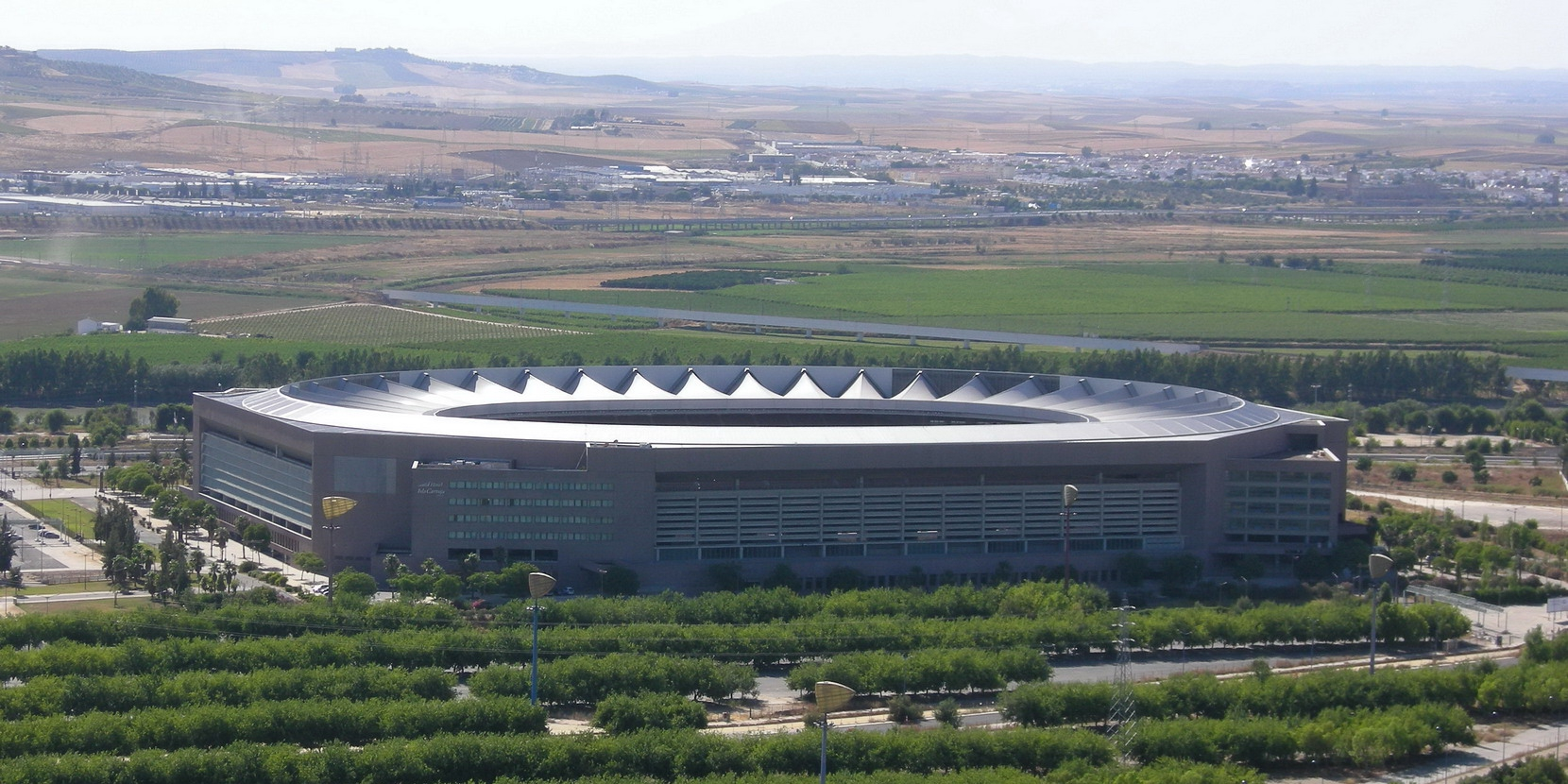
The competition venue in Seville

The 1992 Ibero-American Championships in Athletics (Spanish: V Campeonato Iberoamericano de Atletismo) was the fifth edition of the international athletics competition between Ibero-American nations which was held at the Estadio Olímpico de La Cartuja in Seville, Spain from 17–19 July. A total of 41 track and field events were contested (22 by men and 19 by women) and 14 new championship records were set.

The 1992 Barcelona Olympics were to be celebrated a month later and, as a result of timing and location, the Ibero-American Championships attracted a number of top foreign athletes who were preparing for the Olympics. A record high of 462 athletes representing 22 nations participated at the competition. The combination of high participation and performances made the 1992 edition one of the most successful in Ibero-American Championships history. The event fell within the cultural programme of the Seville Expo '92.

The Cuban delegation was the most successful: it won all four relay races and all but two of the men's and women's field events. Cuban athletes won 23 of the 41 events and ended the competition with a medal count of 36. Brazil had the second best team performance, with eight event winners from 27 medallists, while the host nation Spain had the next highest totals with three gold medals and 26 medals in total.

The marathon races were not included in the programme in 1992 (a permanent change) and were instead held separately in Barcelona that year, with Spaniards Rodrigo Gavela and Ana Isabel Alonso taking the honours. The women's triple jump was contested for the first time and Cuba's Niurka Montalvo did a long and triple jump double. Carmem de Oliveira of Brazil won both the 3000 metres and 10,000 metres races. Nineteen-year-old Iván Pedroso broke the championship record in the men's long jump. Robson da Silva won the men's 200 metres for a record fourth time consecutively.

The men's high jump winner Javier Sotomayor became Olympic champion the following August. Among other competitors, Ximena Restrepo and Ana Fidelia Quirot (the winners of the 400 m and 800 m races) went on to win Olympic bronzes at the 1992 Barcelona Games, while the winning Cuban men's relay teams also reached the Olympic podium.

== Medal summary ==
=== Men ===
Event	Gold		Silver		Bronze	
100 metres (Wind: −2.2 m/s)	Joel Isasi (CUB)	10.41	Andrés Simón (CUB)	10.52	Arnaldo da Silva (BRA)	10.54
200 metres (Wind: −2.6 m/s)	Robson da Silva (BRA)	20.58	Joel Lamela (CUB)	21.12	Sérgio Menezes (BRA)	21.44
400 metres	Sidnei Telles de Souza (BRA)	45.38	Inaldo Sena (BRA)	46.14	Henry Aguiar (VEN)	46.29
800 metres	Héctor Herrera (CUB)	1:47.72	Pablo Squella (CHI)	1:48.29	Edgar de Oliveira (BRA)	1:48.38
1500 metres	Víctor Rojas (ESP)	3:42.25 CR	Ángel Fariña (ESP)	3:42.76	Edgar de Oliveira (BRA)	3:43.26
5000 metres	Valdenor dos Santos (BRA)	13:54.79	Anacleto Jiménez (ESP)	13:55.35	Martín Fiz (ESP)	13:57.99
10,000 metres	Francisco Guerra (ESP)	28:49.15 CR	Valdenor dos Santos (BRA)	28:51.22	Rolando Vera (ECU)	28:55.16
110 m hurdles	Emilio Valle (CUB)	13.41 CR	Alexis Sánchez (CUB)	13.66	Carlos Sala (ESP)	13.76
400 m hurdles	Eronilde de Araújo (BRA)	50.06	Juan Gutiérrez (MEX)	50.26	Pedro Piñera (CUB)	50.37
3000 m steeplechase	Clodoaldo do Carmo (BRA)	8:38.55	Eduardo Henriques (POR)	8:40.35	Antonio Peula (ESP)	8:40.93
4 × 100 m relay	Cuba (CUB); Andrés Simón; Jorge Luis Aguilera; Joel Lamela; Joel Isasi	39.19	Spain (ESP); José Javier Arqués; Enrique Talavera; Juan Jesús Trampero; Sergio López	39.44	Brazil (BRA); Fernando Botasso; André da Silva; Arnaldo da Silva; Robson da Silva	39.63
4 × 400 m relay	Cuba (CUB); Norberto Téllez; Jorge Valentin; Lázaro Martínez; Roberto Hernández	3:01.58	Brazil (BRA); Sidnei Telles de Souza; Eronilde de Araújo; Ediélson Rocha Tenorio; Inaldo Justino de Sena	3:03.50	Mexico (MEX); Juan Vallín; Josué Morales; Luis Karim Toledo; Raymundo Escalante	3:05.87
20 km track walk	Alberto Cruz (MEX)	1:25:35.9	Clodomiro Moreno (COL)	1:25:41.2	Jefferson Pérez (ECU)	1:25:50.5
High jump	Javier Sotomayor (CUB)	2.30 m	Gustavo Becker (ESP)	2.26 m	Marino Drake (CUB)	2.24 m
Pole vault	Edgar Díaz (PUR)	5.40 m CR	Nuno Fernandes (POR)	5.30 m	Alberto Ruiz (ESP)	5.20 m
Long jump	Iván Pedroso (CUB)	8.53 m CR	Jesús Oliván (ESP)	7.98 m	Elmer Williams (PUR)	7.91 m
Triple jump	Yoelbi Quesada (CUB)	16.93 m (w)	Anísio Silva (BRA)	16.40 m	Juan Miguel López (CUB)	16.36 m (w)
Shot put	Gert Weil (CHI)	18.94 m	Manuel Martínez (ESP)	17.49 m	Adilson Oliveira (BRA)	17.44 m
Discus throw	Juan Martínez (CUB)	63.02 m	David Martínez (ESP)	61.56 m	Luis Delís (CUB)	61.18 m
Hammer throw	Eladio Hernández (CUB)	70.62 m CR	Andrés Charadía (ARG)	69.38 m	Guillermo Guzmán (MEX)	68.06 m
Javelin throw	Ramón González (CUB)	75.88 m CR	Luis Lucumí (COL)	74.74 m	Julián Sotelo (ESP)	70.50 m
Decathlon	Xavier Brunet (ESP)	7621 pts	José de Assis (BRA)	7480 pts	Fernando Luis Benet (ESP)	7299 pts

=== Women ===
Event	Gold		Silver		Bronze	
100 metres	Liliana Allen (CUB)	11.39 CR	Norfalia Carabalí (COL)	11.72	Claudete Alves Pina (BRA)	11.76
200 metres (Wind: −2.9 m/s)	Norfalia Carabalí (COL)	23.97	Idalmis Bonne (CUB)	24.01	Claudete Alves Pina (BRA)	24.37
400 metres	Ximena Restrepo (COL)	51.66	Myra Mayberry (PUR)	52.78	Odalmis Limonta (CUB)	53.30
800 metres	Ana Fidelia Quirot (CUB)	2:01.96	Maria Figueirêdo (BRA)	2:02.45	Elsa Amaral (POR)	2:02.75
1500 metres	Soraya Telles (BRA)	4:18.03	Estela Estévez (ESP)	4:18.40	Norma Fernández (ARG)	4:18.78
3000 metres	Carmem de Oliveira (BRA)	9:20.83	Mabel Arrúa (ARG)	9:23.24	María Luisa Servín (MEX)	9:23.71
10,000 metres	Carmem de Oliveira (BRA)	33:21.00 CR	Griselda González (ARG)	33:24.89	Martha Tenorio (ECU)	33:29.69
100 m hurdles	Aliuska López (CUB)	13.13	Odalys Adams (CUB)	13.15	María José Mardomingo (ESP)	13.71
400 m hurdles	Lency Montelier (CUB)	56.79	Miriam Alonso (ESP)	57.01	Jupira da Graça (BRA)	58.32
4 × 100 m relay	Cuba (CUB); Miriam Ferrer; Eusebia Riquelme; Idalmis Bonne; Liliana Allen	44.49	Spain (ESP); María Paz Minicozzi; Cristina Castro; Yolanda Díaz; Cristina Martín	45.53	Colombia (COL); Zorobabelia Córdoba; Ximena Restrepo; Maribelcy Peña; Norfalia Carabalí	45.54
4 × 400 m relay	Cuba (CUB); Julia Duporty; Odalmis Limonta; Lency Montelier; Ana Fidelia Quirot	3:33.43	Spain (ESP); Gregoria Ferrer; Esther Lahoz; Blanca Lacambra; Cristina Pérez	3:34.22	Uruguay (URU); Marcela Tiscornia; Soledad Acerenza; Inés Justet; Claudia Acerenza	3:46.73
10 km track walk	Francisca Martínez (MEX)	47:51.95	Olga Sánchez (ESP)	48:08.86	Miriam Ramón (ECU)	48:13.74
High jump	Ioamnet Quintero (CUB)	1.98 m CR	Silvia Costa (CUB)	1.93 m	Cristina Fink (MEX)	1.87 m
Long jump	Niurka Montalvo (CUB)	6.51 m (w)	Luisa López (ESP)	6.37 m	María Jesús Martín (ESP)	5.94 m
Triple jump	Niurka Montalvo (CUB)	13.60 m CR	Rita Slompo (BRA)	12.96 m	Andrea Ávila (ARG)	12.82 m
Shot put	Belsis Laza (CUB)	19.31 m CR	Elisângela Adriano (BRA)	16.75 m	Margarita Ramos (ESP)	16.69 m
Discus throw	Hilda Ramos (CUB)	67.46 m CR	Bárbara Hechevarría (CUB)	64.14 m	María Isabel Urrutia (COL)	57.46 m
Javelin throw (Old javelin model)	Dulce García (CUB)	57.38 m	Isel López (CUB)	55.80 m	Carla Bispo (BRA)	53.40 m
Heptathlon	Zorobabelia Córdoba (COL)	5808 pts CR, NR	Ana María Comaschi (ARG)	5795 pts NR	Ana Lúcia Silva (BRA)	5320 pts

== Medal table ==
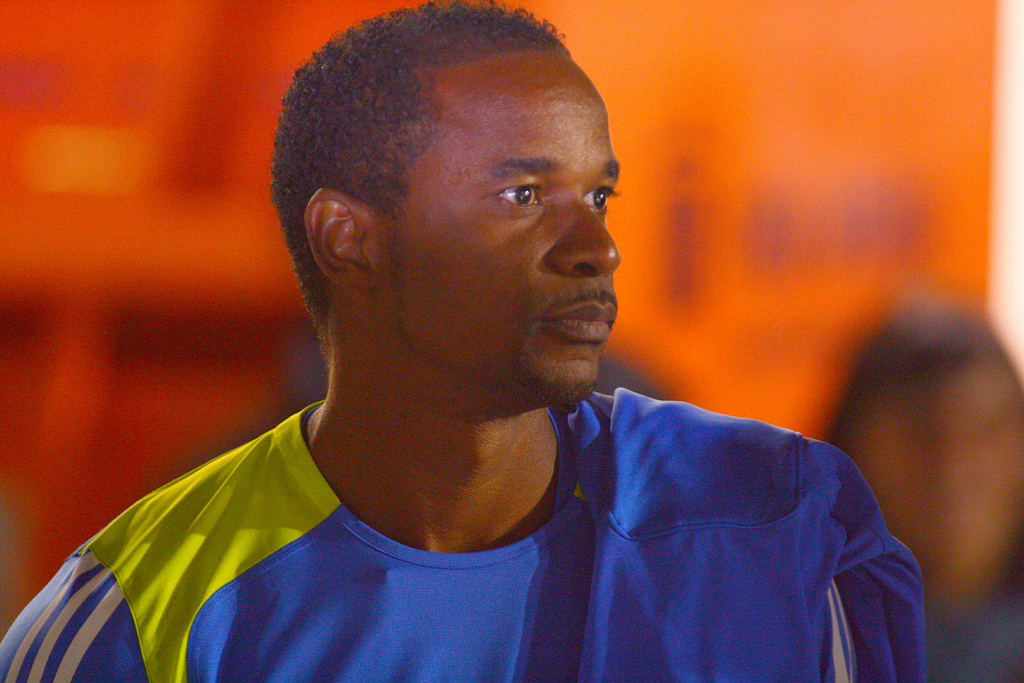
Cuba's Iván Pedroso broke the championship record to win the men's long jump.

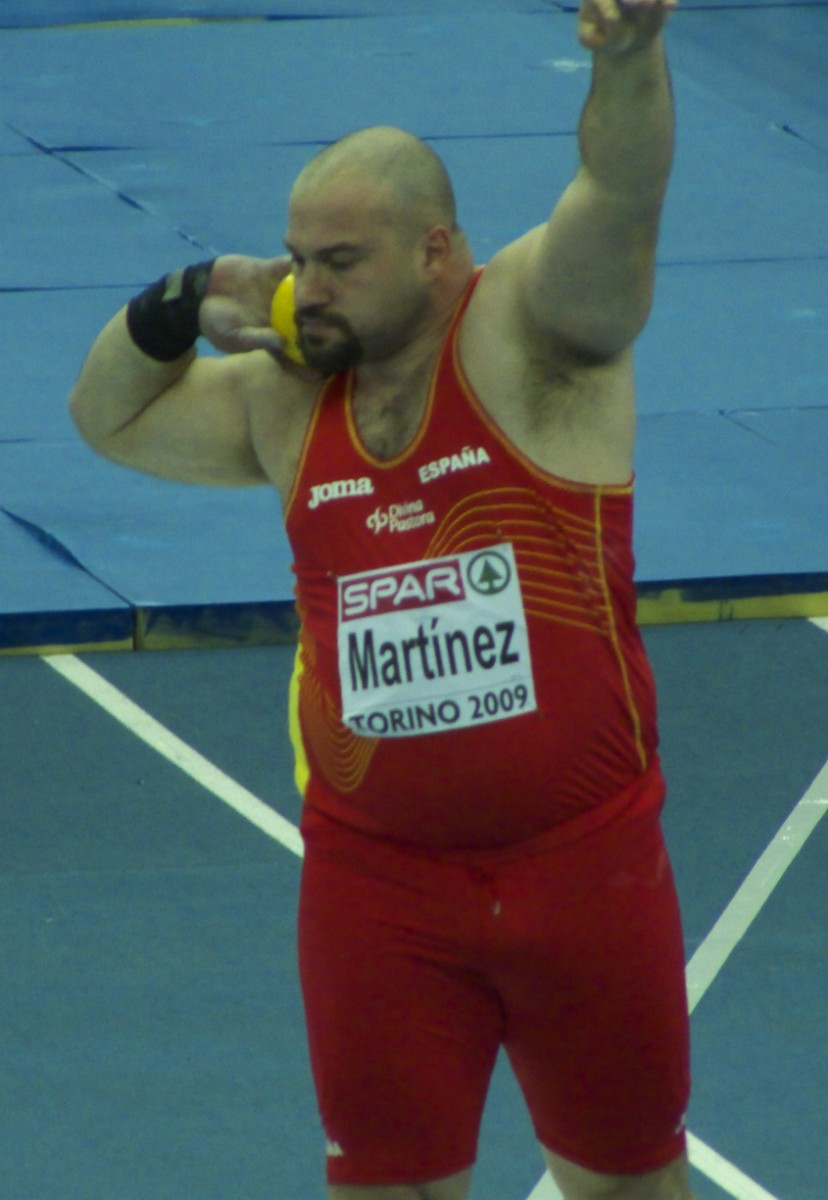
Manuel Martínez of Spain won the shot put silver medal at the age of 18.

* Host nation (Spain)

Rank	Nation	Gold	Silver	Bronze	Total
1	Cuba	23	8	5	36
2	Brazil	8	8	11	27
3	Spain*	3	13	10	26
4	Colombia	3	3	2	8
5	Mexico	2	1	4	7
6	Puerto Rico	1	1	1	3
7	Chile	1	1	0	2
8	Argentina	0	4	2	6
9	Portugal	0	2	0	2
10	Ecuador	0	0	4	4
11	Uruguay	0	0	1	1
11	Venezuela	0	0	1	1
Totals (12 entries)		41	41	41	123

- The medallists from the 1992 Ibero-American Marathon Championship (held separately in Barcelona) were later included in the official medal count. The table above excludes these medals.

== Participation ==
For the first time in the history of the competition, all twenty-two members of the Asociación Iberoamericana de Atletismo were present at the championships. Reflecting this, the number of competing athletes (462) was more than double that of the previous edition. However, only 412 participating athletes (including some guests) were counted by analysing the official result list. The higher number probably contains coaches and/or officials registered for the event.

- Argentina (36)
- Bolivia (14)
- Brazil (40)
- Chile (15)
- Colombia (16)
- Costa Rica (5)
- Cuba (44)
- Dominican Republic (5)
- Ecuador (14)
- El Salvador (6)
- Guatemala (6)
- Honduras (10)
- Mexico (37)
- Nicaragua (6)
- Panama (3)
- Paraguay (10)
- Peru (7)
- Portugal (34)
- Puerto Rico (10)
- Spain (76)
- Uruguay (8)
- Venezuela (10)
