= Athletics at the 1993 Bolivarian Games =

Athletics at the XII Bolivarian Games
- Dates: April 24 - May 2
- Host city: Cochabamba, Bolivia
- Venue: Estadio Félix Capriles
- Level: Senior
- Events: 43 (24 men, 19 women)

Athletics competitions at the 1993 Bolivarian Games were held at the Estadio Félix Capriles in Cochabamba, Bolivia, between April 24 - May 2, 1993.

Gold medal winners from Ecuador were published by the Comité Olímpico Ecuatoriano.

A total of 43 events were contested, 24 by men and 19 by women.

== Medal summary ==
Medal winners were published.

All results are marked as "affected by altitude" (A), because the stadium in Cochabamba is located at 2,582 m above sea level.

=== Men ===
Event	Gold		Silver		Bronze	
100 metres (wind: -0.3 m/s)	Wenceslao Ferrín (COL)	10.46 A	Jorge Cañizales (VEN)	10.57 A	Oscar Fernández (PER)	10.58 A
200 metres (wind: 1.2 m/s)	Jorge Cañizales (VEN)	21.11 A	Luis Vega (COL)	21.38 A	Dick Perlaza (ECU)	21.41 A
400 metres	Wilson Cañizales (COL)	46.3 A	Nelson García (VEN)	47.2 A	Dick Perlaza (ECU)	47.4 A
800 metres	Juan Tapía (PAN)	1:52.24 A	Isaac Espinosa (PER)	1:52.52 A	Leonel Aponte (VEN)	1:53.07 A
1500 metres	Silvio Guerra (ECU)	3:57.01 A	Freddy Caiza (ECU)	3:57.46 A	Isaac Espinosa (PER)	3:57.97 A
5000 metres	Silvio Guerra (ECU)	14:31.00 A	Silvano Simeón (PER)	14:42.98 A	Mariano Mamanes (BOL)	14:43.90 A
10,000 metres	Rolando Vera (ECU)	30:16.49 A	Mariano Mamanes (BOL)	30:40.42 A	Néstor Quinapanta (ECU)	30:43.86 A
Marathon^{†}	Freddy Luján (BOL)	2:16:24 A	Carlos Muñoz (ECU)	2:17:04 A	Víctor Sulbarán (VEN)	2:19:32 A
3000 metres steeplechase	Silvano Simeón (PER)	9:13.13 A	Franklin Tenorio (ECU)	9:13.99 A	Silvio Guerra (ECU)	9:29.65 A
110 metres hurdles (wind: 0.7 m/s)	Gonzalo González (VEN)	14.48 A	Federico Ifill (VEN)	14.49 A	Omar Triviño (ECU)	14.71 A
400 metres hurdles	Llimy Rivas (COL)	52.21 A	Wilfredo Ferrer (VEN)	52.46 A	Víctor Mendoza (PER)	52.94 A
4 × 100 metres relay	Colombia; Wilson Cañizales; Wenceslao Ferrín; Luis Alfonso Vega; Robinson Urrutia	39.96 A	Venezuela; Benigno Chourio; Jorge Cañizales; Douglas Figueroa; Slym Guzmán	40.12 A	Ecuador; Dick Perlaza; Aurelio Mancheno; Fernando Espinosa; Gerardo Reyes	40.25 A
4 × 400 metres relay	Colombia; Robinson Urrutia; Llimy Rivas; Luis Alfonso Vega; Wilson Cañizales	3:10.51 A	Venezuela; Juan Díaz; Nelson García; Leonel Aponte; José Castillo	3:12.62 A	Ecuador; Jorge Almeida; Dick Perlaza; Aurelio Mancheno; Fernando Espinosa	3:12.89 A
20 Kilometres Road Walk	Jefferson Pérez (ECU)	1:26:19 A	Héctor Moreno (COL)	1:26:24 A	Carlos Ramones (VEN)	1:33:47 A
50 Kilometres Road Walk	Luis Quispe (BOL)	4:14:36 A	Rodrigo Moreno (COL)	4:18:47 A	Juan Sandi (BOL)	4:36:17 A
High jump	Gilmar Mayo (COL)	2.20 A	Hugo Muñoz (PER)	2.15 A	Valery Abugattás (PER)	2.15 A
Pole vault	Konstantín Zagustín (VEN)	5.10 A	Ricardo Diez (VEN)	4.70 A	Rubén Herrada (VEN)	4.10 A
Long jump	Ricardo Valiente (PER)	7.64 A	Sergio Saavedra (VEN)	7.59 A	Luis Lorduy (COL)	7.52 A
Triple jump	Sergio Saavedra (VEN)	16.47 A	Ricardo Valiente (PER)	16.38 A	Miguel Padrón (VEN)	16.13 A
Shot put	Yojer Medina (VEN)	17.46 A	Celso Aragón (COL)	15.61 A	Luis García (ECU)	13.57 A
Discus throw	Yojer Medina (VEN)	53.64 A	Rogelio Ospina (COL)	52.42 A	Luis Palacios (VEN)	47.28 A
Hammer throw	Jorge Pereira (VEN)	55.78 A	Luis García (ECU)	51.82 A	Eduardo Acuña (PER)	48.14 A
Javelin throw	Luis Lucumí (COL)	73.26 A	Carlos Pantín (VEN)	68.14 A	Leonidas López (ECU)	59.00 A
Decathlon	Diógenes Estévez (VEN)	6735 A	Rubén Herrada (VEN)	6662 A	Arnold Chara (COL)	6585 A

==== Notes ====
^{†}: short course (about 39.5 km)

=== Women ===
Event	Gold		Silver		Bronze	
100 metres (wind: 1.5 m/s)	Carmen Rodríguez (VEN)	11.96 A	Mirtha Brock (COL)	12.03 A	Elia Mera (COL)	12.16 A
200 metres (wind: -2.2 m/s)	Patricia Rodríguez (COL)	23.94 A	Carmen Rodríguez (VEN)	24.50 A	Elia Mera (COL)	24.68 A
400 metres	Norfalia Carabalí (COL)	52.48 A	Patricia Rodríguez (COL)	54.15 A	Jacqueline Soliz (BOL)	56.56 A
800 metres	Norfalia Carabalí (COL)	2:22.48 A	Janeth Caizalitín (ECU)	2:23.42 A	Miriam Achote (ECU)	2:24.15 A
1500 metres	Janeth Caizalitín (ECU)	4:33.21 A	Miriam Achote (ECU)	4:38.90 A	María Elena Calle (ECU)	4:46.67 A
3000 metres	Janeth Caizalitín (ECU)	9:49.71 A	Martha Tenorio (ECU)	9:50.37 A	María Elena Calle (ECU)	10:22.35 A
10,000 metres	Martha Tenorio (ECU)	35:12.10 A	María Castro (COL)	36:39.20 A	Bertha Vera (ECU)	38:12.65 A
Marathon^{†}	Ximena Albán (ECU)	2:51:34 A	Ludgarda Muriel (BOL)	3:01:37 A	Justina Calizaya (BOL)	3:02:55 A
100 metres hurdles (wind: -1.6 m/s)	Ivette Sánchez (PAN)	15.03 A	Yadira Aguilar (VEN)	15.10 A	Rocío Martínez (ECU)	15.61 A
400 metres hurdles	Liliana Chalá (ECU)	58.44 A	Maribelsy Peña (COL)	60.11 A	Flor Robledo (COL)	63.35 A
4 × 100 metres relay	Colombia; Norfalia Carabalí; Patricia Rodríguez; Elia Mera; Mirtha Brock	44.80 A	Ecuador; Liliana Chalá; Ana Caicedo; Janee Nazareno; Cristina Vela	47.60 A	Bolivia; Jacqueline Solíz; Elizabeth Arteaga; Ana Maria Luzio; Rodríguez	48.11 A
4 × 400 metres relay	Colombia; Elia Mera; Norfalia Carabalí; Maribelcy Peña; Patricia Rodríguez	3:42.41 A	Ecuador; Carmen Chalá; Liliana Chalá; Cristina Vela; Mayra Cachi	3:53.16 A	Venezuela; Carmen Méndez; Xiomara Díaz; Cooper; Rubia Quintanilla	3:55.13 A
10 Kilometres Road Walk	Bertha Vera (ECU)	48:33 A	Miriam Ramón (ECU)	48:47 A	Shirley Morejón (BOL)	49:30 A
High jump	Teresa Rodríguez (VEN)	1.64 A	Marlene Montaño (BOL)	1.64 A	Vivian González (VEN)	1.64 A
Long jump	Glamaris Morillo (VEN)	5.90 A	Zorobabelia Córdoba (COL)	5.85 A	Ana Caicedo (ECU)	5.78 A
Shot put	María Isabel Urrutia (COL)	15.35 A	Carmen Chalá (ECU)	14.84 A	Rosa Peña (PER)	13.34 A
Discus throw	María Isabel Urrutia (COL)	54.08 A	Carmen Chalá (ECU)	48.36 A	Neolanis Suárez (VEN)	39.78 A
Javelin throw	Verónica Prieto (COL)	46.92 A	Patricia Alonso (VEN)	45.82 A	Isabel Ordóñez (ECU)	45.32 A
Heptathlon	Zorobabelia Córdoba (COL)	5110 A	Rubia Quintanilla (VEN)	4404 A	Elizabeth Arteaga (BOL)	4402 A

==== Notes ====
^{†}: short course (about 39.5 km)

== Medal table (unofficial) ==
* Host nation (Bolivia)

Rank	Nation	Gold	Silver	Bronze	Total
1	Colombia	16	10	5	31
2	Venezuela	11	14	9	34
3	Ecuador	10	12	16	38
4	Peru	2	4	6	12
5	Bolivia*	2	3	7	12
6	Panama	2	0	0	2
Totals (6 entries)		43	43	43	129
