= 1993 South American Junior Championships in Athletics =

XXV South American Junior Championships in Athletics
- Dates: June 18–20
- Host city: Puerto la Cruz, Venezuela
- Level: Junior
- Events: 41
- Participation: about 205 athletes from 11 nations

The 25th South American Junior Championships in Athletics were held in Puerto la Cruz, Venezuela from June 18–20, 1993.

== Participation (unofficial) ==
Detailed result lists can be found on the "World Junior Athletics History" website. An unofficial count yields the number of about 205 athletes from about 11 countries: Argentina (20), Bolivia (3), Brazil (37), Chile (31), Colombia (19), Ecuador (21), Guyana (1), Panama (2), Peru (6), Uruguay (6), Venezuela (59).

== Medal summary ==
Medal winners are published for men and women Complete results can be found on the "World Junior Athletics History" website.

=== Men ===
| Event | Gold | | Silver | | Bronze | |
|---|---|---|---|---|---|---|
| 100 metres | Alfredo Richards (PAN) | 10.3 (semi-final 10.2 meet record) | Pablo Almeida (CHI) | 10.4 | Slym Guzmán (VEN) | 10.5 |
| 200 metres | Jair Moreira (BRA) | 21.59 | Douglas Figueroa (VEN) | 21.63 | Alfredo Richards (PAN) | 21.68 |
| 400 metres | Sanderlei Parrela (BRA) | 47.86 | Víctor Hugo Goulart (BRA) | 48.85 | Jonathan Gómez (COL) | 48.88 |
| 800 metres | Mark Olivo (VEN) | 1:53.7 | Silvio Xavier (BRA) | 1:54.6 | Gerardo Berón (ARG) | 1:55.0 |
| 1500 metres | Mariano Tarilo (ARG) | 3:51.45 | Hudson Lemos (BRA) | 3:55.15 | Mark Olivo (VEN) | 3:55.94 |
| 5000 metres | Elías Bastos (BRA) | 14:51.2 | Fábio Viscola (BRA) | 14:51.4 | Jorge Chávez (PER) | 15:00.6 |
| 10,000 metres | Elías Bastos (BRA) | 31:29.9 | Fábio Viscola (BRA) | 31:32.2 | Horacio Ferreyra (ARG) | 31:37.0 |
| 110 metres hurdles | Emerson Perín (BRA) | 14.66 | Gabriel Corradini (ARG) | 15.03 | Alejandro Briceño (VEN) | 15.25 |
| 400 metres hurdles | Emerson da Silva (BRA) | 53.23 | Alejandro Hidalgo (VEN) | 53.63 | Juan Mago (VEN) | 53.69 |
| 3000 metres steeplechase | Diego Grisales (COL) | 9:00.6 | Marcelo Silva (BRA) | 9:07.0 | Mariano Tarilo (ARG) | 9:19.4 |
| 4 × 100 metres relay | Brazil; Sérgio dos Santos; Emerson Perin; Víctor Goulart; Jair Moreira | 41.2 | Venezuela; Douglas Figueroa; Slym Guzmán; Alexander Cotty; Néstor Smith | 41.4 | Chile; Miguel Sabarots; Juan Pablo Faúndez; Carlos Sandoval; Pablo Almeida | 41.6 |
| 4 × 400 metres relay | Brazil; Jair Moreira; Everson Teixeira; Sanderlei Parrela; Víctor Goulart | 3:17.18 | Venezuela; Irwin Carvajal; Marcos Faure; Álvarez; Douglas Figueroa | 3:17.26 | Colombia; Vladimir Zape; Alcides Pinto; Jonathan Gómez; Álvaro Portela | 3:18.93 |
| 10,000 metres track walk | Jefferson Pérez (ECU) | 42:24.2 | Reinaldo Rosario (VEN) | 44:37.3 | João Sendeski (BRA) | 45:43.0 |
| High jump | Paulo Ruimar (BRA) | 2.14 | Wilfredo Carias (VEN) | 2.04 | Felipe Apablaza (CHI) | 2.04 |
| Pole vault | Ricardo Diez (VEN) | 4.70 | Johnny Romero (VEN) | 4.20 | Santiago Vázquez (ARG) | 4.00 |
| Long jump | Sérgio dos Santos (BRA) | 7.19 | Gastón González (VEN) | 6.86 | Antonio Bruznal (VEN) | 6.84 |
| Triple jump | Sérgio dos Santos (BRA) | 15.26 | Juan Hernández (URU) | 14.22 | Juan Moya (VEN) | 13.95 |
| Shot put | Mauro Ordiales (ARG) | 15.47 | Gerardo Maurer (CHI) | 15.09 | Hugo Scévola (ARG) | 14.58 |
| Discus throw | Julio Piñero (ARG) | 52.52 | Mauro Ordiales (ARG) | 44.80 | Juan Tello (PER) | 44.42 |
| Hammer throw | Juan Cerra (ARG) | 58.02 | Rodolfo García (VEN) | 55.80 | Javier Álvarez (ARG) | 54.14 |
| Javelin throw | José Oliveira (BRA) | 61.60 | Julio Piñero (ARG) | 58.18 | Diego Moraga (CHI) | 57.18 |
| Decathlon | Márcio de Souza (BRA) | 6613 | José Oliveira (BRA) | 6454 | Jeremy Racey (CHI) | 6110 |

=== Women ===
| Event | Gold | | Silver | | Bronze | |
|---|---|---|---|---|---|---|
| 100 metres | Helena Guerrero (COL) | 11.8 | Lucimar de Moura (BRA) | 11.8 | Ana Caicedo (ECU) | 12.0 |
| 200 metres | Lucimar de Moura (BRA) | 24.58 | Helena Guerrero (COL) | 24.80 | Lisette Rondón (CHI) | 25.08 |
| 400 metres | Kelly de Oliveira (BRA) | 55.88 | Marcela Barros (CHI) | 56.41 | Maricel Palmieri (ARG) | 56.57 |
| 800 metres | Janeth Caizalitín (ECU) | 2:09.4 | Clara Morales (CHI) | 2:14.6 | Shirley Ferreira (BRA) | 2:16.6 |
| 1500 metres | Janeth Caizalitín (ECU) | 4:37.99 | Clara Morales (CHI) | 4:42.90 | Karina Moncayo (ECU) | 4:45.20 |
| 3000 metres | Janeth Caizalitín (ECU) | 9:53.6 | Sandra Torres Álvarez (ARG) | 10:04.9 | María Elena Calle (ECU) | 10:05.0 |
| 10,000 metres | Vivian Aguiar (BRA) | 37:23.9 | Bertha Vera (ECU) | 37:58.7 | María Elena Calle (ECU) | 38:36.8 |
| 100 metres hurdles | Marília de Souza (BRA) | 13.72 | Gilda Massa (PER) | 13.72 | Samantha de Souza (BRA) | 14.82 |
| 400 metres hurdles | Kelly de Oliveira (BRA) | 61.16 | Maricel Palmieri (ARG) | 62.34 | Jetzahen Romero (VEN) | 65.29 |
| 4 × 100 metres relay | Chile; María José Abasolo; Hannelore Grosser; Lisette Rondón; Mónica Castro | 47.9 | Colombia; Felipa Palacios; Clara Córdoba; Liset Valois; Elena Guerrero | 48.1 | Brazil; Anice Schoulten; Cristiane Barbosa; Kelly de Oliveira; Lucimar de Moura | 48.1 |
| 4 × 400 metres relay | Brazil; Anice Schoulten; Marília de Souza; Sandra Ferreira; Kelly de Oliveira | 3:48.9 | Chile; Marcela Barros; Miales; Lisette Rondón; Hannelore Grosser | 3:51.0 | Colombia; Sara Durango; Solengela Cuellar; Liset Valois; Janeth Lucumí | 3:56.4 |
| 5000 metres track walk | Bertha Vera (ECU) | 23:07.5 | Nohora Paque (COL) | 25:44.9 | Ivana Henn (BRA) | 26:27.0 |
| High jump | Solange Witteveen (ARG) | 1.75 | Claudia Casals (ARG) | 1.72 | Luciane Dambacher (BRA) | 1.72 |
| Long jump | Helena Guerrero (COL) | 5.97 | Gilda Massa (PER) | 5.93 | Ana Caicedo (ECU) | 5.70 |
| Triple jump | Gilda Massa (PER) | 12.03 | Neleyana Silva (BRA) | 11.72 | Felipa Palacios (COL) | 11.72 |
| Shot put | Margit Wahlbrink (BRA) | 12.82 | Clara Palacios (COL) | 12.21 | Nefertity Zurita (VEN) | 12.13 |
| Discus throw | María Eugenia Giggi (ARG) | 44.66 | Clara Palacios (COL) | 41.16 | Marisol Bengoa (CHI) | 40.66 |
| Javelin throw | Sabina Moya (COL) | 47.74 | Clara Vargas (CHI) | 47.02 | Zuleima Araméndiz (COL) | 46.46 |
| Heptathlon | Claudia Casals (ARG) | 4590 | Kátia da Silva (BRA) | 4574 | Minerva Navarrete (CHI) | 4198 |

== Medal table (unofficial) ==
* Host nation (Venezuela)

| Rank | Nation | Gold | Silver | Bronze | Total |
|---|---|---|---|---|---|
| 1 | Brazil | 20 | 10 | 6 | 36 |
| 2 | Argentina | 7 | 6 | 7 | 20 |
| 3 | Ecuador | 5 | 1 | 5 | 11 |
| 4 | Colombia | 4 | 5 | 5 | 14 |
| 5 | Venezuela* | 2 | 9 | 8 | 19 |
| 6 | Chile | 1 | 7 | 7 | 15 |
| 7 | Peru | 1 | 2 | 2 | 5 |
| 8 | Panama | 1 | 0 | 1 | 2 |
| 9 | Uruguay | 0 | 1 | 0 | 1 |
| Totals (9 entries) | | 41 | 41 | 41 | 123 |
