= Niurka Montalvo =

Cuban-Spanish long and triple jumper (born 1968)

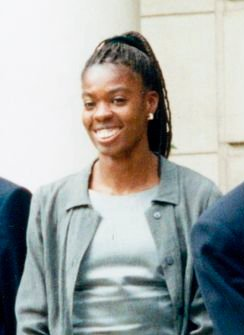
- Montalvo in 1999

Personal information
- Born: June 4, 1968 (age 58) Havana, Cuba

Sport
- Sport: Track and field
Medal record
Women's athletics
Representing Cuba
World Championships
Silver medal – second place	1995 Gothenburg	Long jump
Pan American Games
Gold medal – first place	1995 Mar de Plata	Long jump
Silver medal – second place	1995 Mar de Plata	Triple jump
Central American and Caribbean Games
Gold medal – first place	1990 Mexico City	Long jump
Gold medal – first place	1993 Ponce	Long jump
Gold medal – first place	1993 Ponce	Triple jump
CAC Junior Championships (U20)
Gold medal – first place	1986 Mexico City	Long jump
Silver medal – second place	1986 Mexico City	100 m hurdles
Representing Spain
World Championships
Gold medal – first place	1999 Seville	Long jump
Bronze medal – third place	2001 Edmonton	Long jump
Mediterranean Games
Silver medal – second place	2005 Almería	Long jump

Niurka Montalvo Amaro (born June 4, 1968, in Havana) is a former Cuban and Spanish athlete who specialised in the long jump and triple jump events. Her greatest achievement came in 1999, when she became world champion with a personal best jump of 7.06 metres. She was the autonomous secretary of sport for the Autonomous government of Valencia.

== Career ==
=== Early life ===
She began her international career with a medal at the 1986 Pan American Junior Championships, taking the bronze in the long jump. Senior medals soon followed: at the Central American and Caribbean Championships she won the long jump gold at the 1987 edition, and another gold came at the 1990 Central American and Caribbean Games.

Her first appearance at global level came at the 1991 IAAF World Indoor Championships, where she finished fifth in the long jump. She demonstrated further skills when she scored a double gold in the long jump and triple jump events at both the 1993 Central American and Caribbean Championships in Athletics and the 1993 Central American and Caribbean Games. That year she went on to become the Summer Universiade champion in the triple jump and just missed out on the medals with a fourth-place finish at the 1993 World Championships in Athletics. She represented America at the 1994 IAAF World Cup and won the long jump silver behind Inessa Kravets with a best mark of 6.70 m.

The 1995 season was a breakthrough for Montalvo as she won triple jump silver and long jump at the 1995 Pan American Games before going on to win her first world medal – a jump of 6.86 m brought her a silver medal behind Fiona May in the long jump final at the 1995 World Championships in Athletics. She had mixed fortunes in triple jump that year, finishing sixth at the 1995 IAAF World Indoor Championships, but fifteenth in the qualifiers of the outdoor championships.

The few years following her world silver she focused solely on the long jump, but to limited success: she failed to make it out of the qualifying round at either the 1996 Summer Olympics or the 1997 IAAF World Indoor Championships and a fifth place at the 1998 IAAF Grand Prix Final was a modest highlight to a year.

=== Transfer to Spain ===
In 1999 she acquired Spanish citizenship by marriage, something which stirred a great amount of controversy. The move brought renewed efforts on the world stage as she became the world champion in the long jump with a gold medal at the 1999 World Championships in Athletics. The Cuban Athletics Federation blocked her participation in the 2000 Summer Olympics, and in addition, she was reportedly included on a list of possible assassination targets for ETA.

Montalvo refused to let this disrupt her athletics career and she won a series of bronze medals after this, starting with the 2000 IAAF Grand Prix Final and then at the 2001 IAAF World Indoor Championships and the 2001 World Championships in Athletics. More medals came at regional competitions, with a gold at the 2004 Ibero-American Championships and a silver behind her 1995 World Championships adversary, Fiona May, at the 2005 Mediterranean Games.

She finished seventh in the long jump final at the 2006 European Athletics Championships in Gothenburg at the age of 38.

== Personal Bests ==
- 100 metres hurdles - 13.57 (1990)
- Long jump - 7.06 (1999)
- Triple jump - 14.60 (1994)

== International competitions ==
Year	Competition	Venue	Position	Event	Notes
Representing Cuba
1986	Central American and Caribbean Junior Championships (U-20)	Mexico City, Mexico	2nd	100 m hurdles	14.20 A
1986	Central American and Caribbean Junior Championships (U-20)	Mexico City, Mexico	1st	Long jump	6.29 m A
1986	World Junior Championships	Athens, Greece	11th (sf)	100 m hurdles	14.28 (+1.1 m/s)
1986	World Junior Championships	Athens, Greece	14th (q)	Long jump	5.86 m
1986	Ibero-American Championships	Havana, Cuba	2nd	Long jump	6.11 m (+1.6 m/s)
1987	Central American and Caribbean Championships	Caracas, Venezuela	3rd	4 × 100 m relay	47.01
1988	Ibero-American Championships	Mexico City, Mexico	2nd	Long jump	6.55 m A
1990	Central American and Caribbean Games	Mexico City, Mexico	1st	Long jump	6.58 m
1991	World Indoor Championships	Seville, Spain	5th	Long jump	6.68 m
1991	Pan American Games	Havana, Cuba	10th	Long jump	6.04 m
1992	Ibero-American Championships	Seville, Spain	1st	Long jump	6.51 m w (+2.2 m/s)
1992	Ibero-American Championships	Seville, Spain	1st	Triple jump	13.60 m (+1.1 m/s)
1993	Universiade	Buffalo, United States	1st	Long jump	14.16 m (w)
1993	World Championships	Stuttgart, Germany	4th	Triple jump	14.22 m (0.2 m/s)
1993	Central American and Caribbean Games	Ponce, Puerto Rico	1st	Long jump	6.37 m
1993	Central American and Caribbean Games	Ponce, Puerto Rico	1st	Triple jump	13.57 m
1994	Goodwill Games	St. Petersburg, Russia	5th	Triple jump	13.54 m
1995	World Indoor Championships	Barcelona, Spain	6th	Triple jump	14.04 m
1995	Pan American Games	Mar del Plata, Argentina	1st	Long jump	6.89 m
1995	Pan American Games	Mar del Plata, Argentina	2nd	Triple jump	13.90 m (w)
1995	World Championships	Gothenburg, Sweden	2nd	Long jump	6.86 m (0.5 m/s)
1995	World Championships	Gothenburg, Sweden	15th (q)	Triple jump	11.40 m (1.1 m/s)
1996	Olympic Games	Atlanta, United States	17th (q)	Long jump	6.48 m (-0.8 m/s)
Representing Spain
1999	World Championships	Seville, Spain	1st	Long jump	7.06 m NR (-0.1 m/s)
2001	World Championships	Edmonton, Canada	3rd	Long jump	6.88 m w (2.1 m/s)
2001	Goodwill Games	Brisbane, Australia	5th	Long jump	6.78 m
