= 1992 South American Junior Championships in Athletics =

XXIV South American Junior Championships in Athletics
- Dates: August 21–23
- Host city: Lima, Peru
- Level: Junior
- Events: 41
- Participation: about 191 athletes from 10 nations

The 24th South American Junior Championships in Athletics were held in Lima, Peru from August 21–23, 1992.

== Participation (unofficial) ==
Detailed result lists can be found on the "World Junior Athletics History" website. An unofficial count yields the number of about 191 athletes from about 10 countries: Bolivia (9), Brazil (44), Chile (29), Colombia (9), Ecuador (17), Panama (4), Paraguay (3), Peru (45), Uruguay (3), Venezuela (28).

== Medal summary ==
Medal winners are published for men and women Complete results can be found on the "World Junior Athletics History" website.

=== Men ===
Event	Gold		Silver		Bronze	
100 metres	Luis Vega (COL)	11.1	Pablo Almeida (CHI)	11.1	Clovis Schneider (BRA)	11.1
200 metres	Sebastián Keitel (CHI)	21.5	Luis Vega (COL)	21.8	Douglas Figueroa (VEN)	21.9
400 metres	Ronaldo dos Santos (BRA)	48.3	Sebastián Keitel (CHI)	48.4	Gustavo del Castillo (PAN)	48.5
800 metres	Alexandre Oliveira (BRA)	1:52.6	Mark Olivo (VEN)	1:52.7	Márcio de Resende (BRA)	1:53.2
1500 metres	Mark Olivo (VEN)	3:53.8	Jaciel da Silva (BRA)	3:54.1	Néstor Nieves (VEN)	3:57.0
5000 metres	Emerson Vettori (BRA)	14:39.3	Elías Bastos (BRA)	14:49.1	Francisco Galindo (PER)	14:50.9
10,000 metres	José Alejandro Semprún (VEN)	30:32.6	Elías Bastos (BRA)	30:40.4	Jorge Chávez (PER)	30:43.2
110 metres hurdles	Emerson Perín (BRA)	14.5	Cleverson da Silva (BRA)	14.6	José Gregorio Turbay (VEN)	14.9
400 metres hurdles	Emerson da Silva (BRA)	51.9	Víctor Mendoza (PER)	51.9	Sérgio Ribeiro (BRA)	52.5
3000 metres steeplechase	Emerson Vettori (BRA)	8:57.2	Néstor Nieves (VEN)	9:05.1	Jaciel da Silva (BRA)	9:06.0
4 × 100 metres relay	Brazil; Jair Moreira; Sérgio Ribeiro; Emerson Perin; Clovis Schnaider	41.5	Venezuela; Kelvin Briceño; Douglas Figueroa; José Turbay; Slym Guzmán	41.8	Colombia; Julián Sánchez; Álvaro Portela; Ricardo Segura; Luis Vega	42.5
4 × 400 metres relay	Brazil	3:15.4	Colombia	3:15.9	Chile	3:24.6
10,000 metres track walk	Jefferson Pérez (ECU)	45:31.2	Reinaldo Rosario (VEN)	45:50.0	João Sendeski (BRA)	46:31.5
High jump	Hugo Muñoz (PER)	2.06	Paulo Ruimar (BRA)	2.03	Franco Moy (PER)	1.95
Pole vault	Ricardo Diez (VEN)	4.30	Luis Hidalgo (VEN)	4.30	Andrés Fernández (CHI)	4.00
Long jump	Márcio da Cruz (BRA)	7.36	Nelson Ferreira (BRA)	7.33	Pedro Brao (VEN)	6.68
Triple jump	Márcio da Cruz (BRA)	15.65	Antônio da Costa (BRA)	14.94	Franco Moy (PER)	14.82
Shot put	Yojer Medina (VEN)	16.77	Simerio Teixeira (BRA)	14.44	Juan Tello (PER)	14.24
Discus throw	Yojer Medina (VEN)	48.40	Juan Tello (PER)	42.10	Antonio Consiglieri (PER)	40.90
Hammer throw	Rodolfo García (VEN)	50.70	Aloisio da Silva (BRA)	46.48	Simerio Teixeira (BRA)	44.26
Javelin throw	Nery Kennedy (PAR)	63.30	Yojer Medina (VEN)	63.18	Flavio de Souza (BRA)	60.38
Decathlon	Alexis Recioy (URU)	5973	Vinicius Barbosa (BRA)	5927	Luis Rafael Mariño (VEN)	5772

=== Women ===
Event	Gold		Silver		Bronze	
100 metres	Lucimar de Moura (BRA)	11.8	Mônica Figueirêdo (BRA)	12.0	Lisette Rondón (CHI)	12.0
200 metres	Lucimar de Moura (BRA)	24.8	Lisette Rondón (CHI)	24.9	Mônica Figueirêdo (BRA)	24.9
400 metres	Fátima dos Santos (BRA)	55.0	Andrea Hoelzel (CHI)	57.6	Norma Pinheiro (BRA)	58.3
800 metres	Fátima dos Santos (BRA)	2:09.8	Janeth Caizalitín (ECU)	2:11.3	Clara Morales (CHI)	2:17.4
1500 metres	Janeth Caizalitín (ECU)	4:37.1	Clara Morales (CHI)	4:43.8	Miriam Achote (ECU)	4:45.9
3000 metres	Janeth Caizalitín (ECU)	9:53.4	Bertha Vera (ECU)	10:09.6	Fabiana Cristine da Silva (BRA)	10:17.9
10,000 metres	Bertha Vera (ECU)	37:41.5	Carla Velásquez (BOL)	38:08.7	Fabiana Cristine da Silva (BRA)	38:09.3
100 metres hurdles	Gilda Massa (PER)	14.2	Antonina Santângelo (BRA)	14.4	Marília de Souza (BRA)	14.5
400 metres hurdles	Kelly de Oliveira (BRA)	61.9	Velma Rodallega (VEN)	65.1	Marina Canelas (VEN)	65.2
4 × 100 metres relay	Brazil; Norma Pinneiro; Marília de Souza; Mônica Figueirêdo; Lucimar de Moura	46.8	Chile; Marcela Barros; Lisette Rondón; Andrea Hoelzel; María Isabel Coloma	47.9	Peru; Patricia Hasegawa; Gina Alvarado; Patricia Vargas; Gilda Massa	48.4
4 × 400 metres relay	Brazil; Kelly de Oliveira; Norma Aparecida; Mônica Figueirêdo; Fatima dos Santos	3:47.4	Chile; Lisette Rondón; Andrea Hoelzel; Clara Morales; Marcela Barros	3:55.0	Ecuador; Mayra Cachi; Monica Chalá; Janeth Caizaltin; Sandra Barragan	4:01.2
5000 metres track walk	Miriam Ramón (ECU)	24:03.6	Bertha Vera (ECU)	24:04.2	Geovana Irusta (BOL)	24:33.2
High jump	Teresa Rodríguez (VEN)	1.65	Soledad Harambour (CHI)	1.65	Luciane Dambacher (BRA)	1.62
Long jump	Gilda Massa (PER)	5.72	Lucineide de Oliveira (BRA)	5.69	Claudia Valle (CHI)	5.44
Triple jump	Adriana Matoso (BRA)	11.66	Lucineide de Oliveira (BRA)	11.64	Karla Salazar (PER)	11.25
Shot put	Margit Wahlbrink (BRA)	13.20	Nefertity Zurita (VEN)	12.55	Neolanis Suárez (VEN)	11.66
Discus throw	Neolanis Suárez (VEN)	40.64	Nefertity Zurita (VEN)	38.44	Neila Solange (BRA)	37.12
Javelin throw	Zuleima Araméndiz (COL)	50.92	Patricia Alonso (VEN)	47.56	Martha Rodríguez (VEN)	46.42
Heptathlon	Eliomara Carvalho (BRA)	4511	María Pesce (URU)	4280	Samantha de Souza (BRA)	4196

== Medal table (unofficial) ==
* Host nation (Peru)

Rank	Nation	Gold	Silver	Bronze	Total
1	Brazil	20	14	15	49
2	Venezuela	8	10	8	26
3	Ecuador	5	3	2	10
4	Peru*	3	2	8	13
5	Colombia	2	2	1	5
6	Chile	1	8	5	14
7	Uruguay	1	1	0	2
8	Paraguay	1	0	0	1
9	Bolivia	0	1	1	2
10	Panama	0	0	1	1
Totals (10 entries)		41	41	41	123
