= Athletics at the 1999 Pan American Games – Women's 1500 metres =

Women's 1500 metres at the Pan American Games

The women's 1500 metres event at the 1999 Pan American Games was held on July 28.

== Results ==
Rank	Name	Nationality	Time	Notes
1st place, gold medalist(s)	Marla Runyan	United States	4:16.86	
2nd place, silver medalist(s)	Leah Pells	Canada	4:16.86	
3rd place, bronze medalist(s)	Stephanie Best	United States	4:18.44	
4	Cindy O'Krane	Canada	4:19.63	
5	Bertha Sánchez	Colombia	4:21.10	
6	Janeth Caizalitín	Ecuador	4:24.68	
7	Niuvis Pie	Cuba	4:25.70	
8	Yanelis Lara	Cuba	4:26.02	
9	Niusha Mancilla	Bolivia	4:26.71	
	Madrea Hyman	Jamaica	DNS	
	Janil Williams	Antigua and Barbuda	DNS	
