= María Eugenia Villamizar =

Colombian hammer thrower (born 1970)

Personal information
- Born: August 30, 1970 (age 55)

Sport
- Country: Colombia
- Sport: Athletics
- Event: Hammer

Achievements and titles
- Personal best: 59.86m
Medal record
Representing Colombia
Pan American Games
Silver medal – second place	1995 Mar del Plata	Hammer throw
Central American and Caribbean Games
Silver medal – second place	1998 Maracaibo	Hammer throw
South American Games
Gold medal – first place	1998 Cuenca	Discus throw
Gold medal – first place	1998 Cuenca	Hammer throw
- Updated on 11 August 2016

María Eugenia Villamizar Amado (born 30 August 1970) is a retired Colombian athlete who specialised in the hammer throw. She dominated the event on regional level in the 1990s.

Her personal best throw is 59.86 metres, set in Bogotá in 2002.

She also competed in weightlifting.

== Competition record ==
Year	Competition	Venue	Position	Event	Notes
Representing Colombia
1994	Ibero-American Championships	Mar del Plata, Argentina	1st	Hammer throw	55.70 m
1995	Pan American Games	Mar del Plata, Argentina	2nd	Hammer throw	56.14 m
1995	South American Championships	Manaus, Brazil	6th	Discus throw	39.70 m
1995	South American Championships	Manaus, Brazil	1st	Hammer throw	56.34 m
1996	Ibero-American Championships	Medellín, Colombia	1st	Hammer throw	57.76 m
1997	Central American and Caribbean Championships	San Juan, Puerto Rico	1st	Hammer throw	53.82 m
1997	South American Championships	Mar del Plata, Argentina	1st	Hammer throw	55.48 m
1998	Ibero-American Championships	Lisbon, Portugal	1st	Hammer throw	59.22 m
1998	Central American and Caribbean Games	Maracaibo, Venezuela	2nd	Hammer throw	57.69 m
1998	South American Games	Cuenca, Ecuador	1st	Discus throw	41.00 m
1998	South American Games	Cuenca, Ecuador	1st	Hammer throw	57.84 m
1999	South American Championships	Bogotá, Colombia	2nd	Hammer throw	58.26 m
2000	Ibero-American Championships	Rio de Janeiro, Brazil	4th	Hammer throw	56.37 m
2001	South American Championships	Manaus, Brazil	4th	Hammer throw	55.57 m
2002	Ibero-American Championships	Guatemala City, Guatemala	6th	Hammer throw	54.59 m
2002	Central American and Caribbean Games	San Salvador, El Salvador	4th	Hammer throw	55.29 m
2003	South American Championships	Barquisimeto, Venezuela	6th	Hammer throw	55.03 m
