= Bertha Sánchez =

Colombian long-distance runner

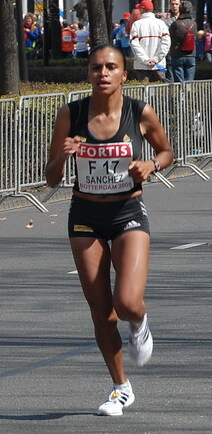
- Sánchez in the 2008 Rotterdam Marathon

Personal information
- Full name: Bertha Oliva Sánchez Rivera
- Born: November 4, 1978 (age 47) Betania, Antioquia, Colombia
- Height: 1.69 m (5 ft 7 in)
- Weight: 48 kg (106 lb)

Sport
- Country: Colombia
- Sport: Athletics

Achievements and titles
- Olympic finals: 1996 Summer Olympics
Medal record
Women's athletics
Representing Colombia
South American Games
Bronze medal – third place	1998 Cuenca	1500 m
Bolivarian Games
Gold medal – first place	2005 Armenia	5000 m
Silver medal – second place	2001 Ambato	1500 m
Silver medal – second place	2005 Armenia	10,000 m
Bronze medal – third place	2001 Ambato	3000 m steeplechase
South American Youth Championships
Gold medal – first place	1994 Cochabamba	1500 m
Gold medal – first place	1994 Cochabamba	3000 m
Silver medal – second place	1994 Cochabamba	800 m
Bronze medal – third place	1992 Santiago	3000 m
- Updated on 11 May 2013

Bertha Oliva Sánchez Rivera (born November 4, 1978) is a female long-distance runner from Colombia, who won several medals on continental level from the mid-1990s on.

== Career ==
She has won twice at the South American Cross Country Championships; first winning the long race in 2000, then winning the short race competition in 2002.

== Achievements ==
Year	Competition	Venue	Position	Event	Notes
Representing Colombia
1992	South American Youth Championships	Santiago, Chile	3rd	3000 m	10:03.63 min
1994	South American Youth Championships	Cochabamba, Bolivia	2nd	800 m	2:16.64 min A
1994	South American Youth Championships	Cochabamba, Bolivia	1st	1500 m	4:46.99 min A
1994	South American Youth Championships	Cochabamba, Bolivia	1st	3000 m	10:35.2 min A
1994	South American Youth Championships	Cochabamba, Bolivia	4th	4 × 400 m	4:11.45 min A
1995	South American Championships	Manaus, Brazil	6th	1500 m	4:30.89
1995	South American Championships	Manaus, Brazil	3rd	5000 m	16:49.58
1996	Ibero-American Championships	Medellín, Colombia	6th	1500 m	4:32.15
1998	Central American and Caribbean Games	Maracaibo, Venezuela	4th	1500 m	4:30.09
1998	Central American and Caribbean Games	Maracaibo, Venezuela	3rd	5000 m	16:51.89
1998	South American Games	Cuenca, Ecuador	3rd	1500 m	4:26.29
1999	South American Championships	Bogotá, Colombia	1st	1500 m	4:35.72 A
1999	South American Championships	Bogotá, Colombia	2nd	5000 m	17:02.89 A
1999	Pan American Games	Winnipeg, Canada	5th	1500 m	4:21.10
1999	Pan American Games	Winnipeg, Canada	2nd	5000 m	15:59.04
2001	Bolivarian Games	Ambato, Ecuador	2nd	1500 m	4:38.2 A
2001	Bolivarian Games	Ambato, Ecuador	3rd	3000 m stp	11:53.1 A
2002	Ibero-American Championships	Guatemala City, Guatemala	3rd	3000 m	9:34.99
2002	Ibero-American Championships	Guatemala City, Guatemala	4th	5000 m	17:00.36
2002	Central American and Caribbean Games	San Salvador, El Salvador	3rd	1500 m	4:27.75
2002	Central American and Caribbean Games	San Salvador, El Salvador	2nd	5000 m	16:39.23
2003	Pan American Games	Santo Domingo, Dominican Republic	3rd	10,000 m	33:56.17
2004	Ibero-American Championships	Huelva, Spain	6th	5000 m	16:47.99
2005	South American Championships	Cali, Colombia	1st	5000 m	16:47.03
2005	South American Championships	Cali, Colombia	1st	10,000 m	34:34.40
2005	Bolivarian Games	Armenia, Colombia	1st	5000 m	17:40.58 A
2005	Bolivarian Games	Armenia, Colombia	2nd	10,000 m	35:25.39 A
2006	Ibero-American Championships	Ponce, Puerto Rico	3rd	3000 m	9:19.04
2006	Ibero-American Championships	Ponce, Puerto Rico	1st	5000 m	16:10.32
2006	Central American and Caribbean Games	Cartagena, Colombia	1st	5000 m	16:17:13
2006	South American Championships	Tunja, Colombia	1st	5000 m	17:16.39
2006	South American Championships	Tunja, Colombia	1st	10,000 m	37:36.16
2006	South American Championships	Tunja, Colombia	1st	3000 m stp	10:48.44
2007	South American Championships	São Paulo, Brazil	3rd	5000 m	16:21.17
2007	South American Championships	São Paulo, Brazil	3rd	10,000 m	34:23.89
2007	Pan American Games	Rio de Janeiro, Brazil	6th	5000 m	15:49.97
2007	Pan American Games	Rio de Janeiro, Brazil	8th	10,000 m	34:13.25
2008	Central American and Caribbean Championships	Cali, Colombia	2nd	5000 m	16:43.82
2008	Central American and Caribbean Championships	Cali, Colombia	1st	10,000 m	35:16.36
2008	Olympic Games	Beijing, PR China	62nd	Marathon	2:47:02
2009	South American Championships	Lima, Peru	5th	5000 m	16:42.19
2009	South American Championships	Lima, Peru	5th	10,000 m	35:07.82
