= 1998 Ibero-American Championships in Athletics – Results =

These are the full results of the 1998 Ibero-American Championships in Athletics which took place on July 17–18, 1998 on Estádio Universitário in Lisbon, Portugal.

== Men's results ==
=== 100 meters ===
Heats – July 17
Wind:
Heat 1: -0.3 m/s, Heat 2: +1.4 m/s

| Rank | Heat | Name | Nationality | Time | Notes |
|---|---|---|---|---|---|
| 1 | 2 | Sebastián Keitel | Chile | 10.28 | Q |
| 2 | 1 | Carlos Gats | Argentina | 10.35 | Q |
| 3 | 1 | Édson Ribeiro | Brazil | 10.40 | Q |
| 4 | 2 | Cláudio Roberto Souza | Brazil | 10.42 | Q |
| 5 | 1 | Carlos Berlanga | Spain | 10.44 | Q |
| 5 | 2 | Oscar Meneses | Guatemala | 10.44 | Q |
| 7 | 2 | Frutos Feo | Spain | 10.45 | q |
| 8 | 1 | Mário Barbosa | Portugal | 10.47 | q |
| 9 | 2 | Amarildo Almeida | Guinea-Bissau | 10.56 | |
| 10 | 2 | Guillermo Cacián | Argentina | 10.57 | |
| 11 | 1 | Juan Pita | Cuba | 10.60 | |
| 12 | 1 | Carlos Villaseñor | Mexico | 10.65 | |
| 13 | 2 | Luís Cunha | Portugal | 10.68 | |
| 14 | 1 | José Chato | Mozambique | 11.15 | |

Final – July 17
Wind:
+1.0 m/s

| Rank | Name | Nationality | Time | Notes |
|---|---|---|---|---|
| 1st place, gold medalist(s) | Sebastián Keitel | Chile | 10.10 | =NR |
| 2nd place, silver medalist(s) | Édson Ribeiro | Brazil | 10.14 | |
| 3rd place, bronze medalist(s) | Carlos Gats | Argentina | 10.23 | NR |
| 4 | Carlos Berlanga | Spain | 10.36 | |
| 5 | Mário Barbosa | Portugal | 10.40 | |
| 6 | Cláudio Roberto Souza | Brazil | 10.44 | |
| 7 | Oscar Meneses | Guatemala | 10.52 | |
| 8 | Frutos Feo | Spain | 10.60 | |

Extra – July 17
Wind:
0.0 m/s

| Rank | Name | Nationality | Time | Notes |
|---|---|---|---|---|
| 1 | Diego Santos | Spain | 10.30 | |
| 2 | Tiago Ganço | Portugal | 10.66 | |
| 3 | Paulo Figueiredo | Portugal | 10.72 | |
| 4 | Evener Dueñas | Mexico | 10.85 | |
| 5 | César López | Mexico | 10.88 | |

=== 200 meters ===
Heats – July 18
Wind:
Heat 1: -1.2 m/s, Heat 2: -1.7 m/s

| Rank | Heat | Name | Nationality | Time | Notes |
|---|---|---|---|---|---|
| 1 | 1 | Sebastián Keitel | Chile | 20.92 | Q |
| 2 | 1 | Francisco Javier Navarro | Spain | 21.04 | Q |
| 3 | 2 | Carlos Gats | Argentina | 21.20 | Q |
| 4 | 2 | Gonzalo Corroto | Spain | 21.28 | Q |
| 5 | 1 | Édson Ribeiro | Brazil | 21.29 | Q |
| 6 | 2 | Robson da Silva | Brazil | 21.33 | Q |
| 7 | 1 | Vítor Jorge | Portugal | 21.41 | q |
| 8 | 1 | Guillermo Cacián | Argentina | 21.75 | q |
| 9 | 2 | Amarildo Almeida | Guinea-Bissau | 21.76 | |
| 10 | 2 | Mely Ollarves | Venezuela | 21.84 | |
| 11 | 1 | José Herrera | Colombia | 21.88 | |
| 12 | 1 | José Chato | Mozambique | 22.46 | |

Final – July 18
Wind:
+0.7 m/s

| Rank | Name | Nationality | Time | Notes |
|---|---|---|---|---|
| 1st place, gold medalist(s) | Sebastián Keitel | Chile | 20.16 | |
| 2nd place, silver medalist(s) | Carlos Gats | Argentina | 20.37 | NR |
| 3rd place, bronze medalist(s) | Édson Ribeiro | Brazil | 20.58 | |
| 4 | Francisco Javier Navarro | Spain | 20.74 | |
| 5 | Gonzalo Corroto | Spain | 20.99 | |
| 6 | Robson da Silva | Brazil | 21.08 | |
| 7 | Vítor Jorge | Portugal | 21.12 | |
| 8 | Guillermo Cacián | Argentina | 21.69 | |

=== 400 meters ===
Heats – July 18

| Rank | Heat | Name | Nationality | Time | Notes |
|---|---|---|---|---|---|
| 1 | 1 | Alejandro Cárdenas | Mexico | 46.00 | Q |
| 2 | 1 | Juan Pedro Toledo | Mexico | 46.07 | Q |
| 3 | 1 | David Canal | Spain | 46.14 | Q |
| 4 | 2 | Antonio Andrés | Spain | 47.26 | Q |
| 5 | 2 | Ricardo Roach | Chile | 47.81 | Q |
| 6 | 2 | Osiris Martínez | Cuba | 48.04 | Q |
| 7 | 1 | William Hernández | Venezuela | 48.05 | q |
| 8 | 2 | Rui Costa | Portugal | 48.63 | q |
| | 2 | Julio Rojas | Colombia | DQ | |

Final – July 18

| Rank | Name | Nationality | Time | Notes |
|---|---|---|---|---|
| 1st place, gold medalist(s) | Alejandro Cárdenas | Mexico | 45.04 | |
| 2nd place, silver medalist(s) | Juan Pedro Toledo | Mexico | 45.63 | |
| 3rd place, bronze medalist(s) | David Canal | Spain | 45.87 | |
| 4 | Antonio Andrés | Spain | 46.40 | |
| 5 | Ricardo Roach | Chile | 47.29 | |
| 6 | Osiris Martínez | Cuba | 47.57 | |
| 7 | William Hernández | Venezuela | 47.66 | |
| 8 | Rui Costa | Portugal | 47.94 | |

=== 800 meters ===
July 19

| Rank | Name | Nationality | Time | Notes |
|---|---|---|---|---|
| 1st place, gold medalist(s) | Flávio Godoy | Brazil | 1:50.05 | |
| 2nd place, silver medalist(s) | Roberto Parra | Spain | 1:50.19 | |
| 3rd place, bronze medalist(s) | Duarte Ponte | Portugal | 1:50.60 | |
| 4 | João Pires | Portugal | 1:50.73 | |
| 5 | Israel Domínguez | Spain | 1:50.81 | |
| 6 | John Chávez | Colombia | 1:50.86 | |
| 7 | Amilcar Leal | Mozambique | 1:51.83 | |
| 8 | Gustavo Aguirre | Argentina | 1:53.52 | |
| 9 | William Loque | Guinea-Bissau | 1:53.87 | |

=== 1500 meters ===
July 18

| Rank | Name | Nationality | Time | Notes |
|---|---|---|---|---|
| 1st place, gold medalist(s) | Luís Feiteira | Portugal | 3:40.63 | |
| 2nd place, silver medalist(s) | Pedro Antonio Esteso | Spain | 3:40.64 | |
| 3rd place, bronze medalist(s) | Hudson de Souza | Brazil | 3:41.14 | |
| 4 | Héctor Torres | Mexico | 3:41.14 | |
| 5 | Armando Monteiro | Portugal | 3:46.80 | |
| 6 | Manuel Moreno | Cape Verde | 4:10.21 | |
| 7 | Tiago Gomes | Guinea-Bissau | 4:20.08 | |
| | José Antonio Redolat | Spain | DNF | |

=== 5000 meters ===
July 19

| Rank | Name | Nationality | Time | Notes |
|---|---|---|---|---|
| 1st place, gold medalist(s) | António Pinto | Portugal | 13:34.34 | |
| 2nd place, silver medalist(s) | Pablo Olmedo | Mexico | 13:35.21 | |
| 3rd place, bronze medalist(s) | Eduardo Henriques | Portugal | 13:51.66 | |
| 4 | Néstor García | Uruguay | 13:55.12 | |
| 5 | Eduardo Vargas | Spain | 13:59.81 | |
| 6 | Juan Gutiérrez | Colombia | 14:03.50 | |
| 7 | Julio Valle | Mexico | 14:03.63 | |
| 8 | Jacinto López | Colombia | 14:18.01 | |
| 9 | Mauricio Díaz | Chile | 14:19.13 | |
| 10 | José Morales | Guatemala | 14:27.40 | |
| 11 | Franklin Tenorio | Ecuador | 14:41.02 | |
| 12 | Manuel Brito | Cape Verde | 15:51.40 | |
| 13 | Manuel Olímpio | Cape Verde | 16:12.00 | |

=== 10,000 meters ===
July 17

| Rank | Name | Nationality | Time | Notes |
|---|---|---|---|---|
| 1st place, gold medalist(s) | Antonio Silio | Argentina | 28:25.30 | |
| 2nd place, silver medalist(s) | Paulo Guerra | Portugal | 28:40.18 | |
| 3rd place, bronze medalist(s) | Alberto Maravilha | Portugal | 28:58.11 | |
| 4 | Alberto Juzdado | Spain | 29:10.59 | |
| 5 | Néstor García | Uruguay | 29:14.46 | |
| 6 | Franklin Tenorio | Ecuador | 29:22.12 | |
| 7 | Julio Valle | Mexico | 29:24.60 | |
| 8 | José Morales | Guatemala | 29:59.27 | |
| 9 | Juan Gutiérrez | Colombia | 30:17.39 | |
| 10 | António Zeferino | Cape Verde | 32:38.10 | |
| | Iván Gómez | Guatemala | DNF | |

=== 110 meters hurdles ===
July 18
Wind: +0.6 m/s

| Rank | Name | Nationality | Time | Notes |
|---|---|---|---|---|
| 1st place, gold medalist(s) | Erik Batte | Cuba | 13.54 | |
| 2nd place, silver medalist(s) | Francisco Javier López | Spain | 13.95 | |
| 3rd place, bronze medalist(s) | Hipólito Montesinos | Spain | 13.97 | |
| 4 | Márcio de Souza | Brazil | 14.13 | |
| 5 | Rui Palma | Portugal | 14.19 | |
| 6 | Pedro Rodrigues | Portugal | 14.37 | |

=== 400 meters hurdles ===
Heats – July 18

| Rank | Heat | Name | Nationality | Time | Notes |
|---|---|---|---|---|---|
| 1 | 1 | Carlos Silva | Portugal | 49.04 | Q |
| 2 | 1 | Eronilde de Araújo | Brazil | 49.58 | Q |
| 3 | 1 | Jaciel Zamora | Cuba | 50.03 | Q |
| 4 | 1 | Domingo Cordero | Puerto Rico | 50.03 | q |
| 5 | 1 | Oscar Juanz | Mexico | 50.60 | q |
| 6 | 2 | Emilio Valle | Cuba | 50.69 | Q |
| 7 | 1 | Llimy Rivas | Colombia | 50.72 | |
| 8 | 2 | Iñigo Monreal | Spain | 50.74 | Q |
| 9 | 2 | Alexander Mena | Colombia | 50.75 | Q |
| 10 | 2 | Carlos Zbinden | Chile | 50.80 | |
| 11 | 2 | Mário Reis | Portugal | 50.87 | |
| 12 | 2 | Edivaldo Monteiro | Guinea-Bissau | 50.95 | |
| 13 | 1 | William Loque | Guinea-Bissau | 52.71 | |
| 14 | 2 | José Moncada | Venezuela | 53.43 | |
| 15 | 1 | Arlindo Pinheiro | São Tomé and Príncipe | 53.70 | NR |

Final – July 19

| Rank | Name | Nationality | Time | Notes |
|---|---|---|---|---|
| 1st place, gold medalist(s) | Eronilde de Araújo | Brazil | 48.96 | |
| 2nd place, silver medalist(s) | Carlos Silva | Portugal | 49.08 | |
| 3rd place, bronze medalist(s) | Emilio Valle | Cuba | 50.08 | |
| 4 | Domingo Cordero | Puerto Rico | 50.28 | |
| 5 | Jaciel Zamora | Cuba | 50.48 | |
| 6 | Oscar Juanz | Mexico | 51.01 | |
| 7 | Alexander Mena | Colombia | 51.20 | |
| 8 | Iñigo Monreal | Spain | 51.52 | |

=== 3000 meters steeplechase ===
July 19

| Rank | Name | Nationality | Time | Notes |
|---|---|---|---|---|
| 1st place, gold medalist(s) | Luis Miguel Martín | Spain | 8:28.96 | |
| 2nd place, silver medalist(s) | Vítor Almeida | Portugal | 8:29.48 | |
| 3rd place, bronze medalist(s) | Néstor Nieves | Venezuela | 8:30.07 | |
| 4 | João Junqueira | Portugal | 8:30.64 | |
| 5 | Marco Cepeda | Spain | 8:33.42 | |
| 6 | Wander Moura | Brazil | 8:33.47 | |
| 7 | Salvador Miranda | Mexico | 8:36.24 | |
| 8 | Daniel Torres | Mexico | 8:40.67 | |

=== 4 x 100 meters relay ===
July 19

| Rank | Nation | Competitors | Time | Notes |
|---|---|---|---|---|
| 1st place, gold medalist(s) | Brazil | Arnaldo da Silva, Cláudio Roberto Souza, Édson Ribeiro, Robson da Silva | 39.82 | |
| 2nd place, silver medalist(s) | Mexico | Carlos Villaseñor, Juan Pedro Toledo, César López, Evener Dueñas | 40.49 | |
| | Spain | Frutos Feo, Francisco Javier Navarro, Diego Santos, Carlos Berlanga | DQ | |
| | Portugal | Tiago Ganço, Mário Barbosa, Paulo Figueiredo, Vítor Jorge | DQ | |

=== 4 x 400 meters relay ===
July 19

| Rank | Nation | Competitors | Time | Notes |
|---|---|---|---|---|
| 1st place, gold medalist(s) | Mexico | Raymundo Escalante, Juan Pedro Toledo, Oscar Juanz, Alejandro Cárdenas | 3:06.12 | |
| 2nd place, silver medalist(s) | Spain | Adrián Fernández, Antonio Andrés, Iñigo Monreal, David Canal | 3:08.05 | |
| 3rd place, bronze medalist(s) | Portugal | Rui Costa, Duarte Ponte, Paulo Fontes, Vítor Jorge | 3:08.46 | |
| 4 | Colombia | Alexander Mena, Llimy Rivas, José Herrera, Julio Rojas | 3:10.01 | |

=== 20 kilometers walk ===
July 17

| Rank | Name | Nationality | Time | Notes |
|---|---|---|---|---|
| 1st place, gold medalist(s) | Alejandro López | Mexico | 1:25:18 | |
| 2nd place, silver medalist(s) | Julio René Martínez | Guatemala | 1:26:25 | |
| 3rd place, bronze medalist(s) | Héctor Moreno | Colombia | 1:27:21 | |
| 4 | Fernando Vázquez | Spain | 1:27:42 | |
| 5 | João Vieira | Portugal | 1:33:46 | |
| 6 | Pedro Castro | Colombia | 1:38:54 | |
| | Sérgio Vieira | Portugal | DNF | |
| | Joel Sánchez | Mexico | DNF | |
| | Sérgio Galdino | Brazil | DNF | |
| | José Alejandro Cambil | Spain | DQ | |

=== High jump ===
July 19

| Rank | Name | Nationality | 1.95 | 1.99 | 2.03 | 2.07 | 2.10 | 2.13 | 2.16 | 2.18 | 2.20 | 2.22 | 2.24 | Result | Notes |
|---|---|---|---|---|---|---|---|---|---|---|---|---|---|---|---|
| 1st place, gold medalist(s) | Ignacio Pérez | Spain | – | – | – | – | o | – | o | – | o | – | xxx | 2.20 | |
| 2nd place, silver medalist(s) | Javier Bermejo | Spain | – | – | o | – | o | – | o | – | xo | x– | xx | 2.20 | |
| 3rd place, bronze medalist(s) | Gilmar Mayo | Colombia | – | – | – | – | – | o | – | o | – | – | xxx | 2.18 | |
| 4 | Erasmo Jara | Argentina | – | – | – | o | – | xo | – | xxx | | | | 2.13 | |
| 5 | César Ballesteros | Mexico | – | – | o | o | – | xxx | | | | | | 2.07 | |
| 5 | Felipe Apablaza | Chile | – | – | o | o | – | xxx | | | | | | 2.07 | |
| 7 | Pedro Raposo | Portugal | o | – | xo | xxx | | | | | | | | 2.03 | |
| 8 | Jonas Mattes | Portugal | – | o | xxx | | | | | | | | | 1.99 | |

=== Pole vault ===
July 18

| Rank | Name | Nationality | 4.70 | 4.80 | 4.90 | 5.00 | 5.10 | 5.20 | 5.30 | 5.40 | 5.55 | 5.60 | 5.65 | 5.70 | Result | Notes |
|---|---|---|---|---|---|---|---|---|---|---|---|---|---|---|---|---|
| 1st place, gold medalist(s) | Montxu Miranda | Spain | – | – | – | – | – | o | – | xxo | – | xo | – | xxx | 5.60 | CR |
| 2nd place, silver medalist(s) | Nuno Fernandes | Portugal | – | – | – | – | – | xo | – | o | xo | – | xxx | | 5.55 | |
| 3rd place, bronze medalist(s) | Javier García | Spain | – | – | – | – | – | – | – | o | xxx | | | | 5.40 | |
| 4 | Edgar Díaz | Puerto Rico | – | – | – | – | – | – | xo | xxx | | | | | 5.30 | |
| 5 | Ricardo Diez | Venezuela | – | – | – | xo | – | o | xo | xxx | | | | | 5.30 | |
| 6 | João André | Portugal | – | o | – | o | xxx | | | | | | | | 5.00 | |
| 7 | Cristián Aspillaga | Chile | o | o | xo | xo | xxx | | | | | | | | 5.00 | |
| 8 | Luis Hidalgo | Venezuela | – | – | xo | xxx | | | | | | | | | 4.90 | |
| 9 | Oscar Veit | Argentina | – | o | – | xxx | | | | | | | | | 4.80 | |
| 9 | Gustavo Render | Brazil | – | o | – | xxx | | | | | | | | | 4.80 | |
| | Jorge Tienda | Mexico | – | – | – | xxx | | | | | | | | | NM | |

=== Long jump ===
July 17

| Rank | Name | Nationality | #1 | #2 | #3 | #4 | #5 | #6 | Result | Notes |
|---|---|---|---|---|---|---|---|---|---|---|
| 1st place, gold medalist(s) | Yago Lamela | Spain | 7.59 | 8.12 | 7.73 | – | x | 6.63w | 8.12 | |
| 2nd place, silver medalist(s) | Raúl Fernández | Spain | 8.05 | – | x | – | 7.62 | 7.82 | 8.05 | |
| 3rd place, bronze medalist(s) | Lewis Asprilla | Colombia | x | 7.55 | 7.52 | 7.88 | 7.45 | 7.30 | 7.88 | |
| 4 | Carlos Calado | Portugal | 7.81 | x | 7.66 | – | – | – | 7.81 | |
| 5 | Luis Felipe Méliz | Cuba | 7.64 | 7.64 | 7.70 | 7.73 | 7.66 | 7.73 | 7.73 | |
| 6 | Esteban Copland | Venezuela | x | 7.52 | 7.66 | 7.49 | 7.35 | x | 7.66 | |
| 7 | Iván Salcedo | Mexico | 7.40 | 7.27w | x | 7.03 | 7.46 | 7.63 | 7.63 | |
| 8 | Antônio da Costa | Brazil | 7.40 | x | x | x | x | x | 7.58 | |
| 9 | Carlos Castelbranco | Portugal | x | x | 7.16 | | | | 7.16 | |

=== Triple jump ===
July 19

| Rank | Name | Nationality | #1 | #2 | #3 | #4 | #5 | #6 | Result | Notes |
|---|---|---|---|---|---|---|---|---|---|---|
| 1st place, gold medalist(s) | Iván Salcedo | Mexico | 15.44 | x | 15.91 | 16.36 | x | x | 16.36 | |
| 2nd place, silver medalist(s) | Raúl Chapado | Spain | 15.90 | x | 15.98 | 16.08 | x | 16.16 | 16.16 | |
| 3rd place, bronze medalist(s) | Antônio da Costa | Brazil | x | x | 14.72 | 15.75 | 16.09 | 15.87 | 16.09 | |
| 4 | Eduardo Pérez | Spain | 15.38 | 15.60 | 15.05 | 15.21 | x | 15.21 | 15.60 | |
| 5 | Antônio Santos | Angola | 15.02 | x | x | x | 15.49 | 13.49 | 15.49 | |
| 6 | Eduardo Martingo | Portugal | 14.84 | 14.95 | 15.37 | 15.26 | x | 14.98 | 15.37 | |

=== Shot put ===
July 18

| Rank | Name | Nationality | #1 | #2 | #3 | #4 | #5 | #6 | Result | Notes |
|---|---|---|---|---|---|---|---|---|---|---|
| 1st place, gold medalist(s) | Manuel Martínez | Spain | 19.47 | x | x | 19.47 | x | 19.23 | 19.47 | |
| 2nd place, silver medalist(s) | Fernando Alves | Portugal | 19.09 | 19.13 | 18.85 | 18.57 | x | 19.09 | 19.13 | |
| 3rd place, bronze medalist(s) | José Luis Martínez | Spain | 17.94 | 17.70 | 17.68 | 17.69 | 18.53 | 18.56 | 18.56 | |
| 4 | Yojer Medina | Venezuela | 18.15 | x | 18.20 | 18.31 | 18.07 | x | 18.31 | |
| 5 | Orlando Ibarra | Colombia | 17.26 | 17.02 | x | x | 16.62 | 17.38 | 17.38 | |
| 6 | Édson Miguel | Brazil | 16.28 | 16.53 | x | 16.90 | 17.02 | x | 17.02 | |
| 7 | Marco Antonio Verni | Chile | x | 16.54 | 16.81 | x | 16.81 | x | 16.81 | |
| 8 | Herédio Costa | Portugal | 16.26 | 16.52 | 16.08 | x | 16.62 | x | 16.62 | |
| 9 | Jhonny Rodríguez | Colombia | x | x | 16.40 | | | | 16.40 | |
| 10 | Ronny Jiménez | Venezuela | 16.26 | 16.38 | x | | | | 16.38 | |
| 11 | Jaime Comandari | El Salvador | 16.05 | x | 15.66 | | | | 16.05 | |
| 12 | Gerardo Maurer | Chile | 15.36 | 16.02 | 15.44 | | | | 16.02 | |

=== Discus throw ===
July 17

| Rank | Name | Nationality | #1 | #2 | #3 | #4 | #5 | #6 | Result | Notes |
|---|---|---|---|---|---|---|---|---|---|---|
| 1st place, gold medalist(s) | Alexis Elizalde | Cuba | x | 60.37 | 58.26 | 60.44 | 59.75 | 61.45 | 61.45 | |
| 2nd place, silver medalist(s) | Paulo Bernardo | Portugal | 56.35 | 51.80 | x | 57.48 | x | 60.19 | 60.19 | |
| 3rd place, bronze medalist(s) | Marcelo Pugliese | Argentina | 54.63 | 56.95 | 54.85 | 54.82 | 58.10 | 58.19 | 58.19 | |
| 4 | Julio Piñero | Argentina | x | 46.06 | 55.50 | 56.47 | x | 56.51 | 56.51 | |
| 5 | Jesús Camblor | Spain | x | 47.54 | x | 53.47 | 54.34 | x | 54.34 | |
| 6 | José Luis Valencia | Spain | 50.15 | 53.47 | 53.22 | 51.72 | x | 51.61 | 53.47 | |
| 7 | Herédio Costa | Portugal | 51.10 | x | 51.85 | 51.08 | x | 48.79 | 51.85 | |
| 8 | Julián Angulo | Colombia | x | 47.18 | 48.79 | 51.05 | 49.95 | 50.53 | 51.05 | |

=== Hammer throw ===
July 18

| Rank | Name | Nationality | #1 | #2 | #3 | #4 | #5 | #6 | Result | Notes |
|---|---|---|---|---|---|---|---|---|---|---|
| 1st place, gold medalist(s) | Alberto Sánchez | Cuba | 76.18 | x | x | x | 70.62 | 75.69 | 76.18 | CR |
| 2nd place, silver medalist(s) | Vítor Costa | Portugal | 70.06 | 70.96 | 69.13 | 70.14 | x | 71.17 | 71.17 | |
| 3rd place, bronze medalist(s) | Juan Ignacio Cerra | Argentina | 69.72 | 69.11 | 68.65 | x | 69.84 | 70.83 | 70.83 | |
| 4 | José Manuel Pérez | Spain | x | x | 60.01 | 70.27 | x | 70.43 | 70.43 | |
| 5 | Adrián Marzo | Argentina | 66.53 | 67.50 | 67.41 | 66.94 | x | 66.96 | 67.50 | |
| 6 | Eduardo Acuña | Peru | 61.45 | 62.57 | 62.35 | 58.51 | x | 59.94 | 62.57 | |
| 7 | António Peixoto | Portugal | 61.13 | 60.75 | 61.37 | 61.86 | 61.25 | 60.43 | 61.86 | |
| 8 | José Llano | Chile | x | 56.11 | 61.85 | x | x | 60.31 | 61.85 | |
| 9 | Mário Leme | Brazil | 58.98 | 54.35 | 59.05 | | | | 59.05 | |

=== Javelin throw ===
July 19

| Rank | Name | Nationality | #1 | #2 | #3 | #4 | #5 | #6 | Result | Notes |
|---|---|---|---|---|---|---|---|---|---|---|
| 1st place, gold medalist(s) | Isbel Luaces | Cuba | 77.52 | 78.09 | 75.44 | 78.72 | x | 77.55 | 78.72 | |
| 2nd place, silver medalist(s) | Nery Kennedy | Paraguay | x | 76.16 | x | 71.46 | x | 75.59 | 76.16 | |
| 3rd place, bronze medalist(s) | Rodrigo Zelaya | Chile | 74.54 | 71.91 | x | x | – | 70.37 | 74.54 | |
| 4 | Luiz Fernando da Silva | Brazil | 72.82 | 70.82 | 68.37 | x | x | x | 72.82 | |
| 5 | Alejandro García | Spain | 59.26 | 60.68 | 69.07 | x | 66.84 | 65.78 | 69.07 | |
| 6 | Edgar Baumann | Paraguay | 65.80 | 66.37 | 68.55 | 65.74 | 66.43 | x | 68.55 | |
| 7 | Edwin Cuesta | Venezuela | 65.57 | 66.87 | 67.25 | x | x | x | 67.25 | |
| 8 | Carlos Cunha | Portugal | 64.47 | 59.47 | 63.78 | 62.59 | 58.82 | x | 64.47 | |
| 9 | João Reis | Portugal | 64.20 | 62.52 | 64.16 | | | | 64.20 | |
| 10 | Fernando Palomo | El Salvador | 62.30 | x | x | | | | 62.30 | |

=== Decathlon ===
July 17–18

The highest mark recorded in each event is highlighted in yellow

| Rank | Athlete | Nationality | 100m | LJ | SP | HJ | 400m | 110m H | DT | PV | JT | 1500m | Points | Notes |
|---|---|---|---|---|---|---|---|---|---|---|---|---|---|---|
| 1st place, gold medalist(s) | Rubén Delgado | Spain | 11.07 | 7.13 | 12.92 | 1.91 | 49.92 | 15.15 | 40.03 | 4.10 | 48.21 | 4:37.06 | 7295 | |
| 2nd place, silver medalist(s) | Santiago Lorenzo | Argentina | 11.23 | 6.62 | 12.35 | 1.85 | 48.96 | 15.52 | 36.09 | 4.40 | 56.17 | 4:37.58 | 7177 | |
| 3rd place, bronze medalist(s) | José de Assis | Brazil | 11.09 | 6.21 | 12.86 | 1.85 | 50.11 | 14.91 | 42.21 | 4.00 | 55.15 | 4:45.03 | 7113 | |
| 4 | Diógenes Estévez | Venezuela | 11.21 | 6.65 | 12.93 | 1.82 | 50.38 | 15.48 | 38.42 | 3.80 | 51.30 | 4:32.26 | 6975 | |
| 5 | Pedro Veloso | Portugal | 11.58 | 6.61 | 11.56 | 1.97 | 51.52 | 16.35 | 33.36 | 4.10 | 45.85 | 4:47.78 | 6590 | |

== Women's results ==
=== 100 meters ===
Heats – July 17
Wind:
Heat 1: +0.1 m/s, Heat 2: +1.7 m/s

| Rank | Heat | Name | Nationality | Time | Notes |
|---|---|---|---|---|---|
| 1 | 2 | Liliana Allen | Mexico | 11.26 | Q |
| 2 | 2 | Lucrécia Jardim | Portugal | 11.42 | Q |
| 3 | 1 | Kátia Regina Santos | Brazil | 11.59 | Q |
| 3 | 2 | Carmen Blay | Spain | 11.59 | Q |
| 5 | 1 | Mirtha Brock | Colombia | 11.63 | Q |
| 6 | 1 | Severina Cravid | Portugal | 11.63 | Q |
| 7 | 2 | Lisette Rondón | Chile | 11.65 | q |
| 8 | 2 | Sandra Borrero | Colombia | 11.68 | q |
| 9 | 1 | Elena Córcoles | Spain | 11.73 | |
| 10 | 1 | Elisa Cossa | Mozambique | 12.16 | |

Final – July 17
Wind:
0.0 m/s

| Rank | Name | Nationality | Time | Notes |
|---|---|---|---|---|
| 1st place, gold medalist(s) | Liliana Allen | Mexico | 11.32 | |
| 2nd place, silver medalist(s) | Lucrécia Jardim | Portugal | 11.38 | |
| 3rd place, bronze medalist(s) | Kátia Regina Santos | Brazil | 11.62 | |
| 4 | Carmen Blay | Spain | 11.65 | |
| 5 | Mirtha Brock | Colombia | 11.72 | |
| 6 | Sandra Borrero | Colombia | 11.75 | |
| 7 | Severina Cravid | Portugal | 11.77 | |
| 8 | Lisette Rondón | Chile | 11.82 | |

Extra – July 17
Wind:
0.0 m/s

| Rank | Name | Nationality | Time | Notes |
|---|---|---|---|---|
| 1 | Arantxa Iglesias | Spain | 11.86 | |
| 2 | Cristina Regalo | Portugal | 12.01 | |

=== 200 meters ===
Heats – July 18
Wind:
Heat 1: +1.0 m/s, Heat 2: -0.5 m/s

| Rank | Heat | Name | Nationality | Time | Notes |
|---|---|---|---|---|---|
| 1 | 2 | Lucrécia Jardim | Portugal | 23.63 | Q |
| 2 | 1 | Liliana Allen | Mexico | 23.72 | Q |
| 3 | 2 | Julia Duporty | Cuba | 23.74 | Q |
| 4 | 1 | Elena Córcoles | Spain | 23.85 | Q |
| 5 | 2 | Mirtha Brock | Colombia | 23.95 | Q |
| 6 | 1 | Patricia Rodríguez | Colombia | 23.97 | Q |
| 7 | 1 | Lisette Rondón | Chile | 24.47 | q |
| 8 | 2 | Kátia Regina Santos | Brazil | 24.57 | q |
| 9 | 2 | Susana Martín | Spain | 24.59 | |
| 10 | 2 | Paula Osorio | Chile | 24.81 | |
| 11 | 2 | Marcela Sarabia | Mexico | 24.90 | |
| 12 | 1 | Sandra Reátegui | Peru | 24.93 | |

Final – July 18
Wind:
+0.7 m/s

| Rank | Name | Nationality | Time | Notes |
|---|---|---|---|---|
| 1st place, gold medalist(s) | Lucrécia Jardim | Portugal | 23.22 | |
| 2nd place, silver medalist(s) | Liliana Allen | Mexico | 23.29 | |
| 3rd place, bronze medalist(s) | Julia Duporty | Cuba | 23.52 | |
| 4 | Mirtha Brock | Colombia | 23.76 | |
| 5 | Patricia Rodríguez | Colombia | 23.83 | |
| 6 | Elena Córcoles | Spain | 23.84 | |
| 7 | Kátia Regina Santos | Brazil | 24.16 | |
| | Lisette Rondón | Chile | DNS | |

=== 400 meters ===
Heats – July 17

| Rank | Heat | Name | Nationality | Time | Notes |
|---|---|---|---|---|---|
| 1 | 1 | Ana Guevara | Mexico | 52.13 | Q |
| 2 | 2 | Norfalia Carabalí | Colombia | 52.44 | Q |
| 3 | 1 | Maria Figueirêdo | Brazil | 52.95 | Q |
| 4 | 1 | Carmo Tavares | Portugal | 52.99 | Q |
| 5 | 2 | Yudalis Díaz | Cuba | 53.37 | Q |
| 6 | 2 | Mayra González | Mexico | 54.01 | Q |
| 7 | 1 | Miriam Bravo | Spain | 54.42 | q |
| 8 | 2 | Natalia Moura | Portugal | 54.57 | q |
| 9 | 2 | Lissette Ferri | Spain | 54.73 | |

Final – July 18

| Rank | Name | Nationality | Time | Notes |
|---|---|---|---|---|
| 1st place, gold medalist(s) | Ana Guevara | Mexico | 50.65 | |
| 2nd place, silver medalist(s) | Norfalia Carabalí | Colombia | 51.95 | |
| 3rd place, bronze medalist(s) | Yudalis Díaz | Cuba | 52.49 | |
| 4 | Maria Figueirêdo | Brazil | 52.62 | |
| 5 | Carmo Tavares | Portugal | 52.66 | |
| 6 | Mayra González | Mexico | 53.38 | |
| 7 | Miriam Bravo | Spain | 54.77 | |
| 8 | Natalia Moura | Portugal | 54.90 | |

=== 800 meters ===
July 19

| Rank | Name | Nationality | Time | Notes |
|---|---|---|---|---|
| 1st place, gold medalist(s) | Ana Amelia Menéndez | Spain | 2:01.32 | |
| 2nd place, silver medalist(s) | Ana Guevara | Mexico | 2:01.55 | |
| 3rd place, bronze medalist(s) | Pilar Barreiro | Spain | 2:03.12 | |
| 4 | Nédia Semedo | Portugal | 2:05.98 | |
| 5 | Celia dos Santos | Brazil | 2:06.75 | |
| 6 | Janeth Lucumí | Colombia | 2:08.26 | |
| 7 | Susana Cabral | Portugal | 2:12.64 | |

=== 1500 meters ===
July 18

| Rank | Name | Nationality | Time | Notes |
|---|---|---|---|---|
| 1st place, gold medalist(s) | Carla Sacramento | Portugal | 4:17.43 | |
| 2nd place, silver medalist(s) | Nuria Fernández | Spain | 4:20.20 | |
| 3rd place, bronze medalist(s) | Janeth Caizalitín | Ecuador | 4:20.38 | |
| 4 | Vanda Ribeiro | Portugal | 4:22.55 | |
| 5 | Célia dos Santos | Brazil | 4:24.32 | |
| 6 | Mabel Arrúa | Argentina | 4:24.41 | |
| 7 | Clara Morales | Chile | 4:25.38 | |
| | Rocío Rodríguez | Spain | DNF | |
| | Rosa Mila Ibarra | Colombia | DNF | |

=== 5000 meters ===
July 17

| Rank | Name | Nationality | Time | Notes |
|---|---|---|---|---|
| 1st place, gold medalist(s) | Estíbaliz Urrutia | Spain | 16:09.68 | |
| 2nd place, silver medalist(s) | Nora Rocha | Mexico | 16:10.36 | |
| 3rd place, bronze medalist(s) | Amaia Piedra | Spain | 16:12.09 | |
| 4 | Albertina Dias | Portugal | 16:15.20 | |
| 5 | Ana Dias | Portugal | 16:18.48 | |
| 6 | Janeth Caizalitín | Ecuador | 16:25.76 | |
| 7 | Marina Bastos | Portugal | 16:31.38 | |
| 8 | Rosa Mila Ibarra | Colombia | 17:07.30 | |

=== 10,000 meters ===
July 18

| Rank | Name | Nationality | Time | Notes |
|---|---|---|---|---|
| 1st place, gold medalist(s) | María Luisa Larraga | Spain | 32:49.80 | |
| 2nd place, silver medalist(s) | Helena Sampaio | Portugal | 33:07.80 | |
| 3rd place, bronze medalist(s) | Manuela Machado | Portugal | 33:14.60 | |

=== 100 meters hurdles ===
July 17
Wind: +2.0 m/s

| Rank | Name | Nationality | Time | Notes |
|---|---|---|---|---|
| 1st place, gold medalist(s) | María José Mardomingo | Spain | 13.27 | |
| 2nd place, silver medalist(s) | Verónica Depaoli | Argentina | 13.46 | |
| 3rd place, bronze medalist(s) | Jacqueline Taváres | Mexico | 13.56 | |
| 4 | Sandra Barreiro | Portugal | 13.57 | |
| 5 | Sandra Turpin | Portugal | 13.58 | |
| 6 | Maurren Maggi | Brazil | 13.64 | |

=== 400 meters hurdles ===
July 18

| Rank | Name | Nationality | Time | Notes |
|---|---|---|---|---|
| 1st place, gold medalist(s) | Eva Paniagua | Spain | 57.35 | |
| 2nd place, silver medalist(s) | Esther Lahoz | Spain | 57.40 | PB |
| 3rd place, bronze medalist(s) | Flor Robledo | Colombia | 58.22 | |
| 4 | Jupira da Graça | Brazil | 58.92 | |
| 5 | Maria José Valamatos | Portugal | 1:00.34 | |
| 6 | Ana Costa | Portugal | 1:02.46 | |

=== 4 x 100 meters relay ===
July 19

| Rank | Nation | Competitors | Time | Notes |
|---|---|---|---|---|
| 1st place, gold medalist(s) | Spain | Carmen Blay, Elena Córcoles, Arantxa Iglesias, Susana Martín | 44.54 | |
| 2nd place, silver medalist(s) | Portugal | Carmo Tavares, Natalia Moura, Lucrécia Jardim, Severina Cravid | 44.75 | |
| | Colombia | Mirtha Brock, Ximena Restrepo, Patricia Rodríguez, Sandra Borrero | DNF | |

=== 4 x 400 meters relay ===
July 19

| Rank | Nation | Competitors | Time | Notes |
|---|---|---|---|---|
| 1st place, gold medalist(s) | Mexico | María Angeles Pantoja, Marcela Sarabia, Mayra González, Ana Guevara | 3:33.41 | |
| 2nd place, silver medalist(s) | Colombia | Flor Robledo, Ximena Restrepo, Patricia Rodríguez, Norfalia Carabalí | 3:33.69 | |
| 3rd place, bronze medalist(s) | Spain | Esther Lahoz, Yolanda Reyes, Lisette Ferri, Miriam Bravo | 3:33.97 | |
| 4 | Cuba | Zulia Calatayud, Julia Duporty, Yudalis Díaz, Idalmis Bonne | 3:34.46 | |
| 5 | Portugal | Severina Cravid, Natalia Moura, Sandra Teixeira, Carmo Tavares | 3:39.27 | |

=== 10,000 meters walk ===
July 18

| Rank | Name | Nationality | Time | Notes |
|---|---|---|---|---|
| 1st place, gold medalist(s) | Eva Pérez | Spain | 47:14.49 | |
| 2nd place, silver medalist(s) | Geovana Irusta | Bolivia | 47:20.26 | |
| 3rd place, bronze medalist(s) | Rosario Sánchez | Mexico | 47:36.10 | |
| 4 | Teresa Linares | Spain | 48:07.34 | |
| 5 | Ivis Martínez | El Salvador | 48:22.47 | |
| 6 | Isilda Gonçalves | Portugal | 48:49.10 | |
| 7 | Victoria Palacios | Mexico | 49:10.27 | |
| 8 | Gianetti Bonfim | Brazil | 50:52.71 | |
| 9 | Sofia Avoila | Portugal | 51:57.78 | |
| 10 | Hamida Mabunda | Mozambique | 1:13:25.38 | |

=== High jump ===
July 18

| Rank | Name | Nationality | 1.60 | 1.64 | 1.68 | 1.72 | 1.75 | 1.78 | 1.81 | 1.83 | 1.85 | Result | Notes |
|---|---|---|---|---|---|---|---|---|---|---|---|---|---|
| 1st place, gold medalist(s) | María del Mar Martínez | Spain | – | – | o | – | o | o | o | o | xxx | 1.83 | |
| 2nd place, silver medalist(s) | Solange Witteveen | Argentina | – | – | – | o | o | o | xo | xo | xxx | 1.83 | |
| 3rd place, bronze medalist(s) | Marta Mendía | Spain | – | – | o | – | o | o | o | xxx | | 1.81 | |
| 4 | Romary Rifka | Mexico | – | – | – | – | o | xo | xo | xxx | | 1.81 | |
| 5 | Luciane Dambacher | Brazil | – | – | o | o | o | xxx | | | | 1.75 | |
| 6 | Enezenaide Gomes | São Tomé and Príncipe | – | o | o | o | xo | xxx | | | | 1.75 | |
| 6 | Sónia Machado | Portugal | o | o | o | o | xo | xxx | | | | 1.75 | |
| 8 | Sónia Carvalho | Portugal | o | o | o | xxo | xxx | | | | | 1.72 | |
| 9 | Analía Santos | Argentina | – | o | xo | xxx | | | | | | 1.68 | |
| 10 | Cristina Fink | Mexico | – | o | xxo | xxx | | | | | | 1.68 | |

=== Pole vault ===
July 17

| Rank | Name | Nationality | 3.20 | 3.30 | 3.40 | 3.50 | 3.55 | 3.60 | 3.65 | 3.70 | 3.85 | 3.95 | 4.00 | 4.05 | Result | Notes |
|---|---|---|---|---|---|---|---|---|---|---|---|---|---|---|---|---|
| 1st place, gold medalist(s) | Dana Cervantes | Spain | – | – | – | – | – | – | – | o | o | o | – | xxx | 3.95 | CR |
| 2nd place, silver medalist(s) | Alejandra García | Argentina | – | – | – | – | – | xo | o | – | o | xo | xx– | x | 3.95 | CR |
| 3rd place, bronze medalist(s) | Déborah Gyurcsek | Uruguay | – | – | – | xxo | xo | xxx | | | | | | | 3.55 | |
| 4 | Alejandra Meza | Mexico | – | – | xo | o | – | xxx | | | | | | | 3.50 | |
| 5 | Lorena Espinoza | Mexico | – | – | xxo | xo | – | xxx | | | | | | | 3.50 | |
| 5 | Patricia Giacomussi | Brazil | o | o | xxo | xo | xxx | | | | | | | | 3.50 | |
| 5 | Marisa Vieira | Portugal | xxo | o | o | xo | xxx | | | | | | | | 3.50 | |
| 8 | Elisabete Tavares | Portugal | o | – | o | xxx | | | | | | | | | 3.40 | |

=== Long jump ===
July 18

| Rank | Name | Nationality | #1 | #2 | #3 | #4 | #5 | #6 | Result | Notes |
|---|---|---|---|---|---|---|---|---|---|---|
| 1st place, gold medalist(s) | Andrea Ávila | Argentina | 6.41 | 6.34 | 6.41 | 6.41 | 6.32 | 6.41 | 6.41 | |
| 2nd place, silver medalist(s) | Maria de Souza | Brazil | x | 6.32 | x | x | 6.38 | 6.33 | 6.38 | |
| 3rd place, bronze medalist(s) | Maurren Maggi | Brazil | 5.90 | 6.20 | x | 6.00 | 6.05w | 6.25 | 6.25 | |
| 4 | Sandra Turpin | Portugal | 6.18 | 6.15 | 6.16 | x | 6.21 | x | 6.21 | |
| 5 | Carlota Castrejana | Spain | x | 6.09 | 5.90 | 5.89 | 5.81 | 5.84 | 6.09 | |
| 6 | Nathaniel Gómez | Venezuela | x | 5.81 | 5.80 | 5.76 | 5.91 | x | 5.91 | |
| 7 | Elisa Cossa | Mozambique | 5.09 | 5.74 | 5.82 | 5.54 | 5.67 | 5.38 | 5.82 | |

=== Triple jump ===
July 17

| Rank | Name | Nationality | #1 | #2 | #3 | #4 | #5 | #6 | Result | Notes |
|---|---|---|---|---|---|---|---|---|---|---|
| 1st place, gold medalist(s) | Yamilé Aldama | Cuba | 13.57 | 13.79 | 14.07 | x | x | x | 14.07 | |
| 2nd place, silver medalist(s) | Carlota Castrejana | Spain | 13.07 | 13.24 | 13.27 | 13.58 | 13.55 | x | 13.58 | |
| 3rd place, bronze medalist(s) | Maria de Souza | Brazil | 12.80 | 13.33 | 13.35 | x | 13.38 | 13.44 | 13.44 | |
| 4 | Andrea Ávila | Argentina | 13.08 | x | 12.99 | x | 13.36 | 13.24 | 13.36 | |
| 5 | Yaquelín Iglesias | Cuba | 12.21 | 12.86 | 12.86 | 12.82w | 13.19 | 12.93 | 13.19 | |
| 6 | Cristina Morujão | Portugal | 12.27 | x | 12.70 | 13.07 | x | x | 13.07 | |
| 7 | Claudia Gameiro | Portugal | 11.91 | 12.12 | 12.20 | 12.09 | x | x | 12.20 | |

=== Shot put ===
July 19

| Rank | Name | Nationality | #1 | #2 | #3 | #4 | #5 | #6 | Result | Notes |
|---|---|---|---|---|---|---|---|---|---|---|
| 1st place, gold medalist(s) | Elisângela Adriano | Brazil | 18.11 | 18.38 | x | x | 18.02 | x | 18.38 | |
| 2nd place, silver medalist(s) | Margarita Ramos | Spain | 17.08 | 17.47 | 17.32 | x | 16.91 | x | 17.47 | |
| 3rd place, bronze medalist(s) | Teresa Machado | Portugal | 15.85 | 15.84 | x | 15.87 | 16.15 | x | 16.15 | |
| 4 | Sónia Graçio | Portugal | 13.40 | 13.47 | x | 13.26 | 13.41 | x | 13.47 | |

=== Discus throw ===
July 18

| Rank | Name | Nationality | #1 | #2 | #3 | #4 | #5 | #6 | Result | Notes |
|---|---|---|---|---|---|---|---|---|---|---|
| 1st place, gold medalist(s) | Teresa Machado | Portugal | 61.67 | 59.98 | 61.65 | x | 58.82 | 60.65 | 61.67 | |
| 2nd place, silver medalist(s) | Elisângela Adriano | Brazil | 57.17 | x | 56.95 | x | 58.94 | x | 58.94 | |
| 3rd place, bronze medalist(s) | Rita Lora | Spain | 54.74 | x | 52.71 | x | 56.92 | x | 56.92 | |
| 4 | Ana Fernández | Cuba | 46.78 | 50.51 | 53.73 | 54.58 | x | 51.50 | 54.58 | |
| 5 | Carmen Solé | Spain | 52.27 | 53.36 | x | 49.44 | x | x | 53.36 | |
| 6 | Cristina Araújo | Portugal | 38.77 | 41.65 | x | x | 39.89 | 40.61 | 41.65 | |

=== Hammer throw ===
July 17

| Rank | Name | Nationality | #1 | #2 | #3 | #4 | #5 | #6 | Result | Notes |
|---|---|---|---|---|---|---|---|---|---|---|
| 1st place, gold medalist(s) | María Eugenia Villamizar | Colombia | 59.22 | 58.15 | 57.22 | 56.93 | 55.36 | 55.27 | 59.22 | |
| 2nd place, silver medalist(s) | Yipsi Moreno | Cuba | 50.84 | 56.00 | x | 57.97 | 52.75 | 55.98 | 57.97 | |
| 3rd place, bronze medalist(s) | Violeta Guzmán | Mexico | 56.55 | 57.04 | x | 55.75 | x | x | 57.04 | |
| 4 | Karina Moya | Argentina | 47.54 | 50.84 | 55.88 | 50.43 | 55.37 | 53.55 | 55.88 | |
| 5 | Yunaika Crawford | Cuba | 52.59 | 48.34 | x | 43.33 | 52.08 | 55.80 | 55.80 | |
| 6 | Dolores Pedrares | Spain | x | 51.82 | 54.78 | x | 52.85 | 54.02 | 54.78 | |
| 7 | Nancy Guillén | El Salvador | 53.98 | x | 51.82 | x | 53.29 | x | 53.98 | |
| 8 | Sónia Alves | Portugal | 52.89 | x | x | x | x | 53.92 | 53.92 | |
| 9 | Susana Regüela | Spain | x | 48.91 | 51.63 | | | | 51.63 | |
| 10 | Sónia Martins | Portugal | x | 42.67 | 50.76 | | | | 50.76 | |
| 11 | Anabell Gómez | Venezuela | x | x | 45.99 | | | | 45.99 | |
| | Claudia Becerril | Mexico | x | x | x | | | | NM | |
| | Josiane Soares | Brazil | x | x | x | | | | NM | |

=== Javelin throw ===
July 17

| Rank | Name | Nationality | #1 | #2 | #3 | #4 | #5 | #6 | Result | Notes |
|---|---|---|---|---|---|---|---|---|---|---|
| 1st place, gold medalist(s) | Sabina Moya | Colombia | 53.67 | 54.99 | 52.09 | 50.38 | 58.65 | 50.28 | 58.65 | |
| 2nd place, silver medalist(s) | Zuleima Aramendiz | Colombia | 54.91 | 55.24 | 56.30 | 57.57 | x | 53.63 | 57.57 | |
| 3rd place, bronze medalist(s) | Idoia Mariezkurrena | Spain | 49.08 | 50.56 | 46.83 | 49.49 | 51.87 | 52.05 | 52.05 | |
| 4 | Romina Maggi | Argentina | 47.53 | 45.24 | 48.52 | x | 45.18 | x | 48.52 | |
| 5 | Alessandra Resende | Brazil | 44.96 | 45.99 | x | x | x | x | 45.99 | |
| 6 | Sílvia Cruz | Portugal | 39.05 | x | 42.64 | 40.84 | x | 39.73 | 42.64 | |

=== Heptathlon ===
July 17–18

The highest mark recorded in each event is highlighted in yellow

| Rank | Athlete | Nationality | 100m H | HJ | SP | 200m | LJ | JT | 800m | Points | Notes |
|---|---|---|---|---|---|---|---|---|---|---|---|
| 1st place, gold medalist(s) | Imma Clopés | Spain | 14.14 | 1.76 | 13.00 | 25.42 | 5.86 | 43.39 | 2:22.00 | 5799 | |
| 2nd place, silver medalist(s) | Euzinete dos Reis | Brazil | 14.42 | 1.73 | 11.07 | 24.96 | 5.86 | 43.50 | 2:21.98 | 5640 | |
| 3rd place, bronze medalist(s) | Zorobabelia Córdoba | Colombia | 14.41 | 1.58 | 13.80 | 25.04 | 5.51 | 46.32 | 2:24.62 | 5551 | |
| 4 | María Isabel Siles | Spain | 14.41 | 1.70 | 11.53 | 25.67 | 5.70 | 43.25 | 2:22.90 | 5506 | |
| 5 | Minerva Navarrete | Chile | 15.11 | 1.52 | 10.47 | 25.95 | 5.47 | 35.98 | 2:19.50 | 4944 | |
| 6 | Gladibeth Morles | Venezuela | 15.37 | 1.67 | 10.40 | 26.55 | 5.30 | 28.52 | 2:28.17 | 4725 | |
| 7 | Cristina Ferreira | Portugal | 16.44 | 1.55 | 11.32 | 27.12 | 5.33 | 46.93 | 2:38.86 | 4695 | |
| 8 | Ana Ferreira | Portugal | 15.45 | 1.55 | 9.91 | 26.49 | 5.25 | 32.10 | 2:32.65 | 4544 | |
