= Janeth Caizalitín =

Ecuadorian middle-distance runner

Personal information
- Full name: Janeth Marcia Caizalitín Tenorio-Alder
- Nationality: Ecuadorian
- Born: April 21, 1974 (age 52) Salcedo, Cotopaxi
- Height: 1.60 m (5 ft 3 in)
- Weight: 45 kg (99 lb)

Sport
- Sport: Athletics
- Event: Middle distance running
Medal record
Women's athletics
Representing Ecuador
South American Games
Gold medal – first place	1998 Cuenca	800 m
Gold medal – first place	1998 Cuenca	1500 m
Silver medal – second place	1998 Cuenca	5000 m
Silver medal – second place	1990 Lima	1500 m
Bolivarian Games
Gold medal – first place	1993 Cochabamba	1500 m
Gold medal – first place	1993 Cochabamba	3000 m
Gold medal – first place	1997 Arequipa	1500 m
Gold medal – first place	1997 Arequipa	5000 m
Silver medal – second place	1993 Cochabamba	800 m
- Updated on 4 June 2014

Janeth Marcia Caizalitín Tenorio (born April 21, 1974) is an Ecuadorian retired female athlete. She competed in the middle-distance events. She represented her native country at the 1992 Summer Olympics.

Caizalitín is from Latacunga, Ecuador. She was an All-American runner for the BYU Cougars track and field team, placing 5th in the 1500 metres at the 1994 NCAA Division I Outdoor Track and Field Championships.

== Personal bests ==
- 800 m: 2:07.14 min – Cuenca, October 1998
- 1500 m: 4:17.70 min – Manaus, 15 September 1990
- 3000 m: 9:27.43 min – Santa Fe, 25 June 1989

== Achievements ==
Year	Competition	Venue	Position	Event	Notes
Representing Ecuador
1988	South American Youth Championships	Cuenca, Ecuador	2nd	800 m	2:21.6 min A
1989	South American Junior Championships	Montevideo, Uruguay	3rd	800 m	2:12.97
1989	South American Junior Championships	Montevideo, Uruguay	3rd	1500 m	4:32.84
1989	South American Junior Championships	Montevideo, Uruguay	1st	3000 m	9:32.03
1989	Pan American Junior Championships	Santa Fe, Argentina	3rd	3000 m	9:27.43
1989	Pan American Junior Championships	Santa Fe, Argentina	3rd	10,000 m	35:48.37
1989	South American Championships	Medellín, Colombia	3rd	1,500 m	4:32.9 min A
1989	South American Championships	Medellín, Colombia	2nd	3,000 m	9:36.43 min A
1990	South American Cross Country Championships	Caracas, Venezuela	3rd	6 km	22:02
1990	South American Junior Championships	Bogotá, Colombia	2nd	800 m	2:12.22
1990	South American Junior Championships	Bogotá, Colombia	1st	1500 m	4:42.7
1990	South American Junior Championships	Bogotá, Colombia	2nd	3000 m	10:16.11
1990	Ibero-American Championships	Manaus, Brazil	8th	800m	2:09.39
1990	Ibero-American Championships	Manaus, Brazil	7th	1500m	4:17.70
1990	World Junior Championships	Plovdiv, Bulgaria	18th (h)	3000 m	9:29.28
1990	South American Youth Championships	Lima, Peru	1st	800 m	2:14.7 min
1990	South American Youth Championships	Lima, Peru	1st	1500 m	4:32.5 min
1990	South American Youth Championships	Lima, Peru	1st	3000 m	9:44.34 min
1990	South American Youth Championships	Lima, Peru	3rd	4 × 400 m relay	4:06.9 min
1990	South American Games	Lima, Peru	2nd	1,500 m	4:32.0 min
1991	World Cross Country Championships - Junior	Antwerp, Belgium	25th	4.435 km	15:06
1991	Pan American Junior Championships	Kingston, Jamaica	9th	1500 m	4:47.53
1992	World Cross Country Championships - Junior	Boston, United States	6th	4.005 km	14:00
1992	Ibero-American Championships	Seville, Spain	5th	1500m	4:22.70
1992	Ibero-American Championships	Seville, Spain	7th	3000m	9:37.03
1992	Olympic Games	Barcelona, Spain	11th (h)	3000 m	9:32.39
1992	South American Junior Championships	Lima, Peru	2nd	800 m	2:11.3
1992	South American Junior Championships	Lima, Peru	1st	1500 m	4:37.1
1992	South American Junior Championships	Lima, Peru	1st	3000 m	9:53.4
1992	World Junior Championships	Seoul, South Korea	12th	1500 m	4:23.95
1993	South American Cross Country Championships	Caracas, Venezuela	—	4 km	??
1993	World Cross Country Championships - Junior	Amorebieta, Spain	26th	4.45 km	15:16
1993	Bolivarian Games	Cochabamba, Bolivia	2nd	800 m	2:23.42 min A
1993	Bolivarian Games	Cochabamba, Bolivia	1st	1,500 m	4:33.21 min A
1993	Bolivarian Games	Cochabamba, Bolivia	1st	3,000 m	9:49.71 min A
1993	South American Junior Championships	Puerto La Cruz, Venezuela	1st	800 m	2:09.4
1993	South American Junior Championships	Puerto La Cruz, Venezuela	1st	1500 m	4:37.99
1993	South American Junior Championships	Puerto La Cruz, Venezuela	1st	3000 m	9:53.6
1993	Pan American Junior Championships	Winnipeg, Canada	1st	1500 m	4:30.61
1997	South American Championships	Mar del Plata, Argentina	1st	1500 m	4:33.65 min
1997	South American Championships	Mar del Plata, Argentina	4th	5000 m	16:54.93 min
1997	Bolivarian Games	Arequipa, Peru	1st	1500 m	4:29.1 min A
1997	Bolivarian Games	Arequipa, Peru	1st	5000 m	18:26.1 min A
1998	South American Cross Country Championships	Artur Nogueira, Brazil	7th	8 km	30:20
1998	South American Cross Country Championships	Artur Nogueira, Brazil	2nd	4 km	14:18
1998	World Cross Country Championships	Marrakesh, Morocco	36th	4 km	13:22
1998	Ibero-American Championships	Lisbon, Portugal	3rd	1500 m	4:20.38
1998	South American Games	Cuenca, Ecuador	1st	800 m	2:07.14 min A
1998	South American Games	Cuenca, Ecuador	1st	1500 m	4:23.07 min A
1998	South American Games	Cuenca, Ecuador	2nd	5000 m	16:48.6 min A
1999	Pan American Games	Winnipeg, Canada	6th	1500 m	4:24.68
1999	Pan American Games	Winnipeg, Canada	7th	5000 m	16:21.92
