= Solange Witteveen =

Argentine high jumper (born 1976)

Personal information
- Full name: Solange Marilú Witteveen
- Nationality: Argentina
- Born: February 6, 1976 (age 50) Buenos Aires, Argentina
- Height: 1.71 m (5 ft 7 in)
- Weight: 59 kg (130 lb)

Sport
- Sport: Athletics
Medal record
Women's athletics
Representing Argentina
Pan American Games
Gold medal – first place	1999 Winnipeg	High jump
South American Games
Gold medal – first place	1998 Cuenca	High jump
Summer Universiade
Bronze medal – third place	1999 Palma de Mallorca	High jump

Solange Marilú Witteveen (born 6 February 1976) is a retired Argentine high jumper. She won a gold medal at the 1999 Pan American Games. She also represented Argentina at the 2000 Olympic Games in Sydney and the 2004 Olympic Games in Athens.

== Career ==
Witteveen was born in Buenos Aires. Her personal best jump is 1.96 metres, achieved in September 1997 in Oristano. This is the current South American record.

Among her achievements, Witteveen won the 1997 South American Championships, the 1998 South American Games and the 1999 Pan American Games, as well as winning a bronze medal at the 1999 Summer Universiade. In both of her appearances at the Olympic Games, she cleared 1.89 m, finishing 20th overall in 2000 and 23rd in 2004.

In 2001, at the South American Championships, she jumped 1.97 metres which would be the new South American record. She, however, failed a doping test for a banned substance and was disqualified from competition for two years.

== Competition record ==
Year	Competition	Venue	Position	Event	Notes
Representing Argentina
1992	South American Youth Championships	Santiago, Chile	2nd	High jump	1.70 m
1993	South American Junior Championships	Puerto La Cruz, Venezuela	1st	High jump	1.75 m
1994	Ibero-American Championships	Mar del Plata, Argentina	5th	High jump	1.65 m
1994	South American Junior Championships	Santa Fe, Argentina	2nd	High jump	1.76 m
1995	Pan American Games	Mar del Plata, Argentina	7th	High jump	1.75 m
1995	Pan American Junior Championships	Santiago, Chile	2nd	Long jump	5.67 m
1995	South American Junior Championships	Santiago, Chile	2nd	High jump	1.74 m
1996	Ibero-American Championships	Medellín, Colombia	6th	High jump	1.80 m
1997	World Indoor Championships	Paris, France	21st (q)	High jump	1.80 m
1997	South American Championships	Mar del Plata, Argentina	1st	High jump	1.89 m
1997	World Championships	Athens, Greece	16th (q)	High jump	1.92 m
1997	Universiade	Catania, Italy	6th	High jump	1.91 m
1998	Ibero-American Championships	Lisbon, Portugal	2nd	High jump	1.83 m
1998	South American Games	Cuenca, Ecuador	1st	High jump	1.75 m A
1999	South American Championships	Bogotá, Colombia	–	High jump	NM
1999	Universiade	Palma de Mallorca, Spain	3rd	High jump	1.93 m
1999	Pan American Games	Winnipeg, Canada	1st	High jump	1.88 m
1999	World Championships	Seville, Spain	30th (q)	High jump	1.85 m
2000	Ibero-American Championships	Rio de Janeiro, Brazil	1st	High jump	1.87 m
2000	Olympic Games	Sydney, Australia	20th (q)	High jump	1.89 m
2001	South American Championships	Manaus, Brazil	–	4 × 100 m relay	DQ
2001	South American Championships	Manaus, Brazil	–	High jump	DQ
2003	Pan American Games	Santo Domingo, Dominican Republic	7th	High jump	1.80 m
2003	World Championships	Paris, France	18th (q)	High jump	1.85 m
2004	Ibero-American Championships	Huelva, Spain	5th	High jump	1.86 m
2004	Olympic Games	Athens, Greece	23rd (q)	High jump	1.89 m
2005	South American Championships	Cali, Colombia	2nd	High jump	1.88 m
2006	Ibero-American Championships	Ponce, Puerto Rico	4th	High jump	1.81 m
2006	South American Championships	Tunja, Colombia	5th	100 m hurdles	14.79 s
2006	South American Championships	Tunja, Colombia	4th	4 × 400 m relay	4:00.98 min
2006	South American Championships	Tunja, Colombia	2nd	High jump	1.82 m
2007	South American Championships	São Paulo, Brazil	2nd	High jump	1.81 m
2007	Pan American Games	Rio de Janeiro, Brazil	8th	High jump	1.81 m
2008	Ibero-American Championships	Iquique, Chile	3rd	High jump	1.83 m
2008	Ibero-American Championships	Iquique, Chile	4th	Triple jump	12.39 m
2009	South American Championships	Lima, Peru	2nd	High jump	1.85 m
2009	South American Championships	Lima, Peru	6th	Triple jump	12.53 m

== Personal bests ==
Outdoor

- 100 metres hurdles – 14.62 (+1.5 m/s) (Buenos Aires 2006)
- High jump – 1.96 (Oristano 1997)
- Long jump – 6.27 (+0.3 m/s) (Montevideo 1999)
- Triple jump – 12.43 (+1.3 m/s) (Buenos Aires 2006)

Indoor

- High jump – 1.94 (Brno 2000)
