= Luciane Dambacher =

Brazilian high jumper

Personal information
- Born: 10 May 1976 (age 50)

Sport
- Sport: Track and field
Medal record
Representing Brazil
Pan American Games
| Silver medal – second place | 1999 Winnipeg | High jump |

Luciane Dambacher (born 10 May 1976) is a retired Brazilian athlete who specialised in the high jump. She won the silver medal at the 1999 Pan American Games in Winnipeg. In addition, she won many medals on continental level.

Her personal best in the event is 1.88 metres, first set in 1999.

== Competition record ==
| Year | Competition | Venue | Position | Notes |
Representing Brazil
| 1992 | South American Junior Championships | Lima, Peru | 3rd | 1.62 m |
| 1992 | South American Youth Championships | Santiago, Chile | 1st | 1.70 m |
| 1993 | South American Junior Championships | Puerto La Cruz, Venezuela | 3rd | 1.72 m |
| 1994 | World Junior Championships | Lisbon, Portugal | 14th (q) | 1.80 m |
| 1994 | South American Junior Championships | Santa Fe, Argentina | 1st | 1.78 m |
| 1994 | Ibero-American Championships | Mar del Plata, Argentina | 2nd | 1.75 m |
| 1995 | South American Championships | Manaus, Brazil | 2nd | 1.75 m |
| 1995 | Pan American Junior Championships | Santiago, Chile | 6th | 1.71 m |
| 1995 | South American Junior Championships | Santiago, Chile | 1st | 1.76 m |
| 1996 | Ibero-American Championships | Medellín, Colombia | 8th | 1.75 m |
| 1997 | South American Championships | Mar del Plata, Argentina | 4th | 1.76 m |
| 1998 | Ibero-American Championships | Lisbon, Portugal | 5th | 1.75 m |
| 1999 | South American Championships | Bogotá, Colombia | 1st | 1.87 m |
| 1999 | Universiade | Palma de Mallorca, Spain | (q) | 1.80 m |
| 1999 | Pan American Games | Winnipeg, Canada | 2nd | 1.85 m |
| 2000 | Ibero-American Championships | Rio de Janeiro, Brazil | 3rd | 1.81 m |
| 2001 | South American Championships | Manaus, Brazil | 1st | 1.83 m |
| 2001 | Universiade | Beijing, China | (q) | 1.80 m |
| 2002 | Ibero-American Championships | Guatemala City, Guatemala | 2nd | 1.84 m |
| 2003 | South American Championships | Barquisimeto, Venezuela | 1st | 1.82 m |
| 2003 | Pan American Games | Santo Domingo, Dominican Republic | 10th | 1.75 m |
