= Athletics at the 1999 Pan American Games – Women's triple jump =

Women's triple jump at the Pan American Games

The women's triple jump event at the 1999 Pan American Games was held on July 28.

== Results ==
Rank	Name	Nationality	#1	#2	#3	#4	#5	#6	Result	Notes
1st place, gold medalist(s)	Yamilé Aldama	Cuba	14.17	14.77	x	13.99	–	14.37	14.77	GR
2nd place, silver medalist(s)	Suzette Lee	Jamaica	13.38	13.72	x	13.57	14.09	x	14.09	
3rd place, bronze medalist(s)	Magdelín Martínez	Cuba	13.67	13.86	13.97	13.95	13.98	13.57	13.98	
4	Stacey Bowers	United States	13.55	13.52	13.97	13.83	13.93	13.79	13.97	
5	Tiombe Hurd	United States	13.57	x	x	13.39	13.69	13.56	13.69	
6	Mónica Falcioni	Uruguay	13.50	13.30	x	13.49	13.49	13.17	13.50	
7	Andrea Ávila	Argentina	x	13.10	13.40	x	12.86	x	13.40	
8	Michelle Hastick	Canada	12.99	12.98	13.25	13.04	13.09	11.78	13.25	
9	Natasha Gibson	Trinidad and Tobago	12.86	13.13	13.13				13.13	
	Luciana dos Santos	Brazil							DNS	
	Flora Hyacinth	United States Virgin Islands							DNS	
