= Athletics at the 1998 South American Games =

Athletics at the VI South American Games
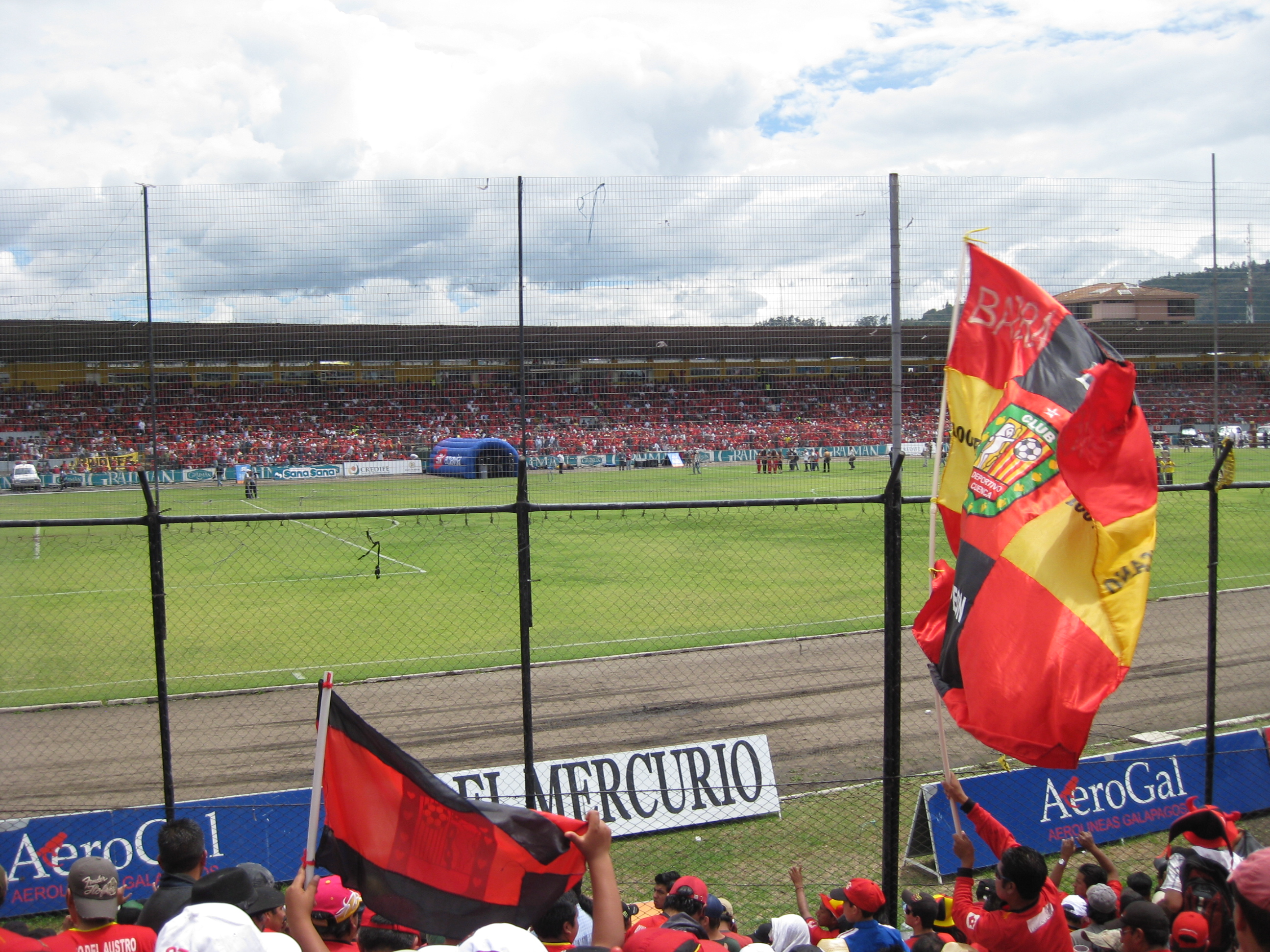
- Estadio Alejandro Serrano Aguilar
- Dates: October 26–30
- Host city: Cuenca, Ecuador
- Venue: Estadio Alejandro Serrano Aguilar
- Level: Senior
- Events: 45 (24 men, 21 women)

Athletics events at the 1998 South American Games were held at the Coliseo Mayor de Deportes Jefferson Pérez next to the Estadio Alejandro Serrano Aguilar in Cuenca, Ecuador, between October 26–30, 1998. A total of 45 events were contested, 24 by men and 21 by women. Brazil and Venezuela did not participate in the athletics events.

For the first time, a minimum participation of 4 nations per event was required to award a full set of medals. Men's triple jump and women's 4 x 400 m relay events were concerned, where athletes coming in third did not get bronze medals. Women's marathon was completely cancelled, because there would have been only athletes from host country Ecuador.

== Medal summary ==
Medal winners were published in a book by written Argentinian journalist Ernesto Rodríguez III with support of the Argentine Olympic Committee (Spanish: Comité Olímpico Argentino) under the auspices of the Ministry of Education (Spanish: Ministerio de Educación de la Nación) in collaboration with the Office of Sports (Spanish: Secretaría de Deporte de la Nación). Eduardo Biscayart supplied the list of winners and their results. Further results were published elsewhere, or can be found in athlete's IAAF biographies.

All results are marked as "affected by altitude" (A), because the stadium in Cuenca is situated 2536 m above sea level.

=== Men ===
Event	Gold		Silver		Bronze	
100 metres (wind: +0.3 m/s)	Ricardo Roach; Chile	10.36 A	Carlos Gats; Argentina	10.39 A	Juan Pablo Faúndez; Chile	10.49 A
200 metres (wind: +0.1 m/s)	Ricardo Roach; Chile	20.4 A	Héber Viera; Uruguay	21.0 A	Dick Perlaza; Ecuador	21.0 A
400 metres	Dick Perlaza; Ecuador	46.90 A	Carlos Zbinden; Chile	47.22 A	Fabián Aguilera; Chile	48.90 A
800 metres	Mauricio Torres; Chile	1:54.7 A	Pablo Ramírez; Ecuador	1:56.1 A	Carlos Salcedo; Ecuador	1:56.9 A
1500 metres	Pablo Ramírez; Ecuador	4:01.37 A	Richard Arias; Ecuador	4:01.49 A	Geovanni Morejón; Bolivia	4:03.84 A
5000 metres	Jacinto López; Colombia	14:45.09 A	Julio Cutipa; Peru	14:53.27 A	Vicente Chura; Peru	15:00.47 A
10,000 metres	Jacinto López; Colombia	30:09.5 A	Julio Cutipa; Peru	30:10.0 A	Franklin Tenorio; Ecuador	30:13.2 A
Marathon	William Ramírez; Ecuador	2:19:56 A	José Jami; Ecuador	2:29:08 A	Vicente Chura; Peru	2:29:22 A
110 metres hurdles (wind: +0.6 m/s)	Carlos Vega; Chile	14.57 A	Jackson Quiñónez; Ecuador	14.58 A	Omar Triviño; Ecuador	15.03 A
400 metres hurdles	Carlos Zbinden; Chile	50.1 A GR	Xavier Caicedo; Ecuador	55.7 A	Richard Ayoví; Ecuador	55.9 A
3000 metres steeplechase	Richard Arias; Ecuador	9:16.35 A	Pablo Ramírez; Ecuador	9:19.04 A	Geovanni Morejón; Bolivia	9:19.94 A
4 x 100 metres relay	Ecuador; Jackson Quiñónez; Dick Perlaza; Julio Márquez; Fernando Espinoza	40.40 A	Chile; Fabian Aguilera; Ricardo Roach; Juan Pablo Faúndez; Carlos Vega	40.63 A	Colombia; Jhon Córdoba; Gilmar Mayo; Jacinto López; José Alirio Carrasco	47.42 A
4 x 400 metres relay	Ecuador; Xavier Caicedo; Cristián Gutiérrez; Reuber Navarro; Dick Perlaza	3:11.7 A	Chile; Fabián Aguilera; Mauricio Torres; Juan Pablo Faúndez; Carlos Zbinden	3:12.0 A	Peru; Julio Cutipa; Eduardo Umbert; Juan Tello; Vicente Chura	4:12.2 A
20 Kilometres Walk	Jefferson Pérez; Ecuador	1:23:11 A GR	Nixon Zambrano; Colombia	1:29:28 A	Omar Aguirre; Ecuador	1:33:25 A
50 Kilometres Walk	Héctor Moreno; Colombia	4:27:13 A GR	Patricio Villacorte; Ecuador	4:45:34 A	Freddy Choque; Bolivia	4:46:15 A
High jump	Gilmar Mayo; Colombia	2.24 A	Jackson Quiñónez; Ecuador	2.13 A	Wilmer Cortez; Ecuador	2.00 A
Pole vault	Francisco León; Peru	4.60 A	Diego Moraga; Chile	3.20 A	Flavio Corozo; Ecuador	3.05 A
Long jump	Cristián Antivilo; Chile	7.44 A	Gilmar Mayo; Colombia	7.29 A	Wilmer Cortez; Ecuador	7.28 A
Triple jump	Gilmar Mayo; Colombia	15.78 A	Wilmer Cortez; Ecuador	15.40 A	Cristián Antivilo^{†} Chile	
Shot put	Marco Antonio Verni; Chile	17.76 A	Juan Tello; Peru	16.66 A	Marcelo Pugliese; Argentina	15.46 A
Discus throw	Marcelo Pugliese; Argentina	59.74 A GR	Marco Antonio Verni; Chile	51.88 A	Juan Tello; Peru	49.46 A
Hammer throw	Juan Cerra; Argentina	68.56 A	Eduardo Acuña; Peru	63.94 A	José Llano; Chile	63.28 A
Javelin throw	Nery Kennedy; Paraguay	71.70 A	Diego Moraga; Chile	67.94 A	Flavio Corozo; Ecuador	57.85 A
Decathlon	Santiago Lorenzo; Argentina	6940 A GR	Flavio Corozo; Ecuador	6244 A		

==== Notes ====
^{†}: No medal because of lack of minimum participation.

=== Women ===
Event	Gold		Silver		Bronze	
100 metres (wind: -0.2 m/s)	Ana Caicedo; Ecuador	11.57 A GR	Felipa Palacios; Colombia	11.62 A	Lisette Rondón; Chile	11.76 A
200 metres (wind: +0.1 m/s)	Felipa Palacios; Colombia	22.78 A GR	Lisette Rondón; Chile	23.79 A	Ana Caicedo; Ecuador	23.9 A
400 metres	Felipa Palacios; Colombia	53.45 A	Sulay Nazareno; Ecuador	55.03 A	Hannelore Grosser; Chile	55.64 A
800 metres	Janeth Caizalitín; Ecuador	2:07.14 A	Niusha Mansilla; Bolivia	2:07.85 A	Mercy Colorado; Ecuador	2:09.65 A
1500 metres	Janeth Caizalitín; Ecuador	4:23.07 A	Niusha Mansilla; Bolivia	4:25.42 A	Bertha Sánchez; Colombia	4:26.29 A
5000 metres	Martha Tenorio; Ecuador	16:27.6 A GR	Janeth Caizalitín; Ecuador	16:48.6 A	Niusha Mansilla; Bolivia	17:17.9 A
10,000 metres	Martha Tenorio; Ecuador	34:23.6 A GR	Erika Olivera; Chile	36:00.0 A	Raquel Aceituno; Peru	37:26.1 A
100 metres hurdles (wind: +0.5 m/s)	Verónica Depaoli; Argentina	13.62 A GR	María Quiñones; Colombia	13.69 A	Ondina Rodríguez; Ecuador	14.68 A
400 metres hurdles	Ondina Rodríguez; Ecuador	60.0 A	Martha González; Ecuador	65.6 A	Minerva Navarrete; Chile	
4 x 100 metres relay	Ecuador; Sulay Nazareno; Ondina Rodríguez; Maritza Valencia; Ana Caicedo	45.9 A	Colombia; María Quiñones; Felipa Palacios; Zorobabelia Córdoba; Sabina Moya	46.6 A	Chile; Minerva Navarrete; María Isabel Coloma; Hannelore Grosser; Lisette Rondón	53.0 A
4 x 400 metres relay	Ecuador; Mercy Colorado; Ondina Rodríguez; Sulay Nazareno; Maritza Quiñónez	3:44.12 A	Chile		Colombia^{†}	
10 Kilometres Walk	Bertha Vera; Ecuador	47:59.2 A GR	Geovana Irusta; Bolivia	48:22.0 A	Miriam Ramón; Ecuador	48:30.0 A
High jump	Solange Witteveen; Argentina	1.75 A =GR	Paula Palma; Chile	1.45 A	Paola Ruiz; Ecuador	1.40 A
Pole vault	Alejandra García; Argentina	4.05 A GR	Déborah Gyurcsek; Uruguay	4.00 A	Irina Castillo; Peru	3.30 A
Long jump	Mónica Falcioni; Uruguay	6.47 A	Andrea Ávila; Argentina	6.36 A	Ana Caicedo; Ecuador	6.05 A
Triple jump	Andrea Ávila; Argentina	13.60 A GR	Mónica Falcioni; Uruguay	13.55 A	Ana Gabriela Villacís; Ecuador	11.90 A
Shot put	Zorobabelia Córdoba; Colombia	13.92 A	Karina Díaz; Ecuador	12.26 A	Paula Palma; Chile	11.84 A
Discus throw	María Eugenia Villamizar; Colombia	41.00 A	Karina Córdova; Ecuador	38.26 A	Karina Díaz; Ecuador	36.64 A
Hammer throw	María Eugenia Villamizar; Colombia	57.84 A GR	Ana Cuastumal; Ecuador	50.00 A	Karina Córdova; Ecuador	48.93 A
Javelin throw	Sabina Moya; Colombia	54.08 A	Daniela Masoli; Chile	47.64 A	Paula Palma; Chile	46.30 A
Heptathlon	Zorobabelia Córdoba; Colombia	4868 A	Minerva Navarrete; Chile	4604 A	Dolores Martínez; Ecuador	3305 A

==== Notes ====
^{†}: No medal because of lack of minimum participation.

== Medal table (unofficial) ==
* Host nation (Ecuador)

Rank	Nation	Gold	Silver	Bronze	Total
1	Ecuador*†	16	16	20	52
2	Colombia	12	5	2	19
3	Chile	7	12	9	28
4	Argentina	7	2	1	10
5	Peru	1	4	6	11
6	Uruguay	1	3	0	4
7	Paraguay	1	0	0	1
8	Bolivia	0	3	4	7
Totals (8 entries)		45	45	42	132

=== Notes ===
^{†}: In contrast to the unofficial count above, only 15 gold, 14 silver and 19 bronze medals for Ecuador are published. There might have been further events than marked above falling short of participants leading to a reduced number of medals.
