= Andrea Ávila =

Argentine long/triple jumper

Personal information
- Full name: Andrea Verónica Ávila
- Nationality: Argentina
- Born: April 4, 1970 (age 56) Villa Carlos Paz, Argentina
- Height: 1.71 m (5 ft 7 in)
- Weight: 55 kg (121 lb)

Sport
- Sport: athletics
Medal record
Women's Athletics
Representing Argentina
Pan American Games
Silver medal – second place	1995 Mar del Plata	Long Jump
Bronze medal – third place	1995 Mar del Plata	Triple Jump
South American Games
Gold medal – first place	1990 Lima	Long jump
Gold medal – first place	1994 Valencia	Long jump
Gold medal – first place	1994 Valencia	Triple jump
Gold medal – first place	1998 Cuenca	Triple jump
Silver medal – second place	1998 Cuenca	Long jump
South American Youth Championships
Silver medal – second place	1984 Tarija	4x100 m relay
- Updated on 8 May 2013

Andrea Verónica Ávila (born April 4, 1970, in Villa Carlos Paz) is a retired long and triple jumper from Argentina.

Ávila won two medals at the 1995 Pan American Games in Mar del Plata, Argentina. She competed in two consecutive Summer Olympics for her native country, starting in 1996.

== International competitions ==
Year	Competition	Venue	Position	Event	Notes
Representing Argentina
1984	South American Youth Championships	Tarija, Bolivia	6th	100 m	13.1 s A
1984	South American Youth Championships	Tarija, Bolivia	2nd	4 × 100 m relay	50.9 s A
1987	South American Junior Championships	Santiago, Chile	8th	High jump	1.55 m
1987	South American Junior Championships	Santiago, Chile	3rd	Long jump	5.68 m
1989	South American Junior Championships	Montevideo, Uruguay	3rd	High jump	1.66 m
1989	South American Junior Championships	Montevideo, Uruguay	1st	Long jump	5.98 m
1989	Pan American Junior Championships	Santa Fe, Argentina	2nd	Long jump	5.88 m
1990	Ibero-American Championships	Manaus, Brazil	2nd	Long jump	6.16 m
1990	South American Games	Lima, Peru	1st	Long jump	6.12 m
1991	Pan American Games	Havana, Cuba	5th	Long jump	6.32 m
1992	Ibero-American Championships	Seville, Spain	3rd	Triple jump	12.82 m (+1.0 m/s)
1993	World Indoor Championships	Toronto, Canada	10th	Triple jump	13.35 m
1993	South American Championships	Lima, Peru	1st	Long jump	6.45 m (w)
1993	South American Championships	Lima, Peru	1st	Triple jump	13.91 m
1993	World Championships	Stuttgart, Germany	22nd (q)	Long jump	6.23 m
1993	World Championships	Stuttgart, Germany	–	Triple jump	NM
1994	Ibero-American Championships	Mar del Plata, Argentina	1st	Long jump	6.58 m (+1.9 m/s)
1994	Ibero-American Championships	Mar del Plata, Argentina	1st	Triple jump	13.18 m (+2.0 m/s)
1994	Ibero-American Championships	Mar del Plata, Argentina	4th	4 × 100 m relay	46.97
1994	South American Games	Valencia, Venezuela	1st	Long jump	6.51 m
1994	South American Games	Valencia, Venezuela	1st	Triple jump	13.12 m
1995	Pan American Games	Mar del Plata, Argentina	2nd	Long jump	6.52 m
1995	Pan American Games	Mar del Plata, Argentina	3rd	Triple jump	13.84 m (w)
1995	South American Championships	Manaus, Brazil	1st	Long jump	6.58 m
1995	South American Championships	Manaus, Brazil	1st	Triple jump	13.34 m
1995	South American Championships	Manaus, Brazil	3rd	Heptathlon	5290 pts
1995	World Championships	Gothenburg, Sweden	24th (q)	Long jump	6.39 m
1995	World Championships	Gothenburg, Sweden	25th (q)	Triple jump	13.41 m
1996	Ibero-American Championships	Medellín, Colombia	4th	Long jump	6.22 m
1996	Olympic Games	Atlanta, United States	32nd (q)	Long jump	6.00 m
1997	South American Championships	Mar del Plata, Argentina	4th	100 m hurdles	14.48
1997	South American Championships	Mar del Plata, Argentina	2nd	Long jump	6.26 m (w)
1997	South American Championships	Mar del Plata, Argentina	1st	Triple jump	13.76 m
1997	World Championships	Athens, Greece	33rd (q)	Long jump	6.08 m
1997	World Championships	Athens, Greece	28th (q)	Triple jump	13.45 m
1998	Ibero-American Championships	Lisbon, Portugal	1st	Long jump	6.41 m
1998	Ibero-American Championships	Lisbon, Portugal	4th	Triple jump	13.36 m
1998	South American Games	Cuenca, Ecuador	2nd	Long jump	6.36 m
1998	South American Games	Cuenca, Ecuador	1st	Triple jump	13.60 m
1999	South American Championships	Bogotá, Colombia	5th	Long jump	6.59 m (w)
1999	South American Championships	Bogotá, Colombia	3rd	Triple jump	13.57 m
1999	Pan American Games	Winnipeg, Canada	11th	Long jump	6.03 m
1999	Pan American Games	Winnipeg, Canada	7th	Triple jump	13.40 m
2000	Ibero-American Championships	Rio de Janeiro, Brazil	2nd	Long jump	6.41 m
2000	Ibero-American Championships	Rio de Janeiro, Brazil	–	Triple jump	NM
2000	Olympic Games	Sydney, Australia	32nd (q)	Long jump	6.11 m
2001	South American Championships	Manaus, Brazil	5th	Long jump	5.99 m
