= Rodrigo Moreno (athlete) =

Colombian race walker

Personal information
- Full name: Rodrigo Moreno Munar
- Born: 29 April 1966 (age 60) Bogotá, Colombia
- Height: 1.62 m (5 ft 4 in)
- Weight: 56 kg (123 lb)

Sport
- Country: Colombia
- Sport: Men's Athletics
- Event: Race walking

Achievements and titles
- Olympic finals: 2008 Summer Olympics
Medal record
Men's Race walking
Representing Colombia
Central American and Caribbean Games
Silver medal – second place	2010 Mayagüez	50 km
Bolivarian Games
Silver medal – second place	1993 Cochabamba	50 km

Rodrigo Moreno Munar (born 29 April 1966) is a Colombian retired race walker.

== Personal bests ==
Event	Result	Venue	Date
Road walk
20 km	1:30:11 hrs	Bogotá, Colombia	30 January 2010
35 km	2:47:23 hrs	Bogotá, Colombia	15 March 2009
50 km	4:00:06 hrs	Royal Leamington Spa, United Kingdom	15 June 2008
Track walk
20,000 m	1:31:07.37 hrs	Bogotá, Colombia	23 May 2009

== Achievements ==
Year	Competition	Venue	Position	Event	Notes
Representing Colombia
1990	South American Race Walking Cup (U20)	Guayaquil, Ecuador	2nd	35 km	2:58:52.00
1991	South American Race Walking Cup (U20)	Bogotá, Colombia	1st	35 km	2:53:36
1993	Bolivarian Games	Cochabamba, Bolivia	2nd	50 km	4:18:47 A
1996	Pan American Race Walking Cup	Manaus, Brazil	7th	50 km	4:38:38
1997	South American Race Walking Cup (U20)	Bogotá, Colombia	3rd	35 km	3:01:38
1998	Central American and Caribbean Games	Maracaibo, Venezuela	5th	50 km	4:36:37
2005	Pan American Race Walking Cup	Lima, Peru	8th	50 km	4:25:29
2005	Bolivarian Games	Armenia, Colombia	–	50 km	DQ
2007	Pan American Race Walking Cup	Balneário Camboriú, Brazil	5th	50 km	4:18:28
2008	Olympic Games	Beijing, China	50th	50 km	4:03:52
2009	Pan American Race Walking Cup	San Salvador, El Salvador	3rd	50 km	4:09:31
2009	Pan American Race Walking Cup	San Salvador, El Salvador	1st	Team (50 km)	15 pts
2010	World Race Walking Cup	Chihuahua, Mexico	20th	50 km	4:05:44
2010	Central American and Caribbean Games	Mayagüez, Puerto Rico	2nd	50 km	4:11:42
2011	Pan American Race Walking Cup	Envigado, Colombia	5th	50 km	4:13:27
2011	Pan American Race Walking Cup	Envigado, Colombia	1st	Team (50 km)	11 pts
2012	World Race Walking Cup	Saransk, Russia	34th	50 km	4:03:38
2013	Pan American Race Walking Cup	Guatemala City, Guatemala	–	50 km	DNF A
2013	Pan American Race Walking Cup	Guatemala City, Guatemala	2nd	Team (50 km)	24 pts
2015	Pan American Race Walking Cup	Arica, Chile	15th	50 km	4:16:11
