= Athletics at the 1995 Pan American Games – Women's hammer throw =

The women's hammer throw event at the 1995 Pan American Games was held at the Estadio Atletico "Justo Roman" on 17 March. It was the first time that the hammer was contested by women at the Games and one of the earliest international competitions for this event.

== Results ==
Rank	Name	Nationality	#1	#2	#3	#4	#5	#6	Result	Notes
1st place, gold medalist(s)	Alex Givan	United States	57.12	55.70	58.92	x	x	x	58.92	
2nd place, silver medalist(s)	María Eugenia Villamizar	Colombia	54.96	53.64	54.46	53.62	53.86	56.14	56.14	
3rd place, bronze medalist(s)	Sonja Fitts	United States	56.06	52.62	53.44	x	55.32	x	56.06	
4	Zulma Lambert	Argentina	54.06	x	46.16	x	x	x	54.06	
5	Theresa Brick	Canada	52.26	x	52.06	53.78	x	52.12	53.78	
6	Karina Moya	Argentina	44.88	47.38	51.94	x	48.96	51.72	51.94	
7	Norbi Balantén	Cuba	50.88	x	x	x	x	x	50.88	
8	Lidia de la Cruz	Mexico	46.66	x	x	44.10	45.58	x	46.66	
