= Athletics at the 1995 Pan American Games – Women's long jump =

Women's long jump at the Pan American Games

The women's long jump event at the 1995 Pan American Games was held at the Estadio Atletico "Justo Roman" on 21 March.

== Results ==
Rank	Name	Nationality	#1	#2	#3	#4	#5	#6	Result	Notes
1st place, gold medalist(s)	Niurka Montalvo	Cuba	6.68	6.89	x	6.75	x	x	6.89	
2nd place, silver medalist(s)	Andrea Ávila	Argentina	6.47	6.52	6.44	6.42	6.50	6.43	6.52	
3rd place, bronze medalist(s)	Jackie Edwards	Bahamas	x	6.50	x	6.22	x	x	6.50	
4	Laiza Carrillo	Cuba	x	6.21	6.18	x	6.21	6.22	6.22	
5	Dawn Burrell	United States	x	x	5.80	6.15	5.73	x	6.15	
6	Tamara Cuffee	United States	6.09w	6.03	x	x	x	5.68	6.09w	
7	Mónica Castro	Chile	5.89	5.75	5.91	5.90	5.86	5.76	5.91	
	Alejandra García	Argentina							DNS	
	Daphne Saunders	Bahamas							DNS	
