= Athletics at the 1991 Pan American Games – Women's long jump =

Women's long jump at the Pan American Games

The women's long jump event at the 1991 Pan American Games was held in Havana, Cuba.

== Results ==
Rank	Name	Nationality	#1	#2	#3	#4	#5	#6	Result	Notes
1st place, gold medalist(s)	Diane Guthrie	Jamaica	6.09	6.64	x	5.96	6.39	6.07	6.64	
2nd place, silver medalist(s)	Eloína Echevarría	Cuba	6.47	x	6.53	6.60w	x	x	6.60w	
3rd place, bronze medalist(s)	Julie Bright	United States	6.11	4.68	6.46w	4.64	x	6.53w	6.53w	
4	Flora Hyacinth	United States Virgin Islands	6.43w	–	6.06	x	x	5.15	6.43w	
5	Andrea Ávila	Argentina	6.10	x	5.77	6.06	6.18w	6.32	6.32	
6	Euphemia Huggins	Trinidad and Tobago	x	6.24	x	6.25	6.07	x	6.25	
7	Dionne Rose	Jamaica	6.24	5.99	5.76	6.14w	x	6.18	6.24	
8	Gwen Loud	United States	x	x	6.15	x	6.23	6.03	6.23	
9	Tonia Redhead	Canada	5.88	6.04w	x				6.04w	
10	Niurka Montalvo	Cuba	x	x	6.04				6.04	
11	Nancy Gillis	Canada	5.99w	5.79	5.72w				5.99w	
