= Athletics at the 1995 Pan American Games – Women's triple jump =

Women's triple jump at the Pan American Games

The women's triple jump event at the 1995 Pan American Games was held at the Estadio Atletico "Justo Roman" on 17 March. It was the first time that this event was contested at the Pan American Games.

== Results ==
Rank	Name	Nationality	#1	#2	#3	#4	#5	#6	Result	Notes
1st place, gold medalist(s)	Laiza Carrillo	Cuba	13.65	13.69	x	14.09	13.99	14.09	14.09	
2nd place, silver medalist(s)	Niurka Montalvo	Cuba	13.43	13.90w	x	13.78	13.80	13.68	13.90w	
3rd place, bronze medalist(s)	Andrea Ávila	Argentina	13.65	13.69	13.84w	x	13.79	x	13.84w	
4	Suzette Lee	Jamaica	13.45	13.63w	13.28	13.35	13.24	13.31	13.63w	
5	Carla Shannon	United States	x	13.32	13.36w	13.02	11.68	13.02	13.36w	
6	Nicola Martial	Guyana	13.05	12.81	12.28	x	11.91	x	13.05	
7	Lilia Aguirre	Argentina	x	x	x	12.45	12.69w	12.36	12.69w	
8	Jenice Gill	Belize	x	x	11.96w	x	11.42	x	11.96w	
	Sheila Hudson-Strudwick	United States							DNS	
	Diana Orrange	United States							DNS	
