= Laiza Carrillo =

Cuban long and triple jumper (born 1968)

Personal information
- Born: November 27, 1968 (age 57)

Sport
- Sport: Track and field
Medal record
Athletics
Representing Cuba
Pan American Games
Gold medal – first place	1995 Mar del Plata	Triple jump
Central American and Caribbean Games
Bronze medal – third place	1990 Mexico City	Heptathlon
CAC Junior Championships (U20)
Gold medal – first place	1986 Mexico City	Heptathlon
Silver medal – second place	1986 Mexico City	Long jump

Laiza Carrillo Mesa (born November 27, 1968) is a retired female long and triple jumper, who also competed in the heptathlon during her career. She set her personal best (14.43 metres) in the women's triple jump event on 1995-02-23 in Havana.

== International competitions ==
Year	Competition	Venue	Position	Event	Notes
Representing Cuba
1986	Central American and Caribbean Junior Championships (U-20)	Mexico City, México	5th	100 m	12.46
1986	Central American and Caribbean Junior Championships (U-20)	Mexico City, México	2nd	Long jump	6.22 m
1986	Central American and Caribbean Junior Championships (U-20)	Mexico City, México	1st	Heptathlon	4834 pts
1987	Central American and Caribbean Championships	Caracas, Venezuela	2nd	Heptathlon	5130 pts
1990	Central American and Caribbean Games	Mexico City, Mexico	3rd	Heptathlon	5519 pts A
1991	Pan American Games	Havana, Cuba	4th	Heptathlon	5592 pts
1995	Pan American Games	Mar del Plata, Argentina	4th	Long Jump	6.22 m
1995	Pan American Games	Mar del Plata, Argentina	1st	Triple Jump	14.09 m
