= Athletics at the 1999 Pan American Games – Women's 5000 metres =

Women's 5000 metres at the Pan American Games

The women's 5000 metres event at the 1999 Pan American Games was held on July 25.

== Results ==
Rank	Name	Nationality	Time	Notes
1st place, gold medalist(s)	Adriana Fernández	Mexico	15:56.57	
2nd place, silver medalist(s)	Bertha Sánchez	Colombia	15:59.04	
3rd place, bronze medalist(s)	Blake Phillips	United States	15:59.77	
4	Nora Rocha	Mexico	16:07.76	
5	Kristin Ihle	United States	16:14.07	
6	Stella Castro	Colombia	16:21.92	
7	Janeth Caizalitín	Ecuador	16:28.66	
	Janil Williams	Antigua and Barbuda	DNS	
	Martha Tenorio	Ecuador	DNS	
