= Mónica Falcioni =

Personal information
- Full name: Mónica Jacqueline Falcioni Costa
- Nationality: Uruguay
- Born: October 10, 1968 (age 57)
- Height: 1.67 m (5 ft 6 in)
- Weight: 64 kg (141 lb)

Sport
- Sport: Athletics
Medal record
Women's athletics
Representing Uruguay
South American Games
Gold medal – first place	1998 Cuenca	Long jump
Silver medal – second place	1998 Cuenca	Triple jump
South American Youth Championships
Gold medal – first place	1984 Tarija	Long jump
- Updated on 8 May 2013

Mónica Jacqueline Falcioni Costa (born October 10, 1968) is a retired long and triple jumper from Uruguay.

== Career ==
Falcioni represented her native country at the 2000 Summer Olympics in Sydney, Australia. There she was the flag bearer for her native country at the opening ceremony.

== Achievements ==
Year	Competition	Venue	Position	Event	Notes
Representing Uruguay
1984	South American Youth Championships	Tarija, Bolivia	1st	Long jump	5.54 m A
1985	South American Junior Championships	Santa Fe, Argentina	6th	Long jump	5.48 m
1986	World Junior Championships	Athens, Greece	21st (q)	Long jump	5.52 m
1994	Ibero-American Championships	Mar del Plata, Argentina	6th	Long jump	5.82 m (wind: +1.4 m/s)
1997	South American Championships	Mar del Plata, Argentina	3rd	Long jump	6.25 m (w)
1997	South American Championships	Mar del Plata, Argentina	4th	Triple jump	12.94 m
1998	South American Games	Cuenca, Ecuador	1st	Long jump	6.47 m
1998	South American Games	Cuenca, Ecuador	2nd	Triple jump	13.55 m
1999	South American Championships	Bogotá, Colombia	4th	Long jump	6.61 m (w)
1999	South American Championships	Bogotá, Colombia	2nd	Triple jump	13.57 m
1999	Pan American Games	Winnipeg, Canada	10th	Long jump	6.03 m
1999	Pan American Games	Winnipeg, Canada	6th	Triple jump	13.50 m
2000	Ibero-American Championships	Rio de Janeiro, Brazil	8th	Long jump	5.70 m
2000	Ibero-American Championships	Rio de Janeiro, Brazil	3rd	Triple jump	12.92 m
2000	Olympic Games	Sydney, Australia	34th (q)	Long jump	6.05 m
2001	South American Championships	Manaus, Brazil	4th	Long jump	6.00 m
2001	South American Championships	Manaus, Brazil	3rd	Triple jump	13.43 m
2002	Ibero-American Championships	Guatemala City, Guatemala	5th	Triple jump	13.02 m
2003	South American Championships	Barquisimeto, Venezuela	3rd	Long jump	5.94 m
2003	South American Championships	Barquisimeto, Venezuela	5th	Triple jump	12.79 m
2003	Pan American Games	Santo Domingo, Dom. Rep.	7th	Long jump	5.90 m
2003	Pan American Games	Santo Domingo, Dom. Rep.	9th	Triple jump	13.02 m

Olympic Games
Preceded by Marcelo Filippini	Flagbearer for Uruguay; Sydney 2000	Succeeded by Serrana Fernández
