= Juan Pablo Faúndez =

Chilean sprinter

Personal information
- Full name: Juan Pablo Faúndez Allier
- Nationality: Chilean
- Born: 2 November 1975 (age 50)
- Height: 1.82 m (6 ft 0 in)
- Weight: 73 kg (161 lb)

Sport
- Sport: Sprinting
- Event: 4 × 100 metres relay
Medal record
Representing Chile
South American Games
Silver medal – second place	1998 Cuenca	4x100m relay
Silver medal – second place	1998 Cuenca	4x400m relay
Bronze medal – third place	1998 Cuenca	100m

Juan Pablo Faúndez Allier (born 2 November 1975) is a Chilean sprinter. He competed in the men's 4 × 100 metres relay at the 2000 Summer Olympics.
