= Athletics at the 1993 Summer Universiade – Women's long jump =

The women's long jump event at the 1993 Summer Universiade was held at the UB Stadium in Buffalo, United States on 15 July 1993.

== Medalists ==
Gold	Silver	Bronze
Mirela Dulgheru; Romania	Vanessa Monar-Enweani; Canada	Daphne Saunders; Bahamas

== Results ==
=== Qualification ===
Rank	Group	Athlete	Nationality	Result	Notes
1	?	Daphne Saunders	Bahamas	6.51	
2	?	Mirela Dulgheru	Romania	6.49	
3	?	Dedra Davis	Bahamas	6.38	
4	?	Vanessa Monar-Enweani	Canada	6.36	
5	?	Christy Opara	Nigeria	6.32	
6	?	Viktoriya Vershynina	Ukraine	6.26	
7	?	Jeļena Blaževiča	Latvia	6.25	
8	?	Corinne Hérigault	France	6.23	
9	?	Chantal Brunner	New Zealand	6.23	
10	?	Trinette Johnson	United States	6.14	
11	?	Camille Jackson	United States	6.13	
12	?	Tamara Malešev	Independent Participants	6.07	
13	?	Monica Tóth	Romania	6.05	
14	?	Katrin Bartschat	Germany	6.04	
14	?	Nicole Devonish	Canada	6.04	
16	?	Kym Burns	Australia	6.03w	
17	?	Giannina Re	Italy	5.92	
18	?	Silvija Babić	Croatia	5.81	
19	?	Cristina Morujão	Portugal	5.69	
20	?	Sylvie Kaboré	Burkina Faso	5.63	
21	?	Yelena Savostyanova	Kazakhstan	5.43	
22	?	Feroza Khatoon	Bangladesh	4.85	

=== Final ===
Rank	Athlete	Nationality	Result	Notes
1st place, gold medalist(s)	Mirela Dulgheru	Romania	6.69 (w)	
2nd place, silver medalist(s)	Vanessa Monar-Enweani	Canada	6.57 (w)	
3rd place, bronze medalist(s)	Daphne Saunders	Bahamas	6.53	
4	Dedra Davis	Bahamas	6.49	
5	Viktoriya Vershynina	Ukraine	6.38	
6	Chantal Brunner	New Zealand	6.37	
7	Corinne Hérigault	France	6.35 (w)	
8	Christy Opara	Nigeria	6.30	
9	Jeļena Blaževiča	Latvia	6.30	
10	Trinette Johnson	United States	6.17	
11	Tamara Malešev	Independent Participants	5.88	
	Camille Jackson	United States	NM	
