= Cristina Vela =

Spanish cartoonist and illustrator (born 1983)

- Born: 22 December 1983 (age 42) Jaén, Spain
- Areas: Cartoonist, illustrator

Cristina Martos Vela (born 22 December 1983) is a Spanish cartoonist and illustrator.

== Career ==
Vela, still a teenager, joined the association Viñeta 6, dedicated to the promotion of comics in her hometown, and in whose magazines she collaborates. She studied fine arts in the specialty of painting and sculpture at the University of Seville, the city where she settled.

In 2008, Vela obtained a degree. She won first prize at the IX Fernando Quiñones National Competition, awarded by the Youth Department of the Cadiz City Council, for her work Madre, inspired by Peter Pan by J. M. Barrie. She also won second prize for comics from Caja Mediterránea. In 2009, she won the comic contest "Desencaja 2009" with her graphic novel Medusas y ballenas, with erotic overtones, published by Bizancio Ediciones. In 2010, she won the "Valencia Crea 2010" and exhibited at the Trindade gallery in Oporto, at the "Feria Arte Lisboa" and at the "XI Encuentro del Cómic y la Ilustración de Sevilla".
