= Francisco Galindo =

Mexican basketball player (born 1920)

Personal information
- Nationality: Mexican
- Born: 21 November 1920 Gómez Palacio, Mexico
- Died: before 2001

Sport
- Sport: Basketball

Francisco Galindo (21 November 1920 – before 2001) was a Mexican basketball player. He competed in the men's tournament at the 1948 Summer Olympics. Galindo was later the mayor of Gómez Palacio, Durango, and the hospital in Torreón was renamed in his honour.
