= Ricardo Diez (athlete) =

Venezuelan pole vaulter

Personal information
- Born: 29 March 1975 (age 51)

Sport
- Sport: Track and field
Medal record
Representing Venezuela
Central American and Caribbean Games
Silver medal – second place	1998 Maracaibo	Pole vault

Ricardo Diez (born 29 March 1975) is a retired Venezuelan athlete who specialised in the pole vault. He won several medals at regional level.

His personal best of 5.35 metres, set in 2000, is the standing national record.

He is now a coach in Singapore Sports School.

== Competition record ==
Year	Competition	Venue	Position	Notes
Representing Venezuela
1990	Central American and Caribbean; Junior Championships (U17)	Havana, Cuba	1st	3.90 m
1992	South American Junior Championships	Lima, Peru	1st	4.30 m
1993	South American Junior Championships	Puerto La Cruz, Venezuela	1st	4.70 m
1993	South American Championships	Lima, Peru	6th	4.60 m
1998	Ibero-American Championships	Lisbon, Portugal	5th	5.30 m
1998	Central American and Caribbean Games	Maracaibo, Venezuela	2nd	5.30 m
1999	South American Championships	Bogotá, Colombia	1st	5.20 m
1999	Pan American Games	Winnipeg, Canada	5th	5.10 m
2000	Ibero-American Championships	Rio de Janeiro, Brazil	–	NM
2001	South American Championships	Manaus, Brazil	2nd	5.35 m
2001	Central American and Caribbean Championships	Guatemala City, Guatemala	2nd	5.05 m
2002	Ibero-American Championships	Guatemala City, Guatemala	–	NM
2003	South American Championships	Barquisimeto, Venezuela	1st	5.20 m
2003	Central American and Caribbean Championships	St. George's, Grenada	2nd	5.00 m
2003	Pan American Games	Santo Domingo, Dominican Republic	6th	5.20 m
