= 2001 South American Championships in Athletics – Results =

These are the full results of the 2001 South American Championships in Athletics which took place on May 18–20, 2001, in Manaus, Brazil.

== Men's results ==
=== 100 meters ===
Heats – May 18
Wind:
Heat 1: +0.2 m/s, Heat 2: +0.2 m/s

Rank	Heat	Name	Nationality	Time	Notes
1	2	Raphael de Oliveira	Brazil	10.32	Q
2	1	Cláudio Roberto Souza	Brazil	10.42	Q
3	1	Heber Viera	Uruguay	10.43	Q
4	1	Gabriel Simon	Argentina	10.47	Q
5	2	Rawle Greene	Guyana	10.53	Q
6	2	Helly Ollarves	Venezuela	10.62	Q
7	1	José Peña	Venezuela	10.63	q
8	2	Rubén Techeira	Uruguay	10.69	q
9	1	Rodrigo Roach	Chile	10.77	
11	2	Cristián Gutiérrez	Ecuador	10.93	
12	2	Guillermo Dongo	Suriname	10.99	

Final – May 18
Wind:
+0.2 m/s

Rank	Name	Nationality	Time	Notes
1st place, gold medalist(s)	Raphael de Oliveira	Brazil	10.36	
2nd place, silver medalist(s)	Cláudio Roberto Souza	Brazil	10.37	
3rd place, bronze medalist(s)	Heber Viera	Uruguay	10.37	
4	Rawle Greene	Guyana	10.49	
5	José Peña	Venezuela	10.50	
6	Rubén Techeira	Uruguay	10.66	
7	Helly Ollarves	Venezuela	10.87	
	Gabriel Simon	Argentina	DNF	

=== 200 meters ===
Heats – May 20
Wind:
Heat 1: +0.1 m/s, Heat 2: +0.3 m/s

Rank	Heat	Name	Nationality	Time	Notes
1	2	Heber Viera	Uruguay	20.83	Q
2	2	Augusto de Oliveira	Brazil	20.93	Q
3	1	André da Silva	Brazil	21.26	Q
4	1	Ricardo Roach	Chile	21.28	Q
5	1	Rawle Greene	Guyana	21.44	Q
6	2	Rodrigo Roach	Chile	21.47	Q
7	1	Cristián Gutiérrez	Ecuador	21.57	q
8	1	Rubén Techeira	Uruguay	21.69	q
9	2	José Carabalí	Venezuela	21.74	
10	2	Guillermo Dongo	Suriname	22.44	

Final – May 20
Wind:
0.0 m/s

Rank	Name	Nationality	Time	Notes
1st place, gold medalist(s)	André da Silva	Brazil	20.52	
2nd place, silver medalist(s)	Heber Viera	Uruguay	20.68	NR
3rd place, bronze medalist(s)	Augusto de Oliveira	Brazil	21.02	
4	Rawle Greene	Guyana	21.22	
5	Cristián Gutiérrez	Ecuador	21.59	
6	Rodrigo Roach	Chile	21.67	
7	Rubén Techeira	Uruguay	21.68	
	Ricardo Roach	Chile	?	

=== 400 meters ===
May 19

Rank	Name	Nationality	Time	Notes
1st place, gold medalist(s)	Sanderlei Parrela	Brazil	45.11	CR
2nd place, silver medalist(s)	Valdinei da Silva	Brazil	46.50	
3rd place, bronze medalist(s)	Jonathan Palma	Venezuela	46.78	
4	Gustavo Aguirre	Argentina	46.93	
5	William Hernández	Venezuela	47.66	
6	Richard Ayoví	Ecuador	48.86	

=== 800 meters ===
May 18

Rank	Name	Nationality	Time	Notes
1st place, gold medalist(s)	Hudson de Souza	Brazil	1:47.20	
2nd place, silver medalist(s)	Flávio Godoy	Brazil	1:47.65	
3rd place, bronze medalist(s)	Simoncito Silvera	Venezuela	1:48.54	
4	Alfredo Escobar	Venezuela	1:49.05	
5	Sebastián González Cabot	Argentina	1:50.16	
6	Danielo Estefan	Uruguay	1:51.39	
7	Fadrique Iglesias	Bolivia	1:52.19	NR
8	Paulo de la Camara	Chile	1:52.52	

=== 1500 meters ===
May 20

Rank	Name	Nationality	Time	Notes
1st place, gold medalist(s)	Hudson de Souza	Brazil	3:36.47	CR
2nd place, silver medalist(s)	Edgar de Oliveira	Brazil	3:43.56	
3rd place, bronze medalist(s)	Sebastián González Cabot	Argentina	3:45.35	
4	Emidgio Delgado	Venezuela	3:46.28	
5	Julián Peralta	Argentina	3:48.62	
6	Bayron Piedra	Ecuador	3:52.42	
7	Said Gomez	Panama	3:58.54	

=== 5000 meters ===
May 19

Rank	Name	Nationality	Time	Notes
1st place, gold medalist(s)	Elenilson da Silva	Brazil	14:10.94	
2nd place, silver medalist(s)	José Saraiva Frazão Júnior	Brazil	14:25.35	
3rd place, bronze medalist(s)	Alejandro Semprum	Venezuela	14:32.90	
4	Gustavo Pereira	Uruguay	15:05.46	
5	Said Gomez	Panama	15:10.66	
6	Bayron Piedra	Ecuador	15:38.71	
7	Colin Mercurius	Guyana	16:46.89	
8	Lionel D'Andrade	Guyana	16:47.42	
	Fernando Alex Fernandes	Brazil	14:44.21	

=== 10,000 meters ===
May 20

Rank	Name	Nationality	Time	Notes
1st place, gold medalist(s)	Néstor García	Uruguay	30:17.09	
2nd place, silver medalist(s)	Alejandro Semprum	Venezuela	30:24.56	
3rd place, bronze medalist(s)	Oscar Cortínez	Argentina	31:12.45	
4	Oscar Amaya	Argentina	31:33.48	
5	Lionel D'Andrade	Guyana	35:44.31	
	Ramiro Nogueira Filho	Brazil	DNF	
	Colin Mercurius	Guyana	DNF	
	Washington Veleda	Uruguay	DNF	

=== 110 meters hurdles ===
May 19
Wind: 0.0 m/s

Rank	Name	Nationality	Time	Notes
1st place, gold medalist(s)	Márcio de Souza	Brazil	13.64	CR
2nd place, silver medalist(s)	Redelén dos Santos	Brazil	13.87	
3rd place, bronze medalist(s)	Paulo Villar	Colombia	13.88	NR
4	Jackson Quiñónez	Ecuador	13.94	NR
5	Marleán Reina	Venezuela	14.48	

=== 400 meters hurdles ===
May 18

Rank	Name	Nationality	Time	Notes
1st place, gold medalist(s)	Anderson Costa dos Santos	Brazil	50.48	
2nd place, silver medalist(s)	Carlos Zbinden	Chile	50.99	
3rd place, bronze medalist(s)	João Carlos dos Santos	Brazil	51.04	
4	José Turbay	Venezuela	51.91	
5	Gabriel Heredia	Argentina	51.98	
6	Luis Montenegro	Chile	52.24	
	Richard Ayoví	Ecuador	DNF	

=== 3000 meters steeplechase ===
May 19

Rank	Name	Nationality	Time	Notes
1st place, gold medalist(s)	Celso Ficagna	Brazil	8:44.83	
2nd place, silver medalist(s)	Emidgio Delgado	Venezuela	8:47.55	
3rd place, bronze medalist(s)	Adelar José Schuler	Brazil	8:51.70	
4	Julián Peralta	Argentina	8:54.51	
5	Mariano Tarilo	Argentina	9:33.25	

=== 4 x 100 meters relay ===
May 19

Rank	Nation	Competitors	Time	Notes
1st place, gold medalist(s)	Brazil	Raphael de Oliveira, Cláudio Roberto Souza, Vicente de Lima, André da Silva	38.67	
2nd place, silver medalist(s)	Venezuela	Juan Morillo, José Peña, José Carabalí, Helly Ollarves	40.02	
3rd place, bronze medalist(s)	Uruguay	Heber Viera, Rubén Techeira, Danielo Estefan, José Daniel García	40.34	
4	Ecuador	Wílmer Cortez, Richard Ayoví, Jackson Quiñónez, Cristián Gutiérrez	41.71	
5	Chile	Diego Moraya, Claudio Bossay, Felipe Apablaza, Ricardo Roach	42.06	

=== 4 x 400 meters relay ===
May 20

Rank	Nation	Competitors	Time	Notes
1st place, gold medalist(s)	Venezuela	Jonathan Palma, Luis Luna, Simoncito Silvera, William Hernández	3:06.31	
2nd place, silver medalist(s)	Brazil	Valdinei da Silva, Luís Antônio Elói, Anderson Jorge dos Santos, Flávio Godoy	3:06.64	
3rd place, bronze medalist(s)	Argentina	Gustavo Aguirre, Sebastián González Cabot, Gabriel Heredia, Eric Kerwitz	3:13.88	
4	Chile	Claudio Bossai, Paulo de la Camara, Carlos Zbinden, Luis Montenegro	3:16.33	
5	Ecuador	Bayron Piedra, Cristiàn Gutiérrez, Richard Ayoví, Wílmer Cortez	3:18.52	

=== 20,000 meters walk ===
May 19

Rank	Name	Nationality	Time	Notes
1st place, gold medalist(s)	José Alessandro Bagio	Brazil	1:31:42.9	
2nd place, silver medalist(s)	Mário dos Santos	Brazil	1:32:45.9	
3rd place, bronze medalist(s)	Xavier Moreno	Ecuador	1:35:42.5	
4	Cristian Muñoz	Chile	1:36:46.1	
5	Patricio Villacorte	Ecuador	1:37:18.2	
6	Julian Choque	Bolivia	1:38:36.7	
7	Marco Taype	Peru	1:44:10.5	

=== High jump ===
May 18

Rank	Name	Nationality	2.05	2.10	2.15	2.20	2.23	Result	Notes
1st place, gold medalist(s)	Jessé de Lima	Brazil	–	o	o	xo	xxx	2.20	
2nd place, silver medalist(s)	Alfredo Deza	Peru	o	o	o	xxo	xxx	2.20	
3rd place, bronze medalist(s)	Felipe Apablaza	Chile	–	o	xxo	xxx		2.15	
4	Erasmo Jara	Argentina	o	o	xxx			2.10	
5	Fabrício Romero	Brazil	o	xxx				2.05	
5	Franco Moy	Peru	o	xxx				2.05	
7	Mário Guerci	Argentina	xxo	xxx				2.05	

=== Pole vault ===
May 20

Rank	Name	Nationality	4.60	4.70	4.80	4.90	5.00	5.10	5.15	5.20	5.25	5.30	5.35	5.40	5.50	Result	Notes
1st place, gold medalist(s)	Javier Benítez	Argentina	–	–	–	–	xo	o	–	o	–	x–	o	xo	xxx	5.40	CR
2nd place, silver medalist(s)	Ricardo Diez	Venezuela	–	–	xo	–	o	–	o	–	xo	o	xo	xxx		5.35	NR
3rd place, bronze medalist(s)	Gustavo Rehder	Brazil	–	–	xo	–	o	–	o	–	xx–	x				5.15	
4	José Francisco Nava	Chile	–	–	o	–	xo	o	–	xxx						5.10	
5	Marcelo Terra	Argentina	xo	–	o	xxx										4.80	
5	Fábio Gomes da Silva	Brazil	xo	–	o	–	xxx									4.80	
	Valdemir Silva	Brazil	–	o	o	–	o	xxx								5.00	
	Jorge Naranjo	Chile	–	–	–	xxx										NM	

=== Long jump ===
May 19

Rank	Name	Nationality	#1	#2	#3	#4	#5	#6	Result	Notes
1st place, gold medalist(s)	Nélson Carlos Ferreira	Brazil	x	x	x	7.63	7.67	7.66	7.67	
2nd place, silver medalist(s)	Lewis Asprilla	Colombia	7.16	7.40	7.48w	x	x	7.11	7.48w	
3rd place, bronze medalist(s)	Esteban Copland	Venezuela	6.90	7.31	x	7.20	7.19	x	7.31	
4	Claudio Bossay	Chile	x	7.20	x	7.26	x	7.20	7.26	
5	Jadel Gregório	Brazil	x	x	7.22	x	x	7.02	7.22	
6	Leandro Simes	Argentina	6.97	7.17	x	7.09	7.00	7.00	7.17	
7	José Reyes	Venezuela	6.88	7.17	x	–	–	–	7.17	

=== Triple jump ===
May 20

Rank	Name	Nationality	#1	#2	#3	#4	#5	#6	Result	Notes
1st place, gold medalist(s)	Jadel Gregório	Brazil	16.98	x	16.81	x	x	16.59	16.98	
2nd place, silver medalist(s)	Messias José Baptista	Brazil	x	16.21	–	16.23	x	16.21	16.23	
3rd place, bronze medalist(s)	Freddy Nieves	Ecuador	15.40	15.76	16.14	15.48	x	15.64	16.14	
4	Johnny Rodríguez	Venezuela	15.19	15.85	15.56	15.78	x	-	15.85	
5	Leandro Simes	Argentina	14.84	x	x	15.48	x	x	15.48	
6	Felipe Apablaza	Chile	14.75	x	x	15.02	x	15.07	15.07	
7	Franco Moy	Peru	13.98	14.24	13.73	–	13.99	–	14.24	

=== Shot put ===
May 19

Rank	Name	Nationality	#1	#2	#3	#4	#5	#6	Result	Notes
1st place, gold medalist(s)	Marco Antonio Verni	Chile	18.57	18.53	x	x	x	x	18.57	
2nd place, silver medalist(s)	Yojer Medina	Venezuela	17.20	18.14	17.71	17.90	18.49	18.06	18.49	
3rd place, bronze medalist(s)	Édson Miguel	Brazil	16.33	x	16.77	17.00	16.05	16.59	17.00	
4	Andrés Calvo	Argentina	14.18	16.64	17.00	14.51	–	–	17.00	
5	Juan Tello	Peru	14.12	14.51	14.95	x	x	14.79	14.95	

=== Discus throw ===
May 20

Rank	Name	Nationality	#1	#2	#3	#4	#5	#6	Result	Notes
1st place, gold medalist(s)	Marcelo Pugliese	Argentina	56.30	56.16	56.26	x	x	54.09	56.30	
2nd place, silver medalist(s)	João Joaquim dos Santos	Brazil	52.07	x	52.78	49.73	53.28	54.40	54.40	
3rd place, bronze medalist(s)	Julio Piñero	Argentina	49.81	54.10	53.09	x	x	52.24	54.10	
4	Marco Antonio Verni	Chile	49.56	47.71	47.66	48.46	48.42	x	49.56	
5	Héctor Hurtado	Venezuela	49.34	x	46.20	49.08	48.38	x	49.34	
6	Juan Tello	Peru	48.28	x	48.64	48.89	49.20	47.90	49.20	

=== Hammer throw ===
May 20

Rank	Name	Nationality	#1	#2	#3	#4	#5	#6	Result	Notes
1st place, gold medalist(s)	Juan Ignacio Cerra	Argentina	x	x	73.95	x	73.80	x	73.95	CR
2nd place, silver medalist(s)	Adrián Marzo	Argentina	67.82	x	x	69.69	69.34	69.03	69.69	
3rd place, bronze medalist(s)	Eduardo Acuña	Peru	62.66	61.74	63.53	59.90	63.10	62.13	63.53	
4	Patricio Palma	Chile	62.91	x	61.85	x	63.26	61.12	63.26	
5	Mário Leme	Brazil	59.08	61.23	61.10	58.58	60.09	x	61.23	
6	Marcos dos Santos	Brazil	x	x	x	57.97	57.56	57.24	57.97	
7	Roberto Sáez	Chile	52.10	52.35	53.54	55.81	54.24	50.69	55.81	

=== Javelin throw ===
May 18

Rank	Name	Nationality	#1	#2	#3	#4	#5	#6	Result	Notes
1st place, gold medalist(s)	Luiz Fernando da Silva	Brazil	74.50	–	71.96	–	–	–	74.50	
2nd place, silver medalist(s)	Nery Kennedy	Paraguay	73.85	73.99	74.41	x	x	68.88	74.41	
3rd place, bronze medalist(s)	Manuel Fuenmayor	Venezuela	71.44	67.61	x	68.26	68.78	x	71.44	
4	Diego Moraga	Chile	68.72	70.07	64.76	69.48	67.67	x	70.07	
5	Pablo Pietrobelli	Argentina	66.47	67.15	68.17	68.64	68.42	68.30	68.64	
6	Flávio de Souza	Brazil	68.22	x	65.03	x	62.19	x	68.22	
7	Edmundo Fernández	Ecuador	54.02	x	54.19	57.50	58.48	60.32	60.32	

=== Decathlon ===
May 18–19

The highest mark recorded in each event is highlighted in yellow

Rank	Athlete	Nationality	100m	LJ	SP	HJ	400m	110m H	DT	PV	JT	1500m	Points	Notes
1st place, gold medalist(s)	Edson Bindilatti	Brazil	11.13	6.96	12.46	2.08	47.85	15.18	37.94	4.60	44.24	4:28.37	7564	CR
2nd place, silver medalist(s)	Eric Kerwitz	Argentina	11.08	7.18	12.30	1.90	48.99	15.38	34.02	4.30	58.01	4:45.47	7305	
3rd place, bronze medalist(s)	Enrique Aguirre	Argentina	11.36	6.62	13.45	2.02	49.99	15.42	38.80	4.20	51.40	4:42.30	7226	
4	Emerson Vaz Viana	Brazil	11.53	7.02	11.50	1.99	51.61	15.70	36.35	4.30	61.44	4:44.88	7146	
5	Cristián Lyon	Chile	11.46	6.66	11.79	1.87	52.59	15.60	37.94	4.50	35.75	5:19.09	6472	
6	Wílmer Cortez	Ecuador	11.57	6.53	10.04	1.87	51.27	18.18	28.94	3.00	37.08	4:28.07	5839	

== Women's results ==
=== 100 meters ===
May 18
Wind: +0.6 m/s

Rank	Name	Nationality	Time	Notes
1st place, gold medalist(s)	Lucimar de Moura	Brazil	11.55	
2nd place, silver medalist(s)	María Izabel Coloma	Chile	11.79	
3rd place, bronze medalist(s)	Rosemar Coelho Neto	Brazil	11.79	
4	Digna Luz Murillo	Colombia	11.80	
5	Wilmary Álvarez	Venezuela	11.97	
6	Vanesa Wohlgemuth	Argentina	12.14	
7	Rosa Cabezas	Ecuador	12.62	
	Katia Benth	French Guiana	11.48	

=== 200 meters ===
May 20
Wind: 0.0 m/s

Rank	Name	Nationality	Time	Notes
1st place, gold medalist(s)	Felipa Palacios	Colombia	23.36	
2nd place, silver medalist(s)	Rosemar Coelho Neto	Brazil	23.52	
3rd place, bronze medalist(s)	Lucimar de Moura	Brazil	23.68	
4	María Izabel Coloma	Chile	24.59	
5	Wilmary Álvarez	Venezuela	24.65	
6	Vanesa Wohlgemuth	Argentina	25.10	
7	Digna Luz Murillo	Colombia	25.64	
8	Rosa Cabezas	Ecuador	25.96	

=== 400 meters ===
May 19

Rank	Name	Nationality	Time	Notes
1st place, gold medalist(s)	Luciana Mendes	Brazil	52.76	
2nd place, silver medalist(s)	Maria Laura Almirão	Brazil	53.14	
3rd place, bronze medalist(s)	Norma González	Colombia	53.29	
4	Felipa Palacios	Colombia	54.62	
5	Eliana Pacheco	Venezuela	55.80	
6	Lucy Jaramillo	Ecuador	57.93	
7	Mariella Álvarez	Peru	58.24	

=== 800 meters ===
May 18

Rank	Name	Nationality	Time	Notes
1st place, gold medalist(s)	Luciana Mendes	Brazil	2:00.04	CR
2nd place, silver medalist(s)	Letitia Vriesde	Suriname	2:00.93	
3rd place, bronze medalist(s)	Marlene da Silva	Brazil	2:05.82	
4	Rosibel García	Colombia	2:07.42	
5	Mercy Colorado	Ecuador	2:08.83	
6	Mariella Álvarez	Peru	2:09.55	
7	Jenny Mejías	Venezuela	2:12.21	

=== 1500 meters ===
May 20

Rank	Name	Nationality	Time	Notes
1st place, gold medalist(s)	Letitia Vriesde	Suriname	4:19.97	
2nd place, silver medalist(s)	Célia Regina dos Santos	Brazil	4:23.91	
3rd place, bronze medalist(s)	Andréa Celeste da Silva	Brazil	4:28.01	
4	Valeria Rodríguez	Argentina	4:32.89	
5	Mercy Colorado	Ecuador	4:42.25	

=== 5000 meters ===
May 19

Rank	Name	Nationality	Time	Notes
1st place, gold medalist(s)	Maria Cristina Rodrigues	Brazil	16:35.1	
2nd place, silver medalist(s)	Selma Cândida dos Reis	Brazil	16:40.0	
3rd place, bronze medalist(s)	María Paredes	Ecuador	16:53.5	
4	Tania Poma	Bolivia	17:03.0	
5	Valeria Rodríguez	Argentina	17:04.4	
6	Raquel Aceituno	Peru	17:39.9	

=== 10,000 meters ===
May 19

Rank	Name	Nationality	Time	Notes
1st place, gold medalist(s)	Maria Cristina Rodrigues	Brazil	35:25.70	
2nd place, silver medalist(s)	Rosa Apaza	Bolivia	35:30.04	
3rd place, bronze medalist(s)	Adriana de Souza	Brazil	35:30.06	
4	María Paredes	Ecuador	36:28.16	
5	Raquel Aceituno	Peru	36:31.78	

=== 100 meters hurdles ===
May 20
Wind: +0.1 m/s

Rank	Name	Nationality	Time	Notes
1st place, gold medalist(s)	Maurren Maggi	Brazil	12.71	AR, CR
2nd place, silver medalist(s)	Maíla Machado	Brazil	13.18	
3rd place, bronze medalist(s)	Sandrine Legenort	Venezuela	13.88	
4	Princesa Oliveros	Colombia	13.89	
5	Carolina Torres	Chile	14.21	
6	Francisca Guzmán	Chile	14.30	

=== 400 meters hurdles ===
May 18

Rank	Name	Nationality	Time	Notes
1st place, gold medalist(s)	Isabel Silva	Brazil	57.47	
2nd place, silver medalist(s)	Princesa Oliveros	Colombia	58.76	
3rd place, bronze medalist(s)	Luciana França	Brazil	58.87	
4	Yusmely García	Venezuela	1:00.56	
5	Lucy Jaramillo	Ecuador	1:05.48	

=== 3000 meters steeplechase ===
May 20

Rank	Name	Nationality	Time	Notes
1st place, gold medalist(s)	Michelle Costa	Brazil	10:31.30	
2nd place, silver medalist(s)	Claudia Camargo	Argentina	10:58.81	
3rd place, bronze medalist(s)	Magda Margarete Azevedo	Brazil	11:03.95	
4	Marlene Acuña	Ecuador	11:08.05	
	Soraya Telles-Teixeira	Brazil	11:19.26	
	María Peralta	Argentina	DNF	

=== 4 x 100 meters relay ===
May 19

Rank	Nation	Competitors	Time	Notes
1st place, gold medalist(s)	Brazil	Lucimar de Moura, Rosemar Coelho Neto, Kátia Regina Santos, Thatiana Regina Ignâcio	44.32	
2nd place, silver medalist(s)	Colombia	Norma González, Digna Luz Murillo, Princesa Oliveros, Felipa Palacios	45.43	
3rd place, bronze medalist(s)	Venezuela	Jennifer Arveláez, Sandrine Legenort, Yusmely García, Wilmary Álvarez	47.22	
4	Chile	Francisca Guzmán, Carolina Torres, María Paz Ausin, María Izabel Coloma	48.81	
5	Ecuador	Lucy Jaramillo, Tamara Martínez, Mercy Colorado, Rosa Cabezas	49.27	
	Argentina	Alina Alló, Vanesa Wohlgemuth, Solange Witteveen, Alejandra García	DQ	

=== 4 x 400 meters relay ===
May 20

Rank	Nation	Competitors	Time	Notes
1st place, gold medalist(s)	Brazil	Maria Laura Almirão, Maria Figueirêdo, Lucimar Teodoro, Luciana Mendes	3:32.43	CR
2nd place, silver medalist(s)	Colombia	Felipa Palacios, Norma González, Rosibel García, Princesa Oliveros	3:40.27	
3rd place, bronze medalist(s)	Venezuela	Wilmary Álvarez, Eliana Pacheco, Yusmely García, Jenny Mejías	3:44.74	NR
4	Ecuador	Rosa Cabezas, Tamara Martínez, Mercy Colorado, Lucy Jaramillo	3:50.71	

=== 20,000 meters walk ===
May 18

Rank	Name	Nationality	Time	Notes
1st place, gold medalist(s)	Geovana Irusta	Bolivia	1:42:42.4	
2nd place, silver medalist(s)	Gianetti Bonfim	Brazil	1:46:02.1	
3rd place, bronze medalist(s)	Cristina Bohórquez	Colombia	1:48:18.8	
4	Tânia Spindler	Brazil	1:54:09.0	
5	Luisa Paltín	Ecuador	2:01:17.3	

=== High jump ===
May 19

Rank	Name	Nationality	1.65	1.70	1.75	1.80	1.83	1.86	1.89	1.92	1.95	1.97	1.99	Result	Notes
1st place, gold medalist(s)	Luciane Dambacher	Brazil	o	o	o	o	xo	xxx						1.83	
1st place, gold medalist(s)	Thaís de Andrade	Brazil	o	o	o	o	xo	xxx						1.83	
	~~Solange Witteveen~~	~~Argentina~~	~~o~~	~~o~~	~~o~~	~~o~~	~~o~~	~~o~~	~~xxo~~	~~o~~	~~o~~	~~o~~	~~xxx~~	~~1.97~~	DQ

=== Pole vault ===
May 18

Rank	Name	Nationality	3.40	3.50	3.60	3.70	3.80	3.90	4.00	4.10	Result	Notes
1st place, gold medalist(s)	Alejandra García	Argentina	–	–	–	–	–	–	o	xxx	4.00	
2nd place, silver medalist(s)	Alina Alló	Argentina	–	o	o	o	o	o	xxx		3.90	
3rd place, bronze medalist(s)	María Paz Ausin	Chile	o	o	o	o	xxx				3.70	
3rd place, bronze medalist(s)	Karem da Silva	Brazil	–	–	o	o	xxx				3.70	
5	Carolina Torres	Chile	–	o	xo	xo	xxx				3.70	
6	Fabiana Murer	Brazil	–	–	xo	xxo	xxx				3.70	
7	Aliusha Díaz	Uruguay	xo	xxx							3.40	

=== Long jump ===
May 18

Rank	Name	Nationality	#1	#2	#3	#4	#5	#6	Result	Notes
1st place, gold medalist(s)	Maurren Maggi	Brazil	6.45	6.48	6.69	6.32	–	x	6.69	
2nd place, silver medalist(s)	Luciana dos Santos	Brazil	5.81	6.10	5.89	6.04	5.91	x	6.10	
3rd place, bronze medalist(s)	Helena Guerrero	Colombia	5.77	5.95	6.04	5.81	6.03	5.93	6.04	
4	Mónica Falcioni	Uruguay	5.94	5.92	6.00	5.97	6.00	5.97	6.00	
5	Andrea Ávila	Argentina	5.79	5.93	x	5.61	5.99	5.73	5.99	
6	Jennifer Arveláez	Venezuela	5.68	5.82	5.66	5.76	x	5.75	5.82	

=== Triple jump ===
May 19

Rank	Name	Nationality	#1	#2	#3	#4	#5	#6	Result	Notes
1st place, gold medalist(s)	Keila Costa	Brazil	12.58	x	13.43	13.61	x	x	13.61	
2nd place, silver medalist(s)	Luciana dos Santos	Brazil	12.82	13.36	13.32	x	x	13.48	13.48	
3rd place, bronze medalist(s)	Mónica Falcioni	Uruguay	12.65	13.22	13.10	13.37	13.43	13.38	13.43	
4	Jennifer Arveláez	Venezuela	13.06	12.73	x	–	13.21	13.35	13.35	

=== Shot put ===
May 18

Rank	Name	Nationality	#1	#2	#3	#4	#5	#6	Result	Notes
1st place, gold medalist(s)	Elisângela Adriano	Brazil	17.47	x	x	17.29	17.93	17.48	17.93	
2nd place, silver medalist(s)	Andréa Maria Pereira	Brazil	15.64	15.15	x	15.10	15.10	15.12	15.64	
3rd place, bronze medalist(s)	Marianne Berndt	Chile	15.38	14.85	14.46	15.21	x	x	15.38	
4	Neolanis Suárez	Venezuela	13.67	13.40	13.78	x	13.03	x	13.78	
5	Valeria Steffens	Chile	12.07	12.41	11.80	12.42	11.91	12.15	12.42	

=== Discus throw ===
May 19

Rank	Name	Nationality	#1	#2	#3	#4	#5	#6	Result	Notes
1st place, gold medalist(s)	Elisângela Adriano	Brazil	58.32	56.71	x	x	x	58.40	58.40	
2nd place, silver medalist(s)	Katiuscia de Jesus	Brazil	43.97	49.52	44.94	44.08	45.18	x	49.52	
3rd place, bronze medalist(s)	María Eugenia Giggi	Argentina	46.96	47.66	x	45.79	48.30	47.08	48.30	
4	Neolanis Suárez	Venezuela	44.76	46.99	x	47.68	47.70	46.97	47.70	
5	Marianne Berndt	Chile	38.81	x	x	36.47	42.68	41.71	42.68	

=== Hammer throw ===
May 19

Rank	Name	Nationality	#1	#2	#3	#4	#5	#6	Result	Notes
1st place, gold medalist(s)	Karina Moya	Argentina	x	60.64	60.83	x	57.35	59.90	60.83	CR
2nd place, silver medalist(s)	Josiane Soares	Brazil	52.88	56.70	58.10	57.44	56.28	58.81	58.81	
3rd place, bronze medalist(s)	Erika Melián	Argentina	45.94	52.93	55.70	x	x	x	55.70	
4	María Eugenia Villamizar	Colombia	55.57	54.44	52.65	x	52.99	52.60	55.57	
5	Katiuscia de Jesus	Brazil	52.14	54.82	52.30	54.38	53.53	52.20	54.82	
6	Odette Palma	Chile	x	41.54	51.78	46.99	x	48.46	51.78	NR
7	Adriana Benaventa	Venezuela	x	47.36	x	50.18	50.12	48.83	50.18	

=== Javelin throw ===
May 18

Rank	Name	Nationality	#1	#2	#3	#4	#5	#6	Result	Notes
1st place, gold medalist(s)	Carla Bispo	Brazil	51.03	49.48	49.32	49.48	51.98	–	51.98	
2nd place, silver medalist(s)	Alessandra Resende	Brazil	48.47	48.37	50.83	48.98	x	48.37	50.83	
3rd place, bronze medalist(s)	Romina Maggi	Argentina	45.63	47.23	48.28	46.39	45.98	48.90	48.90	

=== Heptathlon ===
May 19–20

The highest mark recorded in each event is highlighted in yellow

Rank	Athlete	Nationality	100m H	HJ	SP	200m	LJ	JT	800m	Points	Notes
1st place, gold medalist(s)	Elizete da Silva	Brazil	14.82	1.67	11.45	25.77	5.60	39.05	2:19.25	5338	
2nd place, silver medalist(s)	Valeria Steffens	Chile	15.48	1.64	12.66	26.01	5.43	35.74	2:19.69	5157	
3rd place, bronze medalist(s)	Mônica Marques	Brazil	15.36	1.73	12.47	26.34	5.61	35.03	2:31.43	5125	
4	María Cecília Marcobechio	Argentina	16.26	1.46	11.82	28.03	5.20	28.28	2:27.92	4314	
5	Tamara Martínez	Ecuador	16.84	1.46	10.51	25.96	4.96	20.55	2:25.50	4153	
