= 2001 South American Championships in Athletics =

41st South American Championships
- Dates: 18–20 May 2001
- Host city: Manaus, Brazil
- Venue: Vila Olímpica de Manaus
- Events: 44
- Participation: 217 athletes from 14 nations
- Records set: 10 CR's

The 2001 South American Championships in Athletics were held at the Vila Olímpica in Manaus, Brazil, from May 18–20.

== Medal summary ==
=== Men's events ===
Event	Gold		Silver		Bronze	
100 metres	Raphael de Oliveira; Brazil	10.36	Cláudio Sousa; Brazil	10.37	Heber Viera; Uruguay	10.37
200 metres	André da Silva; Brazil	20.52	Heber Viera; Uruguay	20.68	Augusto de Oliveira; Brazil	21.02
400 metres	Sanderlei Parrela; Brazil	45.11 CR	Valdinei da Silva; Brazil	46.50	Jonathan Palma; Venezuela	46.78
800 metres	Hudson de Souza; Brazil	1:47.20	Flavio Godoy; Brazil	1:47.65	Simoncito Silvera; Venezuela	1:48.54
1500 metres	Hudson de Souza; Brazil	3:36.47 CR	Edgar de Oliveira; Brazil	3:43.56	Sebastián González Cabot; Argentina	3:45.35
5000 metres	Elenilson da Silva; Brazil	14:10.94	José Frazão; Brazil	14:25.35	José Alejandro Semprún; Venezuela	14:32.90
10,000 metres	Néstor García; Uruguay	30:17.09	José Alejandro Semprún; Venezuela	30:24.56	Oscar Cortínez; Argentina	31:12.45
3000 metres steeplechase	Celso Ficagna; Brazil	8:44.83	Emigdio Delgado; Venezuela	8:47.55	Adelar Schuler; Brazil	8:51.70
110 metres hurdles	Márcio de Souza; Brazil	13.64 CR	Redelen dos Santos; Brazil	13.87	Paulo Villar; Colombia	13.88
400 metres hurdles	Anderson Costa dos Santos; Brazil	50.48	Carlos Zbinden; Chile	50.99	João Carlos dos Santos; Brazil	51.04
4 × 100 metres relay	Brazil; Raphael de Oliveira; Cláudio Roberto Souza; Vicente de Lima; André da Silva	38.67	Venezuela; Juan Morillo; José Peña; José Carabalí; Helly Ollarves	40.02	Uruguay; Heber Viera; Rubén Techeira; Danielo Estefan; José Daniel García	40.34
4 × 400 metres relay	Venezuela; Jonathan Palma; Luis Luna; Simoncito Silvera; William Hernández	3:06.31	Brazil; Valdinei da Silva; Luís Antônio Elói; Anderson Jorge dos Santos; Flávio Godoy	3:06.64	Argentina; Gustavo Aguirre; Sebastián González Cabot; Gabriel Heredia; Eric Kerwitz	3:13.88
20,000 metres track walk	José Alessandro Bagio; Brazil	1:31:42.84	Mário dos Santos; Brazil	1:32:45.90	Xavier Moreno; Ecuador	1:35:42.11
High jump	Jessé de Lima; Brazil	2.20	Alfredo Deza; Peru	2.20	Felipe Apablaza; Chile	2.15
Pole vault	Javier Benítez; Argentina	5.40 CR	Ricardo Diez; Venezuela	5.35 =NR	Gustavo Rehder; Brazil	5.15
Long jump	Nelson Ferreira; Brazil	7.67	Lewis Asprilla; Colombia	7.48w	Esteban Copland; Venezuela	7.31
Triple jump	Jadel Gregório; Brazil	16.98	Messias José Baptista; Brazil	16.23	Freddy Nieves; Ecuador	16.14
Shot put	Marco Antonio Verni; Chile	18.57	Yojer Medina; Venezuela	18.49	Édson Miguel; Brazil	17.00
Discus throw	Marcelo Pugliese; Argentina	56.30	João Joaquim dos Santos; Brazil	54.40	Julio Piñero; Argentina	54.10
Hammer throw	Juan Cerra; Argentina	73.95 CR	Adrián Marzo; Argentina	69.69	Eduardo Acuña; Peru	63.53
Javelin throw	Luiz Fernando da Silva; Brazil	74.50	Nery Kennedy; Paraguay	74.41	Manuel Fuenmayor; Venezuela	71.44
Decathlon	Édson Bindilatti; Brazil	7564	Eric Kerwitz; Argentina	7305	Enrique Aguirre; Argentina	7226
WR world record | AR area record | CR championship record | GR games record | NR national record | OR Olympic record | PB personal best | SB season best | WL world leading (in a given season)

=== Women's events ===
Event	Gold		Silver		Bronze	
100 metres	Lucimar de Moura; Brazil	11.55	María Isabel Coloma; Chile	11.79	Rosemar Coelho; Brazil	11.79
200 metres	Felipa Palacios; Colombia	23.36	Rosemar Coelho; Brazil	23.52	Lucimar de Moura; Brazil	23.68
400 metres	Luciana Mendes; Brazil	52.76	Maria Laura Almirao; Brazil	53.14	Norma González; Colombia	53.29
800 metres	Luciana Mendes; Brazil	2:00.04 CR	Letitia Vriesde; Suriname	2:00.93	Marlene da Silva; Brazil	2:05.82
1500 metres	Letitia Vriesde; Suriname	4:19.97	Célia dos Santos; Brazil	4:23.91	Andréa da Silva; Brazil	4:28.01
5000 metres	Maria Rodrigues; Brazil	16:35.1	Selma dos Reis; Brazil	16:40.0	María Paredes; Ecuador	16:53.5
10,000 metres	Maria Rodrigues; Brazil	35:25.70	Rosa Apaza; Bolivia	35:30.04	Adriana de Souza; Brazil	35:30.06
3000 metres steeplechase	Michelle Costa; Brazil	10:31.30 CR	Claudia Camargo; Argentina	10:58.81	Magda Azevedo; Brazil	11:03.95
100 metres hurdles	Maurren Maggi; Brazil	12.71 AR CR	Maíla Machado; Brazil	13.18	Sandrine Legenort; Venezuela	13.88
400 metres hurdles	Isabel Silva; Brazil	57.47	Princesa Oliveros; Colombia	58.76	Luciana França; Brazil	58.87
4 × 100 metres relay	Brazil; Lucimar de Moura; Rosemar Coelho Neto; Kátia Regina Santos; Thatiana Regina Ignâcio	44.32	Colombia; Norma González; Digna Luz Murillo; Princesa Oliveros; Felipa Palacios	45.43	Venezuela; Jennifer Arveláez; Sandrine Legenort; Yusmely García; Wilmary Álvarez	47.22
4 × 400 metres relay	Brazil; Maria Laura Almirão; Maria Figueirêdo; Lucimar Teodoro; Luciana Mendes	3:32.43 CR	Colombia; Felipa Palacios; Norma González; Rosibel García; Princesa Oliveros	3:40.27	Venezuela; Wilmary Álvarez; Eliana Pacheco; Yusmely García; Jenny Mejías	3:44.74
20,000 metres track walk	Geovana Irusta; Bolivia	1:42:42.33	Gianetti Bonfim; Brazil	1:46:02.08	Cristina Bohórquez; Colombia	1:48:18.75
High jump	Luciane Dambacher; Brazil; Thais de Andrade; Brazil	1.83				
Pole vault	Alejandra García; Argentina	4.00	Alina Alló; Argentina	3.90	María Paz Ausín; Chile; Karen da Silva; Brazil	3.70
Long jump	Maurren Maggi; Brazil	6.69	Luciana dos Santos; Brazil	6.10	Helena Guerrero; Colombia	6.04
Triple jump	Keila Costa; Brazil	13.61	Luciana dos Santos; Brazil	13.48	Mónica Falcioni; Uruguay	13.43
Shot put	Elisângela Adriano; Brazil	17.93	Andréa Pereira; Brazil	15.64	Marianne Berndt; Chile	15.38
Discus throw	Elisângela Adriano; Brazil	58.40	Katiuscia de Jesus; Brazil	49.52	María Eugenia Giggi; Argentina	48.30
Hammer throw	Karina Moya; Argentina	60.83 CR	Josiane Soares; Brazil	58.81	Erika Melián; Argentina	55.70
Javelin throw	Carla Bispo; Brazil	51.98	Alessandra Resende; Brazil	50.83	Romina Maggi; Argentina	48.90
Heptathlon	Elizete da Silva; Brazil	5338	Valeria Steffens; Chile	5157	Mônica Marques; Brazil	5125
WR world record | AR area record | CR championship record | GR games record | NR national record | OR Olympic record | PB personal best | SB season best | WL world leading (in a given season)

== Medal table ==
Rank	Nation	Gold	Silver	Bronze	Total
1	Brazil (BRA)	34	22	14	70
2	Argentina (ARG)	5	4	8	17
3	Venezuela (VEN)	1	5	8	14
4	Colombia (COL)	1	4	4	9
5	Chile (CHI)	1	3	3	7
6	Uruguay (URU)	1	1	3	5
7	Bolivia (BOL)	1	1	0	2
7	Suriname (SUR)	1	1	0	2
9	Peru (PER)	0	1	1	2
10	Paraguay (PAR)	0	1	0	1
11	Ecuador (ECU)	0	0	3	3
Totals (11 entries)		45	43	44	132

== Participation ==
- Argentina (34)
- Bolivia (5)
- Brazil (77)
- Chile (23)
- Colombia (10)
- Ecuador (16)
- French Guiana (1) (guest)
- Guyana (3)
- Panama (1)
- Paraguay (1)
- Peru (7)
- Suriname (2)
- Uruguay (9)
- Venezuela (28)

== See also ==
- 2001 in athletics (track and field)
