= Athletics at the 2005 Bolivarian Games – Results =

These are the results of the athletics competition at the 2005 Bolivarian Games which took place between August 18 and August 21, 2005, in Armenia, Colombia. The results were assembled from various sources.

== Men's results ==
=== 100 meters ===
Final – 19 August – Wind: -0.4 m/s

Rank	Name	Nationality	Time	Notes
1st place, gold medalist(s)	Daniel Grueso	Colombia	10.44	
2nd place, silver medalist(s)	Harlin Echavarría	Colombia	10.66	
3rd place, bronze medalist(s)	Luis Morán	Ecuador	10.69	
4	Eduar Mena	Colombia	10.72	
5	Jonathan Medina	Venezuela	10.77	
6	Juan Morillo	Venezuela	10.81	
7	Helly Ollarves	Venezuela	10.82	
8	Andrés Gallegos	Ecuador	10.97	

=== 200 meters ===
Final – 20 August – Wind: +0.4 m/s

Rank	Name	Nationality	Time	Notes
1st place, gold medalist(s)	Daniel Grueso	Colombia	20.75	NR
2nd place, silver medalist(s)	Hawar Murillo	Colombia	21.24	
3rd place, bronze medalist(s)	Helly Ollarves	Venezuela	21.35	
4	José Carabalí	Venezuela	21.60	
5	Luis Morán	Ecuador	21.61	
6	Marcos Rivadeneira	Ecuador	22.23	
	Andrés Gallegos	Ecuador	DNS	

=== 400 meters ===
Final – 19 August

Rank	Name	Nationality	Time	Notes
1st place, gold medalist(s)	Carlos Peña	Colombia	46.65	
2nd place, silver medalist(s)	Carlos Pérez	Venezuela	46.72	PB
3rd place, bronze medalist(s)	Javier Mosquera	Colombia	47.17	
4	William Hernández	Venezuela	47.54	
5	José Faneite	Venezuela	48.31	
6	Marcos Rivadeneira	Ecuador	48.61	
7	Cristián Matute	Ecuador	48.88	
8	Francisco Aguirre	Ecuador	49.51	

=== 800 meters ===
Final – 20 August

Rank	Name	Nationality	Time	Notes
1st place, gold medalist(s)	Simoncito Silvera	Venezuela	1:51.26	
2nd place, silver medalist(s)	Jhon Chávez	Colombia	1:51.40	
3rd place, bronze medalist(s)	Ignácio Iglesias	Bolivia	1:51.41	
4	Nico Herrera	Venezuela	1:52.48	
5	Gilder Barboza	Venezuela	1:53.09	
6	Cristián Matute	Ecuador	1:53.84	
7	César Barquero	Peru	1:54.01	
8	Amílcar Torres	Colombia	1:54.23	
	Byron Piedra	Ecuador	DNS	

=== 1500 meters ===
Final – 19 August

Rank	Name	Nationality	Time	Notes
1st place, gold medalist(s)	Byron Piedra	Ecuador	3:44.62	
2nd place, silver medalist(s)	Jhon Chávez	Colombia	3:45.97	PB
3rd place, bronze medalist(s)	Nico Herrera	Venezuela	3:46.16	
4	Eduard Villanueva	Venezuela	3:46.32	
	Cristián Patiño	Ecuador	DNS	

=== 5000 meters ===
Final – 18 August

Rank	Name	Nationality	Time	Notes
1st place, gold medalist(s)	José Alirio Carrasco	Colombia	14:23.61	PB
2nd place, silver medalist(s)	John Cusi	Peru	14:23.76	
3rd place, bronze medalist(s)	Jacinto López	Colombia	14:41.40	
4	Lervis Arias	Venezuela	14:48.23	
5	Franklin Tenorio	Ecuador	14:49.46	
6	Edgar Chancusia	Ecuador	14:50.37	
7	Byron Piedra	Ecuador	15:13.05	
	Rolando Ortiz	Colombia	DNF	
	Manuel Bellorín	Venezuela	DNF	

=== 10,000 meters ===
Final – 21 August

Rank	Name	Nationality	Time	Notes
1st place, gold medalist(s)	José Alirio Carrasco	Colombia	30:06.24	
2nd place, silver medalist(s)	Lervis Arias	Venezuela	30:19.78	
3rd place, bronze medalist(s)	Jacinto López	Colombia	30:45.45	
4	John Cusi	Peru	30:47.00	
5	Rolando Ortiz	Colombia	31:14.48	
6	Edgar Chancusia	Ecuador	31:53.75	

=== Half marathon ===
Final – 21 August

Rank	Name	Nationality	Time	Notes
1st place, gold medalist(s)	Diego Colorado	Colombia	1:07:18	
2nd place, silver medalist(s)	Silvio Guerra	Ecuador	1:07:31	
3rd place, bronze medalist(s)	Franklin Tenorio	Ecuador	1:07:39	
4	Edgar Sánchez	Colombia	1:10:12	
5	Jorge Real	Colombia	1:11:41	
6	Pedro Mora	Venezuela	1:12:34	
7	Robert Lugo	Venezuela	1:12:35	
	Miguel Canaza	Peru	DNF	

=== 3000 meters steeplechase ===
Final – 20 August

Rank	Name	Nationality	Time	Notes
1st place, gold medalist(s)	Emigdio Delgado	Venezuela	9:05.93	
2nd place, silver medalist(s)	Néstor Nieves	Venezuela	9:07.13	
3rd place, bronze medalist(s)	Richard Arias	Ecuador	9:09.72	
4	Miguel Canaza	Peru	9:14.44	
5	Diego Moreno	Peru	9:16.94	
6	Julio Pulido	Colombia	9:18.02	
7	Cristián Patiño	Ecuador	9:44.37	

=== 110 meters hurdles ===
Final – 19 August – Wind: -0.1 m/s

Rank	Name	Nationality	Time	Notes
1st place, gold medalist(s)	Paulo Villar	Colombia	13.44	GR, NR
2nd place, silver medalist(s)	Jackson Quiñónez	Ecuador	13.53	
3rd place, bronze medalist(s)	Jhonatan Davis	Venezuela	14.63	
4	Óscar Candanoza	Colombia	15.27	

=== 400 meters hurdles ===
Final – 20 August

Rank	Name	Nationality	Time	Notes
1st place, gold medalist(s)	Paulo Villar	Colombia	50.61	
2nd place, silver medalist(s)	Víctor Solarte	Venezuela	51.51	
3rd place, bronze medalist(s)	Ángel Rodríguez	Venezuela	51.70	PB
4	Óscar Candanoza	Colombia	51.77	
5	Miguel Calvo	Venezuela	53.46	
6	Esteban Lucero	Ecuador	54.63	
7	Jhon López	Colombia	55.02	

=== High jump ===
Final – 20 August

Rank	Name	Nationality	2.15	2.18	2.23	2.26	2.29	Result	Notes
1st place, gold medalist(s)	Gilmar Mayo	Colombia	O	O	XO	O	XXX	2.26	GR
2nd place, silver medalist(s)	Beltrán León	Venezuela						2.15	
3rd place, bronze medalist(s)	Daniel Rodríguez	Venezuela						2.12	
4	Wanner Miller	Colombia						2.09	
	Cristián Calle	Ecuador						NH	

=== Pole vault ===
Final – 20 August

Rank	Name	Nationality	4.30	4.50	4.60	4.70	4.80	Result	Notes
1st place, gold medalist(s)	César González	Venezuela	O	XO	O	XO	XXX	4.70	
2nd place, silver medalist(s)	David Rojas	Colombia	XO	XXO	O	XO	XXX	4.70	
3rd place, bronze medalist(s)	Víctor Medina	Colombia	O	O	XXX			4.50	
	Óscar Mina	Ecuador						NH	
	Francisco León	Peru						DNS	

=== Long jump ===
Final – 18 August

Rank	Name	Nationality	#1	#2	#3	#4	#5	#6	Result	Notes
1st place, gold medalist(s)	Esteban Copland	Venezuela	7.42 (+0.1 m/s)	7.71 (+0.7 m/s)	-	x	7.75 (+1.3 m/s)	7.67 (+0.8 m/s)	7.75 (+1.3 m/s)	
2nd place, silver medalist(s)	Luis Tristán	Peru							7.74 (+1.5 m/s)	
3rd place, bronze medalist(s)	Marco Ibargüen	Colombia	7.25 (+0.1 m/s)	x	7.57 (+1.3 m/s)	1.64 (+0.9 m/s)	x	x	7.64 (+0.9 m/s)	
4	Carlos Jaramillo	Ecuador							7.62 (+1.7 m/s)	
5	Hugo Chila	Ecuador							7.61 (+1.7 m/s)	NJR
6	Dainler Griego	Colombia	6.84 (+0.5 m/s)	7.19 (+0.8 m/s)	7.26 (+1.2 m/s)	7.00 (0.0 m/s)	6.97 (+1.4 m/s)	7.26 (+1.2 m/s)	7.26 (+1.2 m/s)	
7	Jhonatan Davis	Venezuela	7.03 (+0.3 m/s)	x	x	6.87 (0.0 m/s)	7.16 (+0.8 m/s)	x	7.16 (+0.8 m/s)	

=== Triple jump ===
Final – 19 August

Rank	Name	Nationality	#1	#2	#3	#4	#5	#6	Result	Notes
1st place, gold medalist(s)	Jhonny Rodríguez	Venezuela	x	15.87 (-0.7 m/s)	16.10 (-3.4 m/s)	x	15.85 (-2.3 m/s)	x	16.10 (-3.4 m/s)	
2nd place, silver medalist(s)	Hugo Chila	Ecuador							15.92 (-2.1 m/s)	
3rd place, bronze medalist(s)	Carlos Carabalí	Colombia	14.40 (+0.4 m/s)	15.71 (-2.7 m/s)	14.91 (-1.9 m/s)	14.99 (-2.5 m/s)	15.36 (-1.3 m/s)	15.83 (-1.7 m/s)	15.83 (-1.7 m/s)	
4	Freddy Nieves	Ecuador							15.31 (-0.1 m/s)	
5	Carlos Jaramillo	Ecuador							15.09 (-0.6 m/s)	

=== Shot put ===
Rank	Name	Nationality	#1	#2	#3	#4	#5	#6	Result	Notes
1st place, gold medalist(s)	Yojer Medina	Venezuela	x	18.74	18.16	x	18.22	18.11	18.74	
2nd place, silver medalist(s)	Carlos García	Colombia	18.33	17.85	18.36	18.50	18.10	18.09	18.50	PB
3rd place, bronze medalist(s)	Edmundo Martínez	Venezuela	x	17.89	17.31	17.73	18.14	17.17	18.14	PB
4	Jesús Parejo	Venezuela	15.68	x	16.20	16.37	16.57	15.89	16.57	
	Gabriel Hugo	Ecuador							NM	
	Jhonny Rodríguez	Colombia							DNS	

=== Discus throw ===
Rank	Name	Nationality	#1	#2	#3	#4	#5	#6	Result	Notes
1st place, gold medalist(s)	Jesús Parejo	Venezuela	x	52.99	54.65	52.96	x	x	54.65	
2nd place, silver medalist(s)	Héctor Hurtado	Venezuela	48.69	50.46	x	50.50	51.04	52.15	52.15	
-^{*}	Yojer Medina	Venezuela	50.33	47.75	49.56	x	x	50.76	50.76	
3rd place, bronze medalist(s)	Gabriel Hugo	Ecuador							45.37	
	Jhonny Rodríguez	Colombia							DNS	

^{*}:only two medals per event per country

=== Hammer throw ===
Rank	Name	Nationality	#1	#2	#3	#4	#5	#6	Result	Notes
1st place, gold medalist(s)	Aldo Bello	Venezuela	65.81	67.63	-	x	-	-	67.63	GR, NR
2nd place, silver medalist(s)	Eduardo Acuña	Peru							66.39	
3rd place, bronze medalist(s)	Jesús Parejo	Venezuela	58.50	59.14	58.95	x	-	59.32	59.32	
4	Freiman Arias	Colombia	56.64	56.85	56.33	x	57.28	55.42	57.28	

=== Javelin throw ===
Rank	Name	Nationality	#1	#2	#3	#4	#5	#6	Result	Notes
1st place, gold medalist(s)	Noraldo Palacios	Colombia	70.10	x	70.26	70.69	77.37	73.90	77.37	
2nd place, silver medalist(s)	Manuel Fuenmayor	Venezuela	71.99	62.85	72.93	x	x	70.64	72.93	
3rd place, bronze medalist(s)	Jhonny Viáfara	Colombia	62.82	67.94	70.98	65.34	69.77	65.42	70.98	
4	Ronald Noguera	Venezuela	x	x	67.59	x	69.72	69.96	69.96	
	Óscar Mina	Ecuador							DNS	

=== Decathlon ===
Final – 20 August

The highest mark recorded in each event is highlighted in yellow

Rank	Name	Nationality	100m	LJ	SP	HJ	400m	110m H	DT	PV	JT	1500m	Points	Notes
1st place, gold medalist(s)	Andrés Mantilla	Colombia	11.06 (+1.5)	6.71 (+1.9)	13.68	2.04	51.10	14.79 (+1.5)	42.75	4.20	49.82	4:54.82	7352	
2nd place, silver medalist(s)	Juan Jaramillo	Venezuela	11.48 (+1.5)	7.03 (+1.2)	12.42	1.95	51.48	14.82 (+1.5)	39.10	4.10	59.99	4:51.15	7228	PB
3rd place, bronze medalist(s)	Óscar Mina	Ecuador	10.67 (+1.5)	6.75 (-0.5)	12.29	1.95	50.76	16.98 (+1.5)	36.03	3.70	43.49	DNF	6090	

=== 20 kilometers walk ===
Final – 19 August

Rank	Name	Nationality	Time	Notes
1st place, gold medalist(s)	Rolando Saquipay	Ecuador	1:22:51	GR
2nd place, silver medalist(s)	Jefferson Pérez	Ecuador	1:24:22	
3rd place, bronze medalist(s)	Gustavo Restrepo	Colombia	1:24:54	
4	Luis Fernando López	Colombia	1:25:01	
5	Jhon García	Colombia	1:28:00	
6	Dionisio Neira	Peru	1:29:33	
7	Juan Sandy	Bolivia	1:31:09	
8	Ronald Huayta	Bolivia	1:34:12	
9	Jesús Chirinos	Venezuela	1:39:35	
	Edwin Centeno	Peru	DNF	

=== 50 kilometers walk ===
Final – 21 August

Rank	Name	Nationality	Time	Notes
1st place, gold medalist(s)	Xavier Moreno	Ecuador	4:09:07	
2nd place, silver medalist(s)	Fausto Quinde	Ecuador	4:10:37	
3rd place, bronze medalist(s)	Edwin Centeno	Peru	4:13:50	NR
4	Dionisio Neira	Peru	4:20:41	PB
5	Joaquín Córdoba	Colombia	4:21:15	PB
6	Franklin Aduviri	Bolivia	4:26:50	PB
	Rodrigo Moreno	Colombia	DQ	
	Jesús Chirinos	Venezuela	DNS	
	Ronald Huayta	Bolivia	DNS	

=== 4 x 100 meters relay ===
Final – 20 August

Rank	Nation	Competitors	Time	Notes
1st place, gold medalist(s)	Colombia	Harlin Echavarría; Eduar Mena; Hawar Murillo; Daniel Grueso	39.80	
2nd place, silver medalist(s)	Venezuela	Juan Morillo; Jhonatan Medina; José Carabalí; Helly Ollarves	39.97	
	Ecuador		DQ	

=== 4 x 400 meters relay ===
Final – 21 August

Rank	Nation	Competitors	Time	Notes
1st place, gold medalist(s)	Colombia	Amílcar Torres; Javier Mosquera; Jhon López; Carlos Peña	3:07.99	
2nd place, silver medalist(s)	Venezuela	William Hernández; Simoncito Silvera; Carlos Pérez; Josner Rodríguez	3:08.16	
3rd place, bronze medalist(s)	Ecuador	Francisco Aguirre; Cristián Matute; Luis Morán; Marcos Rivadeneira	3:18.71	

== Women's results ==
=== 100 meters ===
Heat 1 – 19 August – Wind: -0.5 m/s

Rank	Name	Nationality	Time	Notes
1	Yomara Hinestroza	Colombia	11.68	Q
2	Ana Caicedo	Ecuador	11.85	Q
3	Yaudelis Barboza	Venezuela	12.07	Q
4	Jackeline Carabalí	Venezuela	12.11	q
5	Paola Sánchez	Ecuador	12.50	

Heat 2 – 19 August – Wind: +1.4 m/s

Rank	Name	Nationality	Time	Notes
1	Melisa Murillo	Colombia	11.35	Q
2	Felipa Palacios	Colombia	11.70	Q
3	Fiorela Molina	Venezuela	11.85	Q
4	Jéssica Perea	Ecuador	12.18	q
5	Maitté Zamorano	Bolivia	12.27	

Final – 19 August – Wind: +1.6 m/s

Rank	Name	Nationality	Time	Notes
1st place, gold medalist(s)	Felipa Palacios	Colombia	11.18	NR
2nd place, silver medalist(s)	Melisa Murillo	Colombia	11.22	PB
-^{*}	Yomara Hinestroza	Colombia	11.56	
3rd place, bronze medalist(s)	Ana Caicedo	Ecuador	11.69	
4	Fiorela Molina	Venezuela	11.82	
5	Yaudelis Barboza	Venezuela	11.90	
6	Jéssica Perea	Ecuador	12.14	
7	Jackeline Carabalí	Venezuela	12.24	

^{*}:only two medals per event per country

=== 200 meters ===
Final – 20 August – Wind: +0.7 m/s

Rank	Name	Nationality	Time	Notes
1st place, gold medalist(s)	Felipa Palacios	Colombia	22.85	GR, NR
2nd place, silver medalist(s)	Norma González	Colombia	22.90	PB
-^{*}	Darlenys Obregón	Colombia	23.10	AU20R
3rd place, bronze medalist(s)	Fiorela Molina	Venezuela	24.20	
4	Jéssica Perea	Ecuador	24.50	
5	Leydis Molero	Venezuela	24.73	PB
6	Paola Sánchez	Ecuador	24.93	
	Wilmary Álvarez	Venezuela	DNS	

^{*}:only two medals per event per country

=== 400 meters ===
Final – 19 August

Rank	Name	Nationality	Time	Notes
1st place, gold medalist(s)	Norma González	Colombia	53.08	
2nd place, silver medalist(s)	Lucy Jaramillo	Ecuador	53.76	
3rd place, bronze medalist(s)	María Alejandra Idrovo	Colombia	54.06	
4	Pamela Freire	Ecuador	56.47	
5	Karina Caicedo	Ecuador	56.78	
	Ángela Alfonso	Venezuela	DQ	
	Wilmary Álvarez	Venezuela	DNS	

=== 800 meters ===
Final – 20 August

Rank	Name	Nationality	Time	Notes
1st place, gold medalist(s)	Rosibel García	Colombia	2:01.57	GR, NR
2nd place, silver medalist(s)	Yenny Mejías	Venezuela	2:07.80	
3rd place, bronze medalist(s)	Muriel Coneo	Colombia	2:11.14	
4	Diana Armas	Ecuador	2:13.80	
5	Lucy Jaramillo	Ecuador	2:27.73	
	Niusha Mancilla	Bolivia	DNS	

=== 1500 meters ===
Final – 19 August

Rank	Name	Nationality	Time	Notes
1st place, gold medalist(s)	Rosibel García	Colombia	4:29.16	
2nd place, silver medalist(s)	Mónica Amboya	Ecuador	4:36.11	
3rd place, bronze medalist(s)	Ángela Figueroa	Colombia	4:38.42	
4	Yeisy Álvarez	Venezuela	4:53.70	
	Niusha Mancilla	Bolivia	DNS	

=== 5000 meters ===
Final – 21 August

Rank	Name	Nationality	Time	Notes
1st place, gold medalist(s)	Bertha Sánchez	Colombia	17:40.58	
2nd place, silver medalist(s)	María Elena Calle	Ecuador	17:46.39	
3rd place, bronze medalist(s)	Rosa Chacha	Ecuador	17:48.63	
4	Raquel Aceituno	Peru	17:50.82	
5	Mónica Amboya	Ecuador	17:56.72	
6	Yolanda Caballero	Colombia	17:56.88	
7	Yeisy Álvarez	Venezuela	18:21.82	
	Niusha Mancilla	Bolivia	DNS	
	Valentina Medina	Venezuela	DNS	

=== 10,000 meters ===
Final – 18 August

Rank	Name	Nationality	Time	Notes
1st place, gold medalist(s)	Martha Tenorio	Ecuador	34:36.66	
2nd place, silver medalist(s)	Bertha Sánchez	Colombia	35:25.39	
3rd place, bronze medalist(s)	Raquel Aceituno	Peru	35:29.16	PB
4	Iglandini González	Colombia	37:05.00	
	Ruby Riativa	Colombia	DNS	

=== Half marathon ===
Final – 21 August

Rank	Name	Nationality	Time	Notes
1st place, gold medalist(s)	Sandra Ruales	Ecuador	1:20:12	
2nd place, silver medalist(s)	Norelis Lugo	Venezuela	1:22:11	
3rd place, bronze medalist(s)	Iglandini González	Colombia	1:22:51	
4	Luz Maldonado	Venezuela	1:25:25	
5	Yalimar Pineda	Venezuela	1:26:20	
6	Ruby Riativa	Colombia	1:26:20	
7	Claudia Tangarife	Colombia	1:29:19	
	Raquel Aceituno	Peru	DNF	
	Martha Tenorio	Ecuador	DNF	
	Gabriela Ceballos	Ecuador	DNF	

=== 3000 meters steeplechase ===
Final – 20 August

Rank	Name	Nationality	Time	Notes
1st place, gold medalist(s)	Mónica Amboya	Ecuador	10:35.65	
2nd place, silver medalist(s)	Ángela Figueroa	Colombia	10:41.93	
3rd place, bronze medalist(s)	Yolanda Caballero	Colombia	10:51.85	
	Niusha Mancilla	Bolivia	DNS	

=== 100 meters hurdles ===
Final – 19 August – Wind: -1.2 m/s

Rank	Name	Nationality	Time	Notes
1st place, gold medalist(s)	Brigith Merlano	Colombia	13.62	
2nd place, silver medalist(s)	Princesa Oliveros	Colombia	13.71	
3rd place, bronze medalist(s)	Sandrine Legenort	Venezuela	14.07	
4	Patrícia Riesco	Peru	14.21	
5	Paola Sánchez	Ecuador	15.24	

=== 400 meters hurdles ===
Final – 20 August

Rank	Name	Nationality	Time	Notes
1st place, gold medalist(s)	Lucy Jaramillo	Ecuador	57.58	
2nd place, silver medalist(s)	Princesa Oliveros	Colombia	58.35	
3rd place, bronze medalist(s)	Yusmelis García	Venezuela	1:00.19	
4	Helen Delgado	Venezuela	1:01.29	
5	Karina Caicedo	Ecuador	1:03.10	
6	Brigith Merlano	Colombia	1:08.31	

=== High jump ===
Final – 18 August

Rank	Name	Nationality	1.60	1.65	1.68	1.71	1.74	1.77	1.80	1.83	1.88	1.91	1.94	Result	Notes
1st place, gold medalist(s)	Caterine Ibargüen	Colombia	-	-	-	O	-	O	O	O	O	O	X-	1.91	GR
2nd place, silver medalist(s)	Marierlis Rojas	Venezuela	-	-	O	O	O	XXO	O	XXX				1.80	NU20R
3rd place, bronze medalist(s)	Tatiana Rodríguez	Colombia	O	O	XXX									1.65	
	Virna Salazar	Ecuador												NM	
	Lorena Ortiz	Ecuador												NM	

=== Pole vault ===
Final – 19 August

Rank	Name	Nationality	3.20	3.30	3.40	3.50	3.60	3.70	3.80	3.90	4.00	4.10	4.21	4.35	Result	Notes
1st place, gold medalist(s)	Milena Agudelo	Colombia	-	-	-	-	-	O	O	XO	O	XO	O	XXX	4.21	GR, NR
2nd place, silver medalist(s)	Karina Quejada	Colombia	O	O	XO	XO	XXX								3.50	
3rd place, bronze medalist(s)	María Isabel Ferrand	Peru													3.40	
4	Lorena Ortiz	Ecuador													3.00	
	Keisa Monterola	Venezuela	-	-	-	-	-	-	X-	X-	X				NH	

=== Long jump ===
Final – 20 August

Rank	Name	Nationality	#1	#2	#3	#4	#5	#6	Result	Notes
1st place, gold medalist(s)	Caterine Ibargüen	Colombia	x	x	6.54 (+0.7 m/s)	-	-	-	6.54 (+0.7 m/s)	NR
2nd place, silver medalist(s)	Helena Guerrero	Colombia							6.05 (-1.6 m/s)	
-^{*}	Johanna Triviño	Colombia							6.04 (+0.7 m/s)	
3rd place, bronze medalist(s)	Ana Caicedo	Ecuador							5.98 (+1.2 m/s)	
4	Jennifer Arveláez	Venezuela							5.98 (+2.0 m/s)	
5	Jéssica Morillo	Venezuela							5.81 (+1.9 m/s)	
6	Daisy Ugarte	Bolivia							5.74 (+1.7 m/s)	
7	Paola Sánchez	Ecuador							5.74 (+0.5 m/s)	
	Ludmila Reyes	Venezuela							DNS	

^{*}:only two medals per event per country

=== Triple jump ===
Final – 21 August

Rank	Name	Nationality	#1	#2	#3	#4	#5	#6	Result	Notes
1st place, gold medalist(s)	Johanna Triviño	Colombia	13.61 (+0.6 m/s)	13.90 (+2.0 m/s)	x	13.26 (+0.4 m/s)	x	13.42 (+0.1 m/s)	13.90 (+2.0 m/s)	NR
2nd place, silver medalist(s)	Caterine Ibargüen	Colombia	13.61 (+1.8 m/s)	13.64 (+1.9 m/s)	-	-	-	-	13.64 (+1.9 m/s)	
3rd place, bronze medalist(s)	Jennifer Arveláez	Venezuela	13.25 (+0.7 m/s)	x	13.12 (-0.7 m/s)	x	13.43 (+0.3 m/s)	13.52 (-0.6 m/s)	13.52 (-0.6 m/s)	
4	Verónica Davis	Venezuela	12.89 (+0.7 m/s)	13.23 (+1.8 m/s)	13.18 (+1.7 m/s)	12.46 (-0.7 m/s)	12.85 (-0.4 m/s)	13.16 (-0.1 m/s)	13.23 (+1.8 m/s)	
5	Ludmila Reyes	Venezuela	12.36 (+1.0 m/s)	x	12.86 (+0.6 m/s)	-	-	x	12.86 (+0.6 m/s)	
6	Daisy Ugarte	Bolivia							12.61 (+1.4 m/s)	
7	Maitté Zamorano	Bolivia							12.04 (+0.9 m/s)	

=== Shot put ===
Rank	Name	Nationality	Result	Notes
1st place, gold medalist(s)	Luz Dary Castro	Colombia	16.46	
2nd place, silver medalist(s)	Ahymara Espinoza	Venezuela	15.17	
3rd place, bronze medalist(s)	Eli Johana Moreno	Colombia	13.99	
4	Karina Díaz	Ecuador	12.95	
DQ	Rosario Ramos	Venezuela	14.71	Doping

=== Discus throw ===
Rank	Name	Nationality	#1	#2	#3	#4	#5	#6	Result	Notes
1st place, gold medalist(s)	Luz Dary Castro	Colombia	x	51.07	53.34	51.72	x	x	53.34	
2nd place, silver medalist(s)	María Cubillán	Venezuela	48.94	43.32	47.68	x	47.42	48.74	48.94	
3rd place, bronze medalist(s)	Karina Díaz	Ecuador							45.42	
DQ	Rosario Ramos	Venezuela	52.20	53.60	x	50.77	50.00	50.06	53.60	Doping

=== Hammer throw ===
Rank	Name	Nationality	#1	#2	#3	#4	#5	#6	Result	Notes
1st place, gold medalist(s)	Johana Ramírez	Colombia	61.91	60.47	60.62	59.12	60.48	50.57	61.91	NR
2nd place, silver medalist(s)	Rosa Rodríguez	Venezuela	61.73	x	59.53	60.74	x	x	61.63	ARj
3rd place, bronze medalist(s)	Eli Johana Moreno	Colombia	x	x	59.99	57.76	x	x	59.99	
4	Adriana Benaventa	Venezuela	x	x	x	x	50.84	x	50.84	
5	Karina Díaz	Ecuador							42.83	

=== Javelin throw ===
Rank	Name	Nationality	Result	Notes
1st place, gold medalist(s)	Zuleima Araméndiz	Colombia	54.78	
2nd place, silver medalist(s)	María González	Venezuela	50.58	
3rd place, bronze medalist(s)	Jeny Llulluna	Ecuador	46.74	

=== Heptathlon ===
Final – 20 August

The highest mark recorded in each event is highlighted in yellow

Rank	Name	Nationality	100m H	HJ	SP	200m	LJ	JT	800m	Points	Notes
1st place, gold medalist(s)	Thaimara Rivas	Venezuela	14.64 (+0.7)	1.70	12.42	25.90 (+0.4)	5.80 (-0.6)	41.39	2:26.44	5461	
2nd place, silver medalist(s)	Nasli Perea	Colombia	14.61 (+0.7)	1.70	11.52	26.03 (+0.4)	5.50 (+0.6)	39.48	2:31.99	5198	
3rd place, bronze medalist(s)	Diana Ibargüen	Colombia	14.29 (+0.7)	1.61	11.67	25.94 (+0.4)	5.61 (+0.2)	36.49	2:31.33	5134	
4	Madeleine Rondón	Venezuela	14.59 (+0.7)	1.61	8.77	25.56 (+0.4)	5.29 (-0.8)	31.55	2:21.10	4884	
5	Virna Salazar	Ecuador	15.00 (+0.7)	1.55	9.49	26.52 (+0.4)	5.36 (-0.2)	35.61	2:22.30	4804	

=== 20 kilometers walk ===
Final – 21 August

Rank	Name	Nationality	Time	Notes
1st place, gold medalist(s)	Geovana Irusta	Bolivia	1:39:14	
2nd place, silver medalist(s)	Sandra Zapata	Colombia	1:41:07	
3rd place, bronze medalist(s)	Mabel Oncebay	Peru	1:43:26	
4	Nydia Moreno	Colombia	1:45:33	
5	Carolina Flores	Venezuela	1:48:38	
6	Janeth Mamaní	Bolivia	1:49:17	
7	Tatiana Orellana	Ecuador	1:50:43	
8	Eunice Chávez	Bolivia	1:56:54	

=== 4 x 100 meters relay ===
Final – 20 August

Rank	Nation	Competitors	Time	Notes
1st place, gold medalist(s)	Colombia	Norma González; Melisa Murillo; Felipa Palacios; Darlenys Obregón	45.61	
2nd place, silver medalist(s)	Venezuela	Yaudelis Barboza; Jackeline Carabalí; Fiorela Molina; Leydis Molero	46.08	
3rd place, bronze medalist(s)	Ecuador	Ana Caicedo; Jéssica Perea; Jazmín Caicedo; Paola Sánchez	46.69	

=== 4 x 400 meters relay ===
Final – 21 August

Rank	Nation	Competitors	Time	Notes
1st place, gold medalist(s)	Colombia	Rosibell García; María Alejandra Idrovo; Felipa Palacios; Norma González	3:35.25	
2nd place, silver medalist(s)	Venezuela	Fiorela Molina; Helen Delgado; Yenny Mejías; Yusmelis García	3:41.13	
3rd place, bronze medalist(s)	Ecuador	Karina Caicedo; Pamela Freile; Lucy Jaramillo; Érika Chávez	3:45.12	
