= Carolina Torres =

Chilean pole vaulter (born 1979)

Personal information
- Born: March 16, 1979 (age 47) Temuco, Chile

Sport
- Sport: Track and field
Medal record
Representing Chile
Pan American Games
Silver medal – second place	2003 Santo Domingo	Pole vault

Carolina Alejandra Torres Guzmán (born March 16, 1979) is a Chilean pole vaulter and former heptathlete.

She won the silver medal at the 2003 Pan American Games in Santo Domingo, vaulting her personal best of 4.30 metres. She also competed at the 2004 Summer Olympics in Athens, Greece.

== Competition record ==
Year	Competition	Venue	Position	Event	Notes
Representing Chile
1996	South American Junior Championships	Bucaramanga, Colombia	3rd	Heptathlon	4277 pts
2001	South American Championships	Manaus, Brazil	5th	100 m hurdles	14.21 s
2001	South American Championships	Manaus, Brazil	4th	4 × 100 m relay	48.81
2001	South American Championships	Manaus, Brazil	5th	Pole vault	3.70 m
2003	South American Championships	Barquisimeto, Venezuela	2nd	Pole vault	4.20 m
2003	Pan American Games	Santo Domingo, Dominican Republic	2nd	Pole vault	4.30 m
2003	World Championships	Paris, France	–	Pole vault	NM
2004	Ibero-American Championships	Huelva, Spain	9th	Pole vault	3.90 m
2004	Olympic Games	Athens, Greece	33rd (q)	Pole vault	4.00 m
2006	Ibero-American Championships	Ponce, Puerto Rico	4th	Pole vault	4.10 m
2006	South American Championships	Tunja, Colombia	2nd	Pole vault	4.25 m
2007	Pan American Games	Rio de Janeiro, Brazil	6th	Pole vault	4.00 m
2008	Ibero-American Championships	Iquique, Chile	2nd	Pole vault	4.10 m
2009	South American Championships	Lima, Peru	2nd	Pole vault	4.10 m
