= Raphael Oliveira =

Raphael Oliveira may refer to:

- Raphael Vieira de Oliveira (born 1979), Brazilian volleyball player
- Raphael Oliveira (athlete) Brazilian sprinter, competed at the 2000 Summer Olympics
