= 2003 South American Championships in Athletics =

42nd South American Championships
- Dates: 20–22 June 2003
- Host city: Barquisimeto, Venezuela
- Venue: Polideportivo Máximo Viloria
- Events: 44
- Participation: 296 athletes from 12 nations
- Records set: 8 Championships records

The 2003 South American Championships in Athletics were held from June 20 to June 22 at the Polideportivo Máximo Viloria in Barquisimeto, Venezuela. Detailed day-by-day reports can be found on the IAAF website.

== Medal summary ==
=== Men's events ===
Event	Gold		Silver		Bronze	
100 metres	Édson Ribeiro; Brazil	10.30	Heber Viera; Uruguay	10.33	Jarbas Mascarenhas; Brazil	10.36
200 metres	Heber Viera; Uruguay	20.60	Claudinei da Silva; Brazil	20.63	Jorge Sena; Brazil	20.71
400 metres	William José Hernández; Venezuela	45.81	Anderson Jorge dos Santos; Brazil	46.07	Mauricio Mery; Chile	46.20
800 metres	Fabiano Peçanha; Brazil	1:46.32	Osmar dos Santos; Brazil	1:46.92	Simoncito Silvera; Venezuela	1:48.31
1500 metres	Fabiano Peçanha; Brazil	3:39.74	Miguel Ángel García; Venezuela	3:41.01	Javier Carriqueo; Argentina	3:42.65
5000 metres	Marílson dos Santos; Brazil	13:52.15	William Naranjo; Colombia	14:03.41	Luis Fonseca; Venezuela	14:17.44
10000 metres	William Naranjo; Colombia	29:37.38	Luiz Almeida; Brazil	29:49.11	José Alejandro Semprún; Venezuela	30:06.03
3000 metres steeplechase	Néstor Nieves; Venezuela	8:46.41	Celso Ficagna; Brazil	8:51.73	Richard Arias; Ecuador	8:52.66
110 metres hurdles	Redelen dos Santos; Brazil	13.45 CR	Jackson Quinónez; Ecuador	13.59	Mateus Inocencio; Brazil	13.69
400 metres hurdles	Bayano Kamani; Panama	50.10	Cleverson da Silva; Brazil	50.35	Eronilde de Araújo; Brazil	50.81
4 × 100 metres relay	Brazil; Jarbas Mascarenhas; Édson Ribeiro; Cláudio Roberto Souza; Claudinei da Silva	38.96	Venezuela; Juan Morillo; Omar José Cortés; José Carabalí; Hely Ollarves	39.85	Chile; Pablo Colville; Ricardo Roach; Guillermo Mayer; Mauricio Mery	40.04
4 × 400 metres relay	Brazil; Luís Ambrosio; Eronilde de Araújo; Flávio Godoy; Anderson Jorge dos Santos	3:05.28	Venezuela; Jonathan Palma; Luis Luna; Danny Núnez; William José Hernández	3:09.26	Colombia; Jhon Chávez; Gélver Espinoza; Edgar José Bermudes; Julio César Rojas	3:09.48
20000 metres track walk	Sérgio Galdino; Brazil	1:25:54.2	Fredy Hernández; Colombia	1:26:00.0	Cristian Muñoz; Chile	1:31:16.1
High jump	Fabrício Romero; Brazil	2.22	Jessé de Lima; Brazil	2.22	Alfredo Deza; Peru	2.16
Pole vault	Ricardo Diez; Venezuela	5.20	Javier Benítez; Argentina	5.20	Gustavo Rehder; Brazil	5.10
Long jump	Víctor Castillo; Venezuela	7.78	Sérgio dos Santos; Brazil	7.65	Irving Saladino; Panama	7.46
Triple jump	Jadel Gregório; Brazil	16.76	Anísio Silva; Brazil	16.22	Johnny Rodríguez; Venezuela	16.12
Shot put	Marco Antonio Verni; Chile	20.23 CR	Yojer Medina; Venezuela	19.29	Jhonny Rodríguez; Colombia	18.22
Discus throw	Marcelo Pugliese; Argentina	57.44	Jorge Balliengo; Argentina	55.22	Héctor Hurtado; Venezuela	54.61
Hammer throw	Juan Cerra; Argentina	73.31	Adrián Marzo; Argentina	67.25	Aldo Bello; Venezuela	65.27
Javelin throw	Luiz Fernando da Silva; Brazil	79.50 CR	Noraldo Palacios; Colombia	76.81	Nery Kennedy; Paraguay	75.53
Decathlon	Édson Bindilatti; Brazil	7254	Juan Jaramillo; Venezuela	6763	Enrique Aguirre; Argentina	6585
WR world record | AR area record | CR championship record | GR games record | NR national record | OR Olympic record | PB personal best | SB season best | WL world leading (in a given season)

=== Women's events ===
Event	Gold		Silver		Bronze	
100 metres	Digna Luz Murillo; Colombia	11.35	Lucimar de Moura; Brazil	11.43	Wilmary Álvarez; Venezuela	11.59
200 metres	Digna Luz Murillo; Colombia	23.13	Lucimar de Moura; Brazil	23.34	Wilmary Álvarez; Venezuela	23.40
400 metres	Geisa Coutinho; Brazil	51.81	Eliana Pacheco; Venezuela	52.43	Josiane Tito; Brazil	52.68
800 metres	Luciana Mendes; Brazil	2:02.06	Christiane dos Santos; Brazil	2:02.50	Rosibel García; Colombia	2:02.84
1500 metres	Juliana de Azevedo; Brazil	4:17.54 CR	Niusha Mancilla; Bolivia	4:21.54	Ana Cláudia Coimbra; Brazil	4:21.75
5000 metres	Maria Rodrigues; Brazil	16:11.70	Erika Olivera; Chile	16:23.97	Lucélia Peres; Brazil	16:36.31
10000 metres	Ednalva da Silva; Brazil	34:13.50	Erika Olivera; Chile	34:43.02	Luz Eliana Silva; Chile	35:01.73
3000 metres steeplechase	Mónica Amboya; Ecuador	10:25.90 CR	Silvia Paredes; Ecuador	10:38.22	Patrícia Lobo; Brazil	10:55.88
100 metres hurdles	Gilvaneide Parrela; Brazil	13.44	Maíla Machado; Brazil	13.63	Princesa Oliveros; Colombia	13.77
400 metres hurdles	Lucimar Teodoro; Brazil	56.86 CR	Raquel da Costa; Brazil	57.51	Princesa Oliveros; Colombia	57.53
4 × 100 metres relay	Brazil; Renata Vilela Sampaio; Lucimar de Moura; Rosemar Coelho Neto; Thatiana Regina Ignâcio	44.16	Colombia; Mirtha Brock; Luz Celia Ararat; Melisa Murillo; Digna Luz Murillo	44.67	Chile; Daniela Riderelli; María José Echeverría; Daniela Pávez; María Izabel Coloma	45.37
4 × 400 metres relay	Brazil; Maria Laura Almirao; Josiane Tito; Lucimar Teodoro; Geisa Coutinho	3:28.64 CR	Venezuela; Wilmary Álvarez; Ángela Alfonso; Yusmelis García; Eliana Pacheco	3:34.30	Colombia; Luz Celia Ararat; Princesa Oliveros; Mirtha Brock; Rosibel García	3:41.05
20000 metres track walk	Sandra Zapata; Colombia	1:40:52.60	Morelba Useche; Venezuela	1:48:24.90	Marcela Pacheco; Chile	1:49:50.10
High jump	Luciane Dambacher; Brazil	1.82	Yetzálida Pérez; Venezuela	1.82	Claudia Casals; Argentina	1.79
Pole vault	Alejandra García; Argentina	4.20	Carolina Torres; Chile	4.20	Milena Agudelo; Colombia	4.00
Long jump	Keila Costa; Brazil	6.30	Catherine Ibargüen; Colombia	6.04	Mónica Falcioni; Uruguay	5.94
Triple jump	Keila Costa; Brazil	13.62	Luciana dos Santos; Brazil	13.42	Catherine Ibargüen; Colombia	13.07
Shot put	Elisângela Adriano; Brazil	18.34	Luz Dary Castro; Colombia	16.59	Marianne Berndt; Chile	16.39
Discus throw	Elisângela Adriano; Brazil	58.37	Luz Dary Castro; Colombia	51.73	María Cubillán; Venezuela	50.47
Hammer throw	Katiuscia de Jesus; Brazil	61.01 CR	Josiane Soares; Brazil	59.65	Adriana Benaventa; Venezuela	58.34
Javelin throw	Sabina Moya; Colombia	58.30	Alessandra Resende; Brazil	57.01	Romina Maggi; Argentina	52.36
Heptathlon	Thaimara Rivas; Venezuela	5622	Elizete da Silva; Brazil	5334	Valeria Steffens; Chile	5169
WR world record | AR area record | CR championship record | GR games record | NR national record | OR Olympic record | PB personal best | SB season best | WL world leading (in a given season)

== Medal table ==
Rank	Nation	Gold	Silver	Bronze	Total
1	Brazil (BRA)	27	18	9	54
2	Venezuela (VEN)	5	9	10	24
3	Colombia (COL)	5	7	8	20
4	Argentina (ARG)	3	3	4	10
5	Chile (CHI)	1	3	8	12
6	Ecuador (ECU)	1	2	1	4
7	Uruguay (URU)	1	1	1	3
8	Panama (PAN)	1	0	1	2
9	Bolivia (BOL)	0	1	0	1
10	Paraguay (PAR)	0	0	1	1
10	Peru (PER)	0	0	1	1
Totals (11 entries)		44	44	44	132

== Participation ==
- Argentina (33)
- Bolivia (3)
- Brazil (75)
- Chile (40)
- Colombia (36)
- Ecuador (20)
- Guyana (4)
- Panama (4)
- Paraguay (2)
- Peru (8)
- Venezuela (62)
- Uruguay (9)

== See also ==
- Men Results – GBR Athletics
- Women Results – GBR Athletics
- Full results
- CAC Results
