= Javier Benítez =

Argentine pole vaulter

Personal information
- Born: 30 June 1976 (age 49)

Sport
- Sport: Track and field

Javier Benítez (born 30 June 1976) is an Argentine former athlete specializing in the pole vault. He won multiple medals on continental level.

His personal best jump is 5.40 metres from 2001. He retired from competition in 2011.

== Competition record ==
Year	Competition	Venue	Position	Notes
Representing Argentina
1999	South American Championships	Bogotá, Colombia	2nd	5.00 m
2000	Ibero-American Championships	Rio de Janeiro, Brazil	–	NM
2001	South American Championships	Manaus, Brazil	1st	5.40 m
2001	Universiade	Beijing, China	–	NM
2002	Ibero-American Championships	Guatemala City, Guatemala	1st	5.25 m
2003	South American Championships	Barquisimeto, Venezuela	2nd	5.20 m
2003	Pan American Games	Santo Domingo, Dominican Republic	4th	5.35 m
2004	Ibero-American Championships	Huelva, Spain	–	NM
2005	South American Championships	Cali, Colombia	2nd	5.20 m
2006	Ibero-American Championships	Ponce, Puerto Rico	4th	5.25 m
2006	South American Championships	Tunja, Colombia	2nd	5.35 m
2007	South American Championships	São Paulo, Brazil	3rd	5.20 m
2007	Pan American Games	Rio de Janeiro, Brazil	–	NM
