= Maria Rodrigues =

Brazilian long-distance runner

Medal record

Women's athletics

Representing Brazil

South American Championships
Gold medal – first place	2001 Manaus	5000 m
Gold medal – first place	2001 Manaus	10,000 m
Gold medal – first place	2003 Barquisimeto	5000 m

Maria Cristina Bernardo Vaqueiro Rodrigues (born 4 June 1971) is a Brazilian former long-distance runner. She won three gold medals at the South American Championships in Athletics, winning a 5000 metres/10,000 metres double in 2001, then retaining her 5000 m title at the 2003 championships.

Rodrigues has twice represented Brazil at the IAAF World Cross Country Championships (1999 and 2000) and participated at the 2006 IAAF World Road Running Championships. She also won international medals at the Ibero-American Championships in Athletics (10,000 m bronze in 2000) and the South American Cross Country Championships (silver in 1999).

She was the Brazilian champion in the 5000 m in 2003.

== International competitions ==
Year	Competition	Venue	Position	Event	Notes
1999	South American Cross Country Championships	Artur Nogueira, Brazil	2nd	Long race	29:51
1999	South American Cross Country Championships	Artur Nogueira, Brazil	1st	Long team	9 pts
1999	South American Cross Country Championships	Artur Nogueira, Brazil	7th	Short race	14:27
1999	South American Cross Country Championships	Artur Nogueira, Brazil	2nd	Short team	17 pts
1999	World Cross Country Championships	Belfast, United Kingdom	79th	Senior race	31:55
1999	World Cross Country Championships	Belfast, United Kingdom	14th	Senior team	309 pts
1999	World Cross Country Championships	Belfast, United Kingdom	43rd	Short race	16:36
1999	World Cross Country Championships	Belfast, United Kingdom	13th	Short team	255 pts
2000	South American Cross Country Championships	Cartagena de Indias, Colombia	5th	Senior race	29:04
2000	South American Cross Country Championships	Cartagena de Indias, Colombia	1st	Senior team	11 pts
2000	World Cross Country Championships	Vilamoura, Portugal	74th	Senior race	29:24
2000	World Cross Country Championships	Vilamoura, Portugal	14th	Senior team	286 pts
2000	Ibero-American Championships	Rio de Janeiro, Brazil	6th	5000 m	16:14.99
2000	Ibero-American Championships	Rio de Janeiro, Brazil	3rd	10,000 m	34:45.99
2001	South American Championships	Manaus, Brazil	1st	5000 m	16:35.1
2001	South American Championships	Manaus, Brazil	1st	10,000 m	35:25.70
2003	South American Championships	Barquisimeto, Venezuela	1st	5000 m	16:11.70
2006	World Road Running Championships	Debrecen, Hungary	45th	Half marathon	1:12:26
2006	World Road Running Championships	Debrecen, Hungary	11th	Team	3:41:09

== National titles ==
- Brazilian Athletics Championships
  - 5000 metres: 2003
