= Norma González =

Colombian sprinter (born 1982)

Personal information
- Full name: Norma González Camilde
- Nationality: Colombia
- Born: 11 August 1982 (age 43) Santander de Quilichao, Cauca, Colombia
- Height: 1.72 m (5 ft 8 in)
- Weight: 58 kg (128 lb)

Sport
- Sport: Athletics
- Events: 200 metres; 400 metres; 4×100 metres; 4×400 metres
- Coached by: Leonardo Prevost
Medal record
Representing Colombia
Women's athletics
World U20 Championships
Bronze medal – third place	2000 Santiago	400 m
World U18 Championships
Bronze medal – third place	1999 Bydgoszcz	400 m
South American U18 Championships
Gold medal – first place	1998 Manaus	200 m
Gold medal – first place	1998 Manaus	400 m
Bronze medal – third place	1998 Manaus	4×100 m relay
Bronze medal – third place	1998 Manaus	4×400 m relay
- Updated on 4 October 2024

Norma González Camilde (born 11 August 1982) is a Colombian sprinter. (Note: "Norma González". London 2012. The London Organising Committee of the Olympic Games and Paralympic Games Limited.)

== Career ==
At the 2012 Summer Olympics, she competed in the Women's 200 metres and was part of the Colombian 4 x 100 metre team.

== Personal bests ==
- 100 metres – 11.54 (+0.2) – Cali, Colombia, 2002
- 200 metres – 22.90 (+0.7) – Armenia, Colombia, 2005
- 400 metres – 51.58 – São Paulo, Brazil, 2011

== Competition record ==
Year	Competition	Venue	Position	Event	Notes
Representing Colombia
1998	South American Junior Championships	Córdoba, Argentina	1st	200 m	24.16 (wind: +0.9 m/s)
1998	South American Junior Championships	Córdoba, Argentina	2nd	400 m	54.47
1998	South American Junior Championships	Córdoba, Argentina	2nd	4 × 100 m	47.27
1998	South American Junior Championships	Córdoba, Argentina	2nd	4 × 400 m	3:51.30
1998	South American U18 Championships	Manaus, Brazil	1st	200 m	24.35 (wind: +0.7 m/s)
1998	South American U18 Championships	Manaus, Brazil	1st	400 m	55.40
1998	South American U18 Championships	Manaus, Brazil	3rd	4 × 100 m	48.87
1998	South American U18 Championships	Manaus, Brazil	3rd	4 × 400 m	3:56.12
1999	South American Championships	Bogotá, Colombia	1st	4 × 400 m	3:32.74
1999	Pan American Junior Championships	Tampa, United States	6th	200 m	24.11 (wind: +1.7 m/s)
1999	Pan American Junior Championships	Tampa, United States	1st	400 m	52.43
1999	Pan American Junior Championships	Tampa, United States	4th	4 × 100 m	46.17
1999	World U18 Championships	Bydgoszcz, Poland	3rd	400 m	52.39
1999	Pan American Games	Winnipeg, Canada	6th	4 × 400 m	3:32.87
1999	South American Junior Championships	Concepción, Chile	1st	200 m	23.78 (wind: +1.0 m/s)
1999	South American Junior Championships	Concepción, Chile	1st	400 m	54.38
1999	South American Junior Championships	Concepción, Chile	1st	4 × 100 m	45.87
1999	South American Junior Championships	Concepción, Chile	1st	4 × 400 m	3:44.40
2000	Ibero-American Championships	Rio de Janeiro, Brazil	1st	400 m	53.00
2000	Ibero-American Championships	Rio de Janeiro, Brazil	1st	4 × 100 m	44.81
2000	Ibero-American Championships	Rio de Janeiro, Brazil	1st	4 × 400 m	3:34.51
2000	CAC Junior Championships (U20)	San Juan, Puerto Rico	3rd	200 m	24.27 w (wind: +2.5 m/s)
2000	CAC Junior Championships (U20)	San Juan, Puerto Rico	3rd	400 m	54.54
2000	Olympic Games	Sydney, Australia	35th (h)	400 m	53.34
2000	South American Junior Championships	São Leopoldo, Brazil	1st	200 m	24.23 w (wind: +2.9 m/s)
2000	World U20 Championships	Santiago, Chile	3rd	400m	53.30
2000	World U20 Championships	Santiago, Chile	—	4 × 400 m relay	DQ
2001	South American Championships	Manaus, Brazil	3rd	400 m	53.29
2001	South American Championships	Manaus, Brazil	2nd	4 × 100 m	45.43
2001	South American Championships	Manaus, Brazil	2nd	4 × 400 m	3:40.27
2001	Bolivarian Games	Ambato, Ecuador	1st	400 m	52.73 A
2001	South American Junior Championships	Santa Fe, Argentina	1st	200 m	23.67 (wind: -0.5 m/s)
2001	South American Junior Championships	Santa Fe, Argentina	1st	400 m	54.06
2001	South American Junior Championships	Santa Fe, Argentina	2nd	4 × 100 m	45.92
2001	Pan American Junior Championships	Santa Fe, Argentina	1st	200 m	23.88 w (wind: +3.0 m/s)
2001	Pan American Junior Championships	Santa Fe, Argentina	1st	400 m	53.38
2001	Pan American Junior Championships	Santa Fe, Argentina	3rd	4 × 100 m	46.89
2002	Ibero-American Championships	Guatemala City, Guatemala	4th	100 m	11.59 w (wind: +2.3 m/s)
2002	Ibero-American Championships	Guatemala City, Guatemala	3rd	200 m	23.47 w (wind: +2.7 m/s)
2002	Ibero-American Championships	Guatemala City, Guatemala	2nd	4 × 100 m	44.44
2002	Ibero-American Championships	Guatemala City, Guatemala	2nd	4 × 400 m	3:33.35
2002	Central American and Caribbean Games	San Salvador, El Salvador	4th	100 m	11.69 w (wind: +2.3 m/s)
2002	Central American and Caribbean Games	San Salvador, El Salvador	2nd	200 m	23.73 (wind: 0.0 m/s)
2003	Pan American Games	Santo Domingo, Dominican Republic	7th	200 m	23.34
2003	Pan American Games	Santo Domingo, Dominican Republic	5th	4 × 100 m	45.13
2004	South American U23 Championships	Barquisimeto, Venezuela	1s (Note: Guest final out of competition)	4 × 100 m relay	43.46
2004	Ibero-American Championships	Huelva, Spain	3rd	4 × 400 m	3:33.95
2004	Olympic Games	Athens, Greece	10th (h)	4 × 100 m	43.30
2005	South American Championships	Cali, Colombia	5th (h)	400 m	54.85 (Note: Did not finish in the final.)
2005	South American Championships	Cali, Colombia	1st	4 × 100 m	43.17
2005	South American Championships	Cali, Colombia	2nd	4 × 400 m	3:36.95
2005	World Championships	Helsinki, Finland	6th	4 × 100 m	43.07
2005	Bolivarian Games	Armenia, Colombia	2nd	200 m	22.90 (wind: +0.7 m/s)
2005	Bolivarian Games	Armenia, Colombia	1st	400 m	53.08
2005	Bolivarian Games	Armenia, Colombia	1st	4 × 100 m relay	45.61
2005	Bolivarian Games	Armenia, Colombia	1st	4 × 400 m relay	3:35.25
2006	Ibero-American Championships	Ponce, Puerto Rico	1st	400 m	52.87
2006	Ibero-American Championships	Ponce, Puerto Rico	3rd	4 × 100 m	44.79
2006	Ibero-American Championships	Ponce, Puerto Rico	2nd	4 × 400 m	3:37.71
2006	Central American and Caribbean Games	Cartagena, Colombia	4th	400 m	52.37
2006	Central American and Caribbean Games	Cartagena, Colombia	2nd	4 × 100 m	44.32
2006	Central American and Caribbean Games	Cartagena, Colombia	5th	4 × 400 m	3:41.42
2008	Ibero-American Championships	Iquique, Chile	5th	400 m	54.03
2008	Ibero-American Championships	Iquique, Chile	3rd	4 × 400 m	3:39.46
2008	Central American and Caribbean Championships	Cali, Colombia	12th (h)	400 m	53.51
2008	Central American and Caribbean Championships	Cali, Colombia	4th	4 × 400 m	3:39.45
2009	South American Championships	Lima, Peru	1st	200 m	23.73
2009	South American Championships	Lima, Peru	1st	400 m	52.62
2009	South American Championships	Lima, Peru	1st	4 × 100 m	44.18
2009	South American Championships	Lima, Peru	2nd	4 × 400 m	3:35.83
2009	Central American and Caribbean Championships	Havana, Cuba	2nd	400 m	51.90
2009	Central American and Caribbean Championships	Havana, Cuba	2nd	4 × 100 m	43.67
2009	World Championships	Berlin, Germany	17th (sf)	400 m	51.91
2009	World Championships	Berlin, Germany	8th	4 × 100 m	43.71
2009	Bolivarian Games	Armenia, Colombia	2nd	200 m	23.50 (wind: +0.1 m/s)
2010	Central American and Caribbean Games	Mayagüez, Puerto Rico	7th	400 m	54.06
2010	Central American and Caribbean Games	Mayagüez, Puerto Rico	2nd	4 × 400 m	3:33.03
2011	South American Championships	Buenos Aires, Argentina	2nd	200 m	23.22
2011	South American Championships	Buenos Aires, Argentina	1st	400 m	52.14
2011	South American Championships	Buenos Aires, Argentina	1st	4 × 100 m	44.11
2011	Central American and Caribbean Championships	Mayagüez, Puerto Rico	6th (h)	200 m	23.45
2011	Central American and Caribbean Championships	Mayagüez, Puerto Rico	3rd	400 m	51.90
2011	World Championships	Daegu, South Korea	17th (sf)	400 m	52.29
2011	World Championships	Daegu, South Korea	9th (h)	4 × 100 m	43.53
2011	Pan American Games	Guadalajara, Mexico	5th	400 m	52.18
2011	Pan American Games	Guadalajara, Mexico	3rd	4 × 100 m	43.44
2011	Pan American Games	Guadalajara, Mexico	3rd	4 × 400 m	3:29.94 (NR)
2012	Olympic Games	London, United Kingdom	36th (h)	200 m	23.46
2012	Olympic Games	London, United Kingdom	11th (h)	4 × 100 m	43.21
2014	Central American and Caribbean Games	Xalapa, Mexico	5th	400m	53.67 A
2014	Central American and Caribbean Games	Xalapa, Mexico	3rd	4 × 400 m relay	3:34.14 A
