= Flávio Godoy =

Brazilian runner (born 1969)

Flávio de Oliveira Godoy (born 13 December 1969 in Petrópolis) is a retired Brazilian athlete who competed mostly in the 400 and 800 metres. He represented his country at the 1996 Summer Olympics, failing to qualify for the semifinals. He also competed at the 1997 World Indoor Championships and 2001 World Championships in addition to many medals at regional level.

== Competition record ==
Year	Competition	Venue	Position	Event	Notes
Representing Brazil
1991	South American Championships	Manaus, Brazil	1st	800 m	1:47.94
1996	Ibero-American Championships	Medellín, Colombia	2nd	800 m	1:47.11
1996	Olympic Games	Atlanta, United States	45th (h)	800 m	1:48.91
1997	World Indoor Championships	Paris, France	18th (h)	800 m	1:49.93
1997	World Indoor Championships	Paris, France	8th (h)	4 × 400 m relay	3:10.50
1997	South American Championships	Mar del Plata, Argentina	2nd	800 m	1:48.50
1998	Ibero-American Championships	Lisbon, Portugal	1st	800 m	1:50.05
1999	South American Championships	Bogotá, Colombia	2nd	800 m	1:50.00
2001	South American Championships	Manaus, Brazil	2nd	800 m	1:47.65
2001	South American Championships	Manaus, Brazil	2nd	4 × 400 m relay	3:06.64
2001	World Championships	Edmonton, Canada	29th (h)	400 m	46.13
2001	World Championships	Edmonton, Canada	4th	4 × 400 m relay	3:01.09
2002	Ibero-American Championships	Guatemala City, Guatemala	1st	4 × 400 m relay	3:05.71
2003	South American Championships	Barquisimeto, Venezuela	1st	4 × 400 m relay	3:05.28

== Personal bests ==
Outdoor

- 400 metres – 45.56 (Rio de Janeiro 2001)
- 800 metres – 1:46.22 (São Leopoldo 1998)

Indoor

- 800 metres – 1:49.93 (Paris 1997)
