= 2002 World Junior Championships in Athletics – Women's 400 metres hurdles =

The women's 400 metres hurdles event at the 2002 World Junior Championships in Athletics was held in Kingston, Jamaica, at National Stadium on 17 and 19 July.

== Medalists ==
Gold	Lashinda Demus; United States
Silver	Melaine Walker; Jamaica
Bronze	Camille Robinson; Jamaica

== Results ==
=== Final ===
19 July

Rank	Name	Nationality	Time	Notes
1st place, gold medalist(s)	Lashinda Demus	United States	54.70	
2nd place, silver medalist(s)	Melaine Walker	Jamaica	56.03	
3rd place, bronze medalist(s)	Camille Robinson	Jamaica	56.14	
4	Tiffany Ross	United States	56.52	
5	Zuzana Hejnová	Czech Republic	58.42	
6	Yusmelys García	Venezuela	58.46	
7	Monique Balsamo	South Africa	58.60	
8	Olga Nikolayeva	Russia	59.97	

=== Heats ===
17 July

==== Heat 1 ====
Rank	Name	Nationality	Time	Notes
1	Lashinda Demus	United States	57.38	Q
2	Camille Robinson	Jamaica	57.71	Q
3	Yusmelys García	Venezuela	59.07	q
4	Monique Balsamo	South Africa	59.25	q
5	Amanda Dias	Brazil	60.74	
6	Céline Landmann	France	60.85	

==== Heat 2 ====
Rank	Name	Nationality	Time	Notes
1	Tiffany Ross	United States	59.54	Q
2	Olga Nikolayeva	Russia	59.83	Q
3	Raquel da Costa	Brazil	59.93	
4	Sara Jander	Germany	60.53	
5	Gabriela Plocka	Poland	61.11	
6	Chisa Nishio	Japan	61.80	
7	Géraldine Lécefel	France	63.15	

==== Heat 3 ====
Rank	Name	Nationality	Time	Notes
1	Melaine Walker	Jamaica	57.39	Q
2	Zuzana Hejnová	Czech Republic	59.31	Q
3	Sachiko Eguchi	Japan	59.43	
4	Chantelle Terblanche	South Africa	59.98	
5	Katharina Gröb	Germany	61.27	
6	Lucy Jaramillo	Ecuador	62.97	

== Participation ==
According to an unofficial count, 19 athletes from 12 countries participated in the event.

- Brazil (2)
- Czech Republic (1)
- Ecuador (1)
- France (2)
- Germany (2)
- Jamaica (2)
- Japan (2)
- Poland (1)
- Russia (1)
- South Africa (2)
- United States (2)
- Venezuela (1)
