= Anderson Jorge dos Santos =

Brazilian sprinter (born 1972)

Personal information
- Born: 23 April 1972 (age 54) Além Paraíba, Minas Gerais, Brazil

Sport
- Sport: Track and field
Medal record
Representing Brazil
Pan American Games
Silver medal – second place	1999 Winnipeg	4x400m relay

Anderson Jorge Oliveira dos Santos (born 23 April 1972) is a retired Brazilian sprinter who competed predominantly in the 400 metres. He represented his country at the 2004 Summer Olympics, failing to qualify for the semifinals.

He has personal bests of 45.39 seconds outdoor (1999) and 47.47 seconds indoor (2001).

== Competition record ==
Year	Competition	Venue	Position	Event	Notes
Representing Brazil
1995	South American Championships	Manaus, Brazil	1st	4 × 400 m relay	3:04.93
1999	South American Championships	Bogotá, Colombia	1st	400 m	45.39 (A)
1999	South American Championships	Bogotá, Colombia	1st	4 × 400 m relay	3:02.09 (A)
1999	Pan American Games	Winnipeg, Canada	7th	400 m	45.77
1999	Pan American Games	Winnipeg, Canada	2nd	4 × 400 m relay	2:58.56
1999	World Championships	Seville, Spain	12th (sf)	400 m	45.67
1999	World Championships	Seville, Spain	17th (h)	4 × 400 m relay	3:05.70
2000	Ibero-American Championships	Rio de Janeiro, Brazil	2nd	400 m	45.59
2000	Ibero-American Championships	Rio de Janeiro, Brazil	1st	4 × 400 m relay	3:03.33
2001	South American Championships	Manaus, Brazil	2nd	4 × 400 m relay	2:06.64
2001	World Championships	Edmonton, Canada	16th (sf)	400 m	45.83
2001	World Championships	Edmonton, Canada	4th	4 × 400 m relay	3:01.09
2003	South American Championships	Barquisimeto, Venezuela	2nd	400 m	46.07
2003	South American Championships	Barquisimeto, Venezuela	1st	4 × 400 m relay	2:05.28
2003	World Championships	Paris, France	20th (sf)	400 m	45.94
2004	Ibero-American Championships	Huelva, Spain	5th	400 m	45.65
2004	Ibero-American Championships	Huelva, Spain	5th	4 × 400 m relay	3:06.19
2004	Olympic Games	Athens, Greece	57th (h)	400 m	48.77
2005	World Championships	Helsinki, Finland	31st (h)	400 m	46.32
2006	World Indoor Championships	Moscow, Russia	20th (h)	400 m	48.19
2006	Ibero-American Championships	Ponce, Puerto Rico	5th	400 m	47.09
2006	Ibero-American Championships	Ponce, Puerto Rico	3rd	4 × 400 m relay	3:25.18
2007	Pan American Games	Rio de Janeiro, Brazil	6th	4 × 400 m relay	3:05.87
