= Athletics at the 2005 Bolivarian Games =

Athletics at the XV Bolivarian Games
- Dates: August 18–21
- Host city: Armenia, Colombia
- Venue: Parque del Atletismo en el Estadio Centenario de Armenia
- Level: Senior
- Events: 47 (24 men, 23 women)
- Participation: 200 athletes from 5 nations
- Records set: 25 games records

Athletics competitions at the 2005 Bolivarian Games were held at the Parque del Atletismo en el Estadio Centenario de Armenia in Armenia, Colombia, between August 18–21, 2005.

Gold medal winners from Ecuador were published by the Comité Olímpico Ecuatoriano.

A total of 47 events were contested, 24 by men and 23 by women, resulting in 25 new Games records.

== Medal summary ==
Medal winners were published.

All results are marked as "affected by altitude" (A), because Armenia is located at 1,551 m above sea level.

=== Men ===
Event	Gold		Silver		Bronze	
100 metres (wind: -0.4 m/s)	Daniel Grueso (COL)	10.44 A	Harlin Echavarría (COL)	10.66 A	Luis Morán (ECU)	10.69 A
200 metres (wind: 0.4 m/s)	Daniel Grueso (COL)	20.75 GR A	Hawer Murillo (COL)	21.24 A	Hely Ollarves (VEN)	21.35 A
400 metres	Carlos Peña (COL)	46.65 A	Carlos Pérez (VEN)	46.72 A	Javier Mosquera (COL)	47.17 A
800 metres	Simoncito Silvera (VEN)	1:51.26 A	John Chávez (COL)	1:51.40 A	Fadrique Iglesias (BOL)	1:51.41 A
1500 metres	Byron Piedra (ECU)	3:44.62 GR A	John Chávez (COL)	3:45.97 A	Nico Herrera (VEN)	3:46.16 A
5000 metres	José Carrasco (COL)	14:23.61 A	John Cusi (PER)	14:23.76 A	Jacinto López (COL)	14:41.40 A
10000 metres	José Carrasco (COL)	30:06.24 A	Lervis Arias (VEN)	30:19.78 A	Jacinto López (COL)	30:45.45 A
Half Marathon	Diego Colorado (COL)	1:07:18 GR A	Silvio Guerra (ECU)	1:07:31 A	Franklin Tenorio (ECU)	1:07:39 A
3000 metres steeplechase	Emigdio Delgado (VEN)	9:05.93 A	Néstor Nieves (VEN)	9:07.13 A	Richard Arias (ECU)	9:09.72 A
110 metres hurdles (wind: -0.1 m/s)	Paulo Villar (COL)	13.44 GR A	Jackson Quiñónez (ECU)	13.53 A	Jonathan Davis (VEN)	14.63 A
400 metres hurdles	Paulo Villar (COL)	50.61 A	Víctor Solarte (VEN)	51.51 A	Ángel Rodríguez (VEN)	51.70 A
4 x 100 metres relay	Harlin Echavarría; Eduard Mena; Hawar Murillo; Daniel Grueso; Colombia	39.80 A	Juan Morillo; Jhonatan Medina; José Carabalí; Hely Ollarves; Venezuela	39.97 A		
4 x 400 metres relay	Amilkar Torres; Javier Mosquera; John López; Carlos Peña; Colombia	3:07.99 A	William Hernández; Simoncito Silvera; Carlos Pérez; Josner Rodríguez; Venezuela	3:08.16 A	Francisco Aguirre; Cristian Matute; Luis Morán; Marcos Rivadeneira; Ecuador	3:18.71 A
20 Kilometres Road Walk	Rolando Saquipay (ECU)	1:22:51 GR A	Jefferson Pérez (ECU)	1:24:22 A	Gustavo Restrepo (COL)	1:24:54 A
50 Kilometres Road Walk	Xavier Moreno (ECU)	4:09:07 GR A	Fausto Quinde (ECU)	4:10:37 A	Edwin Centeno (PER)	4:13:50 A
High jump	Gilmar Mayo (COL)	2.26 GR A	León Beltrán (VEN)	2.15 A	Daniel Rodríguez (VEN)	2.12 A
Pole vault	César González (VEN)	4.70 A	David Rojas (COL)	4.70 A	Víctor Medina (COL)	4.50 A
Long jump	Esteban Copland (VEN)	7.75 A (wind: 1.3 m/s)	Luis Tristán (PER)	7.74 A (wind: 1.5 m/s)	Marcos Ibargüen (COL)	7.64 A (wind: 0.9 m/s)
Triple jump	Johnny Rodríguez (VEN)	16.10 A (wind: -3.4 m/s)	Hugo Chila (ECU)	15.92 A (wind: -2.1 m/s)	Carlos Carabalí (COL)	15.83 A (wind: -1.7 m/s)
Shot put	Yojer Medina (VEN)	18.74 A	Geovanny García (COL)	18.50 A	Edmundo Martínez (VEN)	18.14 A
Discus throw^{†}	Jesús Parejo (VEN)	54.65 A	Héctor Hurtado (VEN)	52.15 A	Gabriel Hugo (ECU)	45.37 A
Hammer throw	Aldo Bello (VEN)	67.63 GR A	Eduardo Acuña (PER)	66.39 A	Jesús Parejo (VEN)	59.32 A
Javelin throw	Noraldo Palacios (COL)	77.37 GR A	Manuel Fuenmayor (VEN)	72.93 A	Johnny Viáfara (COL)	70.98 A
Decathlon	Andrés Mantilla (COL)	7352 GR A	Juan Jaramillo (VEN)	7228 A	Oscar Mina (ECU)	6090 A

==== Notes ====
^{†}: Yojer Medina from Venezuela came in third in the discus throw event achieving 50.76 m, but he was not entitled to a bronze medal; only two medals per country.

=== Women ===
Event	Gold		Silver		Bronze	
100 metres^{*} (wind: 1.6 m/s)	Felipa Palacios (COL)	11.18 GR, NR A	Melisa Murillo (COL)	11.22 A	Ana Caicedo (ECU)	11.69 A
200 metres^{**} (wind: 0.7 m/s)	Felipa Palacios (COL)	22.85 GR, NR A	Norma González (COL)	22.90 A	Fiorela Molina (VEN)	23.10 A
400 metres	Norma González (COL)	53.08 A	Lucy Jaramillo (ECU)	53.76 A	María Idrobo (COL)	54.06 A
800 metres	Rosibel García (COL)	2:01.57 GR A	Jenny Mejías (VEN)	2:07.80 A	Muriel Coneo (COL)	2:11.14 A
1500 metres	Rosibel García (COL)	4:29.16 A	Mónica Amboya (ECU)	4:36.11 A	Ángela Figueroa (COL)	4:38.42 A
5000 metres	Bertha Sánchez (COL)	17:40.58 A	María Elena Calle (ECU)	17:46.39 A	Rosa Chacha (ECU)	17:48.63 A
10,000 metres	Martha Tenorio (ECU)	34:36.66 GR A	Bertha Sánchez (COL)	35:25.39 A	Raquel Aceituno (PER)	35:29.16 A
Half Marathon	Sandra Ruales (ECU)	1:20:12 GR A	Norelis Lugo (VEN)	1:22:11 A	Iglandini González (COL)	1:22:51 A
3000 metres steeplechase	Mónica Amboya (ECU)	10:35.65 GR A	Ángela Figueroa (COL)	10:41.93 A	Yolanda Caballero (COL)	10:51.85 A
100 metres hurdles (wind: -1.2 m/s)	Brigith Merlano (COL)	13.62 A	Princesa Oliveros (COL)	13.71 A	Sandrine Legenort (VEN)	14.07 A
4 x 100 metres relay	Melisa Murillo; Felipa Palacios; Darlenis Obregón; Norma González; Colombia	45.61 A	Yaudelis Barbosa; Jackeline Carabalí; Fiorela Molina; Leidys Molero; Venezuela	46.08 A	Ana Caicedo; Jessica Perea; Jasmin Caicedo; Paola Sánchez; Ecuador	46.69 A
4 x 400 metres relay	Rosibel García; María Idrobo; Felipa Palacios; Norma González; Colombia	3:35.25 GR A	Fiorela Molina; Helen Delgado; Yenny Mejías; Yusmelys García; Venezuela	3:41.13 A	Karina Caicedo; Pamela Freile; Lucy Jaramillo; Erika Chávez; Ecuador	3:45.12 A
20 Kilometres Road Walk	Geovana Irusta (BOL)	1:39:14 GR A	Sandra Zapata (COL)	1:41:07 A	Mabel Oncebay (PER)	1:43:26 A
400 metres hurdles	Lucy Jaramillo (ECU)	57.58 GR A	Princesa Oliveros (COL)	58.35 A	Yusmelys García (VEN)	60.19 A
High jump	Caterine Ibargüen (COL)	1.91 GR A	Marielys Rojas (VEN)	1.80 A	Tatiana Rodríguez (COL)	1.65 A
Pole vault	Milena Agudelo (COL)	4.21 GR A	Karina Quejada (COL)	3.50 A	María Isabel Ferrand (PER)	3.40 A
Long jump^{***}	Caterine Ibargüen (COL)	6.54 GR A (wind: 0.7 m/s)	Helena Guerrero (COL)	6.05 A (wind: -1.6 m/s)	Ana Caicedo (ECU)	5.98 A (wind: 0.7 m/s)
Triple jump	Johanna Triviño (COL)	13.90 GR A (wind: 2.0 m/s)	Caterine Ibargüen (COL)	13.64 A (wind: 1.9 m/s)	Jennifer Arveláez (VEN)	13.52 A (wind: -0.6 m/s)
Shot put	Luz Dary Castro (COL)	16.46 GR A	Ahymará Espinoza (VEN)	15.17 A	Eli Moreno (COL)	13.99 A
Discus throw	Luz Dary Castro (COL)	53.34 A	María Cubillán (VEN)	48.94 A	Karina Díaz (ECU)	45.42 A
Hammer throw	Johana Ramírez (COL)	61.91 A	Rosa Rodríguez (VEN)	61.73 A	Eli Moreno (COL)	59.99 A
Javelin throw	Zuleima Araméndiz (COL)	54.78 A	María González (VEN)	50.58 A	Jenny Llulluna (ECU)	46.74 A
Heptathlon	Thaimara Rivas (VEN)	5461 GR A	Nasly Perea (COL)	5198 A	Diana Ibargüen (COL)	5134 A

==== Notes ====
^{*}: Yomara Hinestroza from Colombia came in third in the 100 metres competition in 11.56 s, but she was not entitled to get a bronze medal (only two medals per country).

^{**}: Darlenis Obregón from Colombia came in third in the 200 metres competition in 23.10 s, but she was not entitled to get a bronze medal (only two medals per country).

^{***}: Johanna Triviño from Colombia came in third in the long jump competition achieving 6.04 m (0.7 m/s), but she was not entitled to get a bronze medal (only two medals per country).

== Medal table (unofficial) ==
* Host nation (Colombia)

Rank	Nation	Gold	Silver	Bronze	Total
1	Colombia*	30	17	17	64
2	Venezuela	9	19	11	39
3	Ecuador	7	8	13	28
4	Bolivia	1	0	1	2
5	Peru	0	3	4	7
Totals (5 entries)		47	47	46	140

== Participation ==
According to an unofficial count, at least 200 athletes from 5 countries participated.

- Bolivia (10)
- Colombia (66)
- Ecuador (45)
- Peru (13)
- Venezuela (66)
