= Guillermo Dongo =

Surinamese sprinter

Guillermo Dongo (born 8 March 1982) is a former Surinamese sprinter, who competed in the men's 100 m competition in the 2000 Summer Olympics. He scored a time of 11.10, not enough to advance past through his heat. His personal best of 10.5, was achieved the same year. He is from Paramaribo.
