= Miguel Calvo =

Spanish biochemist, mineralogist and professor (b. 1955)

Miguel Calvo Rebollar
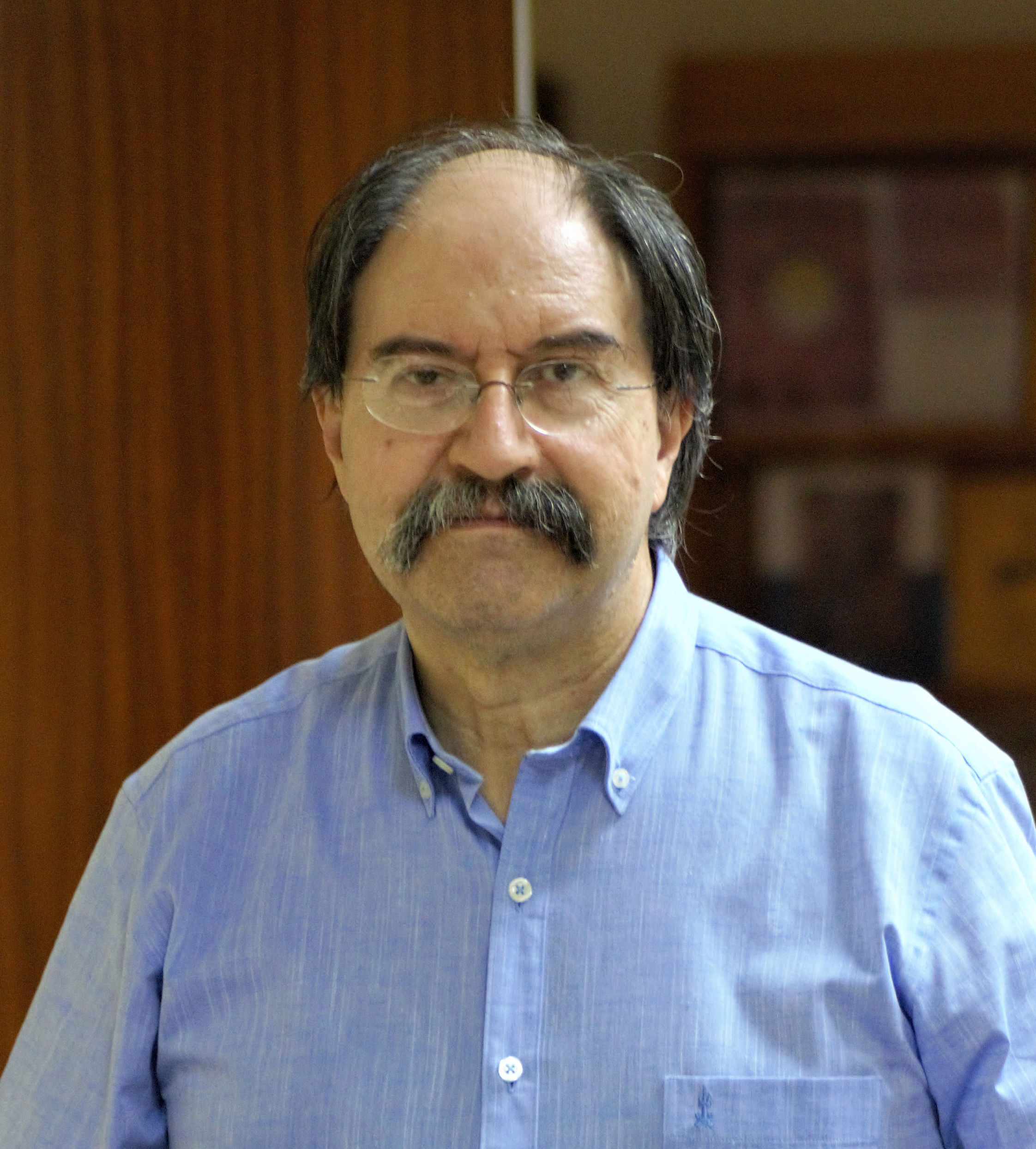
- Miguel Calvo Rebollar
- Born: 5 July 1955; Soria, Spain
- Education: University of Zaragoza
- Scientific career
- Fields: Biochemist; Mineralogist
- Workplaces: University of Zaragoza
- Doctoral advisor: Francisco Grande Covián

Miguel Calvo Rebollar (Soria, July 5, 1955) is a Spanish biochemist, mineralogist and professor at Zaragoza University, Spain.

== Biography ==
Miguel Calvo Rebollar was born in Soria, Spain. He studied chemistry at the Faculty of Sciences of the University of Zaragoza. He received his bachelor's degree in 1978 and his PhD in 1983. Her doctoral thesis, on the relationship between alpha-fetoprotein and the metabolism of essential fatty acids during development, was supervised by Dr. Francisco Grande Covian. Between 1985 and 1986, he conducted a postdoctoral research stay at the Institut de Recherches Scientifiques sur le Cancer, in Villejuif (París), in the group led by Dr. José Uriel to study the transport of the polyunsaturated fatty acids bound to proteins.

In 1986, he was appointed as a senior lecturer in the Department of Food Science and Technology in the Zaragoza Faculty of Veterinary Science. That same year, as principal investigator, he formed in Zaragoza University the research group “Biochemistry of Milk Proteins” to study the biological properties of milk proteins, mainly those of lactoferrin and beta-lactoglobulin. Also the effect of industrial processing on them, and particularly their possible usefulness in the preparation of infant foods. This group received the recognition from the Government of Aragon that same year, and has maintained it to this day.

In 1999 he received the Ordesa Prize from the Spanish Society of Pediatric Gastroenterology, Hepatology, and Nutrition for the study of the influence of thermal processing in infant foods. In his research work, he has supervised fifteen doctoral theses and published more than one hundred articles in scientific journals.

He has developed immunochemical analysis techniques and registered eight patents with the University of Zaragoza for methods to detect fraud in food production, as well as for detecting the presence of hidden allergens or genetically modified maize. He received the Idea-2001 Prize from Instituto Aragonés de Fomento for a spin-off project that gave rise to the company Zeu-Inmunotec (now Zeulab). In 2006 he was appointed as a full professor at the Zaragoza University. Upon retiring, in 2025, he was named professor emeritus at the same university.

Miguel Calvo has been a mineral collector since a very young age and has maintained this activity throughout his life, developing it from both a scientific perspective and in the communication of the mineralogy of Spain and the history of mining. He has assembled a collection of around 10.000 mineral specimens.

This collection has served him for over twenty years of work in preparing the book Minerales y minas de España (Minerals and Mines of Spain), published between 2003 and 2018 in nine volumes, totaling more than 5,000 pages. The work reviews approximately ten thousand Spanish mineral deposits, providing detailed geographic locations, the minerals found in each, and the characteristics of the specimens. For the most important mines, such as Almadén, Las Médulas, Rio Tinto, Sierra Menera, Áliva, and Remolinos, historical details As a photographic complement, he published in collaboration with Christian Rewitzer Atlas de minerales de España—Atlas of Spanish Minerals, a bilingual Spanish-English edition featuring 2,219 photos of 927 species.

As part of the European project MOMAr (Models of Management for Singular Rural Heritage), under Interreg Europe, funded by the European Union and coordinated by the Diputación Provincial de Zaragoza (Provincial Council of Zaragoza), he authored two books aimed at promoting the tourist use of the province’s mining heritage: one on former salt mines and saltworks and another on coal mines remains.

As a collaborator at the Museum of Natural Sciences of the University of Zaragoza, he organized, as curator, a temporary exhibition in 2019 to mark the International Year of the Periodic Table of Chemical Elements, titled Construyendo la Tabla Periódica (Building the Periodic Table). He also curated the temporary exhibition Una pizca de sal (A Pinch of Salt), held from November 13, 2023, to February 3, 2024. Another exhibition he curated was Gemas de España. Tesoros de nuestra tierra (Gems of Spain, Treasures of Our Land), which took place from November 13, 2023, to February 3, 2026. Each of these exhibitions was accompanied by the publication of a book with the same title. He has reviewed and reorganized the three historical mineral collections of the University of Zaragoza: the one from the Geology Section of the Faculty of Sciences, the Longinos Navás Collection located in the University’s Museum of Natural Sciences, and the collection that belonged to the geologist Lucas Mallada, preserved at the Faculty of Human Sciences and Education on the Huesca Campus.

He has published articles on the mineralogy of Spanish localities in Revista de Minerales (which has an English version, Mineral-Up), as well as in the Mineralogical Record, Lapis, Le Regne Mineral, Bocamina, Boletín Geológico y Minero, and others. He has also published papers on the history of mining. One of these, “Dinero no veían, solo fichas. El pago de salarios en las salitreras de Chile hasta 1925” (They Saw No Money, Only Tokens: Wage Payments in the Chilean Saltpeter Offices until 1925”, was awarded the Francisco Javier Ayala Carcedo Prize. As a science communicator, he has been an active critic of pseudoscience and food myths in the media.

== Selected publications ==
- Calvo, Miguel (2003). Minerales y Minas de España. Vol. I: Elementos (in Spanish). Vitoria: Museo de Ciencias Naturales de Álava. p. 156.
- Calvo, Miguel (2003). Minerales y Minas de España. Vol. II: Sulfuros y sulfosales (in Spanish). Vitoria: Museo de Ciencias Naturales de Álava. p. 705.
- Calvo, Miguel (2006). Minerales y Minas de España. Vol. III: Halogenuros (in Spanish). Vitoria: Museo de Ciencias Naturales de Álava. p. 267.
- Calvo, Miguel (2008). Minerales de Aragón (in Spanish). Zaragoza: Prames. p. 463.
- Calvo, Miguel (2009). Minerales y Minas de España. Vol. IV: Óxidos e hidróxidos (in Spanish). Madrid: Fundación Gómez Pardo, Escuela Técnica Superior de Ingenieros de Minas de Madrid. p. 751.
- Calvo, Miguel (2012). Minerales y Minas de España. Vol. V: Carbonatos y nitratos. Boratos (in Spanish). Madrid: Fundación Gómez Pardo, Escuela Técnica Superior de Ingenieros de Minas de Madrid. p. 711.
- Calvo, Miguel (2014). Minerales y Minas de España. Vol. VI: Sulfatos (Seleniatos, Teluratos), Cromatos, Molibdatos y Wolframatos (in Spanish). Madrid: Fundación Gómez Pardo, Escuela Técnica Superior de Ingenieros de Minas de Madrid. p. 653.
- Calvo, Miguel (2015). Minerales y Minas de España. Vol. VII: Fosfatos, Arseniatos y Vanadatos (in Spanish). Madrid: Fundación Gómez Pardo, Escuela Técnica Superior de Ingenieros de Minas de Madrid. p. 479.
- Calvo, Miguel (2016). Minerales y Minas de España. Vol. VIII: Cuarzo y otros minerales de la sílice (in Spanish). Madrid: Fundación Gómez Pardo, Escuela Técnica Superior de Ingenieros de Minas de Madrid. p. 399.
- Calvo, Miguel (2018). Minerales y Minas de España. Vol. IX: Silicatos (in Spanish). Madrid: Fundación Gómez Pardo, Escuela Técnica Superior de Ingenieros de Minas de Madrid. p. 767.
- Calvo, Miguel (2018). Lo que el Ebro se llevó: Minas, trenes y barcos en la cuenca carbonífera de Mequinenza (in Spanish). Zaragoza: Prames. p. 201.
- Calvo, Miguel (2019). Construyendo la Tabla Periódica (in Spanish). Zaragoza: Prames; Museo de Ciencias Naturales de la Universidad de Zaragoza. p. 407.
- Calvo, Miguel; Rewitzer, Christian (2022). Atlas de minerales de España. Atlas of Spanish minerals. Zaragoza: Prames. p. 384.
- Calvo, Miguel (2022). La sal en la provincia de Zaragoza (in Spanish). Zaragoza: Diputación Provincial de Zaragoza. p. 93.
- Calvo, Miguel; Calvo Sevillano, Gonzalo (2023). Una pizca de sal: Uso, obtención e historia de la sal en el mundo (in Spanish). Zaragoza: Prames. p. 382.
- Calvo, Miguel (2024). El carbón en la provincia de Zaragoza (in Spanish). Zaragoza: Diputación Provincial de Zaragoza. p. 95.
- Calvo, Miguel (2025). Gemas de España: Tesoros de nuestra tierra (in Spanish). Zaragoza: Prames. p. 367.
