= Jennifer Arveláez =

Venezuelan athlete (born 1982)

Jennifer Irina Arveláez Padrin (born 28 October 1982) is a retired Venezuelan athlete who competed in the long jump and triple jump. She won multiple medals on regional level.

Her personal bests are 6.03 metres (Ponce 2006) in the long jump and 13.76 metres in the triple jump (Barinas 2007).

== Competition record ==
Year	Competition	Venue	Position	Event	Notes
Representing Venezuela
1998	South American Junior Championships	Córdoba, Argentina	9th	Long jump	5.18 m
1998	South American Junior Championships	Córdoba, Argentina	3rd	Triple jump	12.31 m
1998	South American Youth Championships	Manaus, Brazil	3rd	Long jump	5.60 m
1998	South American Youth Championships	Manaus, Brazil	1st	Triple jump	12.21 m
1999	South American Junior Championships	Concepción, Chile	9th (h)	100 m H	16.08 s
1999	South American Junior Championships	Concepción, Chile	2nd	Triple jump	12.87 m
2000	Ibero-American Championships	Rio de Janeiro, Brazil	4th	Triple jump	12.92 m
2000	Central American and Caribbean Junior Championships	San Juan, Puerto Rico	4th	Long jump	5.96 m
2000	Central American and Caribbean Junior Championships	San Juan, Puerto Rico	2nd	Triple jump	13.10 m (w)
2000	South American Junior Championships	São Leopoldo, Brazil	1st	4 × 100 m	46.87 s
2000	South American Junior Championships	São Leopoldo, Brazil	2nd	Long jump	5.95 m (w)
2000	South American Junior Championships	São Leopoldo, Brazil	2nd	Triple jump	13.36 m
2000	World Junior Championships	Santiago, Chile	9th	Triple jump	13.01 m (wind: +1.1 m/s)
2000	World Junior Championships	Santiago, Chile	10th (h)	4 × 100 m relay	46.14
2001	South American Championships	Manaus, Brazil	3rd	4 × 100 m	47.22 s
2001	South American Championships	Manaus, Brazil	6th	Long jump	5.82 m
2001	South American Championships	Manaus, Brazil	4th	Triple jump	13.35 m
2001	South American Junior Championships	Santa Fe, Argentina	5th	Long jump	5.62 m
2001	South American Junior Championships	Santa Fe, Argentina	2nd	Triple jump	13.18 m
2001	Pan American Junior Championships	Santa Fe, Argentina	2nd	Long jump	5.98 m
2001	Pan American Junior Championships	Santa Fe, Argentina	3rd	Triple jump	13.24 m
2002	Ibero-American Championships	Guatemala City, Guatemala	5th	Long jump	5.88 m
2002	Ibero-American Championships	Guatemala City, Guatemala	2nd	Triple jump	13.65 m
2002	Central American and Caribbean Games	San Salvador, El Salvador	4th	Long jump	5.71 m (wind: -2.2 m/s)
2002	Central American and Caribbean Games	San Salvador, El Salvador	3rd	Triple jump	13.10 m (wind: -1.0 m/s)
2003	South American Championships	Barquisimeto, Venezuela	5th	Long jump	5.78 m
2003	South American Championships	Barquisimeto, Venezuela	4th	Triple jump	12.83 m
2004	South American U23 Championships	Barquisimeto, Venezuela	5th	Long jump	5.91 m (wind: +2.0 m/s)
2004	South American U23 Championships	Barquisimeto, Venezuela	2nd	Triple jump	13.16 m (wind: +0.9 m/s)
2005	Central American and Caribbean Championships	Nassau, Bahamas	12th	Long jump	5.75 m (w)
2005	Central American and Caribbean Championships	Nassau, Bahamas	3rd	Triple jump	13.09 m
2005	South American Championships	Cali, Colombia	4th	4 × 100 m	46.24 s
2005	South American Championships	Cali, Colombia	5th	Long jump	5.81 m
2005	South American Championships	Cali, Colombia	4th	Triple jump	13.49 m
2006	Ibero-American Championships	Ponce, Puerto Rico	5th	Long jump	6.03 m
2006	Ibero-American Championships	Ponce, Puerto Rico	4th	Triple jump	13.19 m
2006	Central American and Caribbean Games	Cartagena, Colombia	9th	Long jump	5.71 m
2006	Central American and Caribbean Games	Cartagena, Colombia	4th	Triple jump	13.48 m
2007	South American Championships	São Paulo, Brazil	3rd	Triple jump	13.52 m
2008	Ibero-American Championships	Iquique, Chile	3rd	Triple jump	12.84 m
