= Gabriel Simon =

Argentine sprinter

Gabriel Simon (born 25 October 1974) is a former Argentine sprinter who competed in the men's 100m at the 2000 Summer Olympics. He recorded a 10.56, placing him 5th in his heat, not allowing him to advance. His personal best is a 10.23, set the year before.
