= Lucimar de Moura =

Brazilian sprinter (born 1974)

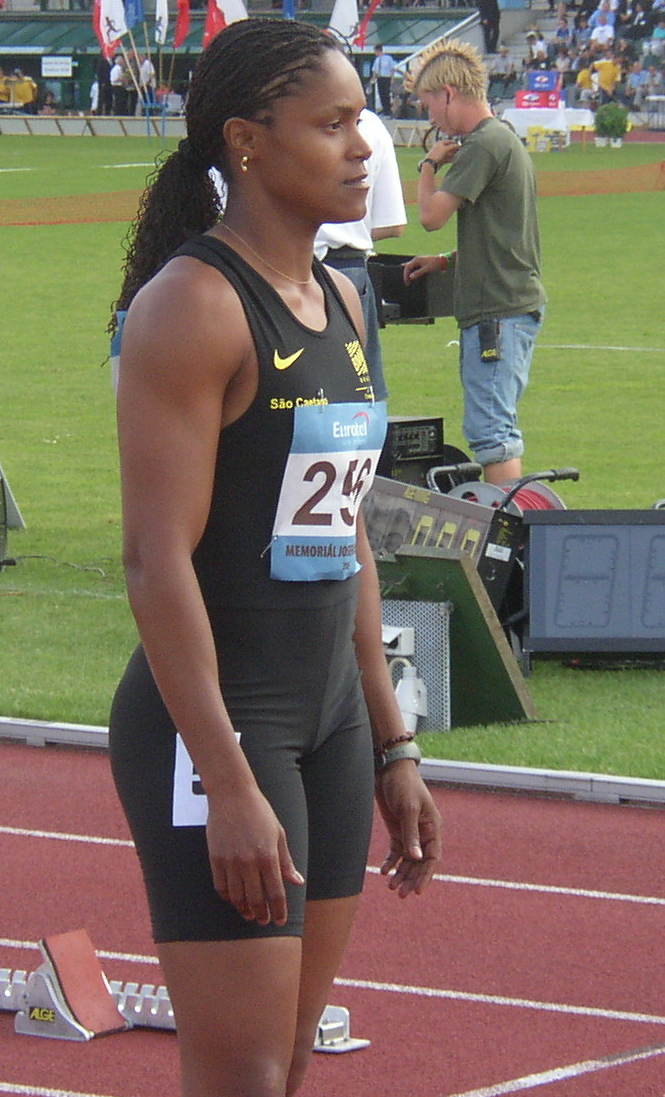

Personal information
- Full name: Lucimar Aparecida de Moura
- Nationality: Brazil
- Born: 22 March 1974 (age 52) Timóteo, Minas Gerais, Brazil
- Height: 1.67 m (5 ft 6 in)
- Weight: 63 kg (139 lb)

Sport
- Sport: Athletics
Medal record
Women's athletics
Representing Brazil
Olympic Games
Bronze medal – third place	2008 Beijing	4 × 100 m relay
Pan American Games
Silver medal – second place	1999 Winnipeg	200 metres
South American Championships in Athletics
Gold medal – first place	1997 Mar del Plata	100 metres
Gold medal – first place	1999 Bogotá	100 metres
Gold medal – first place	1999 Bogotá	200 metres
Gold medal – first place	2001 Manaus	100 metres
Gold medal – first place	2001 Manaus	4 × 100 metres relay
Gold medal – first place	2003 Barquisimeto	4 × 100 metres relay
Gold medal – first place	2005 Cali	100 metres
Gold medal – first place	2005 Cali	200 metres
Gold medal – first place	2006 Tunja	4 × 100 metres relay
Gold medal – first place	2007 São Paulo	100 metres
Gold medal – first place	2007 São Paulo	200 metres
Gold medal – first place	2007 São Paulo	4 × 100 metres relay
Gold medal – first place	2009 Lima	100 metres
Silver medal – second place	1997 Mar del Plata	200 metres
Silver medal – second place	1997 Mar del Plata	4 × 100 metres relay
Silver medal – second place	2003 Barquisimeto	100 metres
Silver medal – second place	2003 Barquisimeto	200 metres
Silver medal – second place	2005 Cali	4 × 100 metres relay
Silver medal – second place	2009 Lima	4 × 100 metres relay
Bronze medal – third place	2001 Manaus	200 metres
Ibero-American Championships
Silver medal – second place	2008 Iquique	100 metres
Silver medal – second place	2008 Iquique	4 × 100 metres relay
South American Youth Championships
Gold medal – first place	1990 Lima	Long jump
Bronze medal – third place	1990 Lima	Pentathlon
- Updated on 9 May 2013

Lucimar Aparecida de Moura (born 22 March 1974) is a Brazilian track and field athlete who competes in the sprint events. She represented her native country at the 2004 Summer Olympics in Athens, Greece, and won the silver medal in the women's 200 metres at the 1999 Pan American Games in Winnipeg, Canada.

== Career ==
At the 2008 Summer Olympics in Beijing she competed at the 100 metres sprint. In her first round heat she placed fourth behind Christine Arron, Lauryn Williams and Tahesia Harrigan, normally causing elimination. However her time of 11.60 was the seventh fastest losing time, which was enough to advance to the second round. There she failed to qualify for the semi-finals as her time of 11.67 was only the eighth and last time of her heat. Together with Rosemar Coelho Neto, Thaissa Presti and Rosângela Santos she also took part in the 4 × 100 m relay. In their first round heat they placed third behind Belgium and Great Britain, but in front of Nigeria. Their time of 43.38 seconds was the fifth time overall out of sixteen participating nations. With this result they qualified for the final in which they sprinted to a time of 43.14 seconds and the fourth place behind Nigeria, missing out on the bronze medal with 0.10 seconds. However, in 2016, the IOC stripped Russia of its Gold Medal due to doping, meaning Rosângela and her teammates inherited the bronze medal.

== Achievements ==
Year	Competition	Venue	Position	Event	Notes
Representing Brazil
1988	South American Youth Championships	Cuenca, Ecuador	5th (heat)	200 m	26.6 s
1988	South American Youth Championships	Cuenca, Ecuador	6th	4 × 100 m relay	49.9 s
1990	South American Youth Championships	Lima, Peru	1st	Long jump	5.81 m
1990	South American Youth Championships	Lima, Peru	3rd	Pentathlon	3056 pts
1992	World Junior Championships	Seoul, South Korea	22nd (qf)	100m	11.94 (wind: +1.6 m/s)
1992	World Junior Championships	Seoul, South Korea	24th (sf)	200m	24.86 (wind: +0.1 m/s)
2004	South American U23 Championships	Barquisimeto, Venezuela	2nd	4 × 100 m relay	43.49
2008	Olympic Games	Beijing, China	3rd	4 × 100 m relay	43.14
