= José Carabalí (athlete) =

Venezuelan sprinter (born 1970)

Personal information
- Full name: José Manuel Carabalí
- Born: January 6, 1970 (age 56)

Sport
- Country: Venezuela
- Sport: Men's Athletics
Medal record
Men's Athletics
Representing Venezuela
Central American and Caribbean Games
Bronze medal – third place	2002 San Salvador	200 m
Bolivarian Games
Silver medal – second place	2005 Armenia	4×100 m relay
South American Championships
Silver medal – second place	2003 Barquisimeto	4×100 m

José Manuel Carabalí (born January 6, 1970) is a retired male track and field athlete from Venezuela. He competed for his native South American country at the 2000 Summer Olympics in Sydney, Australia, where he was eliminated in the first round of the men's 4×100 metres relay, alongside Hely Ollarves, Juan Morillo, and José Peña.

== Achievements ==
Year	Competition	Venue	Position	Event	Notes
Representing Venezuela
2002	Central American and Caribbean Games	San Salvador, El Salvador	3rd	200m	21.13 (wind: -0.4 m/s)
2002	Central American and Caribbean Games	San Salvador, El Salvador	2nd	4 × 100 m relay	39.87
2004	South American U23 Championships	Barquisimeto, Venezuela	3rd (h)	200m	21.06 (wind: -0.6 m/s)
2005	Bolivarian Games	Armenia, Colombia	2nd	4 × 100 m relay	39.97 A
