= Yusmely García =

Venezuelan hurdler (born 1983)

Personal information
- Born: December 19, 1983 (age 42) Caracas, Venezuela

Sport
- Country: Venezuela
- Sport: Athletics
- Event: 400 m Hurdles
Medal record
Women's Athletics
Representing Venezuela
Bolivarian Games
| Silver medal – second place | 2001 Ambato | 400 m hurdles |
| Silver medal – second place | 2005 Armenia | 4x400 m relay |
| Bronze medal – third place | 2001 Ambato | 400 m |
| Bronze medal – third place | 2005 Armenia | 400 m hurdles |
CAC Junior Championships (U20)
| Gold medal – first place | 2002 Bridgetown | 400 m hurdles |
| Silver medal – second place | 2000 San Juan | 400 m hurdles |
| Silver medal – second place | 2002 Bridgetown | 4x400 m relay |
South American Youth Championships
| Gold medal – first place | 2000 Bogotá | 400 m |
| Gold medal – first place | 2000 Bogotá | 400 m hurdles |
| Gold medal – first place | 2000 Bogotá | 4x100 m relay |
| Silver medal – second place | 2000 Bogotá | 4x400 m relay |
| Bronze medal – third place | 1998 Manaus | 800 m |
- Updated on 13 May 2013

Yusmely García (born December 19, 1983, in Caracas, Venezuela) is a Venezuelan hurdler who represented her country in the 400 meter hurdles.

== Career ==
García is the Venezuelan National champion of 400 m hurdles. She holds the record of 57.09 seconds, set at the Venezuelan Nationals.

== Achievements ==
| Year | Competition | Venue | Position | Event | Notes |
Representing Venezuela
| 1998 | South American Youth Championships | Manaus, Brazil | 3rd | 800 m | 2:17.41 min |
| 1998 | South American Youth Championships | Manaus, Brazil | 4th | 1500 m | 4:49.09 min |
| 2000 | World Junior Championships | Santiago, Chile | 18th (h) | 400m hurdles | 60.09 |
| 2000 | World Junior Championships | Santiago, Chile | 10th (h) | 4 × 100 m relay | 46.14 |
| 2000 | South American Youth Championships | Bogotá, Colombia | 1st | 400 m | 53.94 s A |
| 2000 | South American Youth Championships | Bogotá, Colombia | 1st | 400 m hurdles | 61.63 s A |
| 2000 | South American Youth Championships | Bogotá, Colombia | 1st | 4 × 100 m relay | 45.99 s A |
| 2000 | South American Youth Championships | Bogotá, Colombia | 2nd | 4 × 400 m relay | 2:14.05 min A |
| 2001 | Bolivarian Games | Ambato, Ecuador | 3rd | 400 m | 54.94 s A |
| 2001 | Bolivarian Games | Ambato, Ecuador | 2nd | 400 m hurdles | 60.34 s A |
| 2002 | World Junior Championships | Kingston, Jamaica | 6th | 400m hurdles | 58.46 |
| 2002 | South American Junior Championships / South American Games | Belém, Brazil | 1st | 400m | 54.38 |
| 2002 | South American Junior Championships / South American Games | Belém, Brazil | 1st | 400m hurdles | 58.54 |
| 2002 | South American Junior Championships / South American Games | Belém, Brazil | 3rd | 4 × 400 m relay | 3:45.78 |
| 2004 | South American U23 Championships | Barquisimeto, Venezuela | 4th | 400m | 56.50 |
| 2004 | South American U23 Championships | Barquisimeto, Venezuela | 1st | 400m hurdles | 59.80 |
| 2005 | Bolivarian Games | Armenia, Colombia | 3rd | 400 m hurdles | 60.19 s A |
| 2005 | Bolivarian Games | Armenia, Colombia | 2nd | 4 × 400 m relay | 3:41.13 min A |
