= José Peña (sprinter) =

Venezuelan sprinter

José Peña Quevedo (born December 8, 1979) is a Venezuelan track and field sprinter. He competed for Venezuela at the 2000 Summer Olympics in Sydney, Australia competing in both the 100 metres and 4 x 100 metres relay. His relay team, which included José Carabalí, Hely Ollarves, and Juan Morillo, were eliminated in the first round. Peña's personal best in the 100 metres is 10.36 seconds which he recorded in San Felipe on April 5, 2001.
