= Juan Morillo (athlete) =

Venezuelan sprinter (born 1972)

Personal information
- Full name: Juan Alberto Morillo
- Born: May 20, 1972 (age 54)

Sport
- Country: Venezuela
- Sport: Men's Athletics
Medal record
Men's athletics
Representing Venezuela
Bolivarian Games
Silver medal – second place	2005 Armenia	4×100 m relay
Bronze medal – third place	2001 Ambato	100 m
South American Championships
Silver medal – second place	2003 Barquisimeto	4×100 m

Juan Alberto Morillo (born May 20, 1972) is a male track and field athlete from Venezuela. He competed for his native South American country at the 2000 Summer Olympics in Sydney, Australia, where he was eliminated in the first round of the men's 4×100 metres relay, alongside José Carabalí, Hely Ollarves, and José Peña.

== Achievements ==
Year	Competition	Venue	Position	Event	Notes
Representing Venezuela
2001	Bolivarian Games	Ambato, Ecuador	3rd	100 m	10.50 (wind: -0.9 m/s) A
2002	Central American and Caribbean Games	San Salvador, El Salvador	2nd	4 × 100 m relay	39.87
2005	Bolivarian Games	Armenia, Colombia	2nd	4 × 100 m relay	39.97 A
