= José Alejandro Semprún =

Venezuelan long-distance runner

Personal information
- Born: March 12, 1973 (age 52) La Guaira, Venezuela

Sport
- Sport: Track and field

José Alejandro Semprún (born March 12, 1973) is a male long-distance runner from Venezuela. He competed for his native South American country at the 2000 Summer Olympics, finishing in 79th place in the men's marathon. Semprún set his personal best (2:12.58) in the classic distance on February 6, 2000, in Caracas.

== Achievements ==
- All results regarding marathon, unless stated otherwise

Year	Competition	Venue	Position	Event	Notes
Representing Venezuela
1992	World Junior Championships	Seoul, South Korea	13th	10,000 metres	30:02.85
2000	Olympic Games	Sydney, Australia	79th	Marathon	3:00:02
