= Felipa Palacios =

Colombian sprinter (born 1975)

Personal information
- Full name: Felipa Alicia Palacios Hinestroza
- Nationality: Colombian
- Born: 1 December 1975 (age 50) Bojayá, Chocó, Colombia

Sport
- Country: Colombia
- Sport: Women's Athletics
Medal record
Women's Athletics
Representing Colombia
Pan American Games
Bronze medal – third place	1995 Mar del Plata	4×100 metres
Bronze medal – third place	1995 Mar del Plata	4×400 metres
Bronze medal – third place	1999 Winnipeg	200 metres
South American Games
Gold medal – first place	1994 Valencia	100 m
Gold medal – first place	1994 Valencia	200 m
Gold medal – first place	1998 Cuenca	200 m
Gold medal – first place	1998 Cuenca	400 m
Silver medal – second place	1998 Cuenca	100 m
Bolivarian Games
Gold medal – first place	1997 Arequipa	100 m
Gold medal – first place	1997 Arequipa	200 m
Gold medal – first place	2001 Ambato	200 m
Gold medal – first place	2005 Armenia	100 m
Gold medal – first place	2005 Armenia	200 m
Gold medal – first place	2005 Armenia	4×100 m relay
Gold medal – first place	2005 Armenia	4×400 m relay

Felipa Alicia Palacios Hinestroza (born 1 December 1975) is a Colombian retired track and field athlete, who competed in the sprint events.

== Career ==
She represented her native country in three consecutive Summer Olympics, starting in 1996. Palacios won the bronze medal in the women's 200 metres at the 1999 Pan American Games in Winnipeg, Canada.

== Achievements ==
Year	Competition	Venue	Position	Event	Notes
Representing Colombia
1994	South American Games	Valencia, Venezuela	1st	100 m	11.51
1994	South American Games	Valencia, Venezuela	1st	200 m	23.6
1997	Bolivarian Games	Arequipa, Peru	1st	100 m	11.15 w A
1997	Bolivarian Games	Arequipa, Peru	1st	200 m	22.74 w A
1998	Central American and Caribbean Games	Maracaibo, Venezuela	3rd	200 m	23.07
1998	Central American and Caribbean Games	Maracaibo, Venezuela	2nd	4 × 100 m relay	44.39
1998	South American Games	Cuenca, Ecuador	2nd	100 m	11.62 A
1998	South American Games	Cuenca, Ecuador	1st	200 m	22.78 GR A
1998	South American Games	Cuenca, Ecuador	1st	400 m	53.45 A
2001	Bolivarian Games	Ambato, Ecuador	1st	200 m	22.92 (wind: +0.9 m/s) A
2004	South American U23 Championships	Barquisimeto, Venezuela	1st (Note: Guest final out of competition)	4 × 100 m relay	43.46
2005	Bolivarian Games	Armenia, Colombia	1st	100 m	11.18 (wind: +1.6 m/s) GR A
2005	Bolivarian Games	Armenia, Colombia	1st	200 m	22.85 (wind: +0.7 m/s) GR A
2005	Bolivarian Games	Armenia, Colombia	1st	4 × 100 m relay	45.61 A
2005	Bolivarian Games	Armenia, Colombia	1st	4 × 400 m relay	3:35.25 GR A
