= Raphael de Oliveira =

Brazilian sprinter

Personal information
- Born: 5 February 1979 (age 47) São Paulo, Brazil

Sport
- Sport: Track and field
Medal record
Representing Brazil
World Championships
Bronze medal – third place	1999 Seville	4x100m relay
Pan American Games
Gold medal – first place	1999 Winnipeg	4x100m relay

Raphael Raymundo de Oliveira (born 5 February 1979) is a Brazilian former sprinter who competed in the 2000 Summer Olympics.
