= Hely Ollarves =

Venezuelan sprinter (born 1981)

Personal information
- Full name: Hely Domingo Ollarves Arias
- Born: July 17, 1981 (age 44) Caracas, Venezuela

Sport
- Country: Venezuela
- Sport: Men's Athletics
Medal record
Men's Athletics
Representing Venezuela
Bolivarian Games
Silver medal – second place	2005 Armenia	4 × 100 m relay
Bronze medal – third place	2005 Armenia	200 m
South American Championships
Silver medal – second place	2003 Barquisimeto	4 × 100 m

Hely Domingo Ollarves Arias (born July 17, 1981, in Caracas) is a male track and field athlete from Venezuela. He competed in the men's 4 × 100 metres relay at the 2000 Summer Olympics in Sydney, Australia, where he was eliminated in the first round alongside José Carabalí, Juan Morillo, and José Peña.

== Achievements ==
Year	Competition	Venue	Position	Event	Notes
Representing Venezuela
1998	World Junior Championships	Annecy, France	38th (h)	100 m	10.95 (wind: -0.5 m/s)
1998	World Junior Championships	Annecy, France	23rd (qf)	200 m	21.76 (wind: -0.9 m/s)
2000	World Junior Championships	Santiago, Chile	8th	100 m	10.64 (wind: +0.1 m/s)
2000	World Junior Championships	Santiago, Chile	34th (h)	200 m	22.07 (wind: +0.1 m/s)
2002	Central American and Caribbean Games	San Salvador, El Salvador	6th	200 m	21.29 (wind: -0.4 m/s)
2002	Central American and Caribbean Games	San Salvador, El Salvador	2nd	4 × 100 m relay	39.87
2004	South American U23 Championships	Barquisimeto, Venezuela	4th (h)	200 m	21.13 (wind: -0.6 m/s)
