= List of Colombian Athletics Championships winners =

The Colombian Athletics Championships (Spanish: Campeonato Colombiano de Atletismo) is an annual track and field competition which serves as the national championship for Colombia. It is organised by Colombian Athletics Federation (FECODATLE), Colombia's national governing body for the sport of athletics. The event was held for its 50th edition in 2005. Since 1992, the competition is held in conjunction with the National Games of Colombia when that competition is held, once every four years.

== Men ==
=== 100 metres ===
- 1991: Robinson Urrutia
- 1992: Wenceslao Ferrín
- 1993: ?
- 1994: Robinson Urrutia
- 1995: Robinson Urrutia
- 1996: Robinson Urrutia
- 1997: Leonardo Prevost (CUB)
- 1998: Robinson Urrutia
- 1999: Jimmy Pino
- 2000: John Córdoba
- 2001: John Córdoba
- 2002: Jimmy Pino
- 2003: Jimmy Pino
- 2004: John Córdoba
- 2005: Daniel Grueso
- 2006: Harlin Echavarría

=== 200 metres ===
- 1991: Nicolás Valencia
- 1992: Wenceslao Ferrín
- 1993: Luis Vega
- 1994: Wenceslao Ferrín
- 1995: Wenceslao Ferrín
- 1996: Wilson Cañizales
- 1997: Wilson Cañizales
- 1998: José Luis Herrera
- 1999: John Córdoba
- 2000: John Córdoba
- 2001: John Córdoba
- 2002: Jimmy Pino
- 2003: John Córdoba
- 2004: John Valoyes
- 2005: Daniel Grueso
- 2006: Daniel Grueso

=== 400 metres ===
- 1991: Nicolás Valencia
- 1992: Norman Popo
- 1993: Wilson Cañizales
- 1994: Wilson Cañizales
- 1995: Wenceslao Ferrín
- 1996: Wilson Cañizales
- 1997: Wenceslao Ferrín
- 1998: Julio César Rojas
- 1999: Llimy Rivas
- 2000: Milcíades Cantillo
- 2001: Jagnner Palacios
- 2002: John Chávez
- 2003: Julio César Rojas
- 2004: Carlos Peña
- 2005: Carlos Peña
- 2006: Yeimar Mosquera

=== 800 metres ===
- 1991: Javier Bermúdez
- 1992: Javier Bermúdez
- 1993: Víctor Cano
- 1994: Diego Córdoba
- 1995: Alcides Pinto
- 1996: Alcides Pinto
- 1997: John Chávez
- 1998: José Luis Hincapié
- 1999: José Luis Hincapié
- 2000: John Chávez
- 2001: José Bermúdez
- 2002: John Chávez
- 2003: José Bermúdez
- 2004: Edgar Rivera
- 2005: John Chávez
- 2006: John Chávez

=== 1500 metres ===
- 1991: Rafael Uribe
- 1992: Rafael Uribe
- 1993: Herder Vásquez
- 1994: Jacinto Navarrete
- 1995: Jacinto Navarrete
- 1996: Jacinto Navarrete
- 1997: Rolando Ortiz
- 1998: Emigdio Delgado (VEN)
- 1999: Mauricio Ladino
- 2000: Alonso Pérez
- 2001: José Perea
- 2002: Mauricio Ladino
- 2003: Mauricio Ladino
- 2004: Oscar Lesmes
- 2005: John Chávez
- 2006: John Chávez

=== 5000 metres ===
- 1991: Herder Vásquez
- 1992: Herder Vásquez
- 1993: Herder Vásquez
- 1994: Jacinto Navarrete
- 1995: Herder Vásquez
- 1996: Herder Vásquez
- 1997: Herder Vásquez
- 1998: Jacinto López
- 1999: Mauricio Ladino
- 2000: Diego Colorado
- 2001: William Naranjo
- 2002: William Naranjo
- 2003: Jacinto López
- 2004: Jacinto López
- 2005: Rolando Ortiz
- 2006: Javier Guarín

=== 10,000 metres ===
- 1991: Herder Vásquez
- 1992: Herder Vásquez
- 1993: Jacinto López
- 1994: Herder Vásquez
- 1995: Herder Vásquez
- 1996: Herder Vásquez
- 1997: Herder Vásquez
- 1998: Juan Gutiérrez
- 1999: Herder Vásquez
- 2000: Herder Vásquez
- 2001: William Roldán
- 2002: William Naranjo
- 2003: William Naranjo
- 2004: Jacinto López
- 2005: Jason Gutiérrez
- 2006: Jacinto López

=== Half marathon ===
- 2005: Herder Vásquez

=== Marathon ===
- 1991: ?
- 1992: Jaime Cuitiva
- 1993: ?
- 1994: ?
- 1995: ?
- 1996: ?
- 1997: ?
- 1998: ?
- 1999: ?
- 2000: Hugo Jiménez
- 2001: ?
- 2002: Jorge Real
- 2003: ?
- 2004: Jorge Real

=== 3000 metres steeplechase ===
- 1991: Leonardo García
- 1992: Wilson Munevar
- 1993: Leonardo García
- 1994: Gonzalo Vanegas
- 1995: Gonzalo Vanegas
- 1996: Gonzalo Vanegas
- 1997: Diego Grisales
- 1998: Emigdio Delgado (VEN)
- 1999: William Peña
- 2000: Diego Grisales
- 2001: Richard Rosero
- 2002: Richard Rosero
- 2003: John Vargas
- 2004: Julio Pulido
- 2005: Wilder Álvarez
- 2006: Wilder Álvarez

=== 110 metres hurdles ===
- 1991: José Humberto Rivas
- 1992: ?
- 1993: Julian González
- 1994: José Humberto Rivas
- 1995: José Humberto Rivas
- 1996: Julian González
- 1997: José Humberto Rivas
- 1998: José Humberto Rivas
- 1999: Paulo Villar
- 2000: Paulo Villar
- 2001: Paulo Villar
- 2002: Heiner Rovira
- 2003: Paulo Villar
- 2004: Paulo Villar
- 2005: Paulo Villar
- 2006: Paulo Villar

=== 400 metres hurdles ===
- 1991: Leonel Pedroza
- 1992: ?
- 1993: Llimy Rivas
- 1994: Llimy Rivas
- 1995: Llimy Rivas
- 1996: Llimy Rivas
- 1997: Llimy Rivas
- 1998: Alexander Mena
- 1999: Llimy Rivas
- 2000: Alexander Mena
- 2001: José Carvajal
- 2002: Llimy Rivas
- 2003: Alexander Mena
- 2004: Paulo Villar
- 2005: Oscar Candanoza
- 2006: Paulo Villar

=== High jump ===
- 1991: Gilmar Mayo
- 1992: Gilmar Mayo
- 1993: Gilmar Mayo
- 1994: Gilmar Mayo
- 1995: Gilmar Mayo
- 1996: Gilmar Mayo
- 1997: Gilmar Mayo
- 1998: Gilmar Mayo
- 1999: Gilmar Mayo
- 2000: Gilmar Mayo
- 2001: Gilmar Mayo
- 2002: Gilmar Mayo
- 2003: Gilmar Mayo
- 2004: Gilmar Mayo
- 2005: Gilmar Mayo
- 2006: Gilmar Mayo

=== Pole vault ===
- 1991: Norberto García
- 1992: Miguel Saldarriaga
- 1993: William Amador
- 1994: Juan Jaramillo
- 1995: ?
- 1996: Miguel Saldarriaga
- 1997: Miguel Saldarriaga
- 1998: Luis Hidalgo (VEN)
- 1999: Jackson Angulo
- 2000: Oscar Sánchez
- 2001: Jackson Angulo
- 2002: Oscar Romer
- 2003: David Rojas
- 2004: David Rojas
- 2005: Víctor Medina
- 2006: David Rojas

=== Long jump ===
- 1991: Lewis Asprilla
- 1992: Luis Lorduy
- 1993: Oscar Acosta
- 1994: Lewis Asprilla
- 1995: Lewis Asprilla
- 1996: Lewis Asprilla
- 1997: Lewis Asprilla
- 1998: Lewis Asprilla
- 1999: Lewis Asprilla
- 2000: Alvin Rentería
- 2001: Lewis Asprilla
- 2002: Lewis Asprilla
- 2003: Dainler Griego
- 2004: Marcos Ibargüen
- 2005: Lewis Asprilla
- 2006: Marcos Ibargüen

=== Triple jump ===
- 1991: Gilmar Mayo
- 1992: Gilmar Mayo
- 1993: Gilmar Mayo
- 1994: Gilmar Mayo
- 1995: Leisner Aragón
- 1996: Leisner Aragón
- 1997: Leisner Aragón
- 1998: Gilmar Mayo
- 1999: Alvin Rentería
- 2000: Leisner Aragón
- 2001: Alvin Rentería
- 2002: Alvin Rentería
- 2003: Leisner Aragón
- 2004: Alvin Rentería
- 2005: Carlos Carabalí
- 2006: Carlos Carabalí

=== Shot put ===
- 1991: Celso Aragón
- 1992: Celso Aragón
- 1993: Celso Aragón
- 1994: Orlando Ibarra
- 1995: Orlando Ibarra
- 1996: Orlando Ibarra
- 1997: Jhonny Rodríguez
- 1998: Orlando Ibarra
- 1999: Orlando Ibarra
- 2000: Orlando Ibarra
- 2001: Jhonny Rodríguez
- 2002: Orlando Ibarra
- 2003: Jhonny Rodríguez
- 2004: Geovanny García
- 2005: Jhonny Rodríguez
- 2006: Jhonny Rodríguez

=== Discus throw ===
- 1991: Luis Fernando Garrido
- 1992: Rogelio Ospino
- 1993: Rogelio Ospino
- 1994: Isaac Vallecilla
- 1995: Rogelio Ospino
- 1996: Rogelio Ospino
- 1997: ?
- 1998: Rogelio Ospino
- 1999: Julián Angulo
- 2000: Orlando Ibarra
- 2001: Orlando Ibarra
- 2002: Orlando Ibarra
- 2003: Julián Angulo
- 2004: Julián Angulo
- 2005: Jhonny Rodríguez
- 2006: Julián Angulo

=== Hammer throw ===
- 1991: David Castrillón
- 1992: David Castrillón
- 1993: Fredy Mendoza
- 1994: Fabián Vera
- 1995: Roberto Lozano
- 1996: David Castrillón
- 1997: David Castrillón
- 1998: David Castrillón
- 1999: Fabián Vera
- 2000: Fabián Vera
- 2001: Fabián Vera
- 2002: Fabián Vera
- 2003: Freimar Arias
- 2004: Freimar Arias
- 2005: Freimar Arias
- 2006: Freimar Arias

=== Javelin throw ===
- 1991: Luis Lucumí
- 1992: Luis Lucumí
- 1993: Luis Lucumí
- 1994: Luis Lucumí
- 1995: Luis Lucumí
- 1996: Luis Lucumí
- 1997: Luis Lucumí
- 1998: Luis Lucumí
- 1999: Luis Lucumí
- 2000: Noraldo Palacios
- 2001: Noraldo Palacios
- 2002: Noraldo Palacios
- 2003: Noraldo Palacios
- 2004: Noraldo Palacios
- 2005: Noraldo Palacios
- 2006: Noraldo Palacios

=== Decathlon ===
- 1991: Luis Banquero
- 1992: Arnold Chara
- 1993: ?
- 1994: Cecilio Escobar
- 1995: Cecilio Escobar
- 1996: Cecilio Escobar
- 1997: Luis Banquero
- 1998: Luis Banquero
- 1999: Leonel Gómez
- 2000: Jackson Angulo
- 2001: Jackson Angulo
- 2002: Jhon Urrutia
- 2003: Robinson Urrutia
- 2004: Andrés Mantilla
- 2005: José Gómez
- 2006: José Gómez

=== 20 kilometres walk ===
The competition was contested on a track in 1998, 2000, 2002, 2003 and 2005.

- 1991: Querubín Moreno
- 1992: Querubín Moreno
- 1993: Orlando Díaz
- 1994: Héctor Moreno
- 1995: Querubín Moreno
- 1996: Héctor Moreno
- 1997: Querubín Moreno
- 1998: Pedro Castro
- 1999: Orlando Díaz
- 2000: John Jairo García
- 2001: Fernando López
- 2002: Fernando López
- 2003: Fernando López
- 2004: Fernando López
- 2005: Fernando López
- 2006: James Rendón

=== 35 kilometres walk ===
The 1993 event was short at 30 km.

- 1993: Querubín Moreno
- 1994: Rodrigo Moreno
- 1995: Wilson Vargas

=== 50 kilometres walk ===
- 1991: Rodrigo Moreno
- 1992: Clodomiro Moreno
- 1993: Not held
- 1994: Not held
- 1995: Not held
- 1996: Fernando Roso
- 1997:?
- 1998:?
- 1999:?
- 2000: Joaquín Córdoba
- 2001:?
- 2002: Not held
- 2003:?
- 2004: Rodrigo Moreno
- 2005:?
- 2006:?

== Women ==
=== 100 metres ===
- 1991: Alejandra Quiñones
- 1992: Ximena Restrepo
- 1993: Patricia Rodríguez
- 1994: Mirtha Brock
- 1995: Zandra Borrero
- 1996: Mirtha Brock
- 1997: Felipa Palacios
- 1998: Mirtha Brock
- 1999: Mirtha Brock
- 2000: Digna Luz Murillo
- 2001: Mirtha Brock
- 2002: Norma González
- 2003: Melisa Murillo
- 2004: Melisa Murillo
- 2005: Yomara Hinestroza
- 2006: Felipa Palacios

=== 200 metres ===
- 1991: Ximena Restrepo
- 1992: Ximena Restrepo
- 1993: Patricia Rodríguez
- 1994: Patricia Rodríguez
- 1995: Patricia Rodríguez
- 1996: Patricia Rodríguez
- 1997: Felipa Palacios
- 1998: Mirtha Brock
- 1999: Felipa Palacios
- 2000: Felipa Palacios
- 2001: Miriam Caicedo
- 2002: Norma González
- 2003: Digna Luz Murillo
- 2004: Norma González
- 2005: Darlenys Obregón
- 2006: Darlenys Obregón

=== 400 metres ===
- 1991: Ximena Restrepo
- 1992: Norfalia Carabalí
- 1993: Janeth Lucumí
- 1994: Flor Robledo
- 1995: Patricia Rodríguez
- 1996: Norfalia Carabalí
- 1997: Norfalia Carabalí
- 1998: Norfalia Carabalí
- 1999: Patricia Rodríguez
- 2000: Norma González
- 2001: Norma González
- 2002: Mirtha Brock
- 2003: Rosibel García
- 2004: Norma González
- 2005: Norma González
- 2006: Norma González

=== 800 metres ===
- 1991: Amparo Alba
- 1992: Martha Gómez
- 1993: Martha Gómez
- 1994: Flor Robledo
- 1995: Norfalia Carabalí
- 1996: Norfalia Carabalí
- 1997: Norfalia Carabalí
- 1998: Janeth Lucumí
- 1999: Janeth Lucumí
- 2000: Janeth Lucumí
- 2001: Rosibel García
- 2002: Rosibel García
- 2003: Rosibel García
- 2004: Rosibel García
- 2005: Rosibel García
- 2006: Rosibel García

=== 1500 metres ===
- 1991: Amparo Alba
- 1992: Amparo Alba
- 1993: Rocío Estrada
- 1994: Julieth Mendoza
- 1995: Bertha Sánchez
- 1996: Bertha Sánchez
- 1997: Rosa Mila Ibarra
- 1998: Bertha Sánchez
- 1999: Bertha Sánchez
- 2000: Sandra Villa
- 2001: Bertha Sánchez
- 2002: Bertha Sánchez
- 2003: Bertha Sánchez
- 2004: Rosibel García
- 2005: Rosibel García
- 2006: Rosibel García

=== 3000 metres ===
- 1991: Rosa Mila Ibarra
- 1992: Stella Castro
- 1993: Stella Castro
- 1994: Iglandini González

=== 5000 metres ===
- 1995: Bertha Sánchez
- 1996: Stella Castro
- 1997: Bertha Sánchez
- 1998: Bertha Sánchez
- 1999: Bertha Sánchez
- 2000: Stella Castro
- 2001: Bertha Sánchez
- 2002: Bertha Sánchez
- 2003: Bertha Sánchez
- 2004: Bertha Sánchez
- 2005: Bertha Sánchez
- 2006: Ana Joaquina Rondor

=== 10,000 metres ===
- 1991: Esneda Londoño
- 1992:?
- 1993: Stella Castro
- 1994: Stella Castro
- 1995: Esneda Londoño
- 1996: Stella Castro
- 1997: Stella Castro
- 1998: Iglandini González
- 1999: Stella Castro
- 2000: Stella Castro
- 2001: Iglandini González
- 2002: Bertha Sánchez
- 2003: Bertha Sánchez
- 2004: Rosalba García
- 2005: Bertha Sánchez
- 2006: Bertha Sánchez

=== Half marathon ===
- 2005: Bertha Sánchez

=== Marathon ===
- 1991: ?
- 1992: Teresa Allende
- 1993: ?
- 1994: ?
- 1995: ?
- 1996: ?
- 1997: ?
- 1998: ?
- 1999: ?
- 2000: Sandra León
- 2001: ?
- 2002: Rosalba García
- 2003: ?
- 2004: Claudia Tangarife

=== 3000 metres steeplechase ===
- 2001: Bertha Sánchez
- 2002: Yolanda Caballero
- 2003: Diana Alzate
- 2004: María Guerrero
- 2005: Ángela Figueroa
- 2006: Bertha Sánchez

=== 100 metres hurdles ===
- 1991: Zorobabelia Córdoba
- 1992: Zorobabelia Córdoba
- 1993: Martha Dinas
- 1994: Martha Dinas
- 1995: Martha Dinas
- 1996: Martha Dinas
- 1997: Princesa Oliveros
- 1998: Alejandra Quiñones
- 1999: Princesa Oliveros
- 2000: Princesa Oliveros
- 2001: Brigitte Merlano
- 2002: Princesa Oliveros
- 2003: Princesa Oliveros
- 2004: Princesa Oliveros
- 2005: Brigitte Merlano
- 2006: Princesa Oliveros

=== 400 metres hurdles ===
- 1991: Maribelsy Peña
- 1992: Maribelsy Peña
- 1993: ?
- 1994: Flor Robledo
- 1995: Maribelsy Peña
- 1996: ?
- 1997: Flor Robledo
- 1998: Flor Robledo
- 1999: Princesa Oliveros
- 2000: Princesa Oliveros
- 2001: Rosibel García
- 2002: Princesa Oliveros
- 2003: Princesa Oliveros
- 2004: Princesa Oliveros
- 2005: Dinelba Hinestroza
- 2006: Princesa Oliveros

=== High jump ===
- 1991: Nadia Katich
- 1992: Janeth Lagoyete
- 1993: Janeth Lagoyete
- 1994: Fernanda Mosquera
- 1995: Fernanda Mosquera
- 1996: Janeth Lagoyete
- 1997: Janeth Lagoyete
- 1998: Zorobabelia Córdoba
- 1999: Caterine Ibargüen
- 2000: Lida Torres
- 2001: Caterine Ibargüen
- 2002: Caterine Ibargüen
- 2003: Caterine Ibargüen
- 2004: Caterine Ibargüen
- 2005: Caterine Ibargüen
- 2006: Caterine Ibargüen

=== Pole vault ===
- 1997: Carolina de la Cuesta
- 1998: Yoisemil Fuentes (VEN)
- 1999: Carolina de la Cuesta
- 2000: Milena Agudelo
- 2001: Milena Agudelo
- 2002: Milena Agudelo
- 2003: Milena Agudelo
- 2004: Milena Agudelo
- 2005: Karina Quejada
- 2006: Milena Agudelo

=== Long jump ===
- 1991: Zorobabelia Córdoba
- 1992: Betty Ambuila
- 1993: Zorobabelia Córdoba
- 1994: Helena Guerrero
- 1995: Helena Guerrero
- 1996: Alejandra Quiñones
- 1997: Alejandra Quiñones
- 1998: Yorly Lasso
- 1999: Clara Córdoba
- 2000: Helena Guerrero
- 2001: Helena Guerrero
- 2002: Helena Guerrero
- 2003: Caterine Ibargüen
- 2004: Caterine Ibargüen
- 2005: Helena Guerrero
- 2006: Caterine Ibargüen

=== Triple jump ===
- 1992: Milly Figueroa
- 1993: ?
- 1994: Milly Figueroa
- 1995: Milly Figueroa
- 1996: Clara Córdoba
- 1997: Clara Córdoba
- 1998: Sorileny Quintero (VEN)
- 1999: Clara Córdoba
- 2000: Clara Córdoba
- 2001: Ivonne Patarroyo
- 2002: Caterine Ibargüen
- 2003: Caterine Ibargüen
- 2004: Caterine Ibargüen
- 2005: Caterine Ibargüen
- 2006: Johanna Triviño

=== Shot put ===
- 1991: María Isabel Urrutia
- 1992: María Isabel Urrutia
- 1993: María Isabel Urrutia
- 1994: María Isabel Urrutia
- 1995: María Isabel Urrutia
- 1996: María Isabel Urrutia
- 1997: María Isabel Urrutia
- 1998: María Isabel Urrutia
- 1999: María Isabel Urrutia
- 2000: Luz Dary Castro
- 2001: Luz Dary Castro
- 2002: Luz Dary Castro
- 2003: Luz Dary Castro
- 2004: Leidy Arboleda
- 2005: Luz Dary Castro
- 2006: Luz Dary Castro

=== Discus throw ===
- 1991: María Isabel Urrutia
- 1992: María Isabel Urrutia
- 1993: María Isabel Urrutia
- 1994: María Isabel Urrutia
- 1995: María Isabel Urrutia
- 1996: María Isabel Urrutia
- 1997: María Isabel Urrutia
- 1998: María Isabel Urrutia
- 1999: Denis Córdoba
- 2000: Luz Dary Castro
- 2001: Luz Dary Castro
- 2002: Luz Dary Castro
- 2003: Luz Dary Castro
- 2004: Arelis Quiñones
- 2005: Luz Dary Castro
- 2006: Luz Dary Castro

=== Hammer throw ===
- 1993: María Eugenia Villamizar
- 1994: María Eugenia Villamizar
- 1995: María Eugenia Villamizar
- 1996: María Eugenia Villamizar
- 1997: María Eugenia Villamizar
- 1998: María Eugenia Villamizar
- 1999: María Eugenia Villamizar
- 2000: María Eugenia Villamizar
- 2001: María Eugenia Villamizar
- 2002: María Eugenia Villamizar
- 2003: Yaiza Córdoba
- 2004: Johana Ramírez
- 2005: Johana Ramírez
- 2006: Johana Moreno

=== Javelin throw ===
- 1991: Verónica Prieto
- 1992: Zorobabelia Córdoba
- 1993: Berta Gómez
- 1994: Zuleima Araméndiz
- 1995: Zuleima Araméndiz
- 1996: Zuleima Araméndiz
- 1997: Zuleima Araméndiz
- 1998: Sabina Moya
- 1999: Zuleima Araméndiz
- 2000: Zuleima Araméndiz
- 2001: Zuleima Araméndiz
- 2002: Zuleima Araméndiz
- 2003: Sabina Moya
- 2004: Zuleima Araméndiz
- 2005: Tatiana Valencia
- 2006: Zuleima Araméndiz

=== Heptathlon ===
- 1991:?
- 1992: Milly Figueroa
- 1993: ?
- 1994:?
- 1995: Judith Rivas
- 1996: Zorobabelia Córdoba
- 1997:?
- 1998: Zorobabelia Córdoba
- 1999: Flor Robledo
- 2000: Zorobabelia Córdoba
- 2001: Zorobabelia Córdoba
- 2002: Nasly Perea
- 2003: Yolanda Mina
- 2004: Nasly Perea
- 2005: Nasly Perea
- 2006: Nasly Perea

=== 10 kilometres walk ===
- 1991: Gloria Moreno
- 1992: Gloria Moreno
- 1993: Liliana Bermeo
- 1994: Cristina Bohórquez
- 1995: Liliana Bermeo
- 1996: Liliana Bermeo
- 1997: Liliana Bermeo
- 1998: Sandra Zapata

=== 20 kilometres walk ===
The 2000, 2002 and 2003 events were contested on a track.

- 1999: Cristina Bohórquez
- 2000: Cristina Bohórquez
- 2001: Cristina Bohórquez
- 2002: Sandra Zapata
- 2003: Sandra Zapata
- 2004: Sandra Zapata
- 2005: Sandra Zapata
- 2006: Sandra Zapata
