= 1999 South American Championships in Athletics – Results =

These are the full results of the 1999 South American Championships in Athletics which took place on June 25–27, 1999, in Bogotá, Colombia on Coliseo El Salitre. As the stadium is located 2600 meters above sea level, performances in some of the events were aided by high altitude.

== Men's results ==
=== 100 meters ===
Heats – June 25
Wind:
Heat 1: +0.4 m/s, Heat 2: 0.0 m/s

Rank	Heat	Name	Nationality	Time	Notes
1	2	Claudinei da Silva	Brazil	10.15	Q
2	1	André da Silva	Brazil	10.16	Q
3	2	Ricardo Roach	Chile	10.25	Q
4	2	Heber Viera	Uruguay	10.27	Q, NR
5	1	Sebastián Keitel	Chile	10.37	Q
6	1	Iván Altamirano	Argentina	10.53	Q
7	2	Gabriel Simón	Argentina	10.55	q
8	1	Rubén Techeira	Uruguay	10.59	q
9	2	José Carabalí	Venezuela	10.77	
10	2	Cristian Gutiérrez	Ecuador	10.78	
11	2	Jimmy Pino	Colombia	10.81	
12	1	John Córdoba	Colombia	10.82	
13	1	Fabricio Lara	Ecuador	11.04	

Final – June 25
Wind:
+0.9 m/s

Rank	Name	Nationality	Time	Notes
1st place, gold medalist(s)	André da Silva	Brazil	10.06	CR
2nd place, silver medalist(s)	Sebastián Keitel	Chile	10.13	
3rd place, bronze medalist(s)	Heber Viera	Uruguay	10.15	NR
4	Ricardo Roach	Chile	10.21	PB
5	Gabriel Simón	Argentina	10.23	=NR
6	Iván Altamirano	Argentina	10.52	
7	Rubén Techeira	Uruguay	10.59	
	Claudinei da Silva	Brazil	DNF	

Extra – June 25
Wind: -0.6 m/s

Rank	Name	Nationality	Time	Notes
1	Édson Ribeiro	Brazil	10.26	
2	Raphael de Oliveira	Brazil	10.37	
3	Juan Pablo Faúndez	Chile	10.60	
4	Fabián Aguilera	Chile	10.94	

=== 200 meters ===
Heats – June 26
Wind:
Heat 1: +3.6 m/s, Heat 2: +3.3 m/s

Rank	Heat	Name	Nationality	Time	Notes
1	1	Édson Ribeiro	Brazil	20.56	Q
2	2	André da Silva	Brazil	20.59	Q
3	2	Ricardo Roach	Chile	20.84	Q
4	1	Heber Viera	Uruguay	21.01	Q
5	1	John Córdoba	Colombia	21.15	Q
6	2	Damián Spector	Argentina	21.19	Q
7	2	Rubén Techeira	Uruguay	21.33	q
8	1	Iván Altamirano	Argentina	21.39	q
9	2	Cristian Gutiérrez	Ecuador	21.47	
10	2	José Carabalí	Venezuela	21.72	
11	1	Dick Perlaza	Ecuador	21.75	

Final – June 26
Wind:
+2.5 m/s

Rank	Name	Nationality	Time	Notes
1st place, gold medalist(s)	Édson Ribeiro	Brazil	20.54	
2nd place, silver medalist(s)	Ricardo Roach	Chile	20.59	
3rd place, bronze medalist(s)	Heber Viera	Uruguay	20.76	
4	Damián Spector	Argentina	21.17	
5	Rubén Techeira	Uruguay	21.28	
6	John Córdoba	Colombia	21.58	
	André da Silva	Brazil	DQ	
	Iván Altamirano	Argentina	DQ	

=== 400 meters ===
June 25

Rank	Name	Nationality	Time	Notes
1st place, gold medalist(s)	Anderson Jorge dos Santos	Brazil	45.39	
2nd place, silver medalist(s)	John Mena	Colombia	46.16	
3rd place, bronze medalist(s)	Inácio Leão Filho	Brazil	46.18	
4	William Hernández	Venezuela	46.82	
5	Julio César Rojas	Colombia	46.84	
6	Jonathan Palma	Venezuela	47.78	
7	Dick Perlaza	Ecuador	47.97	
8	Xavier Caicedo	Ecuador	50.53	

=== 800 meters ===
June 27

Rank	Name	Nationality	Time	Notes
1st place, gold medalist(s)	Hudson de Souza	Brazil	1:49.82	
2nd place, silver medalist(s)	Flávio Godoy	Brazil	1:50.00	
3rd place, bronze medalist(s)	José Luis Hincapié	Colombia	1:51.11	
4	Gustavo Aguirre	Argentina	1:51.21	
5	Fleider Heredia	Colombia	1:52.80	
6	Danielo Estefano	Uruguay	1:54.03	
7	Leonardo Vázquez	Uruguay	1:56.64	

=== 1500 meters ===
June 26

Rank	Name	Nationality	Time	Notes
1st place, gold medalist(s)	Mauricio Ladino	Colombia	3:49.95	
2nd place, silver medalist(s)	Marcio Ribeiro da Silva	Brazil	3:51.38	
3rd place, bronze medalist(s)	Alonso Pérez	Colombia	3:51.51	
4	Pablo Ramírez	Ecuador	3:52.20	
5	Celso Ficagna	Brazil	3:55.74	
6	Danilo Quinatoa	Ecuador	4:03.52	
7	Cristián Rosales	Uruguay	4:07.21	

=== 5000 meters ===
June 27

Rank	Name	Nationality	Time	Notes
1st place, gold medalist(s)	Silvio Guerra	Ecuador	14:20.35	
2nd place, silver medalist(s)	Franklin Tenorio	Ecuador	14:34.21	
3rd place, bronze medalist(s)	Valdenor dos Santos	Brazil	14:37.75	
4	Mauricio Ladino	Colombia	14:39.94	
5	Elenilson da Silva	Brazil	14:55.78	
6	Jacinto López	Colombia	14:58.31	
7	Vicente Chura	Peru	15:03.57	

=== 10,000 meters ===
June 25

Rank	Name	Nationality	Time	Notes
1st place, gold medalist(s)	Silvio Guerra	Ecuador	30:30.20	
2nd place, silver medalist(s)	Vicente Chura	Peru	30:55.24	
3rd place, bronze medalist(s)	Franklin Tenorio	Ecuador	30:57.12	
4	William Roldán	Colombia	31:05.14	
5	Adalberto Garcia	Brazil	31:32.68	
	Osmiro Silva	Brazil	DNF	
	Herder Vásquez	Colombia	DNF	
	Julio Cutipa	Peru	DNF	
	Pedro Rojas	Colombia	DNF	
	João N'Tyamba	Angola	DNF	

=== 110 meters hurdles ===
June 25
Wind: +1.9 m/s

Rank	Name	Nationality	Time	Notes
1st place, gold medalist(s)	Luiz André Balcers	Brazil	13.76	CR
2nd place, silver medalist(s)	Paulo Villar	Colombia	14.31	
3rd place, bronze medalist(s)	Márcio de Souza	Brazil	14.37	
4	Carlos Correa	Chile	14.66	
5	Jackson Quiñónez	Ecuador	14.67	
6	Carlos Vega	Chile	14.81	
7	Omar Triviño	Ecuador	15.45	
	José Rivas	Colombia	DNF	

=== 400 meters hurdles ===
June 26

Rank	Name	Nationality	Time	Notes
1st place, gold medalist(s)	Eronilde de Araújo	Brazil	49.13	
2nd place, silver medalist(s)	Cleverson da Silva	Brazil	49.50	
3rd place, bronze medalist(s)	Llimy Rivas	Colombia	50.41	
4	Carlos Zbinden	Chile	51.06	
5	Alexander Mena	Colombia	51.50	
6	Xavier Caicedo	Ecuador	53.58	
	Curt Young	Panama	DNF	

=== 3000 meters steeplechase ===
June 27

Rank	Name	Nationality	Time	Notes
1st place, gold medalist(s)	Pablo Ramírez	Ecuador	9:11.21	
2nd place, silver medalist(s)	Giovanni Morejón	Bolivia	9:16.10	
3rd place, bronze medalist(s)	Diego Grisales	Colombia	9:19.79	
4	William Peña	Colombia	9:28.58	
5	Thiago de Oliveira	Brazil	9:59.92	
6	Celso Ficagna	Brazil	9:59.92	

=== 4 x 100 meters relay ===
June 26

Rank	Nation	Competitors	Time	Notes
1st place, gold medalist(s)	Brazil	Raphael de Oliveira, Claudinei da Silva, Édson Ribeiro, André da Silva	38.46	CR
2nd place, silver medalist(s)	Argentina	Iván Altamirano, Gabriel Simón, Guillermo Cacián, Carlos Gats	39.96	
3rd place, bronze medalist(s)	Chile	Ricardo Roach, Fabián Aguilera, Rodrigo Roach, Juan Pablo Faúndez	39.98	
4	Uruguay	Heber Viera, Rubén Techeira, Danielo Estefan, Daniel Sarmiento	40.14	NR
5	Colombia	Jimmy Pino, John Córdoba, John Mena, Llimy Rivas	40.22	
6	Ecuador	Cristian Gutiérrez, Dick Perlaza, Fabricio Lara, Jackson Quiñónez	41.00	

=== 4 x 400 meters relay ===
June 27

Rank	Nation	Competitors	Time	Notes
1st place, gold medalist(s)	Brazil	Eronilde de Araújo, Anderson Jorge dos Santos, Inácio Leão Filho, Cleverson da Silva	3:02.09	CR
2nd place, silver medalist(s)	Colombia	John Mena, Llimy Rivas, Alexander Mena, Julio César Rojas	3:04.52	NR
3rd place, bronze medalist(s)	Argentina	Gustavo Aguirre, Carlos Gats, Guillermo Cacián, Damián Spector	3:08.53	NR
4	Venezuela	William Hernández, Telvis Torres, Danny Nuñez, Jonathan Palma	3:11.22	
5	Ecuador	Cristian Gutiérrez, Dick Perlaza, Xavier Caicedo, Jackson Quiñónez	3:13.52	

=== 20,000 meters walk ===
June 26

Rank	Name	Nationality	Time	Notes
1st place, gold medalist(s)	Sérgio Galdino	Brazil	1:31:01.68	
2nd place, silver medalist(s)	Nixon Zambrano	Colombia	1:32:49.76	
3rd place, bronze medalist(s)	Mário dos Santos	Brazil	1:33:50.59	
	Orlando Díaz	Colombia	DNF	
	Xavier Moreno	Ecuador	DNF	

=== High jump ===
June 26

Rank	Name	Nationality	2.05	2.10	2.15	2.18	2.21	2.24	2.26	2.28	Result	Notes
1st place, gold medalist(s)	Fabrício Romero	Brazil	o	o	o	o	xo	o	o	xxx	2.26	=CR, NR
2nd place, silver medalist(s)	Gilmar Mayo	Colombia	–	–	o	o	xxo	xxo	o	xxx	2.26	=CR
3rd place, bronze medalist(s)	Erasmo Jara	Argentina	o	o	o	o	xxo	xxx			2.21	
4	Felipe Apablaza	Chile									2.15	
5	Jessé de Lima	Brazil									2.15	
5	Franco Moy	Peru									2.15	
7	Jackson Quiñónez	Ecuador									2.05	
8	José Barahona	Panama									2.05	
9	José Cáceres	Peru									2.05	

=== Pole vault ===
June 27

Rank	Name	Nationality	4.60	4.70	4.80	4.90	5.00	5.20	5.35	Result	Notes
1st place, gold medalist(s)	Ricardo Diez	Venezuela	–	–	–	–	o	o	xxx	5.20	
2nd place, silver medalist(s)	Javier Benítez	Argentina								5.00	
3rd place, bronze medalist(s)	Cristián Aspillaga	Chile								5.00	
4	Henrique Martins	Brazil								4.90	
5	Oscar Veit	Argentina								4.80	
6	Francisco León	Peru								4.70	
7	Jorge Naranjo	Chile								4.70	
8	Sebastián Ortiz	Uruguay								4.60	
	Gustavo Rehder	Brazil								NM	
	Luis Hidalgo	Venezuela								NM	

=== Long jump ===
June 25

Rank	Name	Nationality	#1	#2	#3	#4	#5	#6	Result	Notes
1st place, gold medalist(s)	Lewis Asprilla	Colombia	x	x	7.94	x	x	7.96	7.96	NR
2nd place, silver medalist(s)	Cláudio Novaes	Brazil	x	7.78	x	x	7.69	x	7.78	
3rd place, bronze medalist(s)	Sérgio dos Santos	Brazil	x	7.52	7.47w	7.77	x	6.53	7.77	
4	José Joaquín Reyes	Venezuela	7.24w	7.20	7.76	7.58w	x	7.44	7.76	
5	Gastón González	Venezuela	x	7.45w	7.39	7.36	7.42w	7.63	7.63	
6	Carlos Atencio	Peru	7.31	7.38	7.39	–	–	7.31	7.39	
7	Wílmer Cortez	Ecuador	7.21	7.10w	7.28w	7.27	7.29	7.16	7.29	
8	Alvin Rentería	Colombia	x	7.11	x	x	7.23w	–	7.23w	

=== Triple jump ===
June 26

Rank	Name	Nationality	#1	#2	#3	#4	#5	#6	Result	Notes
1st place, gold medalist(s)	Anísio Silva	Brazil	14.60w	16.48	x	14.53	x	x	16.48	
2nd place, silver medalist(s)	Johnny Rodríguez	Venezuela	15.67	16.10	16.13w	16.45w	w	16.41	16.45w	
3rd place, bronze medalist(s)	Sérgio Muniz dos Santos	Brazil	15.77w	16.15	16.03	16.20	16.20	x	16.20	
4	Leigner Aragón	Colombia	15.41w	15.92	15.74	15.86	15.45	15.54w	15.92	
5	Alvin Rentería	Colombia	x	15.71	x	15.14w	–	13.56	15.71	
6	Carlos Atencio	Peru	15.28	15.36	15.58	15.45w	14.80	15.42	15.58	
7	Wílmer Cortez	Ecuador	14.82	15.37	15.24	15.27	x	15.20	15.37	
8	Freddy Nieves	Ecuador	14.59	15.18	15.15	15.13	14.98w	x	15.18	
9	Julio Solarte	Venezuela							15.08	
10	Feliipe Apablaza	Chile							14.77	

=== Shot put ===
June 25

Rank	Name	Nationality	#1	#2	#3	#4	#5	#6	Result	Notes
1st place, gold medalist(s)	Édson Miguel	Brazil	17.21	17.40	17.80	17.73	17.61	17.86	17.86	
2nd place, silver medalist(s)	Marco Antonio Verni	Chile	16.59	17.83	x	x	17.01	17.83	17.83	
3rd place, bronze medalist(s)	Jhonny Rodríguez	Colombia	16.60	16.94	16.97	16.93	x	x	16.97	
4	Orlando Ibarra	Colombia	x	16.86	16.52	16.62	16.65	16.94	16.94	
5	Juan Tello	Peru	15.17	x	x	16.06	16.72	x	16.72	

=== Discus throw ===
June 26

Rank	Name	Nationality	#1	#2	#3	#4	#5	#6	Result	Notes
1st place, gold medalist(s)	Marcelo Pugliese	Argentina	51.60	58.93	56.15	59.23	58.32	57.83	59.23	
2nd place, silver medalist(s)	Julio Piñero	Argentina	52.64	56.50	56.44	57.37	x	57.92	57.92	
3rd place, bronze medalist(s)	João Joaquim dos Santos	Brazil	55.82	51.96	x	53.19	51.92	54.03	55.82	
4	Celso Gomes	Brazil	53.60	52.67	53.92	x	50.30	54.10	54.10	
5	Julián Angulo	Colombia	52.58	x	x	53.62	x	x	53.62	
6	Juan Tello	Peru	51.90	50.98	53.00	53.33	x	52.46	53.33	
7	Andrés Solo de Zaldívar	Chile	51.72	53.15	x	52.77	51.16	x	53.15	
8	Rogelio Ospino	Colombia	x	x	49.55	x	x	48.53	49.55	

=== Hammer throw ===
June 27

Rank	Name	Nationality	#1	#2	#3	#4	#5	#6	Result	Notes
1st place, gold medalist(s)	Juan Ignacio Cerra	Argentina	70.97	68.18	67.29	70.57	72.09	–	72.09	CR
2nd place, silver medalist(s)	Eduardo Acuña	Peru	63.40	64.52	61.49	x	62.65	61.98	64.52	
3rd place, bronze medalist(s)	Adrián Marzo	Argentina	64.09	x	x	x	60.06	x	64.09	
4	Aldo Bello	Venezuela	63.10	63.19	61.90	62.27	62.15	x	63.19	
5	Mário Leme	Brazil	60.25	58.47	60.99	x	58.03	x	60.99	
6	Leonardo Pino	Chile	x	52.44	x	53.79	56.66	57.82	57.82	
7	Fabián Vera	Colombia	52.12	54.46	54.19	53.97	x	53.29	54.46	
8	Altamiro Severino	Brazil	x	51.27	48.64	52.83	51.79	52.28	52.83	
9	Carlos Murúa	Peru	x	45.06	x				45.06	

=== Javelin throw ===
June 27

Rank	Name	Nationality	#1	#2	#3	#4	#5	#6	Result	Notes
1st place, gold medalist(s)	Nery Kennedy	Paraguay	78.89	77.52	71.43	–	–	71.88	78.89	CR
2nd place, silver medalist(s)	Luis Lucumí	Colombia	73.43	73.58	x	72.50	72.15	x	73.58	
3rd place, bronze medalist(s)	Luiz Fernando da Silva	Brazil	x	x	73.57	71.23	x	x	73.57	
4	Luis Palomeque	Colombia	65.18	70.35	65.72	x	73.10	x	73.10	
5	Diego Moraga	Chile	x	67.67	64.75	63.57	x	69.56	69.56	
6	Jorge Quiñonez	Peru	63.00	65.50	63.97	67.29	61.56	68.29	68.29	
7	Volmir Casagrande Zilli	Brazil	63.88	67.10	65.95	63.30	67.02	63.99	67.10	
8	Edwin Cuesta	Venezuela	65.58	–	–	–	–	–	65.58	
9	Manuel Fuenmayor	Venezuela	65.19	x	x				65.19	

=== Decathlon ===
June 25–26

The highest mark recorded in each event is highlighted in yellow

Rank	Athlete	Nationality	100m	LJ	SP	HJ	400m	110m H	DT	PV	JT	1500m	Points	Notes
1st place, gold medalist(s)	Santiago Lorenzo	Argentina	11.27	7.50	12.21	1.83	49.15	15.60	41.56	4.50	60.21	4:50.41	7344	
2nd place, silver medalist(s)	Edson Bindilatti	Brazil	11.06	7.55	10.83	2.04	48.30	14.88	33.21	4.50	40.80	5:06.05	7196	
3rd place, bronze medalist(s)	Diógenes Estévez	Venezuela	11.28	7.12	13.57	1.92	51.39	15.36	39.64	4.40	45.37	4:54.20	7135	
4	Enrique Aguirre	Argentina	11.22	7.06	11.94	2.10	50.06	15.04	34.23	4.20	42.67	5:03.15	7040	
5	Edemar dos Santos	Brazil	11.77	6.90	11.53	1.83	50.12	15.66	36.52	3.60	52.73	4:33.24	6755	
6	Leonel Gómez	Colombia	11.66	6.49	9.84	1.80	51.80	16.39	31.07	3.10	42.46	4:29.02	5909	

== Women's results ==
=== 100 meters ===
Heats – June 25
Wind:
Heat 1: -0.7 m/s, Heat 2: +1.3 m/s

Rank	Heat	Name	Nationality	Time	Notes
1	2	Lucimar de Moura	Brazil	11.17	Q, CR, AR
2	2	Mirtha Brock	Colombia	11.44	Q
3	1	Kátia Regina Santos	Brazil	11.66	Q
4	1	Sandra Borrero	Colombia	11.81	Q
5	1	Lisette Rondón	Chile	11.82	Q
6	2	Vanesa Wohlgemuth	Argentina	11.84	Q
7	2	Daniela Pávez	Chile	11.92	q
8	2	Marcela Tiscornia	Uruguay	12.13	q
9	1	Emy Ochoa	Venezuela	12.13	

Final – June 25
Wind:
+0.3 m/s

Rank	Name	Nationality	Time	Notes
1st place, gold medalist(s)	Lucimar de Moura	Brazil	11.17	=CR, =AR
2nd place, silver medalist(s)	Mirtha Brock	Colombia	11.44	
3rd place, bronze medalist(s)	Kátia Regina Santos	Brazil	11.59	
4	Sandra Borrero	Colombia	11.70	
5	Lisette Rondón	Chile	11.71	
6	Vanesa Wohlgemuth	Argentina	11.77	
7	Marcela Tiscornia	Uruguay	11.982	
8	Daniela Pávez	Chile	11.92	

Extra – June 25
Wind: +2.3 m/s

Rank	Name	Nationality	Time	Notes
1	Cleide Amaral	Brazil	11.54	
2	Lorena de Oliveira	Brazil	11.65	
3	Sandra Reátegui	Peru	12.07	

=== 200 meters ===
June 26
Wind: +1.6 m/s

Rank	Name	Nationality	Time	Notes
1st place, gold medalist(s)	Lucimar de Moura	Brazil	22.60	CR, AR
2nd place, silver medalist(s)	Felipa Palacios	Colombia	22.97	
3rd place, bronze medalist(s)	Cleide Amaral	Brazil	23.74	
4	Vanesa Wohlgemuth	Argentina	24.12	
5	Lisette Rondón	Chile	24.12	
6	Sandra Reátegui	Peru	24.15	NJR
7	Marcela Tiscornia	Uruguay	24.40	

=== 400 meters ===
June 25

Rank	Name	Nationality	Time	Notes
1st place, gold medalist(s)	Norfalia Carabalí	Colombia	52.92	
2nd place, silver medalist(s)	Ana Paula Pereira	Brazil	53.56	
3rd place, bronze medalist(s)	Lorena de Oliveira	Brazil	54.73	
4	Sandra Reátegui	Peru	56.33	
5	Eliana Pacheco	Venezuela	56.42	
6	Fanny Sevilla	Venezuela	56.69	
7	Maritza Valencia	Ecuador	57.96	
8	Zulay Nazareno	Ecuador	59.66	

=== 800 meters ===
June 27

Rank	Name	Nationality	Time	Notes
1st place, gold medalist(s)	Luciana Mendes	Brazil	2:05.62	
2nd place, silver medalist(s)	Janeth Lucumí	Colombia	2:06.51	
3rd place, bronze medalist(s)	Marlene da Silva	Brazil	2:08.70	
4	Mercy Colorado	Ecuador	2:09.05	
5	Mariela Álvarez	Peru	2:12.79	
6	Silvia Malgor	Uruguay	2:12.92	
7	Elena Guerra	Uruguay	2:13.66	

=== 1500 meters ===
June 26

Rank	Name	Nationality	Time	Notes
1st place, gold medalist(s)	Bertha Sánchez	Colombia	4:35.72	
2nd place, silver medalist(s)	Fabiana Cristine da Silva	Brazil	4:37.68	
3rd place, bronze medalist(s)	Célia Regina dos Santos	Brazil	4:41.73	
4	Elena Guerra	Uruguay	4:47.39	
5	Érika Olivera	Chile	4:49.25	
6	Tania Poma	Bolivia	4:54.21	
7	Silvia Malgor	Uruguay	4:54.24	
8	Denna Dey-Evans	Panama	5:01.99	

=== 5000 meters ===
June 27

Rank	Name	Nationality	Time	Notes
1st place, gold medalist(s)	Stella Castro	Colombia	16:45.63	
2nd place, silver medalist(s)	Bertha Sánchez	Colombia	17:02.89	
3rd place, bronze medalist(s)	Érika Olivera	Chile	17:15.17	
4	Raquel Aceituno	Peru	17:23.16	
5	Fabiana Cristine da Silva	Brazil	17:34.15	
6	Tania Poma	Bolivia	17:37.11	
7	María Paredes	Ecuador	17:42.04	
8	Maria Benardo	Brazil	18:04.40	
9	Wilma Guerra	Ecuador	18:09.25	
10	Paulina Mamani	Peru	18:16.46	
	Sonia Calizaya	Bolivia	DNF	

=== 10,000 meters ===
June 25

Rank	Name	Nationality	Time	Notes
1st place, gold medalist(s)	Stella Castro	Colombia	34:30.92	
2nd place, silver medalist(s)	Érika Olivera	Chile	34:45.70	
3rd place, bronze medalist(s)	Sonia Calizaya	Bolivia	36:17.45	
4	Miryam Pulido	Colombia	36:20.43	
5	María Paredes	Ecuador	36:57.69	
6	Wilma Guerra	Ecuador	36:59.42	
7	Raquel Aceituno	Peru	37:06.81	
8	Nadir de Siqueira	Brazil	37:25.55	
9	Paulina Mamani	Peru	37:46.15	

=== 100 meters hurdles ===
Heats – June 25
Wind:
Heat 1: +1.1 m/s, Heat 2: +1.1 m/s

Rank	Heat	Name	Nationality	Time	Notes
1	1	Maurren Maggi	Brazil	13.07	Q, AR
2	2	Gilvaneide de Oliveira	Brazil	13.40	Q
3	1	Cora Olivero	Argentina	13.66	Q
4	2	Princesa Oliveros	Colombia	13.70	Q
5	2	Verónica Depaoli	Argentina	13.76	Q
6	1	Francisca Guzmán	Chile	14.12	Q
7	1	Sira Córdoba	Colombia	14.33	q
8	2	Velveth Moreno	Panama	15.09	q
9	1	Ondina Rodríguez	Ecuador	15.26	
10	2	Martha González	Ecuador	16.48	

Final – June 25
Wind:
+0.1 m/s

Rank	Name	Nationality	Time	Notes
1st place, gold medalist(s)	Maurren Maggi	Brazil	13.05	CR, AR
2nd place, silver medalist(s)	Verónica Depaoli	Argentina	13.45	=NR
3rd place, bronze medalist(s)	Princesa Oliveros	Colombia	13.49	NR
4	Cora Olivero	Argentina	13.54	
5	Sira Córdoba	Colombia	14.11	NJR
6	Francisca Guzmán	Chile	14.18	
7	Velveth Moreno	Panama	15.20	
	Gilvaneide de Oliveira	Brazil	DNF	

=== 400 meters hurdles ===
June 26

Rank	Name	Nationality	Time	Notes
1st place, gold medalist(s)	Ana Paula Pereira	Brazil	58.06	
2nd place, silver medalist(s)	Luciana França	Brazil	58.55	
3rd place, bronze medalist(s)	Princesa Oliveros	Colombia	58.77	
4	Verónica Depaoli	Argentina	59.93	
5	Cora Olivero	Argentina	1:01.16	
6	Martha González	Ecuador	1:02.60	
7	Ondina Rodríguez	Ecuador	1:03.83	
8	Sira Córdoba	Colombia	1:06.16	

=== 4 x 100 meters relay ===
June 26

Rank	Nation	Competitors	Time	Notes
1st place, gold medalist(s)	Colombia	Mirtha Brock, Felipa Palacios, Patricia Rodríguez, Norfalia Carabalí	44.12	CR
2nd place, silver medalist(s)	Ecuador	Martha González, Maritza Valencia, Zulay Nazareno, Ondina Rodríguez	48.13	
	Brazil		DNF	

=== 4 x 400 meters relay ===
June 27

Rank	Nation	Competitors	Time	Notes
1st place, gold medalist(s)	Colombia	Patricia Rodríguez, Norma González, Mirtha Brock, Norfalia Carabalí	3:32.74	
2nd place, silver medalist(s)	Brazil	Ana Paula Pereira, Lorena de Oliveira, Luciana Mendes, Luciana França	3:37.88	
3rd place, bronze medalist(s)	Ecuador	Martiza Valencia, Zulay Nazareno, Mercy Colorado, Ondina Rodríguez	3:49.05	
	Venezuela		DQ	

=== 20,000 meters walk ===
June 27

Rank	Name	Nationality	Time	Notes
1st place, gold medalist(s)	Miriam Ramón	Ecuador	1:39:27.0	CR, AR
2nd place, silver medalist(s)	Geovana Irusta	Bolivia	1:39:42.0	NR
3rd place, bronze medalist(s)	Cristina Bohórquez	Colombia	1:43:49.5	NR
4	Gianetti Bonfim	Brazil	1:46:59.4	
5	Sandra Zapata	Colombia	1:47:38.4	
6	Nailze Pereira	Brazil	1:55:35.3	
7	María Delgado	Chile	1:56:43.5	

=== High jump ===
June 26

Rank	Name	Nationality	1.60	1.70	1.73	1.76	1.81	1.83	1.87	Result	Notes
1st place, gold medalist(s)	Luciane Dambacher	Brazil	–	o	–	o	o	xo	xo	1.87	
2nd place, silver medalist(s)	Glaucia da Silva	Brazil								1.81	
3rd place, bronze medalist(s)	Caterine Ibargüen	Colombia								1.76	
4	Analía Santos	Argentina								1.73	
5	Paola Hoffman	Chile								1.70	
6	Ivonne Patarroyo	Colombia								1.60	
	Solange Witteveen	Argentina								NM	

=== Pole vault ===
June 25

Rank	Name	Nationality	3.30	3.40	3.70	3.75	4.00	4.10	4.20	4.30	Result	Notes
1st place, gold medalist(s)	Alejandra García	Argentina	–	–	–	–	o	o	xxo	xo	4.30	CR
2nd place, silver medalist(s)	Déborah Gyurcsek	Uruguay									3.75	
3rd place, bronze medalist(s)	Fabiana Murer	Brazil									3.70	
4	Karol Borja	Peru									3.40	
5	Elizabeth Restrepo	Colombia									3.40	NR
6	Carolina de la Cuesta	Colombia									3.30	

=== Long jump ===
June 26

Rank	Name	Nationality	#1	#2	#3	#4	#5	#6	Result	Notes
1st place, gold medalist(s)	Maurren Maggi	Brazil	7.26	x	6.90	x	–	x	7.26	WL, CR, AR
2nd place, silver medalist(s)	Luciana dos Santos	Brazil	6.81	6.68w	x	x	6.60w	6.74w	6.81	
3rd place, bronze medalist(s)	Gilda Massa	Peru	x	6.01	6.22	6.22	6.68w	x	6.68w	NR (6.22)
4	Mónica Falcioni	Uruguay	6.61w	6.52	x	6.51w	6.59w	6.29w	6.61w	
5	Andrea Ávila	Argentina	x	x	x	6.50	6.59w	6.36w	6.59w	
6	Nathaniel Gómez	Venezuela	6.10w	6.27	x	6.26w	6.03w	6.52w	6.52w	
7	Clara Córdoba	Colombia	5.76w	5.93w	6.03w	5.74w	5.60w	5.39w	6.03w	

=== Triple jump ===
June 27

Rank	Name	Nationality	#1	#2	#3	#4	#5	#6	Result	Notes
1st place, gold medalist(s)	Luciana dos Santos	Brazil	13.22	13.90	x	–	–	13.50	13.90	
2nd place, silver medalist(s)	Mónica Falcioni	Uruguay	x	x	13.29	13.57	13.51	13.51	13.57	
3rd place, bronze medalist(s)	Andrea Ávila	Argentina	x	13.42	13.45w	x	13.57	13.07	13.57	
	Clara Córdoba	Colombia	x	x	–	–	–	–	DNF	

=== Shot put ===
June 26

Rank	Name	Nationality	#1	#2	#3	#4	#5	#6	Result	Notes
1st place, gold medalist(s)	Elisângela Adriano	Brazil	19.02	18.70	x	x	18.18	x	19.02	CR, AR
2nd place, silver medalist(s)	Alexandra Amaro	Brazil							15.21	
3rd place, bronze medalist(s)	Marianne Berndt	Chile							15.00	
4	Luz Dary Castro	Colombia							14.05	
5	María Urrutia	Colombia							13.99	
6	Ana Cuastumal	Ecuador							9.97	

=== Discus throw ===
June 27

Rank	Name	Nationality	#1	#2	#3	#4	#5	#6	Result	Notes
1st place, gold medalist(s)	Elisângela Adriano	Brazil	60.27	53.53	x	x	56.14	x	60.27	CR
2nd place, silver medalist(s)	Luz Dary Castro	Colombia	x	x	50.73	50.95	x	x	50.95	
3rd place, bronze medalist(s)	Liliana Martinelli	Argentina							49.11	
4	María Eugenia Giggi	Argentina							48.93	
5	Katiuscia de Jesus	Brazil							48.26	
6	Fanny García	Venezuela							47.84	
7	Neolanis Suárez	Venezuela							47.56	
8	Bárbara Lewin	Chile							44.29	
9	Dennis Córdoba	Colombia							42.06	

=== Hammer throw ===
June 25

Rank	Name	Nationality	#1	#2	#3	#4	#5	#6	Result	Notes
1st place, gold medalist(s)	Karina Moya	Argentina	56.04	58.46	57.95	58.41	60.69	60.16	60.69	CR
2nd place, silver medalist(s)	María Eugenia Villamizar	Colombia	58.26	x	56.67	58.28	57.48	57.62	58.26	
3rd place, bronze medalist(s)	Josiane Soares	Brazil	55.76	55.22	55.20	x	57.23	56.94	57.23	NR
4	Margitt Wahlbrink	Brazil							53.56	
5	Zulma Lambert	Argentina							49.69	
6	Bélgica Ramos	Venezuela							46.34	
7	Ana Cuastumal	Ecuador							45.69	

=== Javelin throw ===
June 25

Rank	Name	Nationality	#1	#2	#3	#4	#5	#6	Result	Notes
1st place, gold medalist(s)	Sabina Moya	Colombia	53.72	58.81	55.60	58.57	57.91	56.51	58.81	CR
2nd place, silver medalist(s)	Sueli dos Santos	Brazil	58.16	x	x	51.31	52.58	51.61	58.16	
3rd place, bronze medalist(s)	Zuleima Araméndiz	Colombia	x	55.77	53.15	x	x	x	55.77	
4	Alessandra Resende	Brazil	x	53.31	54.34	52.72	53.75	54.25	54.34	
5	Paula Palma	Chile							43.85	

=== Heptathlon ===
June 25–26

The highest mark recorded in each event is highlighted in yellow

Rank	Athlete	Nationality	100m H	HJ	SP	200m	LJ	JT	800m	Points	Notes
1st place, gold medalist(s)	Euzinete dos Reis	Brazil	13.97	1.72	12.47	24.40	6.09	41.32	2:31.49	5741	CR
2nd place, silver medalist(s)	Elizete da Silva	Brazil	14.61	1.69	12.55	24.92	6.03	40.15	2:20.84	5669	
3rd place, bronze medalist(s)	Flor Robledo	Colombia	14.5	1.57	11.66	24.62	5.59	43.43	2:17.95	5474	
4	Gladibeth Morles	Venezuela	14.50	1.66	12.35	26.24	5.86	34.05	2:21.87	5333	NR
5	Judith Rivas	Colombia	15.31	1.60	13.02	24.98w	5.58	48.27	2:38.33	5296	
6	Minerva Navarrete	Chile	14.92	1.57	10.94	25.96w	5.60	34.52	2:22.31	5028	
7	Nathaniel Gómez	Venezuela	14.46	1.57	9.26	25.51w	6.11	27.31	DNF	4246	
8	Rocío Garzón	Ecuador	18.13	1.42	8.06	26.58w	5.09	30.01	2:30.16	3905	
	Natacha Rebaza	Peru	15.08	1.69	9.16	27.60	5.06	28.59	DNF	DNF	
