= 2005 South American Championships in Athletics – Results =

These are the official results of the 2005 South American Championships in Athletics which took place from July 21–24, 2005 in Cali, Colombia.

== Men's results ==
=== 100 meters ===
Heats – July 21
Wind:
Heat 1: -1.7 m/s, Heat 2: -0.4 m/s

Rank	Heat	Name	Nationality	Time	Notes
1	2	Vicente de Lima	Brazil	10.46	Q
2	1	André da Silva	Brazil	10.47	Q
3	2	Heber Viera	Uruguay	10.54	Q
4	1	Daniel Grueso	Colombia	10.58	Q
5	2	Iván Altamirano	Argentina	10.62	Q
6	2	Harlin Echavarría	Colombia	10.72	q
7	2	Kael Becerra	Chile	10.75	q
8	1	Diego Valdés	Chile	10.77	Q
9	1	Luis Morán	Ecuador	10.77	
10	1	José Manuel Garaventa	Argentina	10.78	
11	2	Andrés Gallegos	Ecuador	10.78	

Final – July 21
Wind:
+0.2 m/s

Rank	Name	Nationality	Time	Notes
1st place, gold medalist(s)	André da Silva	Brazil	10.32	
2nd place, silver medalist(s)	Vicente de Lima	Brazil	10.37	
3rd place, bronze medalist(s)	Heber Viera	Uruguay	10.43	
4	Daniel Grueso	Colombia	10.56	
5	Iván Altamirano	Argentina	10.61	
6	Kael Becerra	Chile	10.62	
7	Harlin Echavarría	Colombia	10.68	
8	Diego Valdés	Chile	10.79	

=== 200 meters ===
Heats – July 23
Wind:
Heat 1: 0.0 m/s, Heat 2: 0.0 m/s

Rank	Heat	Name	Nationality	Time	Notes
1	1	André da Silva	Brazil	20.87	Q
2	1	Heber Viera	Uruguay	20.91	Q
3	1	Geronimo Goeloe	Netherlands Antilles	20.94	Q
4	1	Daniel Grueso	Colombia	21.07	q
5	2	Vicente de Lima	Brazil	21.16	Q
6	1	José Acevedo	Venezuela	21.20	q
7	2	Hawar Murillo	Colombia	21.29	Q
8	2	José Carabalí	Venezuela	21.43	Q
9	1	Sebastián Keitel	Chile	21.50	
10	1	Luis Morán	Ecuador	21.70	
11	2	Kael Becerra	Chile	21.71	
12	2	Oscar Mina	Ecuador	21.90	
	2	Iván Altamirano	Argentina	DNF	

Final – July 23
Wind:
+4.9 m/s

Rank	Name	Nationality	Time	Notes
1st place, gold medalist(s)	André da Silva	Brazil	20.33	
2nd place, silver medalist(s)	Heber Viera	Uruguay	20.62	
3rd place, bronze medalist(s)	Geronimo Goeloe	Netherlands Antilles	20.80	
4	Daniel Grueso	Colombia	20.83	
5	José Acevedo	Venezuela	20.93	
6	Hawar Murillo	Colombia	20.98	
7	José Carabalí	Venezuela	21.09	
	Vicente de Lima	Brazil	DNF	

=== 400 meters ===
Heats – July 22

Rank	Heat	Name	Nationality	Time	Notes
1	2	Andrés Silva	Uruguay	46.10	Q
2	1	Sanderlei Parrela	Brazil	46.23	Q
3	2	Javier Mosquera	Colombia	46.24	Q
4	1	Geronimo Goeloe	Netherlands Antilles	46.47	Q
5	1	Gustavo Aguirre	Argentina	46.53	Q
6	1	Carlos Pena	Colombia	46.73	q
7	2	Luís Ambrosio	Brazil	46.92	Q
8	2	Josner Rodríguez	Venezuela	47.00	q
9	1	William Hernández	Venezuela	47.49	
10	1	Francisco Aguirre	Ecuador	48.22	
11	2	Marco Rivadeneira	Ecuador	50.39	

Final – July 22

Rank	Name	Nationality	Time	Notes
1st place, gold medalist(s)	Andrés Silva	Uruguay	45.38	
2nd place, silver medalist(s)	Sanderlei Parrela	Brazil	45.83	
3rd place, bronze medalist(s)	Gustavo Aguirre	Argentina	46.43	
4	Geronimo Goeloe	Netherlands Antilles	46.65	
5	Carlos Pena	Colombia	46.68	
6	Luís Ambrosio	Brazil	47.07	
7	Josner Rodríguez	Venezuela	47.09	
8	Javier Mosquera	Colombia	47.58	

=== 800 meters ===
July 24

Rank	Name	Nationality	Time	Notes
1st place, gold medalist(s)	Fabiano Peçanha	Brazil	1:47.02	
2nd place, silver medalist(s)	Diego Chargal Gomes	Brazil	1:48.30	
3rd place, bronze medalist(s)	Jhon Chávez	Colombia	1:48.65	
4	Fadrique Iglesias	Bolivia	1:48.76	
5	Leonardo Price	Argentina	1:49.64	
6	José Bermudez	Colombia	1:50.11	
7	Cristian Matute	Ecuador	1:52.0	
	Rodrigo Trinidad	Paraguay	DNS	
	Eduar Villanueva	Venezuela	DNS	

=== 1500 meters ===
July 22

Rank	Name	Nationality	Time	Notes
1st place, gold medalist(s)	Fabiano Peçanha	Brazil	3:41.51	
2nd place, silver medalist(s)	Bayron Piedra	Ecuador	3:41.90	
3rd place, bronze medalist(s)	Javier Carriqueo	Argentina	3:45.53	
4	Eduar Villanueva	Venezuela	3:46.90	
5	Jhon Chávez	Colombia	3:47.68	
6	André de Santana	Brazil	3:49.61	
7	Leonardo Price	Argentina	3:51.72	

=== 5000 meters ===
July 24

Rank	Name	Nationality	Time	Notes
1st place, gold medalist(s)	Bayron Piedra	Ecuador	14:12.24	
2nd place, silver medalist(s)	Jacinto López	Colombia	14:14.07	
3rd place, bronze medalist(s)	Javier Carriqueo	Argentina	14:19.10	
4	Rolando Ortiz	Colombia	14:33.28	
5	Claudir Rodrigues	Brazil	14:42.65	
6	Edgar Chancusig	Ecuador	15:20.74	
	Lionel Andrade	Guyana	DNF	
	Jhon Cusi	Peru	DNF	
	Fernando Alex Fernandes	Brazil	DNF	
	Collin Mercurius	Guyana	DNF	
	Juan Osvaldo Suarez	Argentina	DNS	

=== 10,000 meters ===
July 22

Rank	Name	Nationality	Time	Notes
1st place, gold medalist(s)	José Alirio Carrasco	Colombia	30:07.24	
2nd place, silver medalist(s)	Jhon Cusi	Peru	30:14.74	
3rd place, bronze medalist(s)	Diego Colorado	Colombia	30:15.55	
4	Elenilson da Silva	Brazil	30:27.60	
5	Francisco Roldán	Ecuador	32:22.30	
6	Lionel Andrade	Guyana	34:30.92	
7	Collin Mercurius	Guyana	36:03.77	
	Gilson da Silva	Brazil	DNF	

=== 110 meters hurdles ===
July 22
Wind: +3.4 m/s

Rank	Name	Nationality	Time	Notes
1st place, gold medalist(s)	Redelén dos Santos	Brazil	13.46	
2nd place, silver medalist(s)	Paulo Villar	Colombia	13.49	
3rd place, bronze medalist(s)	Matheus Facho Inocencio	Brazil	13.72	
4	Jonathan Davis	Venezuela	14.45	
5	Sadros Sánchez	Panama	14.57	
6	Francisco Schilling	Chile	14.58	
7	Oscar Candanoza	Colombia	14.65	
8	Leandro Peyrano	Argentina	14.73	

=== 400 meters hurdles ===
July 23

Rank	Name	Nationality	Time	Notes
1st place, gold medalist(s)	Tiago Bueno	Brazil	50.87	
2nd place, silver medalist(s)	Víctor Solarte	Venezuela	51.00	
3rd place, bronze medalist(s)	Cleverson da Silva	Brazil	52.32	
4	Oscar Candanoza	Colombia	52.41	
5	José Ignacio Pignataro	Argentina	52.55	
6	Christian Deymonnaz	Argentina	53.13	
7	Franklin Murillo	Colombia	53.19	
8	Esteban Lucero	Ecuador	55.75	

=== 3000 meters steeplechase ===
July 23

Rank	Name	Nationality	Time	Notes
1st place, gold medalist(s)	Mariano Mastromarino	Argentina	9:02.89	
2nd place, silver medalist(s)	Fernando Alex Fernandes	Brazil	9:04.46	
3rd place, bronze medalist(s)	Sergio Lobos	Chile	9:08.59	
4	Julio Pulido	Colombia	9:14.35	
5	José Eraldo de Lima	Brazil	9:16.63	
6	Diego Moreno	Peru	9:18.34	
7	Gerardo Villacres	Ecuador	9:18.35	
8	Wilder Álvarez	Colombia	9:20.77	
	José Calzadilla	Venezuela	DNS	

=== 4 x 100 meters relay ===
July 23

Rank	Nation	Competitors	Time	Notes
1st place, gold medalist(s)	Brazil	André da Silva, Vicente de Lima, Jorge Célio Sena, José Carlos Moreira	39.17	
2nd place, silver medalist(s)	Colombia	Harlin Echavarría, Eduard Mena, Daniel Grueso, Nicoll Navas	39.85	
3rd place, bronze medalist(s)	Ecuador	Hugo Chila, Andrés Gallegos, Luis Morán, Oscar Mina	40.45	
4	Argentina	José Manuel Garaventa, Leandro Peyrano, Eric Kerwitz, Iván Altamirano	40.66	

=== 4 x 400 meters relay ===
July 24

Rank	Nation	Competitors	Time	Notes
1st place, gold medalist(s)	Brazil	Luís Ambrosio, Sanderlei Parrela, Thiago Chyaromont, Wagner Souza	3:04.15	
2nd place, silver medalist(s)	Colombia	Amílcar Torres, Franklin Murillo, Javier Mosquera, Carlos Pena	3:05.94	
3rd place, bronze medalist(s)	Argentina	Gustavo Aguirre, Iván Altamirano, Christian Deymonnaz, José Ignacio Pignataro	3:08.61	
4	Venezuela	William Hernández, José Faneite, José Acevedo, Josner Rodríguez	3:09.02	
	Ecuador		DNS	

=== 20 kilometers walk ===
July 22

Rank	Name	Nationality	Time	Notes
1st place, gold medalist(s)	Jefferson Pérez	Ecuador	1:22:54	CR
2nd place, silver medalist(s)	Rolando Saquipay	Ecuador	1:22.55	
3rd place, bronze medalist(s)	Luis Fernando López	Colombia	1:23.43	
4	Carlos Borgono	Chile	1:34.31	
	Gustavo Restrepo*	Colombia	1:24.46	
	José Alessandro Bagio	Brazil	DNF	
	Mário dos Santos	Brazil	DNF	
	Fredy Hernández	Colombia	DQ	
	Ronald Huayta	Bolivia	DQ	
	Dionisio Neira	Peru	DQ	

=== High jump ===
July 24

Rank	Name	Nationality	Result	Notes
1st place, gold medalist(s)	Gilmar Mayo	Colombia	2.22	
2nd place, silver medalist(s)	Erasmo Jara	Argentina	2.19	
3rd place, bronze medalist(s)	Rodrigo de Assis	Brazil	2.16	
4	Fábio Baptista	Brazil	2.16	
5	Santiago Guerci	Argentina	2.10	
6	Wanner Miller	Colombia	2.05	
7	Cristian Calle	Ecuador	2.05	
8	León Beltrán	Venezuela	2.05	

=== Pole vault ===
July 22

Rank	Name	Nationality	Result	Notes
1st place, gold medalist(s)	Fábio Gomes da Silva	Brazil	5.40	
2nd place, silver medalist(s)	Javier Benítez	Argentina	5.20	
3rd place, bronze medalist(s)	Germán Chiaraviglio	Argentina	5.10	
4	Víctor Medina	Colombia	4.40	
	Henrique Martins	Brazil	?	
	Arturo Posada	Colombia	?	
	Lenin Sambrano	Ecuador	?	

=== Long jump ===
July 23

Rank	Name	Nationality	Result	Notes
1st place, gold medalist(s)	Erivaldo Vieira	Brazil	8.15	
2nd place, silver medalist(s)	Tiago Jacinto Dias	Brazil	7.93	
3rd place, bronze medalist(s)	Esteban Copland	Venezuela	7.92	
4	Louis Tristán	Peru	7.70	
5	Carlos Jaramillo	Ecuador	7.57	
6	Eric Kerwitz	Argentina	7.38	
7	Daimnler Griego	Colombia	7.24	
	Hugo Chila	Ecuador	?	
	Lewis Asprilla	Colombia	?	

=== Triple jump ===
July 22

Rank	Name	Nationality	Result	Notes
1st place, gold medalist(s)	Jefferson Sabino	Brazil	16.24	
2nd place, silver medalist(s)	Hugo Chila	Ecuador	15.91	
3rd place, bronze medalist(s)	Carlos Carabalí	Colombia	15.85	
4	Johnny Rodríguez	Venezuela	15.63	
5	Leisnes Aragón	Colombia	15.16	

=== Shot put ===
July 22

Rank	Name	Nationality	Result	Notes
1st place, gold medalist(s)	Marco Antonio Verni	Chile	18.43	
2nd place, silver medalist(s)	Yojer Medina	Venezuela	18.32	
3rd place, bronze medalist(s)	Jhonny Rodríguez	Colombia	18.22	
4	Germán Lauro	Argentina	17.96	
5	Jiovanny García	Colombia	17.93	
6	Ronald Juliao	Brazil	16.97	
7	Daniel Munoz	Chile	16.48	
8	Daniel Freire	Brazil	16.39	
9	Mário Sambrano	Ecuador	13.29	

=== Discus throw ===
July 24

Rank	Name	Nationality	Result	Notes
1st place, gold medalist(s)	Jorge Balliengo	Argentina	60.97	
2nd place, silver medalist(s)	Marcelo Pugliese	Argentina	56.76	
3rd place, bronze medalist(s)	Ronald Juliao	Brazil	56.51	
4	Héctor Hurtado	Venezuela	54.24	
5	Jesús Parejo	Venezuela	52.33	
6	Gustavo Mendonça	Brazil	49.95	
7	Gabriel Hugo	Ecuador	45.88	
	Julián Angulo	Colombia	DNS	
	Jhonny Rodríguez	Colombia	DNS	

=== Hammer throw ===
July 24

Rank	Name	Nationality	Result	Notes
1st place, gold medalist(s)	Juan Ignacio Cerra	Argentina	72.03	
2nd place, silver medalist(s)	Wagner Domingos	Brazil	67.33	
3rd place, bronze medalist(s)	Patricio Palma	Chile	67.10	
4	Eduardo Acuna	Peru	66.73	
5	Adrián Marzo	Argentina	65.26	
6	Roberto Sáez	Chile	65.01	
7	Armando dos Santos	Brazil	61.88	
8	Freimar Arias	Colombia	58.78	
9	Lenin Proano	Ecuador	50.06	
	Jacobo de Leon	Colombia	?	

=== Javelin throw ===
July 24

Rank	Name	Nationality	Result	Notes
1st place, gold medalist(s)	Luiz Fernando da Silva	Brazil	79.44	
2nd place, silver medalist(s)	Júlio César de Oliveira	Brazil	73.60	
3rd place, bronze medalist(s)	Noraldo Palacios	Colombia	73.54	
4	Ronald Noguera	Venezuela	71.87	
5	Pablo Pietrobelli	Argentina	68.48	
6	Diego Moraga	Chile	67.20	
7	Jhony Viafara	Colombia	65.84	
8	Xavier Mercado	Ecuador	60.79	

=== Decathlon ===
The highest mark recorded in each event is highlighted in yellow

Rank	Athlete	Nationality	100m	LJ	SP	HJ	400m	110m H	DT	PV	JT	1500m	Points	Notes
1st place, gold medalist(s)	Jorge Naranjo	Chile	11.37	7.43	12.98	2.08	50.89	15.04	32.64	5.20	41.11	4:39.83	7489	
2nd place, silver medalist(s)	Iván Scolfaro da Silva	Brazil	11.40	6.90	13.10	1.96	48.90	14.91	40.53	4.50	52.96	4:46.59	7437	
3rd place, bronze medalist(s)	Andrés Mantilla	Colombia	11.30	6.82	13.65	1.99	49.69	14.77	42.23	4.00	49.73	4:37.33	7383	
4	Carlos Chinin	Brazil	11.14	7.21	12.47	2.08	50.27	14.81	37.92	3.80	46.59	4:36.47	7307	
5	Santiago Lorenzo	Argentina	11.41	6.94	?	1.87	49.04	15.12	39.93	4.80	52.05	4:34.46	6798	
6	José Francisco Nava	Chile	11.11	7.09	10.26	1.78	49.73	16.84	27.98	4.60	42.12	5:28.63	6344	
	Enrique Aguirre	Argentina	11.71	6.43	13.92	1.96	?	DNS	–	–	–	–	DNF	

== Women's results ==
=== 100 meters ===
July 22
Wind: +0.5 m/s

Rank	Name	Nationality	Time	Notes
1st place, gold medalist(s)	Lucimar de Moura	Brazil	11.25	
2nd place, silver medalist(s)	Melisa Murillo	Colombia	11.39	
3rd place, bronze medalist(s)	Luciana dos Santos	Brazil	11.46	
4	Yomara Hinestroza	Colombia	11.50	
5	Vanesa Wohlgemuth	Argentina	12.00	
6	Daniela Riderelli	Chile	12.02	

=== 200 meters ===
July 23
Wind: +5.0 m/s

Rank	Name	Nationality	Time	Notes
1st place, gold medalist(s)	Lucimar de Moura	Brazil	22.98	
2nd place, silver medalist(s)	Felipa Palacios	Colombia	23.14	
3rd place, bronze medalist(s)	Wilmary Álvarez	Venezuela	23.14	
4	Darlenys Obregón	Colombia	23.18	
5	Raquel da Costa	Brazil	23.88	
6	María José Echeverría	Chile	23.95	
7	Daniela Riderelli	Chile	24.44	
8	Vanesa Wohlgemuth	Argentina	24.97	

=== 400 meters ===
Heats – July 22

Rank	Heat	Name	Nationality	Time	Notes
1	2	Maria Laura Almirao	Brazil	53.22	Q
2	1	Geisa Coutinho	Brazil	53.34	Q
3	1	Lucy Jaramillo	Ecuador	54.09	Q
4	1	María Alejandra Idrobo	Colombia	54.36	Q
5	2	Norma González	Colombia	54.85	Q
6	1	Eliana Pacheco	Venezuela	55.48	q
7	2	Wilmary Álvarez	Venezuela	55.52	Q
8	2	María Fernanda Mackenna	Chile	55.52	q
9	1	Nicole Manríquez	Chile	55.92	
10	2	Pamela Freire	Ecuador	58.33	

Final – July 22

Rank	Name	Nationality	Time	Notes
1st place, gold medalist(s)	Maria Laura Almirao	Brazil	52.32	
2nd place, silver medalist(s)	Geisa Coutinho	Brazil	52.94	
3rd place, bronze medalist(s)	Wilmary Álvarez	Venezuela	53.57	
4	María Alejandra Idrobo	Colombia	54.53	
5	Lucy Jaramillo	Ecuador	54.70	
6	María Fernanda Mackenna	Chile	55.52	
	Norma González	Colombia	DNF	
	Eliana Pacheco	Venezuela	DNS	

=== 800 meters ===
July 24

Rank	Name	Nationality	Time	Notes
1st place, gold medalist(s)	Rosibel García	Colombia	2:03.28	
2nd place, silver medalist(s)	Jenny Mejías	Venezuela	2:04.93	
3rd place, bronze medalist(s)	Perla Regina dos Santos	Brazil	2:06.04	
4	Lucy Jaramillo	Ecuador	2:08.77	
5	Muriel Coneo	Colombia	2:09.00	
6	Patrícia Lobo	Brazil	2:24.44	

=== 1500 meters ===
July 22

Rank	Name	Nationality	Time	Notes
1st place, gold medalist(s)	Rosibel García	Colombia	4:29.63	
2nd place, silver medalist(s)	María Peralta	Argentina	4:30.37	
3rd place, bronze medalist(s)	Valeria Rodríguez	Argentina	4:31.35	
4	Yeisy Álvarez	Venezuela	4:33.10	
5	Ángela Figueroa	Colombia	4:38.65	

=== 5000 meters ===
July 24

Rank	Name	Nationality	Time	Notes
1st place, gold medalist(s)	Bertha Sánchez	Colombia	16:47.03	
2nd place, silver medalist(s)	Lucélia Peres	Brazil	17:03.55	
3rd place, bronze medalist(s)	Nadir de Siqueira	Brazil	17:16.33	
4	Susana Rebolledo	Chile	17:19.59	
5	Raquel Aceituno	Peru	17:19.62	
6	Ruby Riativa	Colombia	17:38.41	
	Rosa Chacha	Ecuador	DNF	
	Valeria Rodríguez	Argentina	DNF	
	Niusha Mancilla	Bolivia	DNS	
	Eliana Silva	Chile	DNS	

=== 10,000 meters ===
July 22

Rank	Name	Nationality	Time	Notes
1st place, gold medalist(s)	Bertha Sánchez	Colombia	34:34.40	
2nd place, silver medalist(s)	Lucélia Peres	Brazil	34:51.12	
3rd place, bronze medalist(s)	Ruby Riativa	Colombia	35:38.02	
4	Roxana Preussler	Argentina	35:53.90	
5	Nadir de Siqueira	Brazil	35:58.31	
6	Raquel Aceituno	Peru	36:11.30	
7	Eliana Silva	Chile	36:21.52	

=== 100 meters hurdles ===
July 22
Wind: +0.1 m/s

Rank	Name	Nationality	Time	Notes
1st place, gold medalist(s)	Maíla Machado	Brazil	13.18	
2nd place, silver medalist(s)	Princesa Oliveros	Colombia	13.51	
3rd place, bronze medalist(s)	Brigitte Merlano	Colombia	13.68	
4	Francisca Guzmán	Chile	13.85	
5	Patricia Riesco	Peru	14.04	
6	Isabel Silva	Brazil	14.16	
7	Alejandra Llorente	Argentina	14.39	
8	Karina Caicedo	Ecuador	16.09	

=== 400 meters hurdles ===
July 23

Rank	Name	Nationality	Time	Notes
1st place, gold medalist(s)	Perla Regina dos Santos	Brazil	58.33	
2nd place, silver medalist(s)	Lucimar Teodoro	Brazil	59.27	
3rd place, bronze medalist(s)	Lucy Jaramillo	Ecuador	59.78	
4	Princesa Oliveros	Colombia	59.79	
5	Patricia Riesco	Peru	1:05.53	
6	Karina Caicedo	Ecuador	1:05.59	
	Sandrine Legenort	Venezuela	DNS	

=== 3000 meters steeplechase ===
July 23

Rank	Name	Nationality	Time	Notes
1st place, gold medalist(s)	Patrícia Lobo	Brazil	10:36.21	
2nd place, silver medalist(s)	Mónica Amboya	Ecuador	10:43.67	
3rd place, bronze medalist(s)	Yolanda Caballero	Colombia	10:48.36	
4	Ángela Figueroa	Colombia	10:52.06	
5	María Peralta	Argentina	10:58.69	

=== 4 x 100 meters relay ===
July 23

Rank	Nation	Competitors	Time	Notes
1st place, gold medalist(s)	Colombia	Melisa Murillo, Felipa Palacios, Darlenys Obregón, Norma González	43.17	
2nd place, silver medalist(s)	Brazil	Luciana dos Santos, Lucimar de Moura, Raquel da Costa, Thatiana Regina Ignâcio	44.35	
3rd place, bronze medalist(s)	Chile	María José Echeverría, Daniela Riderelli, María Fernanda Mackenna, Nicole Manríquez	44.77	
4	Venezuela	Jennifer Arveláez, Wilmary Álvarez, Ángela Alfonso, Sandrine Legenort	46.24	
5	Ecuador	Virna Salazar, Pamela Freire, María Batallas, Karina Caicedo	49.64	

=== 4 x 400 meters relay ===
July 23

Rank	Nation	Competitors	Time	Notes
1st place, gold medalist(s)	Brazil	Amanda Dias, Geisa Coutinho, Maria Laura Almirao, Lucimar Teodoro	3:29.24	
2nd place, silver medalist(s)	Colombia	María Alejandra Idrobo, Rosibel García, Felipa Palacios, Norma González	3:36.95	
3rd place, bronze medalist(s)	Chile	María José Echeverría, Daniela Riderelli, María Fernanda Mackenna, Nicole Manríquez	3:40.49	
4	Ecuador	Karina Caicedo, Mónica Amboya, Pamela Freire, Lucy Jaramillo	3:52.76	
	Venezuela		DNS	

=== 20 kilometers walk ===
July 23

Rank	Name	Nationality	Time	Notes
1st place, gold medalist(s)	Sandra Zapata	Colombia	1:40:54	
2nd place, silver medalist(s)	Tatiana Orellana	Ecuador	1:45:12	
3rd place, bronze medalist(s)	Gianetti Bonfim	Brazil	1:48:16	
4	Josette Sepúlveda	Chile	1:53:15	
	Nydia Moreno	Colombia	DNF	
	Alessandra Picagevicz	Brazil	DNF	

=== High jump ===
July 22

Rank	Name	Nationality	Result	Notes
1st place, gold medalist(s)	Caterine Ibargüen	Colombia	1.93	CR, NR
2nd place, silver medalist(s)	Solange Witteveen	Argentina	1.88	
3rd place, bronze medalist(s)	Marielys Rojas	Venezuela	1.79	
3rd place, bronze medalist(s)	Eliana Renata da Silva	Brazil	1.79	
5	Mônica de Freitas	Brazil	1.79	
6	Kerstin Weiss	Chile	1.79	
7	Tatiana Rodríguez	Colombia	1.70	
8	Francisca Ortiz	Ecuador	1.70	

=== Pole vault ===
July 23

Rank	Name	Nationality	Result	Notes
1st place, gold medalist(s)	Joana Costa	Brazil	4.20	
2nd place, silver medalist(s)	Fabiana Murer	Brazil	4.00	
3rd place, bronze medalist(s)	Milena Agudelo	Colombia	4.00	
4	Karina Quejada	Colombia	3.60	
5	Lorena Ortiz	Ecuador	3.10	
	Alejandra García	Argentina	?	

=== Long jump ===
July 23

Rank	Name	Nationality	Result	Notes
1st place, gold medalist(s)	Luciana dos Santos	Brazil	6.39	
2nd place, silver medalist(s)	Keila Costa	Brazil	6.32	
3rd place, bronze medalist(s)	Caterine Ibargüen	Colombia	6.30	
4	Elena Guerrero	Colombia	6.06	
5	Jennifer Arveláez	Venezuela	5.81	
6	Daniela Coronel	Venezuela	5.77	
7	María Batallas	Ecuador	5.52	
8	Alejandra Llorente	Argentina	5.49	

=== Triple jump ===
July 24

Rank	Name	Nationality	Result	Notes
1st place, gold medalist(s)	Gisele de Oliveira	Brazil	13.90	
2nd place, silver medalist(s)	Keila Costa	Brazil	13.75	
3rd place, bronze medalist(s)	Caterine Ibargüen	Colombia	13.59	
4	Jennifer Arveláez	Venezuela	13.49	
5	Ludmila Reyes	Venezuela	13.42	
6	Johanna Trivino	Colombia	13.07	
7	Macarena Reyes	Chile	12.84	
8	Daysi Ugarte	Bolivia	12.55	
9	María Batallas	Ecuador	12.11	

=== Shot put ===
July 23

Rank	Name	Nationality	Result	Notes
1st place, gold medalist(s)	Andréa Maria Britto	Brazil	16.60	
2nd place, silver medalist(s)	Luz Dary Castro	Colombia	16.27	
3rd place, bronze medalist(s)	Rosario Ramos	Venezuela	14.67	
4	Marianne Berndt	Chile	14.56	
5	Regiane Alves	Brazil	13.78	
6	Johana Ramírez	Colombia	13.65	
7	Karina Díaz	Ecuador	13.51	
8	Ximena Araneda	Chile	12.76	

=== Discus throw ===
July 24

Rank	Name	Nationality	Result	Notes
1st place, gold medalist(s)	Luz Dary Castro	Colombia	53.49	
2nd place, silver medalist(s)	Rosario Ramos	Venezuela	52.46	
3rd place, bronze medalist(s)	Renata de Figueiredo	Brazil	51.74	
4	Ximena Araneda	Chile	49.72	
5	Marianne Berndt	Chile	49.00	
6	Karina Díaz	Ecuador	47.93	
7	Katiuscia de Jesus	Brazil	45.90	
8	Johana Ramírez	Colombia	40.02	

=== Hammer throw ===
July 24

Rank	Name	Nationality	Result	Notes
1st place, gold medalist(s)	Jennifer Dahlgren	Argentina	65.05	
2nd place, silver medalist(s)	Johana Moreno	Colombia	61.65	
3rd place, bronze medalist(s)	Rosa Rodríguez	Venezuela	61.51	
4	Johana Ramírez	Colombia	60.11	
5	Josiane Soares	Brazil	59.91	
6	Odette Palma	Chile	59.60	
7	Karina Moya	Argentina	59.39	
8	Katiuscia de Jesus	Brazil	57.31	

=== Javelin throw ===
July 23

Rank	Name	Nationality	Result	Notes
1st place, gold medalist(s)	Alessandra Resende	Brazil	56.06	
2nd place, silver medalist(s)	Zuleima Araméndiz	Colombia	54.81	
3rd place, bronze medalist(s)	Romina Maggi	Argentina	48.76	
4	Jeny Llulluna	Ecuador	45.35	
5	Tatiana Valencia	Colombia	45.22	
6	Jucilene de Lima	Brazil	44.74	
	Leryn Franco	Paraguay	?	

=== Heptathlon ===
The highest mark recorded in each event is highlighted in yellow

Rank	Athlete	Nationality	100m H	HJ	SP	200m	LJ	JT	800m	Points	Notes
1st place, gold medalist(s)	Elizete da Silva	Brazil	14.8	1.64	11.69	24.87	5.92	41.28	2:25.33	5429	
2nd place, silver medalist(s)	Andrea Bordalejo	Argentina	14.4	1.64	11.31	25.81	5.81	34.66	2:22.58	5249	
3rd place, bronze medalist(s)	Daniela Crespo	Argentina	14.9	1.76	8.34	25.36	5.59	32.25	2:14.59	5170	
4	Lucimara da Silva	Brazil	15.2	1.70	11.00	25.07	5.82	36.59	2:37.81	5109	
5	Nasly Perea	Colombia	14.5	1.67	10.65	26.37	5.66	30.95	2:31.27	4950	
6	Diana Ibargüen	Colombia	14.2	1.55	11.82	26.57	5.81	34.29	2:39.62	4950	
7	Daysi Ugarte	Bolivia	15.6	1.52	8.74	25.86	5.45	24.62	2:18.47	4539	
8	Virna Salazar	Ecuador	15.2	1.58	8.24	27.05	5.52	34.64	2:36.27	4506	
