= Athletics at the 2001 Bolivarian Games =

Athletics at the XIV Bolivarian Games
- Dates: September 12–15
- Host city: Ambato, Ecuador
- Venue: Pista Atlética Huachi-Loreto
- Level: Senior
- Events: 47 (24 men, 23 women)

Athletics competitions at the 2001 Bolivarian Games were held at the Pista Atlética Huachi-Loreto in Ambato, Ecuador, between September 12 and 15, 2001.

Gold medal winners from Ecuador were published by the Comité Olímpico Ecuatoriano. A total of 47 events were contested, 24 by men and 23 by women.

== Medal summary ==
Medal winners were published.

All results are marked as "affected by altitude" (A), because the stadium in Ambato is 2,620 metres (8,600 ft) above sea level.

=== Men ===
Event	Gold		Silver		Bronze	
100 metres (wind: -0.9 m/s)	John Córdoba (COL)	10.37 A	Luis Morán (ECU)	10.47 A	Juan Morillo (VEN)	10.50 A
200 metres (wind: -1.5 m/s)	John Córdoba (COL)	20.87 A	Helly Ollarves (VEN)	20.98 A	Jimmy Pino (COL)	21.11 A
400 metres	Jonathan Palma (VEN)	45.55 A	William Hernández (VEN)	46.49 A	Danny Núñez (VEN)	46.75 A
800 metres	Simoncito Silvera (VEN)	1:50.02 A	Jonathan Palma (VEN)	1:50.11 A	Fadrique Iglesias (BOL)	1:51.64 A
1500 metres	Freddy González (VEN)	3:56.21 A	Mauricio Ladino (COL)	3:56.84 A	Juan A. Perea (COL)	3:57.35 A
5000 metres	Franklin Tenorio (ECU)	14:50.25 A	William Naranjo (COL)	14:52.26 A	Diego Colorado (COL)	14:59.16 A
10,000 metres	Silvio Guerra (ECU)	30:28.58 A	Diego Colorado (COL)	31:17.36 A	José Alejandro Semprún (VEN)	31:25.73 A
Marathon	Hugo Jiménez (COL)	2:33:14 A	Jesús Virrueta (PER)	2:37:31 A	Francisco Roldán (ECU)	2:38:08 A
3000 metres steeplechase	Richard Arias (ECU)	9:12.22 A	Néstor Nieves (VEN)	9:23.77 A	Emigdio Delgado (VEN)	9:24.71 A
110 metres hurdles (wind: 0.3 m/s)	Paulo Villar (COL)	13.58 A	Jackson Quiñónez (ECU)	13.64 A	Marleán Reina (VEN)	14.16 A
400 metres hurdles	José Gregorio Turbay (VEN)	51.06 A	José Carvajal (COL)	52.17 A	José Ferrín (ECU)	53.18 A
4 x 100 metres relay	Venezuela; Juan Morillo; José Pena; José Manuel Carabalí; Helly Ollarves	39.57 A	Colombia; Wilmer Murillo; Jhon Córdoba; Jimmy Pino; Nestor Miller	40.01 A	Ecuador; Jaime Noblecilla; Luis Morán; Cristián Gutiérrez; Jackson Quiñónez	40.80 A
4 x 400 metres relay	Venezuela	3:08.15 A	Colombia	3:10.61 A	Ecuador; Luis Morán; Dick Perlaza; Ernesto Borja; Cristián Gutiérrez	3:10.83 A
20 Kilometres Road Walk	Jefferson Pérez (ECU)	1:30:27 A	Patricio Villacorte (ECU)	1:35:56 A	Marco Taipe (PER)	1:37:59 A
50 Kilometres Road Walk	Patricio Villacorte (ECU)	4:27:57 A	Fausto Quinde (ECU)	4:33:22 A	Rolando Saquipay (ECU)	4:40:37 A
High jump	Gilmar Mayo (COL)	2.23 A	Jackson Quiñónez (ECU)	2.20 A	Franco Moy (PER)	2.19 A
Pole vault	Johnny Romero (VEN)	4.60 A	Jackson Angulo (COL)	4.10 A		
Long jump	Esteban Copland (VEN)	8.18 A w	José Reyes (VEN)	7.65 A	Lewis Asprilla (COL)	7.38 A w
Triple jump	Freddy Nieves (ECU)	16.69 A	Alvin Rentería (COL)	16.66 A	Leisner Aragón (COL)	16.54 A
Shot put	Yojer Medina (VEN)	19.44 A	Jhonny Rodríguez (COL)	18.90 A	Orlando Ibarra (COL)	17.24 A
Discus throw	Yojer Medina (VEN)	52.68 A	Juan Tello (PER)	50.94 A	Orlando Ibarra (COL)	50.12 A
Hammer throw	Aldo Bello (VEN)	65.95 A	Eduardo Acuña (PER)	65.08 A	Jesús Parejo (VEN)	53.84 A
Javelin throw	Noraldo Palacios (COL)	73.40 A	Ronald Noguera (VEN)	73.06 A	Manuel Fuenmayor (VEN)	72.38 A
Decathlon	Darrin Mijares (VEN)	6830 A	Marcos Reyes (VEN)	6746 A	Wílmer Cortez (ECU)	6437 A

=== Women ===
Event	Gold		Silver		Bronze	
100 metres (wind: -2.0 m/s)	Mirtha Brock (COL)	11.82 A	Melisa Murillo (COL)	11.88 A	Miriam Caicedo (COL)	12.00 A
200 metres (wind: 0.9 m/s)	Felipa Palacios (COL)	22.92 A	Digna Luz Murillo (COL)	23.83 A	Wilmary Álvarez (VEN)	24.04 A
400 metres	Norma González (COL)	52.73 A	Eliana Pacheco (VEN)	54.82 A	Yusmelys García (VEN)	54.94 A
800 metres	Niusha Mancilla (BOL)	2:03.98 A	Rosibel García (COL)	2:08.97 A	Mercy Colorado (ECU)	2:09.65 A
1500 metres	Niusha Mancilla (BOL)	4:22.6 A	Bertha Sánchez (COL)	4:38.2 A	Mariela Álvarez (PER)	4:40.7 A
5000 metres	Martha Tenorio (ECU)	17:16.3 A	Sonia Calizaya (BOL)	17:22.1 A	María Paredes (ECU)	17:49.5 A
10,000 metres	Martha Tenorio (ECU)	36:04.0 A	Rosa Apaza (BOL)	36:51.5 A	Sonia Calizaya (BOL)	36:59.8 A
Marathon	Justina Calizaya (BOL)	3:06:06 A	Myriam Pulido (COL)	3:07:04 A	Yolanda Quimbita (ECU)	3:13:04 A
3000 metres steeplechase	Niusha Mancilla (BOL)	10:40.7 A	Marlene Acuña (ECU)	11:51.1 A	Bertha Sánchez (COL)	11:53.1 A
100 metres hurdles (wind: -0.5 m/s)	Princesa Oliveros (COL)	13.0 A	Sandrine Legenort (VEN)	14.1 A	Virginia Wila (ECU)	15.1 A
400 metres hurdles	Princesa Oliveros (COL)	58.21 A	Yusmelys García (VEN)	60.34 A	Lucy Jaramillo (ECU)	60.89 A
4 x 100 metres relay	Colombia; Felipa Palacios; Miryam Caicedo; Melisa Murillo; Mirtha Brock	44.18 A	Venezuela ? ? ? Wilmary Álvarez	46.03 A	Ecuador; Noelia Caicedo; Viviana Silva; Rosa Cabezas; Ana Caicedo	47.12 A
4 x 400 metres relay	Colombia ? ? ? Norma González	3:36.32 A	Ecuador; Rebeca Cabezas; Rosa Cabezas; Gabriela Chalá; Lucy Jaramillo	3:44.38 A	Venezuela ? ? Eliana Pacheco; Yusmely García	3:45.30 A
20 Kilometres Road Walk	Geovana Irusta (BOL)	1:45:04 A	Morelba Useche (VEN)	1:48:08 A	Cristina Bohórquez (COL)	1:51:56 A
High jump	Caterine Ibargüen (COL)	1.79 A	Jhoris Luque (VEN)	1.79 A	Yetzálida Pérez (VEN)	1.73 A
Pole vault	Yoisemil Fuentes (VEN)	3.50 A	Milena Agudelo (COL)	3.40 A	Elizabeth Restrepo (COL)	3.30 A
Long jump	Helena Guerrero (COL)	6.66 A w	Jennifer Arveláez (VEN)	6.44 A w	Ana Caicedo (ECU)	6.14 A w
Triple jump	Jennifer Arveláez (VEN)	13.58 A	Ludmila Reyes (VEN)	13.46 A	Ivonne Patarroyo (COL)	12.07 A
Shot put	Luz Dary Castro (COL)	15.84 A	Yanira Hurtado (VEN)	14.82 A	Neolanis Suárez (VEN)	14.80 A
Discus throw	Luz Dary Castro (COL)	52.72 A	Neolanis Suárez (VEN)	49.06 A	Denis Córdoba (COL)	48.48 A
Hammer throw	María Eugenia Villamizar (COL)	58.26 A	Yaiza Córdoba (COL)	55.32 A	Dubraska Rodríguez (VEN)	54.14 A
Javelin throw	Sabina Moya (COL)	55.58 A	Zuleima Araméndiz (COL)	55.56 A	María González (VEN)	48.60 A
Heptathlon	Zorobabelia Córdoba (COL)	5436 A	Thaimara Rivas (VEN)	5025 A	Osmary Sequea (VEN)	4711 A

== Medal table (unofficial) ==
* Host nation (Ecuador)

Rank	Nation	Gold	Silver	Bronze	Total
1	Colombia	20	17	13	50
2	Venezuela	14	18	15	47
3	Ecuador*	8	7	13	28
4	Bolivia	5	2	2	9
5	Peru	0	3	3	6
Totals (5 entries)		47	47	46	140
