= Katiuscia de Jesus =

Brazilian athlete (born 1977)

Personal information
- Born: 8 May 1977 (age 48)

Sport
- Sport: Track and field
- Event: Hammer throw

Katiuscia Maria Borges de Jesus (born 8 May 1977) is a retired Brazilian athlete who specialised in the hammer throw. She won multiple medals on regional level.

Her personal best of 64.58 metres, set in 2006, is stood as the national record until June 2016.

== Competition record ==
Year	Competition	Venue	Position	Event	Notes
Representing Brazil
1992	South American Youth Championships	Santiago, Chile	3rd	Discus throw	39.52 m
1993	South American Junior Championships	Puerto la Cruz, Venezuela	4th	Shot put	11.42 m
1993	South American Junior Championships	Puerto la Cruz, Venezuela	7th	Discus throw	38.06 m
1995	Pan American Junior Championships	Santiago, Chile	4th	Discus throw	47.44 m
1995	South American Junior Championships	Santiago, Chile	4th	Discus throw	40.84 m
1995	South American Junior Championships	Santiago, Chile	4th	Hammer throw	41.68 m
1996	South American Junior Championships	Bucaramanga, Colombia	1st	Shot put	14.01 m
1996	South American Junior Championships	Bucaramanga, Colombia	2nd	Discus throw	43.86 m
1996	South American Junior Championships	Bucaramanga, Colombia	2nd	Hammer throw	44.22 m
1996	World Junior Championships	Sydney, Australia	19th (q)	Discus throw	42.94 m
1999	South American Championships	Bogotá, Colombia	5th	Discus throw	48.26 m
2000	Ibero-American Championships	Rio de Janeiro, Brazil	1st	Discus throw	51.41 m
2001	South American Championships	Manaus, Brazil	2nd	Discus throw	49.52 m
2001	South American Championships	Manaus, Brazil	5th	Hammer throw	54.82 m
2002	Ibero-American Championships	Guatemala City, Guatemala	7th	Hammer throw	54.49 m
2003	South American Championships	Barquisimeto, Venezuela	1st	Hammer throw	61.01 m
2004	Ibero-American Championships	Huelva, Spain	14th	Hammer throw	55.02 m
2005	South American Championships	Cali, Colombia	8th	Hammer throw	57.31 m
2006	Ibero-American Championships	Ponce, Puerto Rico	7th	Hammer throw	59.28 m
2006	South American Championships	Tunja, Colombia	3rd	Hammer throw	64.58 m
2007	South American Championships	São Paulo, Brazil	2nd	Hammer throw	61.57 m
2007	Pan American Games	Rio de Janeiro, Brazil	12th	Hammer throw	59.23 m
2009	South American Championships	Lima, Peru	5th	Hammer throw	60.20 m
