= Athletics at the 1999 Pan American Games – Men's long jump =

Men's long jump at the Pan American Games

The men's long jump event at the 1999 Pan American Games was held on July 25.

== Results ==
Rank	Name	Nationality	#1	#2	#3	#4	#5	#6	Result	Notes
1st place, gold medalist(s)	Iván Pedroso	Cuba	x	x	8.08	x	8.43	8.52	8.52	
2nd place, silver medalist(s)	Kareem Streete-Thompson	Cayman Islands	7.86	x	7.84	x	7.99	8.12	8.12	
3rd place, bronze medalist(s)	Luis Felipe Méliz	Cuba	7.59	7.78	7.75	7.77	7.93	8.06	8.06	
4	Richard Duncan	Canada	8.01	7.93	x	x	x	7.62	8.01	
5	Nélson Carlos Ferreira	Brazil	7.77	7.62	x	x	x	x	7.77	
6	Maurice Wignall	Jamaica	x	7.42	x	x	x	7.73	7.73	
7	Dwight Phillips	United States	x	x	7.68	x	x	x	7.68	
8	Savanté Stringfellow	United States	x	7.67	7.27	x	7.54	7.60	7.67	
9	Lewis Asprilla	Colombia	x	7.03	7.35				7.35	
10	Devon Bean	Bermuda	x	7.27	7.22				7.27	
11	Michael McKoy	Belize	x	x	6.86				6.86	
	Chris Wright	Bahamas							DNS	
	Sherwin James	Dominica							DNS	
