= 1996 South American Junior Championships in Athletics =

XXVIII South American Junior Championships in Athletics
- Dates: June 8–10
- Host city: Bucaramanga, Colombia
- Level: Junior
- Events: 43
- Participation: about 283 athletes from 13 nations

The 28th South American Junior Championships in Athletics were held in Bucaramanga, Colombia from June 8–10, 1996.

== Participation (unofficial) ==
Detailed result lists can be found on the "World Junior Athletics History" website. An unofficial count yields the number of about 283 athletes from about 13 countries: Argentina (25), Bolivia (5), Brazil (66), Chile (31), Colombia (56), Ecuador (7), Guyana (4), Panama (24), Paraguay (1), Peru (12), Suriname (1), Uruguay (6), Venezuela (45).

== Medal summary ==
Medal winners are published for men and women Complete results can be found on the "World Junior Athletics History" website.

=== Men ===
Event	Gold		Silver		Bronze	
100 metres	Paulo Poersch (BRA)	10.2	John Mena (COL)	10.4	Heber Viera (URU)	10.5
200 metres	Paulo Poersch (BRA)	20.2w	Heber Viera (URU)	20.9w	Valmir da Silva (BRA)	21.4w
400 metres	Gustavo Aguirre (ARG)	48.3	André dos Santos (BRA)	48.4	Claudio Silva (VEN)	48.4
800 metres	Hudson de Souza (BRA)	1:50.8	Davi de Jesus (BRA)	1:51.8	Gustavo Aguirre (ARG)	1:52.4
1500 metres	Claudinei Vítor (BRA)	3:53.6	José da Silva (BRA)	3:55.9	José Luis Zapata (COL)	3:58.0
5000 metres	Ricardo Maestrello (BRA)	14:44.2	Marílson dos Santos (BRA)	14:48.3	Mauricio Ladino (COL)	14:54.9
10,000 metres	Mauricio Ladino (COL)	31:31.5	Paulo Lunkes (BRA)	31:32.1	Julio Cutipa (PER)	32:06.0
110 metres hurdles	Alexander Mena (COL)	14.6	Paulo Villar (COL)	14.8	Adriano de Oliveira (BRA)	15.2
400 metres hurdles	Alexander Mena (COL)	51.9	Cristiano Moura (BRA)	53.5	Robson dos Santos (BRA)	53.6
3000 metres steeplechase	Ramiro Nogueira (BRA)	9:20.5	Rogelio Fernández (URU)	9:21.5	Nelson González (COL)	9:26.3
4 × 100 metres relay	Brazil; Valmir da Silva; Adriano de Oliveira; Rodrigo Palladino; Paulo Poersch	40.3	Colombia; García; José Luis Herrera; Alexander Mena; John Mena	40.4	Argentina; Ivan Altamirano; Gustavo Aguirre; Gustavo Blanco; Martín Cortese	41.5
4 × 400 metres relay	Brazil; Wagner Pereira; Rogelio da Silva; André dos Santos; Paulo Poersch	3:10.6	Colombia; José Luis Herrera; Jhon Aguilar; John Mena; Alexander Mena	3:14.6	Venezuela; Johnny Lahoz; Luis Parra; Izaguirre; Claudio Silva	3:15.0
10,000 metres track walk	Omar Aguirre (ECU)	45:53.8	Rodrigo de Araújo (BRA)	46:06.7	José Marín (COL)	46:36.7
High jump	Alfredo Deza (PER)	2.12	Fabrício Romero (BRA)	2.12	Jorge Balliengo (ARG)	2.09
Pole vault	Waldo Martínez (ARG)	4.60	Gustavo Rehder (BRA)	4.50	Cristóbal Zegers (CHI)	4.45
Long jump	Cristián Antivilo (CHI)	7.30	Felipe Soto (COL)	7.04	Elton de Queiroz (BRA)	7.03
Triple jump	Marco dos Santos (BRA)	15.05	Jefferson Lopes (BRA)	15.04	José Reyes (VEN)	14.68
Shot put	Jhonny Rodríguez (COL)	16.17	Ronny Jiménez (VEN)	15.07	Marcelo Moreira (BRA)	14.47
Discus throw	Hernán Vázquez (ARG)	46.76	Andrés Calvo (ARG)	46.26	Julián Angulo (COL)	45.38
Hammer throw	Cristian Fernández (ARG)	51.98	Patricio Palma (CHI)	50.02	Juan Alviar (COL)	46.28
Javelin throw	Carlos Pérez (VEN)	61.88	John Mena (COL)	61.46	Cruz Gámez (VEN)	60.82
Decathlon	Santiago Lorenzo (ARG)	6352	Édson Bindilatti (BRA)	6255	Everaldo do Vasconcelos (BRA)	5977

=== Women ===
Event	Gold		Silver		Bronze	
100 metres	Paola Restrepo (COL)	11.7	Clara Córdoba (COL)	11.9	Aretusa Moreira (BRA)	12.0
200 metres	Onica Frazer (GUY)	24.2w	Clara Córdoba (COL)	24.5w	Paola Restrepo (COL)	24.7w
400 metres	Onica Frazer (GUY)	54.6	Juliana de Oliveira (BRA)	56.4	Norbelis Bracho (VEN)	56.8
800 metres	Andréa da Silva (BRA)	2:12.4	Susana Rebolledo (CHI)	2:12.9	Gloria Posso (COL)	2:13.3
1500 metres	Fabiana Cristine da Silva (BRA)	4:28.6	Bertha Sánchez (COL)	4:32.9	María Peralta (ARG)	4:40.3
3000 metres	Fabiana Cristine da Silva (BRA)	10:11.9	Bertha Sánchez (COL)	10:12.4	María Peralta (ARG)	10:18.2
10,000 metres	Valquíria dos Santos (BRA)	38:00.8	Norelis Lugo (VEN)	38:12.4	Isabel Boldo (BRA)	39:29.2
100 metres hurdles	Kelly Ribeiro de Oliveira (BRA)	14.3	Patrícia de Souza (BRA)	14.4	Cora Olivero (ARG)	14.7
400 metres hurdles	Rúbia dos Santos (BRA)	60.4	Silvana de Santana (BRA)	62.2	María Fernanda de Bastos (ARG)	64.0
4 × 100 metres relay	Colombia; Mary Vázquez; Clara Córdoba; Sandra Espinosa; Paola Restrepo	46.8	Brazil; Rosemar Neto; Juliana Pereira; Maria Almirão; Aretusa Moreira	47.4	Venezuela; Mackarly MacGregor; Fiorella Molina; Fabiola Escobar; Norbelis Bracho	48.5
4 × 400 metres relay	Brazil; Maria Almirão; Josiane Tito; Rúbia dos Santos; Silvana de Santana	3:45.2	Colombia; Sandra Espinosa; Paola Restrepo; Mary Vázquez; Gloria Posso	3:52.4	Chile; Carolina Matesic; Susana Rebolledo; Paula Osorio; Roxana González	3:53.6
5000 metres track walk	Sandra Zapata (COL)	25:21.9	Andreia Pedro (BRA)	25:25.6	Yesenia López (COL)	25:38.8
High jump	Glaucia da Silva (BRA)	1.77	Gisela Pfeiffer (ARG)	1.74	Delfina Blaquier (ARG)	1.68
Pole vault	Márcia Hennemann (BRA)	3.22	Mariela Laurora (ARG)	2.90	Jessica Freitas (BRA)	2.75
Long jump	Edilene Ferreira (BRA)	5.74w	Yorly Lasso (COL)	5.74	Vanina Bernardo (ARG)	5.69
Triple jump	Clara Córdoba (COL)	12.41	Viviane Anacleto (BRA)	12.37	Edilene Ferreira (BRA)	12.31w
Shot put	Katiuscia de Jesus (BRA)	14.01	Vânia Kolonko (BRA)	13.03	María Wals (ARG)	12.94
Discus throw	Fanny García (VEN)	43.96	Katiuscia de Jesus (BRA)	43.86	Neila Bombazaro (BRA)	41.42
Hammer throw	María Wals (ARG)	46.78	Katiuscia de Jesus (BRA)	44.22	Ana Milena (COL)	40.52
Javelin throw	Sabina Moya (COL)	54.34	Claudineia Barreto (BRA)	44.78	Márcia Vizzotto (BRA)	44.04
Heptathlon	Ellen Marinho (BRA)	4580	Gladibeth Morles (VEN)	4427	Carolina Torres (CHI)	4277

== Medal table (unofficial) ==
* Host nation (Colombia)

Rank	Nation	Gold	Silver	Bronze	Total
1	Brazil	21	21	12	54
2	Colombia*	9	12	10	31
3	Argentina	6	3	10	19
4	Venezuela	2	3	6	11
5	Guyana	2	0	0	2
6	Chile	1	2	3	6
7	Peru	1	0	1	2
8	Ecuador	1	0	0	1
9	Uruguay	0	2	1	3
Totals (9 entries)		43	43	43	129
