= Manuel Fuenmayor =

Venezuelan javelin thrower (born 1980)

Personal information
- Full name: Manuel José Fuenmayor Berra
- Born: December 3, 1980 (age 45)

Sport
- Country: Venezuela
- Sport: Men's Athletics
Medal record
Men's Athletics
Representing Venezuela
Bolivarian Games
Silver medal – second place	2005 Armenia	Javelin throw
Bronze medal – third place	2001 Ambato	Javelin throw

Manuel José Fuenmayor Berra (born 3 December 1980) is a Venezuelan former javelin thrower who competed in the 2004 Summer Olympics.

== Achievements ==
Year	Competition	Venue	Position	Notes
Representing Venezuela
1998	South American Junior Championships	Córdoba, Argentina	4th	59.41 m
1999	South American Championships	Bogotá, Colombia	9th	65.19 m
1999	Pan American Junior Championships	Tampa, United States	3rd	65.83 m
1999	South American Junior Championships	Concepción, Chile	2nd	63.17 m
2001	South American Championships	Manaus, Brazil	3rd	71.44 m
2001	Central American and Caribbean Championships	Guatemala City, Guatemala	1st	68.73 m
2001	Bolivarian Games	Ambato, Ecuador	3rd	72.38 m A
2002	Ibero-American Championships	Guatemala City, Guatemala	4th	70.15 m
2002	Central American and Caribbean Games	San Salvador, El Salvador	1st	75.32 m
2003	South American Championships	Barquisimeto, Venezuela	4th	75.42 m
2003	Central American and Caribbean Championships	St. George's, Grenada	1st	72.35 m
2003	Pan American Games	Santo Domingo, Dom. Rep.	5th	72.63 m
2004	Ibero-American Championships	Huelva, Spain	4th	73.81 m
2004	Olympic Games	Athens, Greece	30th (q)	72.26 m
2005	Bolivarian Games	Armenia, Colombia	2nd	72.93 m A
