= Athletics at the 2002 Central American and Caribbean Games =

Athletics at the XIX CAC Games
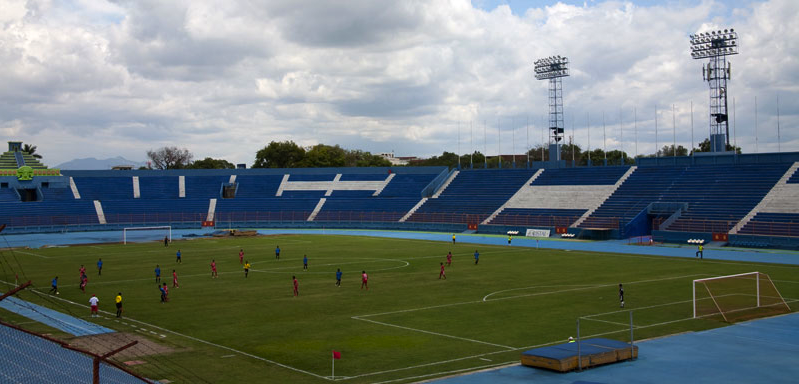
- Host stadium in San Salvador.
- Dates: 1–6 December 2002
- Host city: San Salvador (El Salvador)
- Venue: Estadio Nacional Flor Blanca
- Events: 43
- Participation: 282 athletes from 28 nations
- Records set: 6 Games records

The track and field competition at the 2002 Central American and Caribbean Games was held at the Estadio Nacional Flor Blanca in San Salvador, El Salvador, between 1 and 6 December 2002. Results were reported and discussed in detail on a day-by-day basis.

== Medal summary ==
Detailed results were published.

=== Men's events ===
Event	Gold		Silver		Bronze	
100 metres	Dion Crabbe; British Virgin Islands	10.28w	Jesús Carrión; Puerto Rico	10.32w	Rolando Blanco; Guatemala	10.34w
200 metres	Juan Pedro Toledo; Mexico	20.97	Christopher Williams; Jamaica	21.04	José Carabalí; Venezuela	21.13
400 metres	Carlos Santa; Dominican Republic	45.83	Lansford Spence; Jamaica	46.31	Juan Pedro Toledo; Mexico	46.79
800 metres	José Manuel González; Venezuela	1:48.71	Jermaine Myers; Jamaica	1:48.89	Marvin Watts; Jamaica	1:49.11
1500 metres	Juan Luis Barrios; Mexico	3:43.71	Alex Greaux; Puerto Rico	3:45.75	Michael Tomlin; Jamaica	3:49.33
5000 metres	Pablo Olmedo; Mexico	14:07.82	Freddy González; Venezuela	14:08.45	José David Galván; Mexico	14:11.95
10000 metres	Pablo Olmedo; Mexico	28:36.67	Teodoro Vega; Mexico	28:42.86	William Naranjo; Colombia	29:12.23
Marathon	Procopio Franco; Mexico	02:17:38	Luis Fonseca; Venezuela	02:20:13	Juan Carlos Cardona; Colombia	02:21:27
3000 metre steeplechase	Alex Greaux; Puerto Rico	8:42.39	Salvador Miranda; Mexico	8:48.18	Néstor Nieves; Venezuela	8:53.56
110 metres hurdles	Dudley Dorival; Haiti	13.82w	Paulo Villar; Colombia	13.94w	Ricardo Melbourne; Jamaica	14.02w
400 metres hurdles	Oscar Juanz; Mexico	50.46	Miguel García; Dominican Republic	51.05	Roberto Carvajal; Mexico	51.62
High jump	Gerardo Martínez; Mexico	2.18	Omar Camacho; Puerto Rico	2.15	Gilmar Mayo; Colombia	2.15
Pole vault	Dominic Johnson; Saint Lucia	5.41	Jorge Tienda; Mexico	5.00	Oscar Hernández; El Salvador	4.70
Long jump	Sergio Sauceda; Mexico	7.48	José Mercedes; Dominican Republic	7.32	Kevin Arthurton; Saint Kitts and Nevis	7.26
Triple jump	Alvin Rentería; Colombia	15.57	Jhonny Rodríguez; Venezuela	15.42	Wayne McSween; Grenada	15.12
Shot put	Yojer Medina; Venezuela	19.63	Manuel Repollet; Puerto Rico	16.93	José Ventura; Dominican Republic	16.46
Discus throw	Héctor Hurtado; Venezuela	55.43	Alfredo Romero; Puerto Rico	52.87	Yojer Medina; Venezuela	51.98
Hammer throw	Raúl Rivera; Guatemala	65.99	Santos Vega; Puerto Rico	65.35	Aldo Bello; Venezuela	65.35
Javelin throw	Manuel Fuenmayor; Venezuela	75.32	Noraldo Palacios; Colombia	75.11	Ronald Noguera; Venezuela	74.91
20 kilometre road walk	Alejandro López; Mexico	1:26:32	Luis Fernando García; Guatemala	1:27:51	Fredy Hernández; Colombia	1:28:48
4 × 100 metres relay	Dominican Republic; Leonardo Matos; Juan Sainfleur; Luis Morillo; Yoel Báez	39.41	Venezuela; Juan Morillo; José Carabalí; William Hernández; Hely Ollarves	39.87	Trinidad and Tobago; Alvin Henry; Shane Dyer; Andre Brown; Dion Rodriguez	40.08
4 × 400 metres relay	Dominican Republic; Leonardo Matos; Gerardo Peralta; Carlos Santa; Felix Sánchez	3:04.15	Jamaica; Germaine Myers; Michael McDonald; Christopher Williams; Lansford Spence	3:05.40	Venezuela; Danny Núñez; Jonathan Palma; Luis Luna; William Hernández	3:05.71

=== Women's events ===
Event	Gold		Silver		Bronze	
100 metres	Liliana Allen; Mexico	11.34w	Heather Samuel; Antigua and Barbuda	11.44w	Melocia Clarke; Jamaica	11.57w
200 metres	Liliana Allen; Mexico	23.34	Norma González; Colombia	23.73	Heather Samuel; Antigua and Barbuda	24.13
400 metres^{†}	Ana Guevara; Mexico	51.87	Eliana Pacheco; Venezuela	53.18	Clara Hernández; Dominican Republic	53.81
800 metres	Letitia Vriesde; Suriname	2:04.50	Lizaira Del Valle; Puerto Rico	2:06.09	Gabriela Medina; Mexico	2:06.55
1500 metres	Dulce Rodríguez; Mexico	4:18.91	Korene Hinds; Jamaica	4:22.03	Bertha Sánchez; Colombia	4:27.75
5000 metres	Dulce Rodríguez; Mexico	16:38.92	Bertha Sánchez; Colombia	16:39.23	Nora Rocha; Mexico	16:42.18
Marathon	Isabel Orellana; Mexico	2:54:14	Paola Cabrera; Mexico	2:56:05	Lourdes Cruz; Puerto Rico	2:59:46
100 metres hurdles	Dionne Rose-Henley; Jamaica	13.67	Princesa Oliveros; Colombia	13.72	Nadine Faustin; Haiti	13.84
400 metres hurdles	Yvonne Harrison; Puerto Rico	57.39	Yamelis Ortiz; Puerto Rico	57.52	Princesa Oliveros; Colombia	57.72
High jump	Juana Arrendel; Dominican Republic	1.97	Romary Rifka; Mexico	1.85	Caterine Ibargüen; Colombia	1.79
Pole vault	Milena Agudelo; Colombia	3.90	Alejandra Meza; Mexico	3.80	Andrea Zambrana; Puerto Rico	3.80
Long jump	María Espencer; Dominican Republic	6.20	Yuridia Bustamante; Mexico	6.11	Yesenia Rivera; Puerto Rico	6.03
Triple jump	María Espencer; Dominican Republic	13.57	Caterine Ibargüen; Colombia	13.17	Jennifer Arveláez; Venezuela	13.10
Shot put	Fior Vásquez; Dominican Republic	17.04	Luz Dary Castro; Colombia	15.98	Isabella Charles; Dominica	12.84
Discus throw	Luz Dary Castro; Colombia	55.11	Flor Acosta; Mexico	48.12	Ana Lucía Espinoza; Guatemala	46.61
Hammer throw	Amarilys Alméstica; Puerto Rico	60.39	Violeta Guzmán; Mexico	58.48	Nancy Guillén; El Salvador	57.10
Javelin throw	Zuleima Araméndiz; Colombia	56.63	Sabina Moya; Colombia	55.73	Nereida Ríos; Mexico	46.51
Heptathlon	Francia Manzanillo; Dominican Republic	5279	Yudith Méndez; Dominican Republic	5261	Nyota Peters; Guyana	4657
20 kilometre road walk	Victoria Palacios; Mexico	1:36:16	Rosario Sánchez; Mexico	1:36:44	Teresita Collado; Guatemala	1:42:07
4 × 100 metres relay^{†}	Colombia; Digna Murillo; Melisa Murillo; Mirtha Brock; Princesa Oliveros	45.34	El Salvador; Marcela Navarro; Karla Hernández; Verónica Quijano; Aura Amaya	46.95	Jamaica; Melocia Clarke; Dionne Rose-Henley; Jenice Daley; Winsome Howell	50.62
4 × 400 metres relay^{†}	Mexico; America Rangel; Magaly Yánez; Gabriela Medina; Ana Guevara	3:31.24	Puerto Rico; Beatriz Cruz; Sandra Moya; Yamelis Ortiz; Militza Castro	3:35.94	Venezuela; Yusmelis García; Ángela Alfonso; Yenny Mejías; Eliana Pacheco	3:37.86

^{†}: Lorena de la Rosa from the Dominican Republic was tested positive for nandrolone, she and here teams were disqualified. Initially, she was 2nd in the 400m event (53.09s), 1st as member of the 4 × 100m relay team (44.90s), and 2nd as member of the 4 × 400m relay team (3:32.88min).

== Medal table ==
Rank	Nation	Gold	Silver	Bronze	Total
1	Mexico	17	10	6	33
2	Dominican Republic	8	3	2	13
3	Colombia	5	8	7	20
4	Venezuela (VEN)	4	5	8	17
5	Puerto Rico	3	9	3	15
6	Jamaica	1	5	5	11
7	Guatemala	1	1	3	5
8	Haiti	1	0	1	2
9	British Virgin Islands	1	0	0	1
9	Saint Lucia	1	0	0	1
9	Suriname	1	0	0	1
12	El Salvador	0	1	2	3
13	Antigua and Barbuda	0	1	1	2
14	Dominica	0	0	1	1
14	Grenada	0	0	1	1
14	Guyana	0	0	1	1
14	Saint Kitts and Nevis	0	0	1	1
14	Trinidad and Tobago	0	0	1	1
Totals (18 entries)		43	43	43	129

== Participation ==
According to an unofficial count, 282 athletes from 28 countries participated.

- Antigua and Barbuda (2)
- Bahamas (5)
- Barbados (8)
- Belize (2)
- British Virgin Islands (3)
- Cayman Islands (2)
- Colombia (23)
- Dominica (2)
- Dominican Republic (25)
- El Salvador (26)
- Grenada (5)
- Guatemala (23)
- Guyana (1)
- Haiti (8)
- Honduras (1)
- Jamaica (20)
- Mexico (53)
- Netherlands Antilles (5)
- Nicaragua (4)
- Panama (1)
- Puerto Rico (22)
- Saint Kitts and Nevis (4)
- Saint Lucia (1)
- Saint Vincent and the Grenadines (1)
- Suriname (1)
- Trinidad and Tobago (5)
- U.S. Virgin Islands (5)
- Venezuela (24)
