= William Naranjo =

Colombian long-distance runner

Personal information
- Full name: William de Jesús Naranjo Jaramillo
- Born: 18 August 1978 (age 48) Riosucio, Caldas, Colombia

Sport
- Country: Colombia
- Sport: Men's Athletics
Medal record
Men's Athletics
Representing Colombia
South American Championships
Bronze medal – third place	2013 Cartagena	10,000 m
Bolivarian Games
Silver medal – second place	2001 Ambato	5,000 m
Silver medal – second place	2009 Sucre	10,000 m
Bronze medal – third place	2009 Sucre	5,000 m

William de Jesús Naranjo Jaramillo (born 18 August 1978 in Riosucio, Caldas) is a male long-distance runner from Colombia, who twice represented his native country at the Pan American Games (2003 and 2007). He set his personal best in the men's 5,000 metres (13:22.30) on 3 July 2004 in San Sebastián.

He is a two-time South American Cross Country Champion, having won in both 2005 and 2007.

== Achievements ==
Year	Tournament	Venue	Result	Event	Notes
Representing Colombia
2001	Bolivarian Games	Ambato, Ecuador	2nd	5,000 m	14:52.26 A
2002	Central American and Caribbean Games	San Salvador, El Salvador	4th	5000m	14:13.69
2002	Central American and Caribbean Games	San Salvador, El Salvador	3rd	10,000 m	29:12.23
2003	South American Championships	Barquisimeto, Venezuela	2nd	5,000 m	14:03.41
2003	South American Championships	Barquisimeto, Venezuela	1st	10,000 m	29:37.38
2003	Pan American Games	Santo Domingo, Dominican Republic	7th	5,000 m	14:25.70
2003	Pan American Games	Santo Domingo, Dominican Republic	6th	10,000 m	30:13.26
2005	World Cross Country Championships	Saint-Étienne, France	111th	Long Race	40:22
2007	World Cross Country Championships	Mombasa, Kenya	35th	Long Race	
2007	Pan American Games	Rio de Janeiro, Brazil	7th	5,000 m	13:56.45
2007	Pan American Games	Rio de Janeiro, Brazil	7th	10,000 m	29:13.93
2007	South American Championships	São Paulo, Brazil	3rd	5,000 m	13:56.99
2008	Central American and Caribbean Championships	Cali, Colombia	1st	10,000 m	29:30.29
2009	Bolivarian Games	Sucre, Bolivia	3rd	5,000 m	15:10.4 A
2009	Bolivarian Games	Sucre, Bolivia	2nd	10,000 m	31:18.45 A
