= Noraldo Palacios =

Colombian javelin thrower (born 1980)

Personal information
- Full name: Noraldo Palacios Rivas
- Born: July 8, 1980 (age 45) Turbo, Antioquia, Colombia

Sport
- Country: Colombia
- Sport: Men's Athletics
Medal record
Men's Athletics
Representing Colombia
Bolivarian Games
Gold medal – first place	2001 Ambato	Javelin throw
Gold medal – first place	2005 Armenia	Javelin throw
Silver medal – second place	2009 Sucre	Javelin throw

Noraldo Palacios Rivas (born 8 July 1980 in Turbo, Antioquia) is a Colombian javelin thrower. His personal best throw is 79.61 m, achieved in Bogotá 24 May 2009.

He won bronze medals at the 2005 South American Championships and the 2006 Central American and Caribbean Games, and silver medals at the 2002 Central American and Caribbean Games and the 2003 South American Championships.

In 2009 he was found guilty of betamethasone doping. The sample was delivered on 22 May 2008 in an in-of-competition test in São Paulo. He received a suspension from June 2008 to December 2008.

== Achievements ==
Year	Competition	Venue	Position	Event	Notes
Representing Colombia
2001	Bolivarian Games	Ambato, Ecuador	1st	Javelin	73.40 m A
2002	Central American and Caribbean Games	San Salvador, El Salvador	2nd	Javelin	75.11 m
2003	Pan American Games	Santo Domingo, Dominican Republic	9th	Javelin	69.09 m
2003	South American Championships	Barquisimeto, Venezuela	2nd	Javelin	76.81 m
2005	South American Championships	Cali, Colombia	3rd	Javelin	73.54 m
2005	Bolivarian Games	Armenia, Colombia	1st	Javelin	77.37 m GR A
2006	Central American and Caribbean Games	Cartagena, Colombia	3rd	Javelin	74.10 m
2006	South American Championships	Tunja, Colombia	1st	Javelin	79.09 m
2007	Pan American Games	Rio de Janeiro, Brazil	5th	Javelin	71.14 m
2008	Ibero-American Championships	Iquique, Chile	2nd	Javelin	77.20 m
2009	South American Championships	Lima, Peru	2nd	Javelin	77.87 m
2009	Bolivarian Games	Sucre, Bolivia	2nd	Javelin	71.64 m A
