= Gilmar Mayo =

Colombian high jumper (born 1969)

Personal information
- Full name: Gilmar Jalith Mayo Lozano
- Nationality: Colombian
- Born: September 30, 1969 (age 56) Pailitas, Cesar, Colombia

Sport
- Country: Colombia
- Sport: Athletics
- Events: High jump; Long jump; Triple jump
Medal record
Representing Colombia
Men's athletics
South American Games
Gold medal – first place	1994 Valencia	High jump
Gold medal – first place	1998 Cuenca	Triple jump
Gold medal – first place	1998 Cuenca	High jump
Silver medal – second place	1998 Cuenca	Long jump
Bolivarian Games
Gold medal – first place	1993 Cochabamba	High jump
Gold medal – first place	2001 Ambato	High jump
Gold medal – first place	2005 Armenia	High jump

Gilmar Jalith Mayo Lozano (born 30 September 1969) is a Colombian high jumper. His personal best jump is 2.33 m (7 ft 7 1/2 in), achieved in October 1994 in Pereira. This is the current Colombian and South American record. Mayo represented Colombia twice at the Olympic Games (1996 and 2000) and three times at the World Athletics Championships (1995, 1997 and 1999).

Mayo was the 2006 Central American and Caribbean Games champion in the high jump and competed at the Pan American Games in 1991, 1995, 1999 and 2007, which included a bronze on his second appearance at the competition. He was a four-time champion at the South American Championships in Athletics (1991, 1995, 1997, 2005) and a three-time gold medallist at the South American Games – this includes the 1998 South American Games where he also won the triple jump title and the long jump silver medal. His mark of 2.25 m (7 ft 4 1/2 in) at the 1994 South American Games is the current Games record. He was a frequent participant at the Ibero-American Championships in Athletics and was the gold medallist there in 2000 and 2002.

== International competitions ==
Year	Competition	Venue	Position	Event	Notes
Representing Colombia
1987	South American Junior Championships	Santiago, Chile	7th	High jump	1.75 m
1987	South American Junior Championships	Santiago, Chile	8th	Long jump	6.64 m
1987	South American Junior Championships	Santiago, Chile	6th	Triple jump	14.76 m
1988	South American Junior Championships	Cubatão, Brazil	9th	High jump	1.95 m
1988	South American Junior Championships	Cubatão, Brazil	8th	Long jump	6.47 m
1988	South American Junior Championships	Cubatão, Brazil	4th	Triple jump	14.79 m
1989	South American Championships	Medellín, Colombia	6th	Triple jump	15.94 m
1991	South American Championships	Manaus, Brazil	1st	High jump	2.20 m CR
1991	Pan American Games	Havana, Cuba	11th	High jump	2.10 m
1993	Bolivarian Games	Cochabamba, Bolivia	1st	High jump	2.20 m A
1993	South American Championships	Lima, Peru	4th	High jump	2.13 m
1993	Central American and Caribbean Games	Ponce, Puerto Rico	4th	High jump	2.14 m
1994	Ibero-American Championships	Mar del Plata, Argentina	1st	High jump	2.32 m
1994	South American Games	Valencia, Venezuela	1st	High jump	2.25 m
1995	World Indoor Championships	Barcelona, Spain	10th	High jump	2.24 m
1995	Pan American Games	Mar del Plata, Argentina	3rd	High jump	2.26 m
1995	South American Championships	Manaus, Brazil	1st	High jump	2.25 m CR
1995	World Championships	Gothenburg, Sweden	17th (q)	High jump	2.24 m
1996	Ibero-American Championships	Medellín, Colombia	2nd	High jump	2.23 m
1996	Olympic Games	Atlanta, United States	21st (q)	High jump	2.26 m
1997	South American Championships	Mar del Plata, Argentina	1st	High jump	2.26 m CR
1997	Central American and Caribbean Championships	San Juan, Puerto Rico	1st	High jump	2.25 m
1997	World Championships	Athens, Greece	10th	High jump	2.29 m
1998	Ibero-American Championships	Lisbon, Portugal	3rd	High jump	2.18 m
1998	Central American and Caribbean Games	Maracaibo, Venezuela	2nd	High jump	2.30 m
1998	South American Games	Cuenca, Ecuador	1st	4 × 100 m	47.42 s A
1998	South American Games	Cuenca, Ecuador	1st	High jump	2.24 m A
1998	South American Games	Cuenca, Ecuador	2nd	Long jump	7.29 m
1998	South American Games	Cuenca, Ecuador	1st	Triple jump	15.78 m A
1999	South American Championships	Bogotá, Colombia	2nd	High jump	2.26 m A =CR
1999	Pan American Games	Winnipeg, Canada	5th	High jump	2.20 m
1999	World Championships	Seville, Spain	19th (q)	High jump	2.23 m
2000	Ibero-American Championships	Rio de Janeiro, Brazil	1st	High jump	2.24 m
2000	Olympic Games	Sydney, Australia	23rd (q)	High jump	2.20 m
2001	World Championships	Edmonton, Canada	11th	High jump	2.20 m
2001	Bolivarian Games	Ambato, Ecuador	1st	High jump	2.23 m A
2002	Ibero-American Championships	Guatemala City, Guatemala	1st	High jump	2.26 m
2002	Central American and Caribbean Games	San Salvador, El Salvador	3rd	High jump	2.15 m
2005	South American Championships	Cali, Colombia	1st	High jump	2.22 m
2005	Bolivarian Games	Armenia, Colombia	1st	High jump	2.26 m GR A
2006	Ibero-American Championships	Ponce, Puerto Rico	2nd	High jump	2.20 m
2006	Central American and Caribbean Games	Cartagena, Colombia	1st	High jump	2.19 m
2006	South American Championships	Tunja, Colombia	2nd	High jump	2.20 m
2007	Pan American Games	Rio de Janeiro, Brazil	13th	High jump	2.10 m
2007	South American Championships	São Paulo, Brazil	3rd	High jump	2.21 m
2008	Ibero-American Championships	Iquique, Chile	5th	High jump	2.15 m
2008	Central American and Caribbean Championships	Cali, Colombia	5th	High jump	2.10 m
