= Lewis Asprilla =

Colombian long jumper

Lewis Kohler Asprilla
Personal information
- Nationality: Colombian
- Born: May 17, 1972 (age 54)
- Occupation: Metodologo

Sport
- Country: Colombia
- Sport: Athletics
- Event: Long jump
- League: Valle del Cauca
- Club: Indervalle
- Retired: 2012

Achievements and titles
- Personal best: 7.96m
- Updated on 15 August 2016

Lewis Kohler Asprilla (born 17 May 1972) is a retired Colombian athlete who specialised in the long jump. He won several medals on regional level.

His personal best jump is 7.96 metres, set in 1999 in Bogotá. This is the current national record.

== Competition record ==
Year	Competition	Venue	Position	Event	Notes
Representing Colombia
1990	South American Junior Championships	Bogotá, Colombia	3rd	High jump	2.01 m
1990	South American Junior Championships	Bogotá, Colombia	5th	Long jump	6.96 m
1991	South American Junior Championships	Asunción, Paraguay	5th	High jump	1.96 m
1991	South American Junior Championships	Asunción, Paraguay	3rd	Long jump	6.82 m
1996	Ibero-American Championships	Medellín, Colombia	8th	Long jump	7.63 m (w)
1998	Ibero-American Championships	Lisbon, Portugal	3rd	Long jump	7.88 m
1998	Central American and Caribbean Games	Maracaibo, Venezuela	9th	Long jump	7.23 m
1999	South American Championships	Bogotá, Colombia	1st	Long jump	7.96 m
1999	Pan American Games	Winnipeg, Canada	9th	Long jump	7.35 m
2001	South American Championships	Manaus, Brazil	2nd	Long jump	7.48 m (w)
2001	Bolivarian Games	Ambato, Ecuador	3rd	Long jump	7.38 m (w)
