= Milena Agudelo =

Colombian pole vaulter

Milena Jazmin Agudelo Medina (born 15 April 1985) is a Colombian athlete specializing in the pole vault. She is a multiple South American and CAC medalist. Her personal best jump is 4.21 metres from 2005 which is the current national record.

== Competition record ==
| Year | Competition | Venue | Position | Event | Notes |
Representing Colombia
| 2000 | South American Youth Championships | Bogotá, Colombia | 4th | Pole vault | 3.50 m |
| 2001 | World Youth Championships | Debrecen, Hungary | 20th (q) | Pole vault | 3.20 m |
| 2001 | South American Junior Championships | Santa Fe, Argentina | 6th | Pole vault | 3.40 m |
| 2001 | Pan American Junior Championships | Santa Fe, Argentina | 10th | Pole vault | 3.20 m |
| 2002 | South American Youth Championships | Asunción, Paraguay | 1st | Pole vault | 3.90 m |
| 2002 | Central American and Caribbean Games | San Salvador, El Salvador | 1st | Pole vault | 3.90 m |
| 2003 | South American Junior Championships | Guayaquil, Ecuador | 2nd | Pole vault | 3.80 m |
| 2003 | South American Championships | Barquisimeto, Venezuela | 3rd | Pole vault | 4.00 m |
| 2003 | Pan American Junior Championships | Bridgetown, Barbados | 5th | Pole vault | 3.80 m |
| 2004 | South American U23 Championships | Barquisimeto, Venezuela | 1st | Pole vault | 3.90 m |
| 2004 | World Junior Championships | Grosseto, Italy | — | Pole vault | NH |
| 2004 | Ibero-American Championships | Huelva, Spain | 3rd | Pole vault | 4.20 m |
| 2005 | South American Championships | Cali, Colombia | 3rd | Pole vault | 4.00 m |
| 2006 | Central American and Caribbean Games | Cartagena, Colombia | 4th | Pole vault | 3.85 m |
| 2006 | South American Championships | Tunja, Colombia | 5th | Pole vault | 3.90 m |
| 2006 | South American U23 Championships / South American Games | Buenos Aires, Argentina | 2nd | Pole vault | 4.10 m |
| 2008 | Central American and Caribbean Championships | Cali, Colombia | 1st | Pole vault | 4.10 m |
| 2008 | Ibero-American Championships | Iquique, Chile | – | Pole vault | NM |
| 2009 | South American Championships | Lima, Peru | 5th | Pole vault | 4.00 m |
| 2010 | Central American and Caribbean Games | Mayagüez, Puerto Rico | 3rd | Pole vault | 3.90 m |
| 2011 | South American Championships | Buenos Aires, Argentina | 3rd | Pole vault | 3.90 m |
| 2011 | Central American and Caribbean Championships | Mayagüez, Puerto Rico | 2nd | Pole vault | 3.95 m |
| 2013 | South American Championships | Cartagena, Colombia | 3rd | Pole vault | 3.90 m |
| 2017 | Bolivarian Games | Santa Marta, Colombia | 4th | Pole vault | 3.70 m |
