= Rolando Ortiz =

Colombian mountain runner

Personal information
- Full name: Rolando Gabriel Ortiz Celis
- Nationality: Colombian
- Born: 20 February 1970 (age 56)

Sport
- Country: Colombia
- Sport: Mountain running

Rolando Ortiz (born 20 February 1970) is a former Colombian mountain runner who won one World Mountain Running Championships (2006).
