= Sonia Calizaya =

Bolivian marathon runner

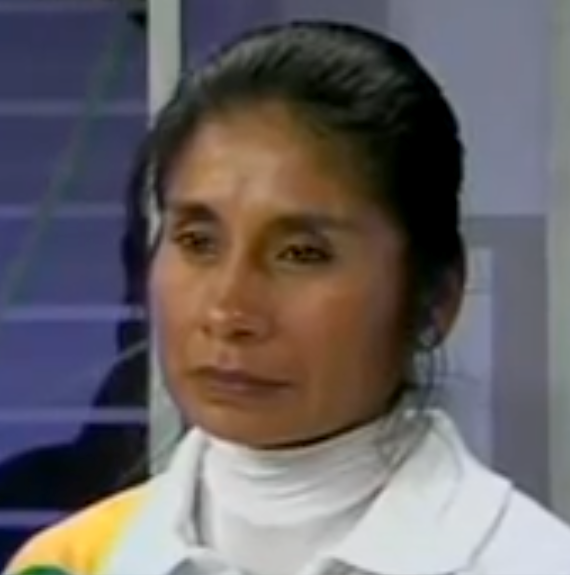
- In a 2016 interview

Personal information
- Full name: Sonia Calizaya Huanca
- Nationality: Bolivia
- Born: 20 February 1976 (age 50) La Paz, Bolivia
- Height: 1.51 m (4 ft 11 1/2 in)
- Weight: 43 kg (95 lb)

Sport
- Sport: Athletics
- Event: Marathon

Achievements and titles
- Personal bests: Half-marathon: 1:17:34 (2004); Marathon: 2:45:05 (2007)

Sonia Calizaya Huanca (born 20 February 1976, in La Paz) is a Bolivian marathon runner. She set both a national record and a personal best time of 2:45:05 at the 2007 Buenos Aires Marathon.

Calizaya represented Bolivia at the 2008 Summer Olympics in Beijing, where she competed for the women's marathon. She successfully finished the race in fifty-ninth place by nearly a second behind Greece's Eleni Donta, with a time of 2:45:53.
