= Alvin Rentería =

Colombian triple jumper

Albin Rentería
Personal information
- Full name: Albin Heider Rentería Montoya
- Born: 4 January 1978 (age 48)

Sport
- Country: Colombia
- Sport: Men's Athletics
Medal record
Representing Colombia
Bolivarian Games
| Silver medal – second place | 2001 Ambato | Triple jump |
Central American and Caribbean Games
| Gold medal – first place | 2002 San Salvador | Triple jump |

Albin Heider Rentería Montoya (born 4 January 1978) is a male triple jumper from Colombia. Rentería set his personal best (16.66 metres) in the men's triple jump on 15 September 2001 in Ambato. He is a four-time national champion in the men's triple jump event, and also won a long jump title in 2000.

He won the triple jump bronze medal at the 1997 South American Junior Championships in Athletics. At the turn of the decade he stepped into the senior ranks and won a silver medal at the 2001 Bolivarian Games. He followed this up by winning the triple jump gold medal at the 2002 Central American and Caribbean Games.

== Achievements ==
| Year | Competition | Venue | Position | Event | Notes |
Representing Colombia
| 2001 | Bolivarian Games | Ambato, Ecuador | 2nd | Triple jump | 16.66m A |
| 2002 | Central American and Caribbean Games | San Salvador, El Salvador | 1st | Triple jump | 15.57m (wind: -1.1 m/s) |
