= Princesa Oliveros =

Colombian track and field athlete (born 1975)

Personal information
- Full name: María Princesa Oliveros Bohórquez
- Born: 10 August 1975 (age 50) Luruaco, Atlántico, Colombia
- Height: 1.68 m (5 ft 6 in)
- Weight: 56 kg (123 lb)

Sport
- Country: Colombia
- Sport: Women's Athletics
Medal record
Pan American Games
Gold medal – first place	2011 Guadalajara	400 m hurdles
Bronze medal – third place	2011 Guadalajara	4×400 m relay
CAC Games
Silver medal – second place	2002 San Salvador	100 m hurdles
Bronze medal – third place	2002 San Salvador	400 m hurdles
Bolivarian Games
Gold medal – first place	1997 Arequipa	100 m hurdles
Gold medal – first place	1997 Arequipa	400 m hurdles
Gold medal – first place	1997 Arequipa	4x400 m relay
Gold medal – first place	2001 Ambato	100 m hurdles
Gold medal – first place	2001 Ambato	400 m hurdles
Gold medal – first place	2001 Ambato	4x400 m relay
Silver medal – second place	2005 Armenia	100 m hurdles
Silver medal – second place	2005 Armenia	400 m hurdles
Silver medal – second place	2009 Sucre	400 m hurdles
CAC Championships
Silver medal – second place	2008 Cali	400 m hurdles
South American Championships
Silver medal – second place	2001 Manaus	400 m hurdles
Silver medal – second place	2005 Cali	4×400 m relay
Silver medal – second place	2006 Tunja	100 m hurdles
Silver medal – second place	2011 Buenos Aires	400 m hurdles
Silver medal – second place	2011 Buenos Aires	4×400 m relay
Bronze medal – third place	1999 Bogotá	100 m hurdles
Bronze medal – third place	1999 Bogotá	400 m hurdles
Bronze medal – third place	2003 Barquisimeto	100 m hurdles
Bronze medal – third place	2003 Barquisimeto	400 m hurdles
Bronze medal – third place	2009 Lima	400 m hurdles

María Princesa Oliveros Bohórquez (born 10 August 1975) is a Colombian track and field athlete who competes in the 100 metres hurdles and 400 metres hurdles events. Her personal bests are 13.41 seconds and 56.26 seconds, respectively. She was the gold medallist in the 400 m hurdles at the 2011 Pan American Games, at which she also won a 4×400 metres relay bronze medal in a Colombian record time.

She has won numerous hurdles medals at the South American Championships in Athletics and has reached the podium at the competition in seven different years (from 1999 to 2011, with the exception of 2007). At regional level, she has been a hurdles medallist at the Central American and Caribbean Championships and CAC Games, as well as being a six-time champion at the Bolivarian Games.

== Career ==
=== Early life ===
Born in Luruaco, Atlántico Department and raised in Turbo, Antioquia, she initially took an interest in volleyball. She showed an aptitude for hurdling at an inter-school meeting in 1991, but remained more interested in the ball game and represented her municipality in the sport. By the time she went to university, however, she had not grown tall enough to be a professional volleyball player and decided to use her athletic speed for the 400 m hurdles instead. Having come from a poor family, her mother encouraged her to focus on her science studies rather than sport, but Oliveros combined the two as a student-athlete and she developed into a regional-class hurdler.

Oliveros won her first national title in the 100 metres hurdles in 1997 and won her first international medals soon after, taking both the 100 and 400 m hurdles titles as well as the 4×400 metres relay title at the 1997 Bolivarian Games. At the 1999 South American Championships in Athletics n the Colombian capital of Bogotá she won bronze medals in both the hurdles events. She won the 400 m hurdles silver medal at the 2001 edition of the competition, but just missed out on the 100 m hurdles medal by coming fourth. She headed overseas for the 2001 Summer Universiade in Beijing and was a double semi-finalist in the hurdles (including personal bests of 13.46 seconds and 57.19 seconds for the events). She ended the year by retaining all three of her titles at the 2001 Bolivarian Games.

=== Regional hurdles medals ===
She had a national winning streak in the hurdles, winning both events three times in succession from 2002 to 2004, then again in 2006. The 2002 season saw her win further international medals in the hurdles: she won 400 m silver and 100 m bronze at the 2002 Ibero-American Championships in Athletics, then reversed those placings for two more medals at the 2002 Central American and Caribbean Games. She was a double bronze medallist at the 2003 South American Championships in Athletics and also competed in the heats at the 2003 Pan American Games. A 100 m hurdles bronze at the 2004 Ibero-American Championships in Athletics was her sole highlight in the following year.

In 2005, she was the 100 m hurdles runner-up at the South American Championships, where she was fourth in the longer race. In her third consecutive appearance at the 2005 Bolivarian Games, she missed out on defending her hurdles titles as fellow Colombian Brigith Merlano beat her in the 100 m final while Ecuador's Lucy Jaramillo edged her into second place in the 400 m hurdles. Oliveros had a trio of fifth places in the hurdles and relay events at the 2006 CAC Games. She was fifth again in the 400 m at the 2006 South American Championships, although she left that competition with a silver medal from the 4×400 m relay.

=== Pan American gold medal ===
After a low-key 2007, the 32-year-old Oliveros ran her fastest 400 m hurdles time in almost five years to claim the silver medal 2008 CAC Championships in Cali, Colombia with a run of 57.44 seconds. She also helped the relay team to fourth place in the final. She began to increasingly focus on the 400 m hurdles at championship events and (following two doping disqualifications) she won a bronze medal at the 2009 South American Championships and a silver at the 2009 Bolivarian Games later that year. In 2010, she competed sparingly, but managed to win the Colombian 400 m hurdles title.

At the age of 35, Oliveros reached the form of her life in the 2011 season. In Medellín she ran a 100 m hurdles best of 13.41 seconds on 30 April, then ran 57.43 seconds for the 400 m hurdles the following day (the third best run of her career at that point). She was twice runner-up to Brazil's Jailma de Lima at the 2011 South American Championships, first in the 400 m hurdles and then in the 400 m relay. A month later she was a 400 m hurdles finalist at the 2011 CAC Championships, coming sixth in the competition. She won the first major title of her career at the 2011 Pan American Games: running at altitude in Guadalajara, she improved her personal best by almost a second to take the 400 m hurdles gold medal in a time of 56.26 seconds. She then teamed up with Norma González, Evelis Aguilar and (400 m winner) Jennifer Padilla for the 4×400 m relay and the Colombians received the bronze medal with a Colombian national record time of 3:29.94 minutes.

== Achievements ==
Year	Competition	Venue	Position	Event	Notes
Representing Colombia
1997	Bolivarian Games	Arequipa, Peru	1st	100 m hurdles	13.94 (wind: 0.0 m/s) A
1997	Bolivarian Games	Arequipa, Peru	1st	400 m hurdles	59.65 A
1997	Bolivarian Games	Arequipa, Peru	1st	4 × 400 m relay	3:44.76 A
2001	Bolivarian Games	Ambato, Ecuador	1st	100 m hurdles	13.0 A
2001	Bolivarian Games	Ambato, Ecuador	1st	400 m hurdles	58.21 A
2001	Bolivarian Games	Ambato, Ecuador	1st	4 × 400 m relay	3:36.32 A
2002	Central American and Caribbean Games	San Salvador, El Salvador	2nd	100m hurdles	13.72 (wind: 1.1 m/s)
2002	Central American and Caribbean Games	San Salvador, El Salvador	3rd	400m hurdles	57.72
2002	Central American and Caribbean Games	San Salvador, El Salvador	1st	4 × 100 m relay	45.34
2005	Bolivarian Games	Armenia, Colombia	2nd	100 m hurdles	13.71 (wind: -1.2 m/s) A
2005	Bolivarian Games	Armenia, Colombia	2nd	400 m hurdles	58.35 A
2009	Bolivarian Games	Sucre, Bolivia	2nd	400 m hurdles	58.12 A
