= Jimmy Pino =

Columbian sprinter (born 1978)

Personal information
- Full name: Jimmy José Pino Zarza
- Born: August 12, 1978 (age 48) Cartagena, Colombia
- Height: 1.80 m (5 ft 11 in)
- Weight: 80 kg (176 lb)

Sport
- Country: Colombia
- Sport: Athletics
- Event: 200m

Achievements and titles
- Olympic finals: Heats (2000)
- Personal best: 20.5 (2002)
- Updated on 24 May 2016

Jimmy José Pino Zarza (born 12 August 1978) is a former Colombian sprinter who competed in the men's 200m at the 2000 Summer Olympics. He recorded a 21.42, good for 6th in his heat, but not enough to advance. His personal best in the 200m is 20.5, recorded in 2002.
