= Josiane Soares =

Brazilian hammer thrower

Personal information
- Born: 21 June 1976 (age 49) Blumenau, Brazil

Sport
- Sport: Track and field

Josiane Soares (born 21 June 1976) is a Brazilian athlete specialising in the hammer throw. She won several medals at regional level. Her personal best in the event is 63.86 metres set in Tunja in 2006.

== Competition record ==
Year	Competition	Venue	Position	Event	Notes
Representing Brazil
1992	South American Youth Championships	Santiago, Chile	3rd	Shot put	11.59 m
1994	South American Junior Championships	Santa Fe, Argentina	1st	Shot put	13.63 m
1994	South American Junior Championships	Santa Fe, Argentina	5th	Discus throw	38.08 m
1995	Pan American Junior Championships	Santiago, Chile	3rd	Shot put	13.98 m
1995	Pan American Junior Championships	Santiago, Chile	10th	Hammer throw	37.52 m
1995	Pan American Junior Championships	Santiago, Chile	2nd	Hammer throw	45.40 m
1995	South American Junior Championships	Santiago, Chile	1st	Shot put	13.95 m
1995	South American Junior Championships	Santiago, Chile	7th	Discus throw	38.20 m
1995	South American Junior Championships	Santiago, Chile	1st	Hammer throw	43.78 m
1997	South American Championships	Mar del Plata, Argentina	5th	Hammer throw	48.48 m
1998	Ibero-American Championships	Lisbon, Portugal	–	Hammer throw	NM
1999	South American Championships	Bogotá, Colombia	3rd	Hammer throw	57.23 m
2000	Ibero-American Championships	Rio de Janeiro, Brazil	5th	Hammer throw	56.25 m
2001	South American Championships	Manaus, Brazil	2nd	Hammer throw	58.81 m
2002	Ibero-American Championships	Guatemala City, Guatemala	4th	Hammer throw	59.21 m
2003	South American Championships	Barquisimeto, Venezuela	2nd	Hammer throw	59.65 m
2004	Ibero-American Championships	Huelva, Spain	11th	Hammer throw	57.39 m
2005	South American Championships	Cali, Colombia	5th	Hammer throw	59.91 m
2006	Ibero-American Championships	Ponce, Puerto Rico	4th	Hammer throw	61.17 m
2006	South American Championships	Tunja, Colombia	4th	Hammer throw	63.86 m
2007	Pan American Games	Rio de Janeiro, Brazil	10th	Hammer throw	62.13 m
2008	Ibero-American Championships	Iquique, Chile	3rd	Hammer throw	63.09 m
2010	Ibero-American Championships	San Fernando, Spain	7th	Hammer throw	60.40 m
2011	South American Championships	Buenos Aires, Argentina	4th	Hammer throw	61.77 m
2011	Pan American Games	Guadalajara, Mexico	9th	Hammer throw	61.47 m
2012	Ibero-American Championships	Barquisimeto, Venezuela	5th	Hammer throw	60.24 m
