= 2004 Ibero-American Championships in Athletics – Results =

These are the official results of the 2004 Ibero-American Championships in Athletics which took place on August 6–8, 2004 in Huelva, Spain.

== Men's results ==
=== 100 meters ===
Heats – August 6
Wind:
Heat 1: 0.0 m/s, Heat 2: 0.0 m/s, Heat 3: 0.0 m/s

Rank	Heat	Name	Nationality	Time	Notes
1	3	Vicente de Lima	Brazil	10.29	Q
2	2	Juan Sainfleur	Dominican Republic	10.44	Q
3	1	André da Silva	Brazil	10.49	Q
4	1	Victor Manuel Rosas	Spain	10.57	Q
5	3	Juan Pedro Toledo	Mexico	10.60	Q
6	1	Diego Ferreira	Paraguay	10.65	q
7	2	John Jairo Córdoba	Colombia	10.67	Q
8	2	Ricardo Pacheco	Portugal	10.69	q
9	2	Mario Rolando Blanco	Guatemala	10.75	
10	3	Iván Mocholí	Spain	10.77	
11	3	Matías Usandivaras	Argentina	10.89	
12	3	Diego Valdés	Chile	11.02	
13	2	Yazarldes Afonso	São Tomé and Príncipe	11.06	
14	3	Víctor Cantillano	Costa Rica	11.11	
15	2	Edson Dongoxe	Angola	11.32	
16	3	John Zavala	Paraguay	11.34	
17	1	Sergio Mbanzo	Equatorial Guinea	11.73	
	1	Carlos Abaunza	Nicaragua	DNS	
	1	Xato José Muinde	Mozambique	DNS	
	1	Jorge Richardson	Puerto Rico	DNS	
	2	Jone Fernando Co	Guinea-Bissau	DNS	

Final – August 6
Wind:
0.0 m/s

Rank	Lane	Name	Nationality	Time	Notes
1st place, gold medalist(s)	6	Vicente de Lima	Brazil	10.15	
2nd place, silver medalist(s)	3	André da Silva	Brazil	10.21	
3rd place, bronze medalist(s)	4	Juan Sainfleur	Dominican Republic	10.28	
4	7	Juan Pedro Toledo	Mexico	10.48	
5	2	Diego Ferreira	Paraguay	10.56	
6	5	Victor Manuel Rosas	Spain	10.66	
7	1	Ricardo Pacheco	Portugal	10.67	
8	8	John Jairo Córdoba	Colombia	10.74	

Extra – August 6
Wind:
0.0 m/s

Rank	Name	Nationality	Time	Notes
1	Cláudio Roberto Souza	Brazil	10.35	
2	Bruno Pacheco	Brazil	10.40	
3	Jarbas Mascarenhas	Brazil	10.41	
4	Basílio de Moraes Júnior	Brazil	10.61	
5	Alberto Dorrego	Spain	10.77	
6	Jonathan Medina	Venezuela	10.78	
7	Pablo Colville	Chile	10.85	

=== 200 meters ===
Heats – August 7
Wind:
Heat 1: -2.3 m/s, Heat 2: -1.8 m/s, Heat 3: -3.2 m/s

Rank	Heat	Name	Nationality	Time	Notes
1	2	Juan Pedro Toledo	Mexico	21.38	Q
1	3	Bruno Pacheco	Brazil	21.38	Q
3	1	Basílio de Moraes Júnior	Brazil	21.43	Q
4	1	Ángel David Rodríguez	Spain	21.49	Q
5	3	Jorge Richardson	Puerto Rico	21.56	Q
6	3	Luis Alfonso Vega	Colombia	21.64	q
7	3	Santiago Ezquerro	Spain	21.67	q
8	2	Heber Viera	Uruguay	21.87	Q
9	3	Guillermo Mayer	Chile	22.05	
10	2	Helly Ollarves	Venezuela	22.07	
11	3	Angelo Edmund	Panama	22.35	
12	1	Deodato Freitas	São Tomé and Príncipe	22.47	
13	1	John Zavala	Paraguay	22.64	
14	2	Alex Giovani Navas	Honduras	22.85	
15	2	Víctor Cantillano	Costa Rica	22.90	
16	2	Edson Dongoxe	Angola	23.15	
17	2	Sergio Mbanzo	Equatorial Guinea	24.17	
	1	José Carabalí	Colombia	DQ	R 163.3
	1	Carlos Abaunza	Nicaragua	DNS	
	1	Matías Usandivaras	Argentina	DNS	
	2	Diego Ferreira	Paraguay	DNS	
	3	Xato José Muinde	Mozambique	DNS	
	3	Odair da Costa	Guinea-Bissau	DNS	

Final – August 8
Wind:
-4.3 m/s

Rank	Lane	Name	Nationality	Time	Notes
1st place, gold medalist(s)	4	Juan Pedro Toledo	Mexico	20.84	
2nd place, silver medalist(s)	6	Bruno Pacheco	Brazil	20.93	
3rd place, bronze medalist(s)	7	Heber Viera	Uruguay	21.30	
4	3	Ángel David Rodríguez	Spain	21.69	
5	2	Santiago Ezquerro	Spain	21.71	
6	5	Basílio de Moraes Júnior	Brazil	21.75	
7	8	Luis Alfonso Vega	Colombia	21.78	
8	1	Jorge Richardson	Puerto Rico	21.84	

=== 400 meters ===
Heats – August 6

Rank	Heat	Name	Nationality	Time	Notes
1	2	Carlos Santa	Dominican Republic	45.43	Q
2	1	Yeimer López	Cuba	45.67	Q
3	3	Alejandro Cárdenas	Mexico	45.69	Q
4	2	Anderson Jorge dos Santos	Brazil	45.80	Q
5	1	Arismendy Peguero	Dominican Republic	46.14	Q
6	1	Andrés Silva	Uruguay	46.21	q
7	3	Sanderlei Parrela	Brazil	46.59	Q
8	2	Salvador Rodríguez	Spain	46.80	q
9	1	David Testa	Spain	46.87	
10	3	Jonathan Palma	Venezuela	46.96	
11	2	Johswyn Abrams	Puerto Rico	47.52	
12	2	Mauricio Mery	Chile	47.95	
13	3	Angelo Edmund	Panama	48.09	
14	1	Felix Martínez	Puerto Rico	48.11	
15	3	Esteban Brandán	Argentina	48.43	
16	1	Nicolás López	Paraguay	48.81	
	3	Daniel Ruiz*	Spain	46.89	
	3	Antonio Side*	Dominican Republic	46.94	
	1	Wagner Souza*	Brazil	47.24	
	2	Danilson Ricciuli	Guinea-Bissau	DNS	

Final – August 7

Rank	Lane	Name	Nationality	Time	Notes
1st place, gold medalist(s)	5	Carlos Santa	Dominican Republic	45.05	
2nd place, silver medalist(s)	4	Yeimer López	Cuba	45.21	
3rd place, bronze medalist(s)	6	Alejandro Cárdenas	Mexico	45.22	
4	7	Arismendy Peguero	Dominican Republic	45.63	
5	3	Anderson Jorge dos Santos	Brazil	45.65	
6	1	Andrés Silva	Uruguay	46.63	
7	8	Sanderlei Parrela	Brazil	46.82	
8	2	Salvador Rodríguez	Spain	47.29	

=== 800 meters ===
Heats – August 6

Rank	Heat	Name	Nationality	Time	Notes
1	2	José Manuel Cortés	Spain	1:48.82	Q
2	2	Joao Pires	Portugal	1:48.97	Q
3	2	Edgar Rivera	Colombia	1:49.06	Q, SB
4	2	Simoncito Silvera	Venezuela	1:49.19	q
5	2	Osmar dos Santos	Brazil	1:50.00	q
6	2	Fadrique Iglesias	Bolivia	1:50.20	SB
7	1	Salvador Crespo	Spain	1:51.18	Q
8	1	Diogo Sousa	Portugal	1:51.66	Q
9	1	Cristián Matute	Ecuador	1:51.93	Q
10	1	César Barquero	Peru	1:51.97	
11	1	Valdinei da Silva	Brazil	1:52.17	
12	1	Nelson David Silva	Angola	2:04.28	

Final – August 8

Rank	Name	Nationality	Time	Notes
1st place, gold medalist(s)	José Manuel Cortés	Spain	1:46.51	SB
2nd place, silver medalist(s)	Salvador Crespo	Spain	1:46.78	SB
3rd place, bronze medalist(s)	Simoncito Silvera	Venezuela	1:47.26	SB
4	Joao Pires	Portugal	1:47.29	
5	Diogo Sousa	Portugal	1:47.70	
6	Edgar Rivera	Colombia	1:49.19	
7	Cristián Matute	Ecuador	1:49.35	
	Osmar dos Santos	Brazil	DNF	

=== 1500 meters ===
August 7

Rank	Name	Nationality	Time	Notes
1st place, gold medalist(s)	Sergio Gallardo	Spain	3:37.34	CR
2nd place, silver medalist(s)	Hudson de Souza	Brazil	3:37.66	
3rd place, bronze medalist(s)	Arturo Casado	Spain	3:40.30	
4	Bayron Piedra	Ecuador	3:40.88	
5	Javier Carriqueo	Argentina	3:42.01	SB
6	José Manuel González	Venezuela	3:45.23	SB
7	Adelino Monteiro	Portugal	3:45.67	
8	Pedro Filipe	Portugal	3:45.76	
9	Fadrique Iglesias	Bolivia	3:49.24	SB
10	Celso Ficagna	Brazil	3:51.27	
11	Roberto García	Chile	3:58.99	
	José Francisco Domingos	Angola	DNF	
	Max Harn	Panama	DNS	

=== 3000 meters ===
August 8

Rank	Name	Nationality	Time	Notes
1st place, gold medalist(s)	Hudson de Souza	Brazil	7:51.25	CR
2nd place, silver medalist(s)	Carles Castillejo	Spain	7:51.26	
3rd place, bronze medalist(s)	Antonio Travassos	Portugal	7:57.23	SB
4	Pablo Villalobos	Spain	7:59.46	
5	Freddy González	Venezuela	8:00.23	
6	Bayron Piedra	Ecuador	8:08.58	
7	José Maduro	Portugal	8:11.62	SB
8	Miguel Candona	Angola	9:04.10	
	Celso Ficagna	Brazil	DNF	
	Javier Carriqueo	Argentina	DNS	
	Mariano Mastromarino	Argentina	DNS	

=== 5000 meters ===
August 6

Rank	Name	Nationality	Time	Notes
1st place, gold medalist(s)	Jesús España	Spain	13:48.09	
2nd place, silver medalist(s)	Freddy González	Venezuela	13:49.05	
3rd place, bronze medalist(s)	Juan Carlos de la Ossa	Spain	13:52.15	
4	Hélder Ornelas	Portugal	13:55.21	
5	Mauricio Díaz	Chile	13:56.09	
6	Rafael Sánchez	Mexico	13:57.38	
7	Teodoro Vega	Mexico	13:59.25	
8	William Naranjo	Colombia	14:24.05	
9	Euclides Varela	Cape Verde	14:26.37	
10	Rui Pedro Silva	Portugal	14:32.85	
11	Artur Santiago	Angola	14:37.66	
12	Joaquín Chamane	Angola	14:41.26	
	Buenaventura Yanez	Equatorial Guinea	DNS	

=== 110 meters hurdles ===
Heats – August 7
Wind:
Heat 1: -1.7 m/s, Heat 2: -0.4 m/s

Rank	Heat	Name	Nationality	Time	Notes
1	1	Matheus Facho Inocencio	Brazil	13.65	Q
1	2	Yuniel Hernández	Cuba	13.65	Q
3	2	Jackson Quinónez	Ecuador	13.70	Q
4	1	Yoel Hernández	Cuba	13.75	Q
5	1	Felipe Vivancos	Spain	13.79	Q
6	1	Paulo Villar	Colombia	13.82	q
7	2	Alexis Sánchez	Spain	14.00	Q
8	2	Luís Sá	Portugal	14.17	q
9	2	Francisco Schilling	Chile	14.52	
10	1	Javier Culson	Puerto Rico	14.65	
11	1	Rui Palma	Portugal	14.85	
12	2	Arlindo Leócadio Pinheiro	São Tomé and Príncipe	15.82	
	2	Redelén dos Santos	Brazil	DNF	
	1	Sandro Sánchez	Panama	DNS	

Final – August 8
Wind:
-0.6 m/s

Rank	Lane	Name	Nationality	Time	Notes
1st place, gold medalist(s)	4	Yoel Hernández	Cuba	13.49	
2nd place, silver medalist(s)	6	Matheus Facho Inocencio	Brazil	13.52	
3rd place, bronze medalist(s)	3	Jackson Quinónez	Ecuador	13.61	
4	1	Paulo Villar	Colombia	13.64	
5	7	Felipe Vivancos	Spain	13.82	
6	2	Alexis Sánchez	Spain	13.90	
7	8	Luís Sá	Portugal	14.22	
	5	Yuniel Hernández	Cuba	DNS	

=== 400 meters hurdles ===
Heats – August 6

Rank	Heat	Name	Nationality	Time	Notes
1	1	Eduardo Iván Rodríguez	Spain	49.27	Q
2	2	José María Romera	Spain	49.51	Q
3	2	Oscar Juanz	Mexico	50.17	Q
4	1	Cleverson da Silva	Brazil	50.51	Q
5	2	Edivaldo Monteiro	Portugal	50.99	Q
6	1	Carlos Zbinden	Chile	51.25	Q
7	1	Carlos Silva	Portugal	51.55	q
8	2	Eronilde de Araújo	Brazil	51.59	q
9	1	Javier Culson	Puerto Rico	53.66	
10	2	Luis Montenegro	Chile	53.69	
	1	Roberto Cortés	El Salvador	DNF	
	2	Sebastián Lasquera	Argentina	DNF	

Final – August 7

Rank	Lane	Name	Nationality	Time	Notes
1st place, gold medalist(s)	4	Eduardo Iván Rodríguez	Spain	49.08	SB
2nd place, silver medalist(s)	2	Edivaldo Monteiro	Portugal	49.31	
3rd place, bronze medalist(s)	5	José María Romera	Spain	49.92	
4	6	Oscar Juanz	Mexico	49.97	
5	7	Carlos Silva	Portugal	50.29	
6	3	Cleverson da Silva	Brazil	50.72	
7	8	Carlos Zbinden	Chile	52.14	
	1	Eronilde de Araújo	Brazil	DNS	

=== 3000 meters steeplechase ===
August 7

Rank	Name	Nationality	Time	Notes
1st place, gold medalist(s)	César Pérez	Spain	8:30.83	
2nd place, silver medalist(s)	Mario Teixeira	Portugal	8:33.26	
3rd place, bronze medalist(s)	Fernando Alex Fernandes	Brazil	8:35.92	
4	José Luis Blanco	Spain	8:39.39	
5	Néstor Nieves	Venezuela	8:39.58	
6	Pedro Ribeiro	Portugal	8:45.19	
7	Mariano Mastromarino	Argentina	8:47.17	
8	Salvador Miranda	Mexico	8:50.22	
9	Alexander Greaux	Puerto Rico	9:11.11	

=== 4 x 100 meters relay ===
August 7

Rank	Lane	Nation	Competitors	Time	Notes
1st place, gold medalist(s)	6	Brazil	Cláudio Roberto Souza, Jarbas Mascarenhas, Vicente de Lima, André da Silva	38.62	
2nd place, silver medalist(s)	5	Spain	Alberto Dorrego, Santiago Ezquerro, Iván Mocholí, Ángel David Rodríguez	39.70	
3rd place, bronze medalist(s)	4	Venezuela	Juan Vizcaíno, Jonathan Medina, José Carabalí, Elly Ollarves	39.91	
4	8	Argentina	Ariel Roberto López, Sebastián Lasquera, Alejandro Brandán, Matías Usandivaras	42.15	
	3	Chile	Pablo Colville, Guillermo Myer, Diego Valdés, Mauricio Mery	DQ	
	2	Angola		DNS	

=== 4 x 400 meters relay ===
August 8

Rank	Nation	Competitors	Time	Notes
1st place, gold medalist(s)	Spain	Eduardo Iván Rodríguez, Antonio Manuel Reina, Luis Flores, David Testa	3:05.68	
2nd place, silver medalist(s)	Brazil	Bruno Pacheco, Valdinei da Silva, Wagner Souza, Anderson Jorge dos Santos	3:06.19	
3rd place, bronze medalist(s)	Venezuela	William José Hernández, Simoncito Silvera, José Faneite, Jonathan Palma	3:10.41	
	Chile		DNS	
	Dominican Republic		DNS	
	Puerto Rico		DNS	

=== 20,000 meters walk ===
August 7

Rank	Name	Nationality	Time	Notes
1st place, gold medalist(s)	Cristian Berdeja	Mexico	1:24:30.2	
2nd place, silver medalist(s)	José Alessandro Bagio	Brazil	1:25:13.1	
3rd place, bronze medalist(s)	Freddy Hernández	Colombia	1:26:16.7	
4	Luis Fernando García	Guatemala	1:27:00.7	
5	Sérgio Galdino	Brazil	1:28:00.4	
6	Fausto Quinde	Ecuador	1:28:34.6	
7	Augusto Cardoso	Portugal	1:29:16.1	
8	Allan Segura	Costa Rica	1:30:46.7	
9	Edwin Centeno	Peru	1:35:07.9	
	Cristian Muñoz	Chile	DNF	
	José Ignacio Aledo	Spain	DQ	
	Marío José Almeida	Argentina	DQ	
	José Alejandro Cambil	Spain	DQ	
	Erick Guevara	Mexico	DQ	
	Julio René Martínez	Guatemala	DQ	

=== High jump ===
August 7

Rank	Name	Nationality	2.05	2.10	2.15	2.18	2.21	2.24	2.29	Result	Notes
1st place, gold medalist(s)	Lisvany Pérez	Cuba	–	o	o	–	o	xxo	xxx	2.24	
2nd place, silver medalist(s)	Jessé de Lima	Brazil	–	–	o	–	o	xxx		2.21	
3rd place, bronze medalist(s)	Alfredo Deza	Peru	–	o	o	xo	xxo	xxx		2.21	SB
4	Fábio Baptista	Brazil	o	o	xo	o	xxx			2.18	
4	Javier Bermejo	Spain	–	xo	o	o	xxx			2.18	
6	Rafael Gonçalves	Portugal	o	xxo	xo	o	xxx			2.18	SB
7	Gerardo Martínez	Mexico	o	o	o	xxx				2.15	
8	Enrique Márquez	Spain	–	o	xo	xxx				2.15	

=== Pole vault ===
August 8

Rank	Name	Nationality	4.60	4.80	5.00	5.20	5.30	5.35	5.40	5.45	5.55	Result	Notes
1st place, gold medalist(s)	Fábio Gomes da Silva	Brazil	–	–	–	o	–	–	xo	–	xxx	5.40	
2nd place, silver medalist(s)	Giovanni Lanaro	Mexico	–	–	–	xo	–	xxo	xxx			5.35	
3rd place, bronze medalist(s)	Germán Chiaraviglio	Argentina	–	–	o	xo	o	–	xx	x		5.30	
3rd place, bronze medalist(s)	Roger Noguera	Spain	–	–	xo	o	o	–	xxx			5.30	
5	Robison Pratt	Mexico	–	–	–	xo	–	xxx				5.20	
6	Joao André	Portugal	–	–	o	xxx						5.00	
6	Javier Gazol	Spain	–	–	o	xxx						5.00	
8	Jorge Naranjo	Chile	–	o	xo	xxx						5.00	
9	Joao Gabriel de Souza	Brazil	–	xo	xo	xxx						5.00	
10	Francisco León	Peru	–	xxo	xxx							4.80	
	Javier Benítez	Argentina	–	–	xxx							NM	
	José Francisco Nava	Chile	xxx									NM	

=== Long jump ===
August 8

Rank	Name	Nationality	#1	#2	#3	#4	#5	#6	Result	Notes
1st place, gold medalist(s)	Joan Lino Martínez	Spain	5.76	8.26	–	–	–	–	8.26	
2nd place, silver medalist(s)	Víctor Castillo	Venezuela	7.57	7.81	7.86	7.95	7.90	7.84	7.95	
3rd place, bronze medalist(s)	Iván Pedroso	Cuba	x	7.69	x	7.74	x	7.78	7.78	
4	Carlos Calado	Portugal	7.65	7.74	7.58	7.63	7.67	x	7.74	
5	Alberto Sanz	Spain	7.38	7.72	x	x	x	7.65	7.72	
6	Gaspar Araújo	Portugal	7.65	x	7.48	7.69	7.66	x	7.69	
7	Leandro de Jesús	Brazil	7.44	7.53	7.52	5.37	–	–	7.53	
8	Luiggy Llanos	Puerto Rico	7.15	7.26	7.38	x	6.82	7.10	7.38	
9	Eric Kerwitz	Argentina	6.95	7.12	x				7.12	
10	Rodrigo de Araújo	Brazil	x	x	6.96				6.96	
11	Luis Méliz	Cuba	6.60	x	x				6.60	
	Jorge Naranjo	Chile							DNS	
	Oscar Alvarenga	Paraguay							DNS	

=== Triple jump ===
August 6

Rank	Name	Nationality	#1	#2	#3	#4	#5	#6	Result	Notes
1st place, gold medalist(s)	Arnie David Giralt	Cuba	16.98	16.91	17.12	x	–	16.73	17.12	
2nd place, silver medalist(s)	Yoel García	Cuba	16.51	16.34	16.59	–	–	–	16.59	
3rd place, bronze medalist(s)	Jefferson Sabino	Brazil	16.16	15.78	x	15.92	13.74	x	16.16	
4	Marcelo da Costa	Brazil	15.99	15.75	15.78	15.58	15.88	15.82	15.99	
5	Johnny Rodríguez	Venezuela	x	15.52	15.48	15.81	15.88	x	15.88	
6	Eduardo Pérez	Spain	15.65	15.73	15.79	x	15.55	15.64	15.79	
7	Nelson Évora	Portugal	15.53	13.71	15.54	–	15.56	x	15.56	
8	Taha Bakali-Tahiri	Spain	14.84	14.84	13.24	15.24	–	14.96	15.24	
9	Felipe Apablaza	Chile	x	14.83	x				14.83	
	Yoandri Betanzos*	Cuba	17.18	–	–				17.18	
	Yoelbi Quesada*	Cuba	16.66	16.88	17.13				17.13	
	Oscar Alvarenga	Paraguay	x	x	x				NM	
	Alvin Rentería	Colombia							DNS	

=== Shot put ===
August 6

Rank	Name	Nationality	#1	#2	#3	#4	#5	#6	Result	Notes
1st place, gold medalist(s)	Manuel Martínez	Spain	19.95	19.76	x	x	20.59	x	20.59	
2nd place, silver medalist(s)	Marco Antonio Verni	Chile	20.17	x	19.58	x	x	x	20.17	
3rd place, bronze medalist(s)	Ronny Jiménez	Venezuela	18.33	x	18.33	18.72	x	x	18.72	
4	Yojer Medina	Venezuela	17.85	17.72	17.90	x	x	x	17.90	
5	Francisco Guzmán	Mexico	17.83	17.77	17.90	17.75	17.77	x	17.90	
6	Borja Vivas	Spain	16.86	x	17.02	16.86	16.96	17.09	17.09	
7	Marco Fortes	Portugal	16.68	16.70	16.88	17.01	16.91	x	17.01	
8	Juan Tello	Peru	16.88	x	x	x	16.62	x	16.88	

=== Discus throw ===
August 8

Rank	Name	Nationality	#1	#2	#3	#4	#5	#6	Result	Notes
1st place, gold medalist(s)	Mario Pestano	Spain	61.07	62.93	61.35	63.84	x	62.10	63.84	
2nd place, silver medalist(s)	Lois Maikel Martínez	Cuba	60.13	59.02	60.82	62.08	x	x	62.08	
3rd place, bronze medalist(s)	Jorge Balliengo	Argentina	59.24	58.27	x	57.29	58.34	x	59.24	
4	Marcelo Pugliese	Argentina	56.51	58.01	59.05	x	x	x	59.05	
5	Paulo Bernardo	Portugal	x	58.31	x	58.07	x	x	58.31	
6	Luis Carlos Puerto	Honduras	41.22	43.08	44.36	x	43.78	41.67	44.36	SB

=== Hammer throw ===
August 7

Rank	Name	Nationality	#1	#2	#3	#4	#5	#6	Result	Notes
1st place, gold medalist(s)	Juan Ignacio Cerra	Argentina	71.65	73.34	73.33	x	x	x	73.34	
2nd place, silver medalist(s)	Moisés Campeny	Spain	68.71	68.89	71.01	x	69.48	69.68	71.01	
3rd place, bronze medalist(s)	Adrián Marzo	Argentina	65.53	65.39	67.21	66.22	67.89	65.98	67.89	
4	Ignacio Calderón	Spain	59.37	65.70	66.87	x	67.66	x	67.66	
5	Dário Manso	Portugal	64.55	64.20	64.57	x	x	x	64.57	
6	Raúl Rivera	Guatemala	55.21	57.20	x	59.16	59.52	59.09	59.52	

=== Javelin throw ===
August 6

Rank	Name	Nationality	#1	#2	#3	#4	#5	#6	Result	Notes
1st place, gold medalist(s)	Isbel Luaces	Cuba	73.42	71.04	76.36	77.93	75.68	77.98	77.98	
2nd place, silver medalist(s)	Emeterio González	Cuba	76.34	x	x	x	72.08	75.06	76.34	
3rd place, bronze medalist(s)	Noraldo Palacios	Colombia	76.00	71.60	74.69	74.65	73.67	x	76.00	SB
4	Manuel Fuenmayor	Venezuela	69.54	73.20	73.81	x	x	72.05	73.81	
5	Alexon Maximiano	Brazil	69.87	66.59	x	61.28	73.46	–	73.46	
6	Luiz Fernando da Silva	Brazil	70.99	70.45	71.21	70.92	69.48	67.67	71.21	
7	Diego Moraga	Chile	69.16	68.68	70.79	63.74	71.11	69.65	71.11	
8	Gustavo Dacal	Spain	69.01	69.45	68.16	x	66.34	66.80	69.45	
9	Raimundo Fernández	Spain	65.47	66.22	64.96				66.22	
10	Rigoberto Calderón	Nicaragua	x	x	60.16				60.16	
	José Manuel Hermoso*	Spain	65.96	x	64.19				65.96	
	Daniel Alonzo	Dominican Republic							DNS	

=== Decathlon ===
August 6–7

The highest mark recorded in each event is highlighted in yellow

Rank	Athlete	Nationality	100m	LJ	SP	HJ	400m	110m H	DT	PV	JT	1500m	Points	Notes
1st place, gold medalist(s)	David Gómez	Spain	11.03	7.40	14.19	1.90	48.60	14.33	40.83	4.40	62.53	4:33.44	7940	CR
2nd place, silver medalist(s)	Enrique Aguirre	Argentina	11.06	6.99	14.43	2.05	49.19	14.92	38.49	4.50	53.85	4:38.65	7703	
3rd place, bronze medalist(s)	Óscar González	Spain	11.18	7.15	13.12	2.05	50.23	14.98	39.48	4.50	46.81	4:28.95	7560	
4	Octavious Gillespie	Guatemala	11.60	7.07	13.44	2.05	52.13	15.54	41.02	4.50	62.13	4:52.32	7430	
5	Juan Pedro Santarosa	Mexico	11.46	5.89	10.83	1.75	50.95	15.74	35.06	NM	44.87	DNF	5056	
	Mário Aníbal	Portugal	11.43	6.56	14.69	1.93	50.82	15.59	43.12	4.50	DNS	–	DNF	
	Édson Bindilatti	Brazil	11.10	7.02	12.41	1.99	48.41	14.82	34.72	DNF	DNS	–	DNF	
	Marc Magrans*	Spain	11.02	5.50	DNS	–	–	–	–	–	–	–	DNF	

== Women's results ==
=== 100 meters ===
Heats – August 6
Wind:
Heat 1: -0.7 m/s, Heat 2: -0.4 m/s, Heat 3: -0.9 m/s

Rank	Heat	Name	Nationality	Time	Notes
1	2	Virgen Benavides	Cuba	11.27	Q
2	1	Liliana Allen	Mexico	11.50	Q
3	2	Digna Luz Murillo	Colombia	11.54	Q
4	3	Lucimar de Moura	Brazil	11.58	Q
5	3	Misleidys Lazo	Cuba	11.60	Q
6	1	Rosemar Coelho Neto	Brazil	11.70	Q
7	1	Melissa Murillo	Colombia	11.77	q
8	2	Elena Córcoles	Spain	11.90	q
9	1	Elisa Cossa	Mozambique	12.00	
10	3	Arantxa Iglesias	Spain	12.01	
11	1	Roxana Mercado	Puerto Rico	12.19	
11	2	Vanesa Wohlgemuth	Argentina	12.21	
12	3	Daniela Pávez	Chile	12.25	
13	2	Antonia de Jesús	Angola	12.39	
14	1	Maitté Zamorano	Bolivia	12.50	
15	3	Jeimy Bernárdez	Honduras	12.64	
16	3	Mayra Álvarez	Nicaragua	13.53	

Final – August 6
Wind:
0.0 m/s

Rank	Lane	Name	Nationality	Time	Notes
1st place, gold medalist(s)	4	Virgen Benavides	Cuba	11.33	
2nd place, silver medalist(s)	6	Digna Luz Murillo	Colombia	11.41	SB
3rd place, bronze medalist(s)	5	Lucimar de Moura	Brazil	11.45	
4	3	Liliana Allen	Mexico	11.53	
5	8	Rosemar Coelho Neto	Brazil	11.76	
6	2	Melissa Murillo	Colombia	11.77	
7	7	Elena Córcoles	Spain	11.89	
	1	Misleidys Lazo	Cuba	DNS	

Extra – August 6
Wind:
0.0 m/s

Rank	Name	Nationality	Time	Notes
1	Kátia Regina Santos	Brazil	11.71	
2	Thatiana Regina Ignâcio	Brazil	11.71	
3	María Antonia Duque	Spain	11.96	
4	María José Echeverría	Chile	12.09	
5	María Izabel Coloma	Chile	12.23	
6	Daniela Riderelli	Chile	12.25	

=== 200 meters ===
Heats – August 7
Wind:
Heat 1: -2.2 m/s, Heat 2: -1.0 m/s

Rank	Heat	Name	Nationality	Time	Notes
1	1	Lucimar de Moura	Brazil	23.92	Q
2	2	Roxana Díaz	Cuba	23.98	Q
3	1	Felipa Palacios	Colombia	24.02	Q
4	1	Ruth Grajeda	Mexico	24.23	Q
5	2	Rosemar Coelho Neto	Brazil	24.34	Q
6	2	Belén Recio	Spain	24.41	Q
7	1	Militza Castro	Puerto Rico	24.42	q
8	1	Carolina García	Spain	24.63	q
9	1	María Fernanda Mackenna	Chile	25.28	
10	2	Antonia de Jesús	Angola	25.83	
11	2	Patricia Martínez	Paraguay	27.43	
	1	Mayra Álvarez	Nicaragua	DNS	
	2	J. dos Santos	Mozambique	DNS	
	2	Roxana Mercado	Puerto Rico	DNS	
	2	Vanesa Wohlgemuth	Argentina	DNS	

Final – August 8
Wind:
-1.6 m/s

Rank	Lane	Name	Nationality	Time	Notes
1st place, gold medalist(s)	5	Roxana Díaz	Cuba	23.73	
2nd place, silver medalist(s)	3	Felipa Palacios	Colombia	23.77	
3rd place, bronze medalist(s)	4	Rosemar Coelho Neto	Brazil	23.83	
4	2	Ruth Grajeda	Mexico	24.00	
5	7	Belén Recio	Spain	24.33	
6	1	Carolina García	Spain	24.53	
	6	Lucimar de Moura	Brazil	DQ	R 163.3
	8	Militza Castro	Puerto Rico	DNS	

=== 400 meters ===
Heats – August 6

Rank	Heat	Name	Nationality	Time	Notes
1	2	Maria Laura Almirao	Brazil	52.50	Q
2	2	Mayra González	Mexico	52.70	Q
3	2	Julia Alba	Spain	52.71	Q
4	1	Carmo Tavares	Portugal	52.72	Q
5	1	Geisa Coutinho	Brazil	52.77	Q
6	1	Miriam Bravo	Spain	54.03	Q, SB
7	1	Lucy Jaramillo	Ecuador	54.58	q
8	2	Neide Dias	Angola	1:01.43	q
9	2	Mari Luz Obono	Equatorial Guinea	1:03.89	
	2	Catalina Oliver*	Spain	DNF	
	1	Maria Figueiredo	Brazil	DNS	
	1	Anhel Cape	Guinea-Bissau	DNS	

Final – August 7

Rank	Lane	Name	Nationality	Time	Notes
1st place, gold medalist(s)	3	Maria Laura Almirao	Brazil	52.13	
2nd place, silver medalist(s)	6	Mayra González	Mexico	52.22	SB
3rd place, bronze medalist(s)	5	Geisa Coutinho	Brazil	52.42	
4	4	Carmo Tavares	Portugal	52.90	
5	2	Julia Alba	Spain	53.10	
6	7	Miriam Bravo	Spain	53.94	SB
7	8	Lucy Jaramillo	Ecuador	54.83	
	1	Neide Dias	Angola	1:02.82	

=== 800 meters ===
Heats – August 6

Rank	Heat	Name	Nationality	Time	Notes
1	1	Zulia Calatayud	Cuba	2:03.76	Q
2	1	Rosibel García	Colombia	2:04.05	Q
3	1	Sandra Teixeira	Portugal	2:04.09	Q
4	1	Esther Desviat	Spain	2:04.19	q
5	1	Luciana Mendes	Brazil	2:04.50	q
6	2	Nedia Semedo	Portugal	2:05.04	Q
7	2	Mayte Martínez	Spain	2:05.05	Q
8	2	Josiane Tito	Brazil	2:05.05	Q
9	2	Tina Paulino	Mozambique	2:05.69	
10	2	María de los Ángeles Pantoja	Mexico	2:09.51	
11	1	Marcela Britos	Uruguay	2:09.90	
12	2	Mariela Álvarez	Peru	2:10.92	
13	1	Reyna Obando	Nicaragua	2:26.09	
	2	Sandra Moya	Puerto Rico	DNS	

Final – August 8

Rank	Name	Nationality	Time	Notes
1st place, gold medalist(s)	Zulia Calatayud	Cuba	2:01.30	
2nd place, silver medalist(s)	Mayte Martínez	Spain	2:01.39	
3rd place, bronze medalist(s)	Sandra Teixeira	Portugal	2:02.44	
4	Nedia Semedo	Portugal	2:02.79	
5	Luciana Mendes	Brazil	2:03.36	
6	Rosibel García	Colombia	2:04.07	
7	Esther Desviat	Spain	2:04.29	
	Josiane Tito	Brazil	DNF	

=== 1500 meters ===
August 7

Rank	Name	Nationality	Time	Notes
1st place, gold medalist(s)	Irene Alfonso	Spain	4:14.80	SB
2nd place, silver medalist(s)	Eva Arias	Spain	4:16.61	
3rd place, bronze medalist(s)	Jéssica Augusto	Portugal	4:18.14	
4	Niusha Mancilla	Bolivia	4:21.52	
5	Fabianne da Silva	Brazil	4:22.36	
6	Susana Rebolledo	Chile	4:26.16	SB
7	Mariela Álvarez	Peru	4:32.46	
8	Mónica Amboya	Ecuador	4:32.47	
9	Rosa Saul	Angola	4:38.05	
10	Cláudia Pereira	Portugal	4:38.87	
11	Gabriela Trana	Costa Rica	4:48.27	
	Evelyn Guerra	Panama	DNF	
	Reyna Obando	Nicaragua	DNF	
	Domingas Togna	Guinea-Bissau	DNS	
	Michelle da Costa	Brazil	DNS	

=== 3000 meters ===
August 8

Rank	Name	Nationality	Time	Notes
1st place, gold medalist(s)	Jéssica Augusto	Portugal	9:02.36	CR
2nd place, silver medalist(s)	Jacqueline Martín	Spain	9:03.64	SB
3rd place, bronze medalist(s)	Mónica Rosa	Portugal	9:08.74	SB
4	Judith Plá	Spain	9:11.20	SB
5	Fabianne da Silva	Brazil	9:27.54	
6	Niusha Mancilla	Bolivia	9:28.70	SB
7	Zenaide Vieira	Brazil	9:30.80	
8	Yolanda Caballero	Colombia	9:36.86	
9	Inés Melchor	Peru	9:37.35	
10	Clara Morales	Chile	9:41.44	
11	Gabriela Trana	Costa Rica	9:50.56	SB
12	Elena Guerra	Uruguay	9:56.37	
	Bertha Sánchez	Colombia	DNS	

=== 5000 meters ===
August 7

Rank	Name	Nationality	Time	Notes
1st place, gold medalist(s)	Fernanda Ribeiro	Portugal	15:27.53	
2nd place, silver medalist(s)	María Luisa Larraga	Spain	15:32.29	SB
3rd place, bronze medalist(s)	Zulema Fuentes-Pila	Spain	15:56.80	
4	Ednalva da Silva	Brazil	16:11.82	
5	Ines Monteiro	Portugal	16:16.32	
6	Bertha Sánchez	Colombia	16:47.99	
7	Maria Zeferina Baldaia	Brazil	16:49.71	
8	Martha Tenorio	Ecuador	16:55.34	
9	Elena Guerra	Uruguay	17:06.02	
10	Gabriela Trana	Costa Rica	17:15.20	SB
11	Érika Olivera	Chile	17:22.95	
	Teresa Recio*	Spain	15:58.66	

=== 100 meters hurdles ===
Heats – August 7
Wind:
Heat 1: -0.5 m/s, Heat 2: -0.7 m/s

Rank	Heat	Name	Nationality	Time	Notes
1	1	Maíla Machado	Brazil	13.23	Q
2	2	Aliuska López	Spain	13.40	Q
3	1	Arantza Loureiro	Spain	13.59	Q
4	1	Brigitte Merlano	Colombia	13.59	Q
5	1	Zolymar Ferbes	Puerto Rico	13.67	q
6	2	Francisca Guzmán	Chile	13.78	Q
7	2	Princesa Oliveros	Colombia	13.95	Q
8	2	Gilvaneide de Oliveira	Brazil	13.96	q
9	1	Patricia Vieira	Portugal	14.20	
10	2	Sandrine Legenort	Venezuela	14.47	
11	1	Jeimy Bernárdez	Honduras	15.78	
	2	Naide Gomes	Portugal	DNS	

Final – August 8
Wind:
-2.1 m/s

Rank	Lane	Name	Nationality	Time	Notes
1st place, gold medalist(s)	6	Aliuska López	Spain	13.25	
2nd place, silver medalist(s)	3	Maíla Machado	Brazil	13.42	
3rd place, bronze medalist(s)	8	Princesa Oliveros	Colombia	13.72	
4	7	Brigitte Merlano	Colombia	13.77	
5	5	Arantza Loureiro	Spain	13.88	
6	4	Francisca Guzmán	Chile	13.90	
7	1	Zolymar Ferbes	Puerto Rico	13.93	
	2	Gilvaneide de Oliveira	Brazil	DNS	

=== 400 meters hurdles ===
Heats – August 6

Rank	Heat	Name	Nationality	Time	Notes
1	1	Yvonne Harrison	Puerto Rico	55.53	Q, CR
2	2	Daimí Pernía	Cuba	55.55	Q
3	1	Cora Olivero	Spain	55.80	Q, SB
4	2	Lucimar Teodoro	Brazil	57.12	Q
5	1	Isabel da Silva	Brazil	57.77	Q
6	2	Laia Forcadell	Spain	58.01	Q, SB
7	1	Patricia Lopes	Portugal	58.24	q
8	2	Princesa Oliveros	Colombia	59.89	q
9	2	Jessica Miller	Uruguay	1:01.62	

Final – August 7

Rank	Lane	Name	Nationality	Time	Notes
1st place, gold medalist(s)	6	Daimí Pernía	Cuba	54.84	CR
2nd place, silver medalist(s)	3	Lucimar Teodoro	Brazil	56.10	
3rd place, bronze medalist(s)	5	Yvonne Harrison	Puerto Rico	56.10	
4	4	Cora Olivero	Spain	56.47	
5	7	Laia Forcadell	Spain	57.72	SB
6	8	Isabel Silva	Brazil	57.93	
7	1	Princesa Oliveros	Colombia	58.58	
	2	Patricia Lopes	Portugal	DNS	

=== 3000 meters steeplechase ===
August 6

Rank	Name	Nationality	Time	Notes
1st place, gold medalist(s)	Anália Rosa	Portugal	9:49.06	
2nd place, silver medalist(s)	Clarisse Cruz	Portugal	9:55.24	
3rd place, bronze medalist(s)	Yamilka González	Spain	9:56.22	
4	Rosa Morató	Spain	10:09.13	
5	Mónica Amboya	Ecuador	10:11.98	
6	Zenaide Vieira	Brazil	10:22.48	
	Yolanda Caballero	Colombia	DNF	
	Michele Costa	Brazil	DNF	

=== 4 x 100 meters relay ===
August 7

Rank	Lane	Nation	Competitors	Time	Notes
1st place, gold medalist(s)	6	Cuba	Dainelky Pérez, Roxana Díaz, Ana Wilianis López, Virgen Benavides	43.66	
2nd place, silver medalist(s)	4	Colombia	Melissa Murillo, Felipa Palacios, Darlenys Obregón, Digna Luz Murillo	43.79	
3rd place, bronze medalist(s)	2	Brazil	Kátia Regina Santos, Lucimar de Moura, Rosemar Coelho Neto, Luciana dos Santos	44.13	
4	3	Spain	María Antonia Duque, Elena Córcoles, Arantxa Iglesias, Belén Recio	45.07	
	7	Chile	Daniela Riderelli, María Fernanda Mackenna, Daniela Pávez, María José Echeverría	DQ	
	5	Puerto Rico		DNS	

=== 4 x 400 meters relay ===
August 8

Rank	Nation	Competitors	Time	Notes
1st place, gold medalist(s)	Brazil	Geisa Coutinho, Josiane Tito, Lucimar Teodoro, Maria Laura Almirao	3:28.60	CR
2nd place, silver medalist(s)	Spain	Julia Alba, Miriam Bravo, Catalina Oliver, Cora Olivero	3:32.00	
3rd place, bronze medalist(s)	Colombia	Norma González, Felipa Palacios, Darnelys Obregón, Rosibel García	3:33.95	
4	Mexico	Ruth Grajeda, Mayra González, Magaly Yánez, María Pantoja	3:34.56	
	Chile		DNS	

=== 10,000 meters walk ===
August 6

Rank	Name	Nationality	Time	Notes
1st place, gold medalist(s)	Rocío Florido	Spain	44:22.00	
2nd place, silver medalist(s)	Ana Cabecinha	Portugal	44:33.75	
3rd place, bronze medalist(s)	Carolina Jiménez	Spain	44:43.58	
4	Vera Santos	Portugal	47:15.48	
5	Evelin Núnez	Guatemala	48:11.95	
6	Teresita Collado	Guatemala	48:57.31	
7	Miriam Ramón	Ecuador	50:40.04	
8	Alessandra Picagevicz	Brazil	51:55.44	
	Aura Morales	Mexico	DQ	
	Sandra Zapata	Colombia	DQ	
	Geovana Irusta	Bolivia	DNS	

=== High jump ===
August 8

Rank	Name	Nationality	1.70	1.75	1.78	1.81	1.84	1.86	1.88	1.90	1.92	1.94	1.96	1.96	1.94	1.92	1.94	1.92	Result	Notes
1st place, gold medalist(s)	Romary Rifka	Mexico	–	–	–	o	o	o	xxo	o	o	o	xxx	x	x	o	x	o	1.94	
2nd place, silver medalist(s)	Marta Mendía	Spain	–	o	–	o	–	o	–	o	xxo	o	xxx	x	x	o	x	x	1.94	
3rd place, bronze medalist(s)	Caterine Ibargüen	Colombia	–	–	–	o	o	–	o	xxx									1.88	
4	Ruth Beitia	Spain	–	–	–	o	–	o	xxo	–	xxx								1.88	
5	Solange Witteveen	Argentina	–	o	o	o	o	xo	xxx										1.86	
6	Sónia Carvalho	Portugal	o	o	o	xxx													1.78	
7	Jhoris Luques	Venezuela	–	xxo	o	xxx													1.78	
8	Eliana da Silva	Brazil	o	o	xxx														1.75	

=== Pole vault ===
August 6

Rank	Name	Nationality	3.60	3.80	3.90	4.00	4.10	4.20	4.25	4.30	4.35	4.40	Result	Notes
1st place, gold medalist(s)	Naroa Agirre	Spain	–	–	–	o	–	o	–	xo	–	xxx	4.30	
2nd place, silver medalist(s)	Alejandra García	Argentina	–	–	–	o	o	xxo	–	xo	–	xxx	4.30	
3rd place, bronze medalist(s)	Milena Agudelo	Colombia	–	o	o	o	o	xo	xxx				4.20	
4	Dana Cervantes	Spain	–	–	–	–	o	–	–	xx	x		4.10	
5	Sandra Tavares	Portugal	o	xo	o	o	o	xxx					4.10	
6	Joana Costa	Brazil	–	o	o	xxo	xo	xxx					4.10	
7	Déborah Gyurcsek	Uruguay	o	o	–	xo	xxx						4.00	
8	Fabiana Murer	Brazil	–	–	o	xxx							3.90	
9	Carolina Torres	Chile	–	o	xo	xxx							3.90	
10	Alejandra Meza	Mexico	–	–	xxo	xxx							3.90	
11	Elisabete Tavares	Portugal	–	o	–	xxx							3.80	
11	Dennise Orengo	Puerto Rico	–	o	xxx								3.80	
	Mar Sánchez	Spain	–	–	–	o	o	–	o	–	–	xxx	4.25	

=== Long jump ===
August 6

Rank	Name	Nationality	#1	#2	#3	#4	#5	#6	Result	Notes
1st place, gold medalist(s)	Niurka Montalvo	Spain	x	6.26	x	6.58	x	x	6.58	
2nd place, silver medalist(s)	Yudelkis Fernández	Cuba	x	6.25	6.24	6.45	6.30	6.27	6.45	
3rd place, bronze medalist(s)	Concepción Montaner	Spain	x	6.04	4.37	6.33	x	6.40	6.40	
4	Naide Gomes	Portugal	5.90	6.05	6.27	x	6.36	6.33	6.36	
5	Luciana dos Santos	Brazil	6.10	5.98	6.04	x	6.23	6.34	6.34	
6	Keila Costa	Brazil	6.24	6.21	x	6.27	x	x	6.27	
7	Yesenia Rivera	Puerto Rico	x	x	6.01	x	x	5.99	6.01	
8	Yuridia Bustamante	Mexico	5.82	x	x	4.07	x	x	5.82	
9	Marta Godinho	Portugal	5.57	5.74	x				5.74	
10	Macarena Reyes	Chile	5.40	5.56	5.49				5.56	
11	Lesly Vianka Vargas	Bolivia	5.48	5.48	5.44				5.48	
	Arantza Loureiro*	Spain	4.25	x	5.99				5.99	
	María Espencer	Dominican Republic	x	x	x				NM	

=== Triple jump ===
August 7

Rank	Name	Nationality	#1	#2	#3	#4	#5	#6	Result	Notes
1st place, gold medalist(s)	Yusmay Bicet	Cuba	14.15	14.28	13.97	14.51	–	x	14.51	
2nd place, silver medalist(s)	Carlota Castrejana	Spain	13.94	14.20	x	14.16	14.35	14.25	14.35	
3rd place, bronze medalist(s)	Keila Costa	Brazil	13.69	13.52	13.70	13.80	13.61	x	13.80	
4	Rebeca Azcona	Spain	x	13.03	12.81	12.90	x	12.94	13.03	
5	Gisele de Oliveira	Brazil	x	x	12.83	12.92	x	11.22	12.92	
6	Susana Costa	Portugal	12.91	12.71	x	12.86	11.54	x	12.91	
7	María Espencer	Dominican Republic	x	12.71	12.31	x	x	12.33	12.71	
8	Daisy Ugarte	Bolivia	x	12.03	12.32	11.95	12.27	12.36	12.36	
9	Ludmila Reyes	Venezuela	x	x	x				NM	
	Marta Godinho	Portugal							DNS	
	Macarena Reyes	Chile							DNS	

=== Shot put ===
August 8

Rank	Name	Nationality	#1	#2	#3	#4	#5	#6	Result	Notes
1st place, gold medalist(s)	Yumileidi Cumbá	Cuba	18.37	x	x	18.98	x	19.97	19.97	SB
2nd place, silver medalist(s)	Misleydis González	Cuba	18.65	18.22	x	x	x	18.42	18.65	
3rd place, bronze medalist(s)	Elisângela Adriano	Brazil	16.72	16.95	17.41	x	17.79	x	17.79	
4	Fior Vásquez	Dominican Republic	17.05	16.26	16.06	15.97	16.49	16.37	17.05	SB
5	Martina de la Puente	Spain	16.52	16.66	x	x	x	16.74	16.74	
6	Irache Quintanal	Spain	16.14	x	x	16.06	x	16.45	16.45	
7	Paola Cheppi	Argentina	15.28	14.74	15.39	14.76	15.20	15.34	15.39	
8	Maria Antónia Borges	Cape Verde	14.97	14.88	15.00	15.12	14.93	x	15.12	SB
9	Luz Dary Castro	Colombia	x	14.29	14.26				14.26	
10	Dulce Ça	Portugal	14.22	14.10	14.19				14.22	
11	Naide Gomes	Portugal	13.27	13.71	13.80				13.80	SB
	Jennifer Dahlgren	Argentina							DNS	

=== Discus throw ===
August 7

Rank	Name	Nationality	#1	#2	#3	#4	#5	#6	Result	Notes
1st place, gold medalist(s)	Yania Ferrales	Cuba	x	x	57.69	61.11	x	58.95	61.11	
2nd place, silver medalist(s)	Teresa Machado	Portugal	57.48	56.26	x	57.19	57.81	x	57.81	
3rd place, bronze medalist(s)	Alice Matejková	Spain	55.12	57.58	57.37	56.69	x	55.63	57.58	
4	Elisângela Adriano	Brazil	x	57.21	x	x	x	55.76	57.21	
5	Irache Quintanal	Spain	54.57	54.92	53.35	x	51.94	51.68	54.92	
6	Luz Dary Castro	Colombia	x	51.82	x	x	50.10	50.23	51.82	
7	Sónia Borges	Cape Verde	41.24	38.07	38.73	39.64	.48	x	41.24	

=== Hammer throw ===
August 6

Rank	Name	Nationality	#1	#2	#3	#4	#5	#6	Result	Notes
1st place, gold medalist(s)	Yipsi Moreno	Cuba	71.06	69.88	x	70.72	x	x	71.06	
2nd place, silver medalist(s)	Berta Castells	Spain	x	61.05	64.96	x	61.49	64.70	64.96	
3rd place, bronze medalist(s)	Jennifer Dahlgren	Argentina	x	x	61.74	59.37	x	63.72	63.72	
4	Vânia Silva	Portugal	61.63	57.01	60.44	61.26	63.44	57.42	63.44	
5	Aldenay Vasallo	Cuba	61.48	x	x	60.51	x	62.65	62.65	
6	Amarilys Alméstica	Puerto Rico	61.99	x	x	x	x	61.40	61.99	
7	Violeta Guzmán	Mexico	59.57	x	60.58	x	x	55.70	60.58	
8	Sonia Alves	Portugal	x	x	59.14	x	55.31	58.53	59.14	
9	Karina Moya	Argentina	54.56	59.08	54.90				59.08	
10	Dolores Pedrares	Spain	58.97	x	57.86				58.97	
11	Josiane Soares	Brazil	55.33	57.39	56.51				57.39	
12	María García	Dominican Republic	57.32	x	x				57.32	
13	Nancy Guillén	El Salvador	x	53.75	56.95				56.95	
14	Katiuscia Borges	Brazil	53.91	55.02	53.72				55.02	
15	Odette Palma	Chile	52.27	x	53.98				53.98	
16	Adriana Benaventa	Venezuela	x	53.82	x				53.82	
17	Stefanía Zoryez	Uruguay	50.89	52.86	x				52.86	
18	Maria Antónia Borges	Cape Verde	x	34.00	36.38				36.38	
	Yunaika Crawford*	Cuba	x	70.28	x				70.28	
	Erika Melián*	Argentina	54.13	x	57.45				57.45	

=== Javelin throw ===
August 8

Rank	Name	Nationality	#1	#2	#3	#4	#5	#6	Result	Notes
1st place, gold medalist(s)	Osleidys Menéndez	Cuba	61.10	x	66.99	60.85	64.75	66.58	66.99	
2nd place, silver medalist(s)	Sonia Bisset	Cuba	60.69	59.63	60.89	x	64.71	x	64.71	
3rd place, bronze medalist(s)	Zuleima Araméndiz	Colombia	x	x	56.47	x	54.68	55.71	56.47	
4	Alessandra Resende	Brazil	x	51.29	x	55.23	x	51.20	55.23	
5	Mercedes Chilla	Spain	54.34	x	x	x	x	x	54.34	
6	Sabina Moya	Colombia	50.36	49.92	53.80	51.53	50.42	54.17	54.17	
7	Leryn Franco	Paraguay	46.47	48.54	50.00	48.15	47.55	48.75	50.00	
8	Idoia Mariezkurrena	Spain	46.08	43.71	47.00	47.53	45.86	x	47.53	
9	Sílvia Cruz	Portugal	46.45	x	46.70				46.70	
10	Romina Maggi	Argentina	x	45.14	46.25				46.25	
11	Naide Gomes	Portugal	38.46	35.94	35.86				38.46	
12	Indira Barbosa	Angola	34.22	x	x				34.22	
13	Sónia Borges	Cape Verde	32.65	33.54	32.63				33.54	
	Noraida Bicet*	Cuba	58.57	58.79	62.73				62.73	
	Ana Érika Gutierrez	Mexico							DNS	

=== Heptathlon ===
August 6–7

The highest mark recorded in each event is highlighted in yellow

Rank	Athlete	Nationality	100m H	HJ	SP	200m	LJ	JT	800m	Points	Notes
1st place, gold medalist(s)	María Peinado	Spain	13.62	1.70	12.41	25.76	6.12	41.40	2:20.29	5795	
2nd place, silver medalist(s)	Thaimara Rivas	Venezuela	14.54	1.70	12.60	26.02	5.88	41.08	2:23.72	5529	
3rd place, bronze medalist(s)	Carina Gomes	Portugal	14.78	1.61	10.30	26.36	5.56	40.41	2:18.76	5165	
4	Ana Capdevila	Spain	14.28	1.64	10.33	26.13	5.76	32.03	2:20.78	5164	
5	Melry Caldeira	Brazil	14.32	1.61	12.09	25.47	5.81	30.92	2:31.76	5149	
6	Valeria Steffens	Chile	16.08	1.58	11.68	27.03	4.99	36.04	2:27.18	4642	
	Ruth Unzú*	Spain	14.63	1.64	10.63	25.48	5.78	29.28	2:28.41	5047	
