= Romina Maggi =

Argentine javelin thrower

Romina Natalia Maggi (born 27 March 1976 in Rosario, Santa Fe) is an Argentine athlete who specialises in the javelin throw. She represented her country at the 2004 Summer Olympics failing to qualify for the final.

Her personal best of 56.18 metres, set in 2004, is the standing national record.

== Competition record ==
Year	Competition	Venue	Position	Event	Notes
Representing Argentina
1992	South American Youth Championships	Santiago, Chile	3rd	Javelin throw (old)	40.40 m
1994	South American Junior Championships	Santa Fe, Argentina	8th	Javelin throw (old)	40.54 m
1995	Pan American Junior Championships	Santiago, Chile	5th	Javelin throw (old)	48.92 m
1995	South American Junior Championships	Santiago, Chile	4th	Javelin throw (old)	45.32 m
1997	South American Championships	Mar del Plata, Argentina	5th	Javelin throw	48.24 m
1998	Ibero-American Championships	Lisbon, Portugal	4th	Javelin throw	48.52 m
2001	South American Championships	Manaus, Brazil	3rd	Javelin throw	48.90 m
2003	South American Championships	Barquisimeto, Venezuela	3rd	Javelin throw	52.36 m
2004	Ibero-American Championships	Huelva, Spain	10th	Javelin throw	46.25 m
2004	Olympic Games	Athens, Greece	43rd (q)	Javelin throw	48.58 m
2005	South American Championships	Cali, Colombia	3rd	Javelin throw	48.76 m
2006	South American Championships	Tunja, Colombia	4th	Javelin throw	49.46 m
2008	Ibero-American Championships	Iquique, Chile	5th	Javelin throw	48.54 m
2009	South American Championships	Lima, Peru	5th	Javelin throw	51.21 m
2010	Ibero-American Championships	San Fernando, Spain	4th	Javelin throw	50.81 m
2011	South American Championships	Buenos Aires, Argentina	8th	Javelin throw	47.26 m
