= Luiz Fernando da Silva =

Brazilian athlete (born 1971)

Personal information
- Born: 2 July 1971 (age 54)

Sport
- Sport: Track and field

Luiz Fernando da Silva (born 2 July 1971) is a Brazilian athlete who specialises in the javelin throw. He won multiple medals on the regional level.

His personal best in the event is 79.50 metres, first set in 2000, then repeated in 2003.

== Competition record ==
Year	Competition	Venue	Position	Event	Notes
Representing Brazil
1993	South American Championships	Lima, Peru	2nd	Javelin throw	70.56 m
1994	Ibero-American Championships	Mar del Plata, Argentina	4th	Javelin throw	68.96 m
1995	South American Championships	Manaus, Brazil	4th	Javelin throw	68.44 m
1996	Ibero-American Championships	Medellín, Colombia	7th	Javelin throw	65.68 m
1997	South American Championships	Mar del Plata, Argentina	2nd	Javelin throw	74.88 m
1997	Universiade	Catania, Italy	10th	Javelin throw	72.06 m
1998	Ibero-American Championships	Lisbon, Portugal	5th	Javelin throw	69.07 m
1999	South American Championships	Bogotá, Colombia	3rd	Javelin throw	73.57 m
2000	Ibero-American Championships	Rio de Janeiro, Brazil	4th	Javelin throw	71.92 m
2001	South American Championships	Manaus, Brazil	1st	Javelin throw	74.50 m
2002	Ibero-American Championships	Guatemala City, Guatemala	2nd	Javelin throw	74.66 m
2003	South American Championships	Barquisimeto, Venezuela	1st	Javelin throw	79.50 m
2003	Pan American Games	Santo Domingo, Dominican Republic	4th	Javelin throw	73.86 m
2004	Ibero-American Championships	Huelva, Spain	6th	Javelin throw	71.21 m
2005	South American Championships	Cali, Colombia	1st	Javelin throw	79.44 m
2006	Ibero-American Championships	Ponce, Puerto Rico	2nd	Javelin throw	73.83 m
2006	South American Championships	Tunja, Colombia	5th	Javelin throw	73.94 m
2009	South American Championships	Lima, Peru	4th	Javelin throw	72.54 m
2010	Ibero-American Championships	San Fernando, Spain	7th	Javelin throw	71.24 m
