= 1997 South American Championships in Athletics – Results =

These are the results of the 1997 South American Championships in Athletics which took place at the Estadio Municipal Teodoro Bronzini in Mar del Plata, Argentina, on 4, 5 and 6 April.

== Men's results ==
=== 100 metres ===
Heats – 4 April
Wind:
Heat 1: +2.1 m/s, Heat 2: +6.6 m/s

Rank	Heat	Name	Nationality	Time	Notes
1	2	Carlos Gats	Argentina	10.23	Q
2	2	André Domingos	Brazil	10.24	Q
3	2	Carlos Bernardo Moreno	Chile	10.42	Q
4	1	Sebastián Keitel	Chile	10.52	Q
5	2	Robinson Urrutia	Colombia	10.53	q
6	1	Gabriel Simón	Argentina	10.65	Q
7	1	Fernando Robledo	Colombia	10.69	Q
8	1	Heber Viera	Uruguay	10.77	
9	2	Rubén Techeira	Uruguay	10.85	q
10	1	Javier Verme	Peru	11.03	

Final – 4 April

Wind:+2.0 m/s

Rank	Name	Nationality	Time	Notes
1st place, gold medalist(s)	Sebastián Keitel	Chile	10.30	
2nd place, silver medalist(s)	André Domingos	Brazil	10.32	
3rd place, bronze medalist(s)	Carlos Gats	Argentina	10.46	
4	Carlos Bernardo Moreno	Chile	10.54	
5	Gabriel Simón	Argentina	10.61	
6	Fernando Robledo	Colombia	10.64	
7	Rubén Techeira	Uruguay	11.04	
	Robinson Urrutia	Colombia	DQ	

=== 200 metres ===
Heats – 5 April
Wind:
Heat 1: +2.5 m/s, Heat 2: -2.2 m/s

Rank	Heat	Name	Nationality	Time	Notes
1	1	Claudinei da Silva	Brazil	21.18	Q
2	2	Sebastián Keitel	Chile	21.53	Q
3	1	Carlos Bernardo Moreno	Chile	21.59	Q
4	2	Sidney de Souza	Brazil	21.65	Q
5	1	Carlos Gats	Argentina	21.80	Q
6	2	Guillermo Cacián	Argentina	22.14	Q
7	1	Javier Verme	Peru	22.30	q
8	2	José Luis Herrera	Colombia	22.32	q
9	2	Daniel Sarmiento	Uruguay	22.40	

Final – 6 April

Wind:-4.2 m/s

Rank	Name	Nationality	Time	Notes
1st place, gold medalist(s)	Claudinei da Silva	Brazil	21.06	
2nd place, silver medalist(s)	Sebastián Keitel	Chile	21.13	
3rd place, bronze medalist(s)	Sidney de Souza	Brazil	21.32	
4	Carlos Gats	Argentina	21.37	
5	Carlos Bernardo Moreno	Chile	21.67	
6	Guillermo Cacián	Argentina	21.77	
7	Javier Verme	Peru	23.31	
	José Luis Herrera	Colombia	DNS	

=== 400 metres ===
Heats – 4 April

Rank	Heat	Name	Nationality	Time	Notes
1	1	Sanderlei Parrela	Brazil	47.78	Q
2	2	Gustavo Aguirre	Argentina	48.28	Q
3	2	Inaldo Sena	Brazil	48.31	Q
4	1	Carlos Zbinden	Chile	48.35	Q
5	1	Wenceslao Ferrín	Colombia	48.40	Q
6	2	Julio César Rojas	Colombia	48.79	Q
7	1	Guillermo Cacián	Argentina	49.27	q
8	2	Ricardo Roach	Chile	49.61	q
9	1	Danielo Estefan	Uruguay	50.16	
10	2	Xavier Caicedo	Ecuador	50.72	
11	2	Sebastián Barrios	Uruguay	51.70	

Final – 4 April

Rank	Name	Nationality	Time	Notes
1st place, gold medalist(s)	Sanderlei Parrela	Brazil	46.17	
2nd place, silver medalist(s)	Carlos Zbinden	Chile	47.33	
3rd place, bronze medalist(s)	Gustavo Aguirre	Argentina	47.52	
4	Inaldo Sena	Brazil	47.57	
5	Wenceslao Ferrín	Colombia	47.71	
6	Julio César Rojas	Colombia	48.21	
7	Ricardo Roach	Chile	48.23	
8	Guillermo Cacián	Argentina	48.76	

=== 800 metres ===
6 April

Rank	Name	Nationality	Time	Notes
1st place, gold medalist(s)	Valdinei da Silva	Brazil	1:46.89	
2nd place, silver medalist(s)	Flávio Godoy	Brazil	1:48.50	
3rd place, bronze medalist(s)	Manuel Balmaceda	Chile	1:51.38	
4	Gabriel Guzmán	Argentina	1:51.94	
5	Rafael Iturrioz	Argentina	1:52.08	
6	Pablo Ramírez	Ecuador	1:52.79	
7	Danielo Estefan	Uruguay	1:53.63	
8	Rafael Scabino	Uruguay	1:53.90	

=== 1500 metres ===
4 April

Rank	Name	Nationality	Time	Notes
1st place, gold medalist(s)	Edgar de Oliveira	Brazil	3:49.76	
2nd place, silver medalist(s)	José Valente	Brazil	3:50.64	
3rd place, bronze medalist(s)	Pablo Ramírez	Ecuador	3:51.84	
4	Juan José Cruz	Argentina	3:52.60	
5	Cristian Rosales	Uruguay	3:52.76	
6	Darío Martínez	Argentina	3:56.79	
7	Néstor García	Uruguay	4:00.77	
8	Carlos Barrientos	Paraguay	4:09.62	

=== 5000 metres ===
6 April

Rank	Name	Nationality	Time	Notes
1st place, gold medalist(s)	Eduardo Carrasco	Chile	14:08.48	
2nd place, silver medalist(s)	Néstor García	Uruguay	14:15.56	
3rd place, bronze medalist(s)	Pedro Rojas	Colombia	14:17.48	
4	Cristian Rosales	Uruguay	14:20.53	
5	Juan José Cruz	Argentina	14:20.54	
6	Franklin Tenorio	Ecuador	14:20.58	
7	Edgar de Oliveira	Brazil	14:25.69	
8	Oscar Amaya	Argentina	14:27.04	
9	Agustín Morán	Panama	14:34.29	

=== 10,000 metres ===
4 April

Rank	Name	Nationality	Time	Notes
1st place, gold medalist(s)	Eduardo Carrasco	Chile	29:07.77	
2nd place, silver medalist(s)	Emerson Iser Bem	Brazil	29:10.67	
3rd place, bronze medalist(s)	Pedro Rojas	Colombia	29:11.74	
4	Franklin Tenorio	Ecuador	29:15.66	
5	José Montenegro	Argentina	29:31.61	
6	Agustín Morán	Panama	30:15.64	
7	Waldemar Cotelo	Uruguay	30:16.26	

=== 110 metres hurdles ===
4 April
Wind: +3.8 m/s

Rank	Name	Nationality	Time	Notes
1st place, gold medalist(s)	Emerson Perín	Brazil	14.21	
2nd place, silver medalist(s)	José Humberto Rivas	Colombia	14.29	
3rd place, bronze medalist(s)	Oscar Ratto	Argentina	14.64	
4	Gabriel Corradini	Argentina	14.90	

=== 400 metres hurdles ===
6 April

Rank	Name	Nationality	Time	Notes
1st place, gold medalist(s)	Eronilde de Araújo	Brazil	49.35	
2nd place, silver medalist(s)	Cleverson da Silva	Brazil	49.85	
3rd place, bronze medalist(s)	Carlos Zbinden	Chile	50.11	
4	Llimy Rivas	Colombia	51.29	
5	Ricardo D'Andrilli	Argentina	51.57	
6	Xavier Caicedo	Ecuador	53.05	

=== 3000 metres steeplechase ===
5 April

Rank	Name	Nationality	Time	Notes
1st place, gold medalist(s)	Wander Moura	Brazil	8:35.40	CR
2nd place, silver medalist(s)	Pablo Ramírez	Ecuador	8:48.50	NR
3rd place, bronze medalist(s)	Julián Peralta	Argentina	8:54.64	
4	Leonardo Ribas	Brazil	9:00.12	
5	Rogelio Fernández	Uruguay	9:08.09	
6	Héctor Aimar	Argentina	9:19.26	
7	Marcos Silva	Uruguay	9:35.10	

=== 4 × 100 metres relay ===
5 April

Rank	Nation	Competitors	Time	Notes
1st place, gold medalist(s)	Brazil	Emerson Perín, Nélson Carlos Ferreira, Sidney de Souza, Claudinei da Silva	40.07	
2nd place, silver medalist(s)	Chile	Pablo Almeida, Ricardo Roach, Sebastián Keitel, Carlos Bernardo Moreno	40.08	
3rd place, bronze medalist(s)	Argentina	Jorge Luis Polanco, Gabriel Simón, Guillermo Cacián, Carlos Gats	40.11	
4	Colombia	Robinson Urrutia, José Luis Herrera, Fernando Robledo, Wenceslao Ferrín	41.36	
5	Uruguay	Gustavo Alzugaray, Danielo Estefan, Rubén Techeira, Daniel Sarmiento	42.87	

=== 4 × 400 metres relay ===
6 April

Rank	Nation	Competitors	Time	Notes
1st place, gold medalist(s)	Brazil	Inaldo de Sena, Eronilde de Araújo, Valdinei da Silva, Sanderlei Parrela	3:04.20	
2nd place, silver medalist(s)	Chile	Carlos Bernardo Moreno, Ricardo Roach, Alejandro Krauss, Carlos Zbinden	3:07.98	
3rd place, bronze medalist(s)	Colombia	Fernando Robledo, Wenceslao Ferrín, Llimy Rivas, Julio César Rojas	3:09.10	
4	Argentina	Gabriel Guzmán, Ricardo D'Andrilli, Guillermo Cacián, Gustavo Aguirre	3:10.33	
5	Uruguay	Sebastián Barrios, Rafael Scabino, Zunino, Danielo Estefan	3:16.86	

=== 20,000 metres walk ===
5 April

Rank	Name	Nationality	Time	Notes
1st place, gold medalist(s)	Héctor Moreno	Colombia	1:23:06.73	CR
2nd place, silver medalist(s)	Sérgio Galdino	Brazil	1:23:28.06	
3rd place, bronze medalist(s)	Cláudio Bertolino	Brazil	1:28:02.74	
4	Jorge Loréfice	Argentina	1:28:03.9	
5	Jorge Yannone	Argentina	1:42:35.1	

=== High jump ===
5 April

Rank	Name	Nationality	Results	Notes
1st place, gold medalist(s)	Gilmar Mayo	Colombia	2.26	CR
2nd place, silver medalist(s)	Fabrício Romero	Brazil	2.15	
3rd place, bronze medalist(s)	Vagner Príncipe	Brazil	2.15	
4	Fernando Moreno	Argentina	2.10	
5	Erasmo Jara	Argentina	2.10	
6	Franco Moy	Peru	2.05	
7	José Barahona	Panama	2.05	
8	Víctor Betancour	Uruguay	2.05	
9	Alfredo Deza	Peru	2.05	
10	Enrique Vallory	Paraguay	1.95	

=== Pole vault ===
4 April

Rank	Name	Nationality	Results	Notes
1st place, gold medalist(s)	Oscar Veit	Argentina	4.85	
2nd place, silver medalist(s)	Fernando Pastoriza	Argentina	4.80	
3rd place, bronze medalist(s)	Sebastián Ortiz	Uruguay	4.70	
4	Cristian Aspillaga	Chile	4.60	
5	Igor Castillo	Peru	4.50	
6	Gustavo Alzugaray	Uruguay	4.50	
7	Gustavo Rehder	Brazil	4.40	
8	Francisco León	Peru	4.20	

=== Long jump ===
4 April

Rank	Name	Nationality	Results	Notes
1st place, gold medalist(s)	Nélson Carlos Ferreira	Brazil	7.84	
2nd place, silver medalist(s)	Márcio da Cruz	Brazil	7.59	
3rd place, bronze medalist(s)	Yessid Cossio	Colombia	7.32	
4	Diego Vázquez	Argentina	6.90	
5	Pablo Armando Silva	Argentina	6.73	

=== Triple jump ===
6 April

Rank	Name	Nationality	Results	Notes
1st place, gold medalist(s)	Anísio Silva	Brazil	16.24	
2nd place, silver medalist(s)	Márcio Cardoso	Brazil	15.89	
3rd place, bronze medalist(s)	Alejandro Gats	Argentina	14.99	
4	Leandro Simes	Argentina	14.67	
5	Franco Moy	Peru	14.37w	

=== Shot put ===
4 April

Rank	Name	Nationality	Results	Notes
1st place, gold medalist(s)	Édson Miguel	Brazil	17.44	
2nd place, silver medalist(s)	Marco Antonio Verni	Chile	16.82	
3rd place, bronze medalist(s)	Andrés Solo de Zaldívar	Chile	15.74	
4	Adrián Marzo	Argentina	15.45	
5	Marcelo Pugliese	Argentina	15.30	
6	Juan Tello	Peru	14.21	

=== Discus throw ===
6 April

Rank	Name	Nationality	Results	Notes
1st place, gold medalist(s)	Ramón Jiménez Gaona	Paraguay	57.32	
2nd place, silver medalist(s)	Marcelo Pugliese	Argentina	54.18	
3rd place, bronze medalist(s)	Julio César Piñero	Argentina	53.00	
4	Édson Miguel	Brazil	52.02	
5	Andrés Solo de Zaldívar	Chile	48.96	
6	Marco Antonio Verni	Chile	48.56	
7	Dante Yorges	Peru	47.26	
8	Juan Tello	Peru	47.04	

=== Hammer throw ===
4 April

Rank	Name	Nationality	Results	Notes
1st place, gold medalist(s)	Juan Ignacio Cerra	Argentina	68.92	
2nd place, silver medalist(s)	Adrián Marzo	Argentina	66.36	
3rd place, bronze medalist(s)	Eduardo Acuña	Peru	58.44	
4	José Manuel Llano	Chile	57.20	
5	Mario Leme	Brazil	56.86	
6	Pedro Atilio	Brazil	56.70	

=== Javelin throw ===
5 April

Rank	Name	Nationality	Results	Notes
1st place, gold medalist(s)	Nery Kennedy	Paraguay	75.08	
2nd place, silver medalist(s)	Luiz Fernando da Silva	Brazil	74.88	
3rd place, bronze medalist(s)	Luis Lucumí	Colombia	74.00	
4	Edgar Baumann	Paraguay	72.18	
5	Marcos Vieira	Brazil	70.62	
6	Rodrigo Zelaya	Chile	69.70	
7	Mauricio Silva	Argentina	63.76	
8	Michael Musselmann	Peru	61.46	
9	Néstor Giménez	Argentina	59.66	

=== Decathlon ===
4–5 April

The highest mark recorded in each event is highlighted in yellow

Rank	Athlete	Nationality	100m	LJ	SP	HJ	400m	110m H	DT	PV	JT	1500m	Points	Notes
1st place, gold medalist(s)	Alejandro Acosta	Argentina	11.45w	16.87w	9.94	1.94	53.93	15.37w	30.60	4.20	43.64	4:40.66	6546	
2nd place, silver medalist(s)	Santiago Lorenzo	Argentina	11.52w	6.01w	11.10	1.82	50.46	16.22w	30.84	4.00	52.22	4:36.98	6495	
3rd place, bronze medalist(s)	Alexis Recioy	Uruguay	11.09w	6.81w	10.29	1.85	50.69	15.93w	31.48	3.90	44.36	5:04.08	6433	
	Emerson Vianna	Brazil	11.66w	6.59	DNS	–	–	–	–	–	–	–	DNF	

== Women's results ==
=== 100 metres ===
4 April
Wind: +4.5 m/s

Rank	Name	Nationality	Time	Notes
1st place, gold medalist(s)	Lucimar de Moura	Brazil	11.47	
2nd place, silver medalist(s)	Felipa Palacios	Colombia	11.48	
3rd place, bronze medalist(s)	Zandra Borrero	Colombia	11.75	
4	Kátia Regina Santos	Brazil	11.88	
5	Marcela Tiscornia	Uruguay	11.94	
6	Ana Mariuxi Caicedo	Ecuador	12.01	
7	Vanesa Wohlgemuth	Argentina	12.03	
8	Claudia Acerenza	Uruguay	12.36	

=== 200 metres ===
6 April
Wind: -0.8 m/s

Rank	Name	Nationality	Time	Notes
1st place, gold medalist(s)	Felipa Palacios	Colombia	23.20	CR
2nd place, silver medalist(s)	Lucimar de Moura	Brazil	23.51	
3rd place, bronze medalist(s)	Olga Conte	Argentina	23.90	
4	Mirtha Brock	Colombia	24.19	
5	Marcela Tiscornia	Uruguay	24.41	
6	Kátia Regina Santos	Brazil	24.75	
7	Daniela Lebreo	Argentina	24.83	
8	Mónica Castro	Chile	25.06	

=== 400 metres ===
4 April

Rank	Name	Nationality	Time	Notes
1st place, gold medalist(s)	Olga Conte	Argentina	53.41	
2nd place, silver medalist(s)	Maria Magnólia Figueiredo	Brazil	53.49	
3rd place, bronze medalist(s)	Norfalia Carabalí	Colombia	54.47	
4	Janeth Lucumí	Colombia	55.92	
5	Claudete Alves Pina	Brazil	56.55	
6	Daniela Lebreo	Argentina	58.02	
7	Ondina Rodríguez	Ecuador	1:01.21	
8	Macarena Darias	Uruguay	1:01.74	

=== 800 metres ===
Heats – 5 April

Rank	Heat	Name	Nationality	Time	Notes
1	1	Luciana Mendes	Brazil	2:09.63	Q
2	2	Fátima dos Santos	Brazil	2:10.85	Q
3	2	Mercy Colorado	Ecuador	2:10.86	Q
4	2	Silvia dos Santos Coelho	Argentina	2:12.65	Q
5	2	Janeth Lucumí	Colombia	2:12.85	q
6	2	Patricia Martínez	Peru	2:13.05	q
7	1	Niusha Mancilla	Bolivia	2:13.29	Q
8	1	Paula Tello	Argentina	2:13.64	Q
9	1	Clara Morales	Chile	2:14.17	
10	1	Faustina Huamaní	Peru	2:16.75	
11	2	Macarena Darias	Uruguay	2:17.22	

Final – 6 April

Rank	Name	Nationality	Time	Notes
1st place, gold medalist(s)	Luciana Mendes	Brazil	2:03.56	
2nd place, silver medalist(s)	Mercy Colorado	Ecuador	2:06.90	NR
3rd place, bronze medalist(s)	Fátima dos Santos	Brazil	2:09.08	
4	Niusha Mancilla	Bolivia	2:10.28	
5	Paula Tello	Argentina	2:12.55	
6	Silvia dos Santos Coelho	Argentina	2:15.61	
7	Patricia Martínez	Peru	2:16.97	
	Janeth Lucumí	Colombia	DNS	

=== 1500 metres ===
4 April

Rank	Name	Nationality	Time	Notes
1st place, gold medalist(s)	Janeth Caizalitín	Ecuador	4:33.65	
2nd place, silver medalist(s)	Niusha Mancilla	Bolivia	4:34.90	
3rd place, bronze medalist(s)	Celia dos Santos	Brazil	4:35.29	
4	Clara Morales	Chile	4:35.41	
5	Elisa Cobañea	Argentina	4:37.81	
6	María de los Angeles Peralta	Argentina	4:39.40	
7	Mercy Colorado	Ecuador	4:41.72	
8	Faustina Huamaní	Peru	4:44.93	
9	Stella Castro	Colombia	4:54.03	

=== 5000 metres ===
6 April

Rank	Name	Nationality	Time	Notes
1st place, gold medalist(s)	Stella Castro	Colombia	15:48.82	CR, NR
2nd place, silver medalist(s)	Érika Olivera	Chile	15:52.27	
3rd place, bronze medalist(s)	Elisa Cobañea	Argentina	16:05.51	
4	Janeth Caizalitín	Ecuador	16:54.93	
5	Marisa da Silva	Brazil	17:24.75	

=== 10,000 metres ===
4 April

Rank	Name	Nationality	Time	Notes
1st place, gold medalist(s)	Stella Castro	Colombia	33:24.07	CR
2nd place, silver medalist(s)	Érika Olivera	Chile	33:56.98	
3rd place, bronze medalist(s)	Mónica Cervera	Argentina	36:39.25	
4	Florinda Camayo	Peru	36:57.36	
5	Rita López	Argentina	37:36.52	

=== 100 metres hurdles ===
4 April
Wind: +8.0 m/s

Rank	Name	Nationality	Time	Notes
1st place, gold medalist(s)	Verónica de Paoli	Argentina	13.41	
2nd place, silver medalist(s)	Maurren Maggi	Brazil	13.65	
3rd place, bronze medalist(s)	Vânia Amorim dos Santos	Brazil	13.95	
4	Andrea Ávila	Argentina	14.48	

=== 400 metres hurdles ===
6 April

Rank	Name	Nationality	Time	Notes
1st place, gold medalist(s)	Verónica de Paoli	Argentina	58.05	
2nd place, silver medalist(s)	Maria dos Santos	Brazil	59.62	
3rd place, bronze medalist(s)	Marise da Silva	Brazil	1:00.00	
4	María Fernanda de Bastos	Argentina	1:02.43	
5	Ondina Rodríguez	Ecuador	1:04.84	

=== 4 × 100 metres relay ===
5 April

Rank	Nation	Competitors	Time	Notes
1st place, gold medalist(s)	Colombia	Norfalia Carabalí, Felipa Palacios, Zandra Borrero, Mirtha Brock	44.58	CR
2nd place, silver medalist(s)	Brazil	Kátia Regina Santos, Maria Magnólia Figueiredo, Claudete Alves Pina, Lucimar de Moura	45.21	
3rd place, bronze medalist(s)	Argentina	Daniela Lebreo, Verónica De Paoli, Vanesa Wohlgemuth, Olga Conte	46.18	
4	Uruguay	Pintos, Claudia Acerenza, Alejandra Monza, Marcela Tiscornia	47.72	

=== 4 × 400 metres relay ===
6 April

Rank	Nation	Competitors	Time	Notes
1st place, gold medalist(s)	Colombia	Mirtha Brock, Norfalia Carabalí, Janeth Lucumí, Felipa Palacios	3:36.71	
2nd place, silver medalist(s)	Brazil	Luciana Mendes, Claudete Alves Pina, Fátima dos Santos, Maria Magnólia Figueiredo	3:38.18	
3rd place, bronze medalist(s)	Argentina	Daniela Lebreo, Marina Arias, Verónica De Paoli, Olga Conte	3:40.72	
4	Uruguay	Alejandra Monza, Macarena Darias, Claudia Acerenza, Marcela Tiscornia	3:55.85	

=== 10,000 metres walk ===
5 April

Rank	Name	Nationality	Time	Notes
1st place, gold medalist(s)	Geovana Irusta	Bolivia	46:01.06	CR
2nd place, silver medalist(s)	Miriam Ramón	Ecuador	46:50.57	
3rd place, bronze medalist(s)	Bertha Vera	Ecuador	47:15.90	
4	Liliana Bermeo	Colombia	47:40.75	
5	Ángela Aliaga	Bolivia	47:49.12	
6	Gianetti Bonfim	Brazil	48:25.83	
7	Nailze de Azevedo	Brazil	48:53.68	
8	Lidia Carriego	Argentina	52:48.30	
9	Ofelia Puyol	Argentina	56:08.83	

=== High jump ===
5 April

Rank	Name	Nationality	Results	Notes
1st place, gold medalist(s)	Solange Witteveen	Argentina	1.89	=CR
2nd place, silver medalist(s)	Delfina Blaquier	Argentina	1.83	
2nd place, silver medalist(s)	Orlane dos Santos	Brazil	1.83	
4	Luciane Dambacher	Brazil	1.76	
5	Lorena Diosy	Uruguay	1.73	

=== Pole vault ===
6 April

Rank	Name	Nationality	Results	Notes
1st place, gold medalist(s)	Déborah Gyurcsek	Uruguay	3.85	CR, AR
2nd place, silver medalist(s)	Alejandra García	Argentina	3.50	
3rd place, bronze medalist(s)	Mariela Laurora	Argentina	3.45	
4	María José Torrealba	Chile	3.10	
5	Viviane Pandolfo	Brazil	3.00	
6	Patricia Jiacomussi	Brazil	3.00	

=== Long jump ===
4 April

Rank	Name	Nationality	Results	Notes
1st place, gold medalist(s)	Maurren Maggi	Brazil	6.54	
2nd place, silver medalist(s)	Andrea Ávila	Argentina	6.26w	
3rd place, bronze medalist(s)	Mónica Falcioni	Uruguay	6.25w	
4	Luciana dos Santos	Brazil	6.16w	
5	Gilda Massa	Peru	5.99w	
6	Mónica Castro	Chile	5.94w	
7	Alejandra Quiñones	Colombia	5.48w	
8	Sabine Stegmuller	Argentina	5.47w	
9	Erika Varillas	Peru	5.15w	
10	Alejandra Monza	Uruguay	5.08	

=== Triple jump ===
6 April

Rank	Name	Nationality	Results	Notes
1st place, gold medalist(s)	Andrea Ávila	Argentina	13.76	
2nd place, silver medalist(s)	Maria de Souza	Brazil	13.72	
3rd place, bronze medalist(s)	Luciana dos Santos	Brazil	13.30	
4	Mónica Falcioni	Uruguay	12.94	
5	Clara Córdoba	Colombia	12.40	
6	Silvina Boretto	Argentina	12.12w	
7	Ana Mariuxi Caicedo	Ecuador	12.01	

=== Shot put ===
4 April

Rank	Name	Nationality	Results	Notes
1st place, gold medalist(s)	Elisângela Adriano	Brazil	18.16	CR
2nd place, silver medalist(s)	Alexandra Amaro	Brazil	16.34	
3rd place, bronze medalist(s)	Silvana Filippi	Argentina	13.81	
4	Zorobabelia Córdoba	Colombia	12.71	
5	Ana Cuastumal	Ecuador	11.78	
6	Marisol Bengoa	Chile	11.64	
7	María Fernanda Wals	Argentina	11.59	
8	Karina Cordova	Peru	11.39	

=== Discus throw ===
6 April

Rank	Name	Nationality	Results	Notes
1st place, gold medalist(s)	Elisângela Adriano	Brazil	58.46	CR
2nd place, silver medalist(s)	Liliana Martinelli	Argentina	52.26	
3rd place, bronze medalist(s)	María Eugenia Giggi	Argentina	45.80	
4	Maria Ines Pacheco	Brazil	43.68	
5	Marisol Bengoa	Chile	43.52	
6	Ana Cuastumal	Ecuador	30.64	

=== Hammer throw ===
4 April

Rank	Name	Nationality	Results	Notes
1st place, gold medalist(s)	María Eugenia Villamizar	Colombia	55.48	
2nd place, silver medalist(s)	Karina Moya	Argentina	54.30	
3rd place, bronze medalist(s)	Zulma Lambert	Argentina	50.64	
4	Maria Ines Pacheco	Brazil	49.12	
5	Josiane Soares	Brazil	48.48	
6	Ana Cuastumal	Ecuador	44.66	
7	Karina Cordova	Peru	40.56	

=== Javelin throw ===
4 April

Rank	Name	Nationality	Results	Notes
1st place, gold medalist(s)	Zuleima Araméndiz	Colombia	56.66	
2nd place, silver medalist(s)	Sabina Moya	Colombia	55.30	
3rd place, bronze medalist(s)	Andrea Arch	Argentina	54.08	
4	Alessandra Resende	Brazil	50.54	
5	Romina Maggi	Argentina	48.24	
6	Carla Bispo	Brazil	48.04	

=== Heptathlon ===
4–5 April

The highest mark recorded in each event is highlighted in yellow

Rank	Athlete	Nationality	100m H	HJ	SP	200m	LJ	JT	800m	Points	Notes
1st place, gold medalist(s)	Euzinete dos Reis	Brazil	14.47	1.61	11.38	25.27w	5.88w	45.20	2:19.73	5549	
2nd place, silver medalist(s)	Zorobabelia Córdoba	Colombia	15.04	1.61	12.56	25.96w	5.79	53.30	2:34.60	5428	
3rd place, bronze medalist(s)	Joelma Souza	Brazil	15.74	1.73	12.15	26.40w	5.35w	39.18	DNF	4380	
4	Verónica Domínguez	Argentina	15.85	1.55	6.98	27.73w	4.70	20.12	2:37.35	3771	
