= Valdinei da Silva =

Brazilian sprinter (born 1972)

Personal information
- Full name: Valdinei Abilio da Silva
- Nationality: Brazilian
- Born: 29 March 1972 (age 54)
- Height: 1.80 m (5 ft 11 in)
- Weight: 71 kg (157 lb)

Sport
- Sport: Sprinting
- Event: 400 metres
- Club: União Esportiva Funilense

Valdinei Abilio da Silva (born 29 March 1972) is a Brazilian sprinter. He competed in the men's 400 metres at the 1996 Summer Olympics.

== International competitions ==
Year	Competition	Venue	Position	Event	Notes
Representing Brazil
1996	Ibero-American Championships	Medellín, Colombia	2nd	800 m	3:04.28
1996	Olympic Games	Atlanta, United States	39th (h)	400 m	46.61
1996	Olympic Games	Atlanta, United States	11th (sf)	4 × 400 m relay	3:03.46
1997	World Indoor Championships	Paris, France	26th (h)	400 m	48.19
1997	South American Championships	Mar del Plata, Argentina	1st	800 m	1:46.89
1997	South American Championships	Mar del Plata, Argentina	1st	4 × 400 m relay	3:04.20
2000	Ibero-American Championships	Rio de Janeiro, Brazil	1st	4 × 400 m relay	3:03.33
2001	South American Championships	Manaus, Brazil	2nd	400 m	46.50
2001	South American Championships	Manaus, Brazil	2nd	4 × 400 m relay	3:06.64
2001	World Championships	Edmonton, Canada	4th	4 × 400 m relay	3:01.09
2004	Ibero-American Championships	Huelva, Spain	11th (h)	800 m	1:52.17
2004	Ibero-American Championships	Huelva, Spain	2nd	4 × 400 m relay	3:06.19
