= Déborah Gyurcsek =

Uruguayan pole vaulter

Personal information
- Born: 7 December 1978 (age 47)

Sport
- Sport: Track and field
Medal record
Representing Uruguay
Pan American Games
Bronze medal – third place	1999 Winnipeg	Pole vault
South American Games
Silver medal – second place	1998 Cuenca	Pole vault

Déborah Gyurcsek Olivera (born December 7, 1978) is a female track and field athlete from Uruguay, who competes in the pole vault event. She competed at the 2000 Summer Olympics and she won the bronze medal at the 1999 Pan American Games in Winnipeg, Manitoba, Canada. Her personal best is 4.23 metres achieved in 2000.

== Achievements ==
Year	Competition	Venue	Position	Notes
Representing Uruguay
1997	South American Championships	Mar del Plata, Argentina	1st	3.85 m (CR)
1997	South American Junior Championships	San Carlos, Uruguay	1st	3.60 m
1998	Ibero-American Championships	Lisbon, Portugal	3rd	3.55 m
1998	South American Games	Cuenca, Ecuador	2nd	4.00 m
1999	South American Championships	Bogotá, Colombia	2nd	3.75 m
1999	Pan American Games	Winnipeg, Canada	3rd	4.15 m
2000	Olympic Games	Sydney, Australia	21st (q)	4.15 m
2001	World Championships	Edmonton, Canada	–	NM
2002	Ibero-American Championships	Guatemala City, Guatemala	5th	3.70 m
2003	South American Championships	Barquisimeto, Venezuela	4th	3.90 m
2003	Pan American Games	Santo Domingo, Dominican Republic	10th	3.60 m
2004	Ibero-American Championships	Huelva, Spain	7th	4.00 m
2007	Pan American Games	Rio de Janeiro, Brazil	7th	3.75 m
2010	Ibero-American Championships	San Fernando, Spain	8th	3.60 m
2011	Pan American Games	Guadalajara, Mexico	12th	3.70 m
