= Luciana dos Santos =

Brazilian athlete

Personal information
- Born: 10 February 1970 (age 56) Ilhéus, Brazil

Sport
- Sport: Track and field

Luciana Alves dos Santos (born 10 February 1970) is a Brazilian long jumper, triple jumper and sprinter.

She was born in Ilhéus. She competed in the long jump at the World Championships in 1997 and 1999, and in both events at the 2000 Summer Olympics, but without reaching the final. At the 2004 Olympics she competed in the 4 x 100 metre relay.

She has four Brazilian titles; one in the long jump from 1996 and three in the triple jump from 1999, 2000 and 2001. Her main rivals were Maria de Souza and Maurren Higa Maggi. On the regional level, she has eleven medals in the individual events from the South American Championships in 1991, 1995, 1997, 1999, 2001, 2003 and 2005.

Her personal best jump is 6.66 metres, achieved in June 2007 in La Paz. This is a former South American record. She has 6.81 metres in the long jump, achieved in June 1999 in Bogotá; and 11.40 seconds metres in the 100 metres, achieved in May 2004 in Cochabamba.

== Competition record ==
Year	Competition	Venue	Position	Event	Notes
Representing Brazil
1989	South American Junior Championships	Montevideo, Uruguay	3rd	Long jump	5.64 m
1991	South American Championships	Manaus, Brazil	2nd	Long jump	5.78 m
1994	Ibero-American Championships	Mar del Plata, Argentina	2nd	Long jump	6.18 m (+0.7 m/s)
1994	Ibero-American Championships	Mar del Plata, Argentina	2nd	Triple jump	12.90 m w (+4.6 m/s)
1995	South American Championships	Manaus, Brazil	2nd	Long jump	6.16 m
1995	South American Championships	Manaus, Brazil	2nd	Triple jump	13.07 m
1995	Universiade	Fukuoka, Japan	11th	Long jump	5.80 m
1996	Ibero-American Championships	Medellín, Colombia	3rd	Long jump	6.24 m
1997	South American Championships	Mar del Plata, Argentina	4th	Long jump	6.16 m (w)
1997	South American Championships	Mar del Plata, Argentina	3rd	Triple jump	13.30 m
1997	World Championships	Athens, Greece	35th (q)	Long jump	5.92 m
1997	Universiade	Catania, Italy	6th	4 × 100 m relay	46.31 s
1997	Universiade	Catania, Italy	16th (q)	Triple jump	13.28 m
1999	South American Championships	Bogotá, Colombia	2nd	Long jump	6.81 m
1999	South American Championships	Bogotá, Colombia	1st	Triple jump	13.90 m
1999	Pan American Games	Winnipeg, Canada	8th	Long jump	6.13 m
1999	World Championships	Seville, Spain	31st (q)	Long jump	6.00 m
2000	Ibero-American Championships	Rio de Janeiro, Brazil	3rd	Long jump	6.28 m
2000	Ibero-American Championships	Rio de Janeiro, Brazil	2nd	Triple jump	13.46 m
2000	Olympic Games	Sydney, Australia	–	Long jump	NM
2000	Olympic Games	Sydney, Australia	24th (q)	Triple jump	13.48 m
2001	South American Championships	Manaus, Brazil	2nd	Long jump	6.10 m
2001	South American Championships	Manaus, Brazil	2nd	Triple jump	13.48 m
2002	Ibero-American Championships	Guatemala City, Guatemala	3rd	Triple jump	13.53
2003	South American Championships	Barquisimeto, Venezuela	9th	Long jump	5.36 m
2003	South American Championships	Barquisimeto, Venezuela	2nd	Triple jump	13.42 m
2004	South American U23 Championships	Barquisimeto, Venezuela	2nd	4 × 100 m relay	43.49
2004	Ibero-American Championships	Huelva, Spain	3rd	4 × 100 m relay	44.13
2004	Ibero-American Championships	Huelva, Spain	5th	Long jump	6.34 m
2004	Olympic Games	Athens, Greece	9th (h)	4 × 100 m relay	43.12
2005	South American Championships	Cali, Colombia	3rd	100 m	11.46
2005	South American Championships	Cali, Colombia	2nd	4 × 100 m relay	44.35
2005	South American Championships	Cali, Colombia	1st	Long jump	6.39 m
2005	World Championships	Helsinki, Finland	5th	4 × 100 m relay	42.99
2006	Ibero-American Championships	Ponce, Puerto Rico	2nd	Long jump	6.25 m
2007	South American Championships	São Paulo, Brazil	1st	4 × 100 m relay	43.54
2007	Pan American Games	Rio de Janeiro, Brazil	20th (h)	100 m	11.82
2007	Pan American Games	Rio de Janeiro, Brazil	6th	4 × 100 m relay	44.14
2007	World Championships	Osaka, Japan	15th (h)	4 × 100 m relay	44.64
2008	Ibero-American Championships	Iquique, Chile	2nd	4 × 100 m relay	44.99
