= Ricardo Roach =

Chilean sprinter (born 1972)

Personal information
- Born: 12 October 1972 (age 53) Santiago, Chile

Sport
- Sport: Track and field
Medal record
Representing Chile
South American Games
Gold medal – first place	1994 Valencia	4x100m relay
Gold medal – first place	1994 Valencia	4x400m relay
Gold medal – first place	1998 Cuenca	100m
Gold medal – first place	1998 Cuenca	200m
Silver medal – second place	1998 Cuenca	4x100m relay

Ricardo Adrián Roach González (born 12 October 1972) is a retired Chilean athlete who specialised in the sprinting events. He represented his country in the 200 metres at the 2000 Summer Olympics, as well as 1995 and 1999 World Championships failing to reach the second round. In addition, he won several medals at regional level.

He has a twin brother, Rodrigo Roach, who was also a sprinter.

== Competition record ==
Year	Competition	Venue	Position	Event	Notes
Representing Chile
1994	Ibero-American Championships	Mar del Plata, Argentina	4th	400 m	48.00
1994	Ibero-American Championships	Mar del Plata, Argentina	—	4x100 m relay	DNF
1994	Ibero-American Championships	Mar del Plata, Argentina	4th	4x400 m relay	3:08.27
1994	South American Games	Valencia, Venezuela	6th	100 m	10.58
1994	South American Games	Valencia, Venezuela	1st	4x100 m relay	39.67
1994	South American Games	Valencia, Venezuela	1st	4x400 m relay	3:06.92
1995	South American Championships	Manaus, Brazil	4th	200 m	21.35
1995	South American Championships	Manaus, Brazil	4th	400 m	47.33
1995	South American Championships	Manaus, Brazil	4th	4x100 m relay	41.38
1995	South American Championships	Manaus, Brazil	3rd	4x400 m relay	3:11.83
1995	World Championships	Gothenburg, Sweden	61st (h)	200 m	21.65
1995	Universiade	Fukuoka, Japan	22nd (qf)	200 m	21.55
1997	South American Championships	Mar del Plata, Argentina	7th	400 m	48.23
1997	South American Championships	Mar del Plata, Argentina	2nd	4x100 m relay	40.08
1997	South American Championships	Mar del Plata, Argentina	2nd	4x400 m relay	3:07.98
1997	Universiade	Catania, Italy	57th (h)	100 m	11.36
1997	Universiade	Catania, Italy	16th (qf)	200 m	21.28
1998	Ibero-American Championships	Lisbon, Portugal	5th	400 m	47.29
1998	South American Games	Cuenca, Ecuador	1st	100 m	10.36 A
1998	South American Games	Cuenca, Ecuador	1st	200 m	20.4 A
1998	South American Games	Cuenca, Ecuador	2nd	4x100 m relay	40.63
1999	South American Championships	Bogotá, Colombia	4th	100 m	10.21 A
1999	South American Championships	Bogotá, Colombia	2nd	200 m	20.59 A
1999	South American Championships	Bogotá, Colombia	3rd	4x100 m relay	39.98 A
1999	Universiade	Palma de Mallorca, Spain	9th (sf)	200 m	21.93
1999	Pan American Games	Winnipeg, Canada	17th (h)	100 m	10.69
1999	World Championships	Seville, Spain	50th (h)	200 m	21.13
2000	Ibero-American Championships	Rio de Janeiro, Brazil	6th	200 m	21.39
2000	Ibero-American Championships	Rio de Janeiro, Brazil	3rd	4x100 m relay	39.90
2000	Ibero-American Championships	Rio de Janeiro, Brazil	2nd	4x400 m relay	3:10.86
2000	Olympic Games	Sydney, Australia	49th (h)	200 m	21.20
2000	Olympic Games	Sydney, Australia	34th (h)	4x100 m relay	40.20
2001	South American Championships	Manaus, Brazil	4th (h)	200 m	21.28
2001	South American Championships	Manaus, Brazil	5th	4x100 m relay	42.06
2002	Ibero-American Championships	Guatemala City, Guatemala	3rd	400 m	46.37 A
2003	South American Championships	Barquisimeto, Venezuela	5th	200 m	21.29
2003	South American Championships	Barquisimeto, Venezuela	3rd	4x100 m relay	40.04

== Personal bests ==
- 100 metres – 10.21 (+0.9 m/s) (Bogotá 1999)
- 200 metres – 20.60 (+1.3 m/s) (Santiago 1998)
- 400 metres – 45.92 (Santiago 1998) NR
