= Athletics at the 1999 Pan American Games – Women's pole vault =

Women's pole vault at the Pan American Games

The women's pole vault event at the 1999 Pan American Games was held on July 25. It was the first time that this event was contested at the Pan American Games.

== Results ==
Rank	Name	Nationality	3.50	3.60	3.70	3.80	3.90	3.95	4.00	4.05	4.10	4.15	4.20	4.25	4.30	4.42	Result	Notes
1st place, gold medalist(s)	Alejandra García	Argentina	–	–	–	–	–	–	o	o	o	o	o	o	xo	xxx	4.30	GR
2nd place, silver medalist(s)	Kellie Suttle	United States	–	–	–	–	–	o	xo	o	o	xo	xo	o	xxx		4.25	
3rd place, bronze medalist(s)	Déborah Gyurcsek	Uruguay	–	–	o	xo	o	o	o	xo	o	xo	xxx				4.15	NR
4	Kimberly Becker	United States	–	–	–	o	xxo	–	xxx								3.90	
5	Rebecca Chambers	Canada	–	xo	o	o	xxo	–	xxx								3.90	
6	Trista Bernier	Canada	–	o	xo	xxx											3.70	
7	Lorena Espinoza	Mexico	xo	o	xxx												3.60	
8	Alejandra Meza	Mexico	xo	xxo	xxx												3.60	
9	Fabiana Murer	Brazil	xo	xxx													3.50	
	Jill Wittenwyler	United States															DNS	
