= 2000 Ibero-American Championships in Athletics =

IX Ibero-American Championships
- Dates: 20 & 21 May
- Host city: Rio de Janeiro, Brazil
- Venue: Estádio Célio de Barros
- Events: 44
- Participation: 297 athletes from 20 nations
- Records set: 8 championship records

The 2000 Ibero-American Championships in Athletics (Spanish: IX Campeonato Iberoamericano de Atletismo) was the ninth edition of the international athletics competition between Ibero-American nations which was held at the Estádio Célio de Barros in Rio de Janeiro, Brazil on 20 and 21 May. With a total of 308 athletes, the number of competitors was the lowest since 1990. The Spanish team (29 athletes) was much smaller than previous delegations as most of the Spaniards chose to focus on the 2000 Sydney Olympics instead. Other national teams used the competition as a chance to gain an Olympic qualifying mark.

The host nation Brazil easily topped the medal table by winning 18 gold medals and a total haul of 45 medals. The next best performing nation was Spain, which took six golds and 21 medals during the two-day championships. Cuba and Colombia won five golds each, while Argentina and Mexico had the third and fourth largest totals, with eleven and ten medals respectively. Fourteen of the 20 nations that participated reached the medal podium.

Brazil dominated the men's track events and Hudson de Souza completed an 800/1500 metres double. Cuban men provided the highlights of the men's field events, where Michael Calvo won the triple jump with a jump of 17.05 m and Emeterio González had a javelin throw over eighty metres (both championship marks). In the women's track events, reigning Olympic champion Fernanda Ribeiro broke the 5000 m championship record and Soraya Telles became the first female Ibero-American champion in the steeplechase (a contest which meant that the 44-event programme was equal between the sexes for the first time). The 10,000 m track walk saw Rosario Sánchez knock almost a minute of the meet record, while runner-up Geovana Irusta set a South American record behind her.

Although the level of performances was generally lower than at earlier editions, eight championships records were set. Two national records were also beaten; Elena Guerra improved the 1500 m Uruguayan record and Érika Olivera set a new Chilean record for the 5000 metres. The Brazilian men's 4×100 m relay team gave the performance of the competition with their winning time of 38.24 seconds, which was a South American record and an Ibero-American record.

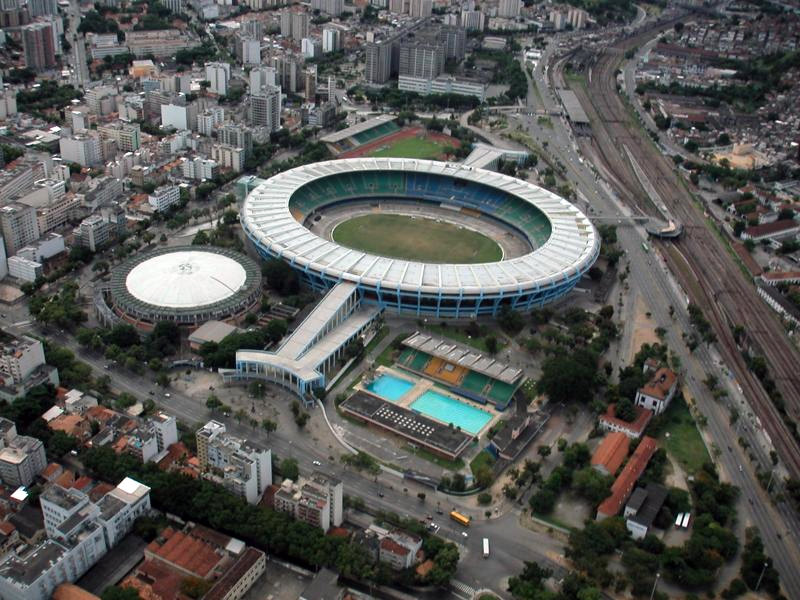
The host athletics stadium (centre top) seen as part of the Maracanã Sports Complex

Several athletes present at the competition went on to win medals on the Olympic stage later that year: Mexican Noé Hernández won the 20 km walk silver medal, Fernanda Ribeiro took an Olympic bronze over 10,000 m, while both the Brazilian and Cuban 4×100 m relay teams reached the Olympic podium. Future world champion Naide Gomes won São Tomé and Príncipe's first ever medal with her runner-up performance in the heptathlon.

== Medal summary ==
=== Men ===
Event	Gold		Silver		Bronze	
100 metres	Vicente de Lima (BRA)	10.28	Luis Alberto Pérez-Rionda (CUB)	10.41	Sebastián Keitel (CHI)	10.42
200 metres	Claudinei da Silva (BRA)	20.23	André da Silva (BRA)	20.56	Sebastián Keitel (CHI)	20.77
400 metres	Sanderlei Parrela (BRA)	44.80	Anderson Jorge dos Santos (BRA)	45.59	Gustavo Aguirre (ARG)	46.69
800 metres	Hudson de Souza (BRA)	1:47.18	Marcio Wandre de Oliveira (BRA)	1:48.53	Sergio Gallardo (ESP)	1:48.85
1500 metres	Hudson de Souza (BRA)	3:42.21	Manuel Damião (POR)	3:43.06	Javier Carriqueo (ARG)	3:44.93
5000 metres	José Ramos (POR)	13:43.86	Pablo Olmedo (MEX)	13:44.44	Elenílson da Silva (BRA)	13:48.74
10,000 metres	Elenilson da Silva (BRA)	28:57.98	Marílson dos Santos (BRA)	28:58.74	Isaac García (MEX)	28:59.68
110 metres hurdles	Márcio de Souza (BRA)	13.76	Redelen dos Santos (BRA)	13.91	Jackson Quiñónez (ECU)	14.66
400 metres hurdles	Eronilde de Araújo (BRA)	49.35	Carlos Zbinden (CHI)	50.32	Anderson Costa dos Santos (BRA)	50.59
3000 m steeplechase	José Luis Blanco (ESP)	8:28.44	Salvador Miranda (MEX)	8:28.80	José María González (ESP)	8:30.96
4×100 m relay	Brazil (BRA); Vicente de Lima; Édson Ribeiro; André da Silva; Claudinei da Silva	38.24 CR	Cuba (CUB); José Ángel César; Luis Alberto Pérez-Rionda; Iván García; Freddy Mayola	38.97	Chile (CHI); Juan Pablo Faúndez; Ricardo Roach; Sebastián Keitel; Rodrigo Roach	39.90
4×400 m relay	Brazil (BRA); Anderson Jorge dos Santos; Sanderlei Parrela; Luis Antônio Eloi; Valdinei da Silva	3:03.33	Chile (CHI); Ricardo Roach; Guillermo Meyer; Carlos Zbinden; Rodrigo Roach	3:10.86	Argentina (ARG); Carlos Gats; Gustavo Aguirre; Iván Altamirano; Gabriel López	3:12.45
20,000 m track walk	Noé Hernández (MEX)	1:24:50.46	João Vieira (POR)	1:26:37.78	Ricardo Alexandre Reinert (BRA)	1:32:43.63
High jump	Gilmar Mayo (COL)	2.24 m	Fabrício Romero (BRA)	2.24 m	David Antona (ESP)	2.22 m
Pole vault	Nuno Fernandes (POR)	5.20 m	Robison Pratt (MEX)	5.20 m	Edgar Díaz (PUR)	5.10 m
Long jump	Nelson Ferreira (BRA)	7.90 m	Esteban Copland (VEN)	7.81 m	Joan Lino Martínez (CUB)	7.71 m
Triple jump	Michael Calvo (CUB)	17.05 m CR	Rodrigo Mendes (BRA)	16.76 m	Antônio da Costa (BRA)	15.78 m
Shot put	Manuel Martínez Gutiérrez (ESP)	19.70 m	Yojer Medina (VEN)	18.89 m	Iker Sukia (ESP)	18.17 m
Discus throw	Frank Casañas (CUB)	59.87 m	Marcelo Pugliese (ARG)	58.14 m	Mario Pestano (ESP)	57.17 m
Hammer throw	Juan Ignacio Cerra (ARG)	74.32 m	Vítor Costa (POR)	72.36 m	José Manuel Pérez (ESP)	70.67 m
Javelin throw	Emeterio González (CUB)	80.02 m CR	Nery Kennedy (PAR)	75.60 m	Diego Moraga (CHI)	72.46 m
Decathlon	Édson Bindilatti (BRA)	7538 pts	Edemar dos Santos (BRA)	7406 pts	Enrique Aguirre (ARG)	6943 pts

=== Women ===
Event	Gold		Silver		Bronze	
100 metres	Liliana Allen (MEX)	11.57	Rosemar Coelho (BRA)	11.67	Mirtha Brock (COL)	11.70
200 metres	Felipa Palacios (COL)	23.18	Liliana Allen (MEX)	23.66	Julia Alba (ESP)	23.93
400 metres	Norma González (COL)	53.00	Lorena de Oliveira (BRA)	53.18	Luciana Mendes (BRA)	53.18
800 metres	Luciana Mendes (BRA)	2:01.77	Mayte Martínez (ESP)	2:04.02	Sandra Moya (PUR)	2:05.61
1500 metres	Nuria Fernández (ESP)	4:18.03	Rocío Rodríguez (ESP)	4:19.78	Niusha Mancilla (BOL)	4:20.02
5000 metres	Fernanda Ribeiro (POR)	15:29.47 CR	María Abel (ESP)	15:40.18	América Mateos (MEX)	15:42.19
10,000 metres	Érika Olivera (CHI)	33:39.16	Isabel Juárez (MEX)	34:37.03	Maria Rodrigues (BRA)	34:45.99
100 metres hurdles	Yahumara Neyra (CUB)	13.17	Maíla Machado (BRA)	13.25	Isabel Abrantes (POR)	13.30
400 metres hurdles	Ana Paula Pereira (BRA)	57.59	Jupira da Graça (BRA)	58.48	Mayte Urcelay (ESP)	58.90
3000 metres steeplechase	Soraya Telles-Teixeira (BRA)	10:49.52 CR	Alcina dos Reis (BRA)	10:52.81	Verónica Páez (ARG)	11:34.67
4×100 metres relay	Colombia (COL); Mirtha Brock; Felipa Palacios; Norma González; Princesa Oliveros	44.81	Brazil (BRA); Lucimar de Moura; Claudete Alves Pina; Kátia de Jesus Santos; Cleide Amaral	45.16	Puerto Rico (PUR); Jennifer Caraballo; Heysha Ortiz; Yesenia Rivera; Damaris Diana	45.26
4×400 metres relay	Colombia (COL); Mirtha Brock; Felipa Palacios; Norma González; Janeth Lucumí	3:34.51	Puerto Rico (PUR); Sandra Moya; Yamelis Ortiz; Beatriz Cruz; Maritza Salas	3:34.95	Brazil (BRA); Ana Paula Pereira; Jupira da Graça; Maria Laura Almirao; Claudete Alves Pina	3:36.07
10,000 m track walk	Rosario Sánchez (MEX)	45:38.90 CR	Geovana Irusta (BOL)	45:59.95 AR	Teresa Linares (ESP)	46:36.86
High jump	Solange Witteveen (ARG)	1.87 m	Marta Mendía (ESP)	1.84 m	Luciane Dambacher (BRA)	1.81 m
Pole vault	Alejandra García (ARG)	4.30 m CR	Paula Fernández (ESP)	4.00 m	Elisabete Tavares (POR)	3.90 m
Long jump	Maurren Maggi (BRA)	6.70 m	Andrea Ávila (ARG)	6.41 m	Luciana dos Santos (BRA)	6.28 m
Triple jump	Carlota Castrejana (ESP)	13.61 m	Luciana dos Santos (BRA)	13.46 m	Mónica Falcioni (URU)	12.92 m
Shot put	Martina de la Puente (ESP)	17.44 m	Marianne Berndt (CHI)	15.07 m	Andréa Pereira (BRA)	14.86 m
Discus throw	Katiuscia de Jesus (BRA)	51.41 m	Neolanis Suárez (VEN)	49.49 m	Fanny García (VEN)	49.45 m
Hammer throw	Dolores Pedrares (ESP)	61.39 m CR	Karina Moya (ARG)	58.90 m	Vânia Silva (POR)	57.35 m
Javelin throw (New javelin model)	Xiomara Rivero (CUB)	60.43 m	Sueli dos Santos (BRA)	58.94 m	Mercedes Chilla (ESP)	55.99 m
Heptathlon	Mônica Marques (BRA)	5480 pts	Naide Gomes (STP)	5463 pts	Patrícia de Souza (BRA)	4930 pts

== Medal table ==
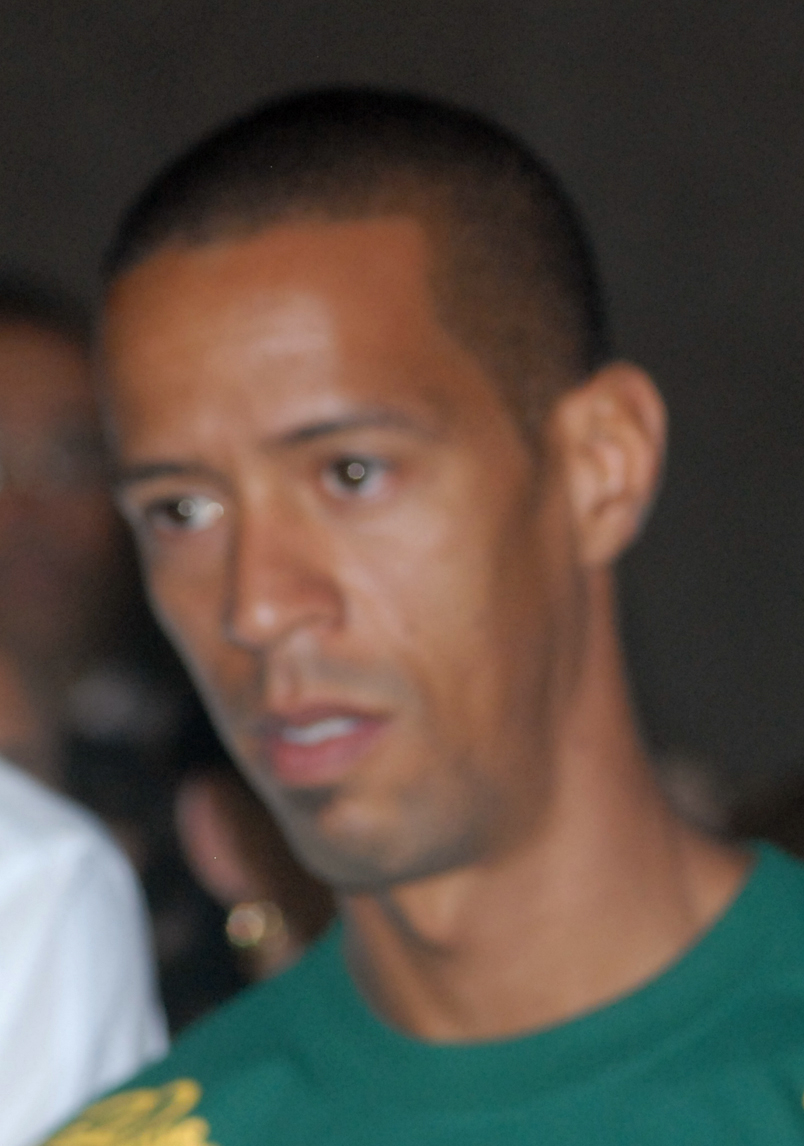
Brazil's Hudson de Souza won the 800 and 1500 m titles.

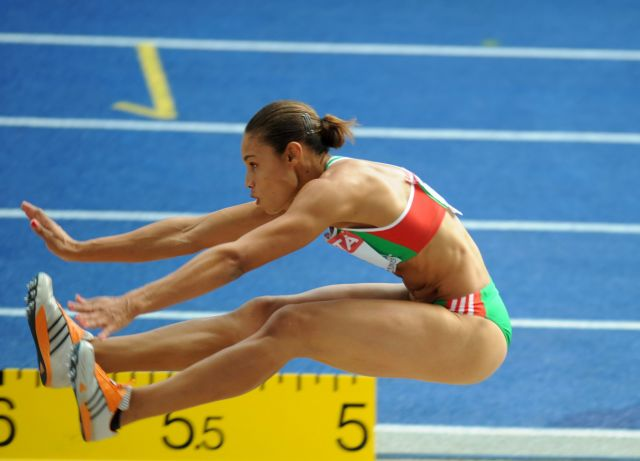
Heptathlon runner-up Naide Gomes was São Tomé and Príncipe's first ever medallist.

* Host nation (Brazil)

Rank	Nation	Gold	Silver	Bronze	Total
1	Brazil (BRA)*	18	16	11	45
2	Spain (ESP)	6	5	10	21
3	Cuba (CUB)	5	2	1	8
4	Colombia (COL)	5	0	1	6
5	Mexico (MEX)	3	5	2	10
6	Argentina (ARG)	3	3	5	11
7	Portugal (POR)	3	3	3	9
8	Chile (CHI)	1	3	5	9
9	Venezuela (VEN)	0	3	1	4
10	Puerto Rico (PUR)	0	1	3	4
11	Bolivia (BOL)	0	1	1	2
12	Paraguay (PAR)	0	1	0	1
12	São Tomé and Príncipe (STP)	0	1	0	1
14	Uruguay (URU)	0	0	1	1
Totals (14 entries)		44	44	44	132

== Participation ==
A total of 20 delegations were sent from the 28 member nations of the Asociación Iberoamericana de Atletismo, with 297 athletes being present at the competition. Recently joined members Angola, Cape Verde and Equatorial Guinea were all absent in 2000. Costa Rica, El Salvador and the Dominican Republic were other regular participants who did not take part in the championships.

- Argentina (26)
- Brazil (82)
- Bolivia (3)
- Chile (27)
- Colombia (13)
- Cuba (12)
- Ecuador (5)
- Guatemala (5)
- Guinea-Bissau (1)
- Mexico (20)
- Mozambique (4)
- Panama (2)
- Paraguay (5)
- Peru (6)
- Portugal (11)
- Puerto Rico (19)
- São Tomé and Príncipe (1)
- Spain (30)
- Uruguay (8)
- Venezuela (17)
