= Néstor García (runner) =

Uruguayan marathon runner

Personal information
- Born: July 6, 1975 (age 50)

Sport
- Sport: Track and field

Néstor Ariel García Rivero (born July 6, 1975) is a male marathon runner from Uruguay.

Garcia won the 2000 edition of the Buenos Aires Marathon in Argentina. He also represented his native country in the men's marathon at the 2000 Summer Olympics in Sydney, Australia.

García is the national record holder in the classic distance with 2:12:48, ran on October 24, 1999, at the Chicago Marathon.

== Achievements ==
Year	Competition	Venue	Position	Event	Notes
Representing Uruguay
1994	World Junior Championships	Lisbon, Portugal	22nd	10,000 m	31:00.53
1997	South American Championships	Mar del Plata, Argentina	7th	1500 m	4:00.77
1997	South American Championships	Mar del Plata, Argentina	2nd	5000 m	14:15.56
2000	Olympic Games	Sydney, Australia	48th	Marathon	2:22:30
2000	Buenos Aires Marathon	Buenos Aires, Argentina	1st	Marathon	2:20:14
