= Carlos Zbinden =

Chilean athlete (born 1976)

Personal information
- Born: 2 December 1976 (age 49)

Sport
- Sport: Track and field
Medal record
Representing Chile
South American Games
Gold medal – first place	1998 Cuenca	400m hurdles
Silver medal – second place	1998 Cuenca	4x400m relay

Carlos Luis Zbinden Brito (born 2 December 1976) is a retired Chilean athlete who specialised in the 400 metres and 400 metres hurdles. He represented his country at the 2000 Summer Olympics without advancing to the semifinals.

His personal best in the event is 49.72 seconds, set in Alcorcón in 1998, a former national record.

== Competition record ==
Year	Competition	Venue	Position	Event	Notes
Representing Chile
1992	South American Youth Championships	Santiago, Chile	6th	300 m hurdles	41.01
1993	South American Junior Championships	Puerto la Cruz, Venezuela	7th	400 m	50.76
1993	South American Junior Championships	Puerto la Cruz, Venezuela	7th	400 m hurdles	55.38
1993	South American Junior Championships	Puerto la Cruz, Venezuela	4th	4x400 m relay	3:19.24
1994	South American Junior Championships	Santa Fe, Argentina	1st	400 m hurdles	53.50
1994	South American Junior Championships	Santa Fe, Argentina	3rd	4x400 m relay	3:18.00
1995	Pan American Junior Championships	Santiago, Chile	5th	400 m hurdles	53.24
1995	Pan American Junior Championships	Santiago, Chile	5th	4x400 m relay	3:17.68
1995	South American Junior Championships	Santiago, Chile	3rd	400 m	48.88
1995	South American Junior Championships	Santiago, Chile	4th	400 m hurdles	53.59
1995	South American Junior Championships	Santiago, Chile	4th	4x400 m relay	3:16.99
1997	South American Championships	Mar del Plata, Argentina	2nd	400 m	47.33
1997	South American Championships	Mar del Plata, Argentina	3rd	400 m hurdles	50.11
1997	South American Championships	Mar del Plata, Argentina	2nd	4x400 m relay	3:07.98
1997	World Championships	Athens, Greece	36th (h)	400 m hurdles	50.42
1997	Universiade	Catania, Italy	28th (h)	400 m hurdles	51.75
1997	Universiade	Catania, Italy	15th (h)	4x100 m relay	41.43
1998	Ibero-American Championships	Lisbon, Portugal	10th (h)	400 m hurdles	50.80
1998	South American Games	Cuenca, Ecuador	1st	400 m hurdles	50.1
1998	South American Games	Cuenca, Ecuador	2nd	4x400 m relay	3:12.0
1999	South American Championships	Bogotá, Colombia	4th	400 m hurdles	51.06
1999	Pan American Games	Winnipeg, Canada	9th (h)	400 m hurdles	50.26
2000	Ibero-American Championships	Rio de Janeiro, Brazil	2nd	400 m hurdles	50.32
2000	Ibero-American Championships	Rio de Janeiro, Brazil	2nd	4x400 m relay	3:10.86
2000	Olympic Games	Sydney, Australia	45th (h)	400 m hurdles	51.36
2001	South American Championships	Manaus, Brazil	2nd	400 m hurdles	50.99
2001	South American Championships	Manaus, Brazil	4th	4x400 m relay	3:16.33
2003	South American Championships	Barquisimeto, Venezuela	5th	400 m hurdles	52.25
2003	South American Championships	Barquisimeto, Venezuela	6th	4x400 m relay	3:16.55
2004	Ibero-American Championships	Huelva, Spain	7th	400 m hurdles	52.14
