= Gustavo Aguirre =

Argentine sprinter (born 1977)

Gustavo Hernando Aguirre (born 8 April 1977 in Buenos Aires) is a retired Argentine athlete who specialised in the 400 metres. He competed at the 2000 Summer Olympics failing to qualify for the second round.

His 400 metres personal best of 46.18, set in 1999, is the standing national record. His 800 metres personal best is 1:47.23, set in 2007.

== Competition record ==
Year	Competition	Venue	Position	Event	Notes
Representing Argentina
1992	South American Youth Championships	Santiago, Chile	1st	400 m	49.99
1992	South American Youth Championships	Santiago, Chile	1st	800 m	1:57.27
1994	South American Junior Championships	Santa Fe, Argentina	4th	400 m	49.46
1994	South American Junior Championships	Santa Fe, Argentina	2nd	4 × 400 m relay	3:17.93
1994	Ibero-American Championships	Mar del Plata, Argentina	5th	4 × 400 m relay	3:10.51
1995	Pan American Games	Mar del Plata, Argentina	16th (h)	400 m	48.84
1995	Pan American Junior Championships	Santiago, Chile	8th (h)	400 m	49.23
1995	South American Junior Championships	Santiago, Chile	2nd	400 m	48.19
1995	South American Junior Championships	Santiago, Chile	3rd	4 × 400 m relay	3:16.63
1996	South American Junior Championships	Bucaramanga, Colombia	1st	400 m	48.3
1996	South American Junior Championships	Bucaramanga, Colombia	3rd	800 m	1:52.4
1996	South American Junior Championships	Bucaramanga, Colombia	3rd	4 × 100 m relay	41.4
1996	South American Junior Championships	Bucaramanga, Colombia	5th	4 × 400 m relay	3:20.5
1996	World Junior Championships	Sydney, Australia	34th (h)	400 m	48.46
1997	South American Championships	Mar del Plata, Argentina	3rd	400 m	47.52
1997	South American Championships	Mar del Plata, Argentina	4th	4x400 m relay	3:10.33
1998	Ibero-American Championships	Lisbon, Portugal	8th	800 m	1:53.52
1999	South American Championships	Bogotá, Colombia	4th	800 m	1:51.21
1999	South American Championships	Bogotá, Colombia	3rd	4 × 400 m relay	3:08.53
2000	Ibero-American Championships	Rio de Janeiro, Brazil	3rd	400 m	46.69
2000	Ibero-American Championships	Rio de Janeiro, Brazil	3rd	4 × 400 m relay	3:12.45
2000	Olympic Games	Sydney, Australia	58th (h)	400 m	47.03
2001	South American Championships	Manaus, Brazil	4th	400 m	46.93
2001	South American Championships	Manaus, Brazil	3rd	4 × 400 m relay	3:13.88
2005	South American Championships	Cali, Colombia	3rd	400 m	46.43
2005	South American Championships	Cali, Colombia	3rd	4 × 400 m relay	3:08.61
2006	South American Championships	Tunja, Colombia	5th	400 m	47.86
2006	South American Championships	Tunja, Colombia	3rd	4 × 100 m relay	40.47
2006	South American Championships	Tunja, Colombia	4th	4 × 400 m relay	3:12.34
2007	Pan American Games	Rio de Janeiro, Brazil	7th	800 m	1:47.23
2008	Ibero-American Championships	Iquique, Chile	11th (h)	800 m	1:53.51
