= Karina Moya =

Argentine hammer thrower

Personal information
- Born: September 28, 1973 (age 52)

Sport
- Sport: Track and field

Karina Moya (born September 28, 1973) is a retired hammer thrower from Argentina. She set her personal best throw (63.51 metres) on July 10, 2004 at a meet in Rosario, Santa Fe. Moya also competed in the discus throw and the shot put.

== Achievements ==
Year	Competition	Venue	Position	Notes
Representing Argentina
1994	Ibero-American Championships	Mar del Plata, Argentina	3rd	50.56 m
1995	Pan American Games	Mar del Plata, Argentina	6th	51.94 m
1995	South American Championships	Manaus, Brazil	2nd	52.18 m
1996	Ibero-American Championships	Medellín, Colombia	4th	50.56 m
1997	South American Championships	Mar del Plata, Argentina	2nd	54.30 m
1998	Ibero-American Championships	Lisbon, Portugal	4th	55.88 m
1999	South American Championships	Bogotá, Colombia	1st	60.69 m
1999	Pan American Games	Winnipeg, Canada	9th	51.91 m
2000	Ibero-American Championships	Rio de Janeiro, Brazil	2nd	58.90 m
2001	South American Championships	Manaus, Brazil	1st	60.83 m
2001	World Championships	Edmonton, Canada	32nd (q)	57.01 m
2002	Ibero-American Championships	Guatemala City, Guatemala	5th	56.19 m
2003	South American Championships	Barquisimeto, Venezuela	5th	57.40 m
2004	Ibero-American Championships	Huelva, Spain	9th	59.08 m
2005	South American Championships	Cali, Colombia	7th	59.39 m
2006	Ibero-American Championships	Ponce, Puerto Rico	5th	60.83 m
