= Nélson Carlos Ferreira =

Brazilian long jumper (born 1973)

Personal information
- Born: January 1, 1973 (age 53) Barbosa Ferraz, Paraná, Brazil

Sport
- Sport: Track and field
Medal record
Representing Brazil
South American Games
| Gold medal – first place | 1994 Valencia | Long jump |

Nélson Carlos Ferreira Júnior (born 1 January 1973) is a retired Brazilian athlete who specialised in the long jump. He represented his country at the 1996 and 2000 Summer Olympics. In addition, he competed in three consecutive World Championships starting in 1993, his best result being the fifth place at the 1997 edition.

== Competition record ==
| Year | Competition | Venue | Position | Event | Notes |
Representing Brazil
| 1990 | South American Junior Championships | Bogotá, Colombia | 1st | Long jump | 7.18 m |
| 1991 | South American Junior Championships | Asunción, Paraguay | 2nd | Long jump | 6.91 m |
| 1992 | South American Junior Championships | Lima, Peru | 2nd | Long jump | 7.33 m |
| 1992 | World Junior Championships | Seoul, South Korea | – | 4 × 100 m relay | DNF |
| 1992 | World Junior Championships | Seoul, South Korea | 9th | Long jump | 7.41 m |
| 1993 | World Championships | Stuttgart, Germany | 38th (q) | Long jump | 7.31 m |
| 1994 | South American Games | Valencia, Venezuela | 1st | Long jump | 7.84 m |
| 1995 | South American Championships | Manaus, Brazil | 2nd | Long jump | 8.05 m |
| 1995 | World Championships | Gothenburg, Sweden | 17th (q) | Long jump | 7.87 m |
| 1996 | Ibero-American Championships | Medellín, Colombia | 1st | Long jump | 8.41 m (w) |
| 1996 | Olympic Games | Atlanta, United States | 27th (q) | Long jump | 7.76 m |
| 1997 | World Indoor Championships | Paris, France | 21st (q) | Long jump | 7.58 m |
| 1997 | South American Championships | Mar del Plata, Argentina | 1st | 4 × 100 m relay | 40.07 s |
| 1997 | South American Championships | Mar del Plata, Argentina | 1st | Long jump | 7.84 m |
| 1997 | World Championships | Athens, Greece | 5th | Long jump | 8.04 m |
| 1997 | Universiade | Catania, Italy | 21st (q) | Long jump | 7.58 m |
| 1999 | Universiade | Palma de Mallorca, Spain | 5th | Long jump | 7.83 m |
| 1999 | Pan American Games | Winnipeg, Canada | 5th | Long jump | 7.77 m |
| 1999 | World Championships | Seville, Spain | 28th (q) | Long jump | 7.71 m |
| 2000 | Ibero-American Championships | Rio de Janeiro, Brazil | 1st | Long jump | 7.90 m |
| 2000 | Olympic Games | Sydney, Australia | 43rd (q) | Long jump | 7.32 m |
| 2001 | South American Championships | Manaus, Brazil | 1st | Long jump | 7.67 m |

== Personal bests ==
Outdoor

- 100 metres – 10.64 (+1.6 m/s) (Americana 2001)
- Long jump – 8.36 (+0.8 m/s) (Medellín 1996)
- Triple jump – 15.17 (1994)

Indoor

- Long jump – 7.58 (Paris 1997)
