= Marta Godinho =

Portuguese long jumper

Marta Godinho (born 24 June 1980) is a Portuguese long jumper.

She finished tenth at the 2001 IAAF World Indoor Championships in Lisbon.
