= Rodrigo Roach =

Chilean sprinter

Personal information
- Nationality: Chilean
- Born: 12 October 1972 (age 54) Santiago, Chile

Sport
- Sport: Sprinting
- Event: 4 × 100 metres relay

Rodrigo Roach González (born 12 October 1972) is a Chilean sprinter. He competed in the men's 4 × 100 metres relay at the 2000 Summer Olympics. His twin brother, Ricardo, competed in the same event.
