= 1994 South American Junior Championships in Athletics =

XXVI South American Junior Championships in Athletics
- Dates: September 1–4
- Host city: Santa Fe, Argentina
- Level: Junior
- Events: 42
- Participation: about 259 athletes from 12 nations

The 26th South American Junior Championships in Athletics were held in Santa Fe, Argentina from September 1–4, 1994.

== Participation (unofficial) ==
Detailed result lists can be found on the "World Junior Athletics History" website. An unofficial count yields the number of about 259 athletes from about 12 countries: Argentina (50), Bolivia (7), Brazil (61), Chile (41), Colombia (15), Ecuador (17), Guyana (2), Panama (2), Paraguay (19), Peru (11), Uruguay (31), Venezuela (3).

== Medal summary ==
Medal winners are published for men and women Complete results can be found on the "World Junior Athletics History" website.

=== Men ===
Event	Gold		Silver		Bronze	
100 metres	Emerson Perín (BRA)	10.89	Jimmy Pino (COL)	11.04	Javier Rodríguez (ARG)	11.18
200 metres	Inácio Leão Filho (BRA)	21.69	Daniel Sarmiento (URU)	21.87	Víctor Hugo Goulart (BRA)	22.23
400 metres	Víctor Hugo Goulart (BRA)	48.18	Mario Reis (BRA)	48.67	Jonathan Gómez (COL)	49.25
800 metres	Alcides Pinto (COL)	1:51.73	Antônio Horbach (BRA)	1:51.74	Márcio da Silva (BRA)	1:52.61
1500 metres	Antônio Horbach (BRA)	3:53.3	Emigdio Delgado (VEN)	3:53.8	Márcio da Silva (BRA)	3:54.2
5000 metres	André Espírito Santo (BRA)	14:39.6	Gustavo de Paula (BRA)	14:43.0	Iván Noms (ARG)	14:46.2
10,000 metres	Clodoaldo dos Santos (BRA)	31:59.9	Marcelo Silva (BRA)	32:00.3	Iván Noms (ARG)	32:03.9
110 metres hurdles	Emerson Perín (BRA)	14.26	Carlos Vega (CHI)	15.14	José David Riesco (PER)	15.24
400 metres hurdles	Carlos Zbinden (CHI)	53.50	Alexander Mena (COL)	53.63	Felipe Figueirêdo (BRA)	54.93
3000 metres steeplechase	Gustavo de Paula (BRA)	9:03.81	Robinson Alves (BRA)	9:20.84	Julián Peralta (ARG)	9:23.15
4 × 100 metres relay	Brazil; Inácio Leão; Emerson Perin; Víctor Goulart; Kleber da Silva	41.44	Uruguay; Luis Botto; Christian Stahl; Luis Junarena; Daniel Sarmiento	42.41	Chile; Rodrigo Sandoval; Andrés Lavin; Mauricio Rojas; Carlos Vega	42.54
4 × 400 metres relay	Brazil; Mario Reis; Kleber da Silva; António Horbach; Víctor Goulart	3:14.82	Argentina; Gabriel Guzmán; Mauricio Fernández; Gustavo Aguirre; Néstor Barrios	3:17.93	Chile; Mario Gómez; Luis Puebla; Carlos Zbinden; Andrés Lavin	3:18.00
10,000 metres track walk	Milton Uyaguari (ECU)	43:28.4	Omar Aguirre (ECU)	43:28.4	Nixon Zambrano (COL)	43:35.1
High jump	Paulo Ruimar (BRA)	2.04	Fabrício Romero (BRA)	2.01	Erasmo Jara (ARG)	1.98
Pole vault	Leonidas Aguiar (BRA)	4.20	Marcos Senisky (BRA)	4.10	Cristián Larraín (CHI)	4.00
Long jump	Jeremy Racey (CHI)	7.10	Leonardo Geremias (BRA)	7.02	Leandro Simes (ARG)	6.86
Triple jump	Sérgio dos Santos (BRA)	15.50w	Márcio Cardoso (BRA)	15.14	Juan Carlos Chávez (ARG)	14.83w
Shot put	Mauro Ordiales (ARG)	15.28	Francisco Pinter (ARG)	14.05	Marco Antonio Verni (CHI)	13.82
Discus throw	Julio Piñero (ARG)	56.26	Mauro Ordiales (ARG)	48.30	Carlos Soarez (BRA)	43.46
Hammer throw	Juan Cerra (ARG)	66.62	Aldo Bello (VEN)	55.62	Mauro Ordiales (ARG)	54.24
Javelin throw	Marcos Vieira (BRA)	60.90	Diego Moraga (CHI)	58.40	Julio Piñero (ARG)	57.30
Decathlon	Márcio de Souza (BRA)	6530	Jeremy Racey (CHI)	6444	Alejandro Acosta (ARG)	6316

=== Women ===
Event	Gold		Silver		Bronze	
100 metres	Felipa Palacios (COL)	11.84	María Laura Rodríguez (ARG)	12.06	Irene Boldrim (BRA)	12.32
200 metres	Felipa Palacios (COL)	24.19	Daniella Janzen (BRA)	24.91	María Laura Rodríguez (ARG)	25.03
400 metres	Maricel Palmieri (ARG)	55.86	Kelly de Oliveira (BRA)	56.02	Liset Valois (COL)	57.58
800 metres	Clara Morales (CHI)	2:11.38	Fabiane dos Santos (BRA)	2:11.66	Natalia Rivarola (ARG)	2:14.30
1500 metres	Clara Morales (CHI)	4:31.4	Bertha Sánchez (COL)	4:32.0	Karina Moncayo (ECU)	4:41.4
3000 metres	Bertha Sánchez (COL)	9:41.36	Fabiana Cristine da Silva (BRA)	9:44.90	Erika Olivera (CHI)	9:48.03
10,000 metres	Erika Olivera (CHI)	34:14.4	Helena dos Santos (BRA)	35:46.3	María Elena Calle (ECU)	36:28.7
100 metres hurdles	Maurren Maggi (BRA)	14.13	Claudia Casals (ARG)	14.26	Mariela Andrade (ARG)	14.57
400 metres hurdles	Kelly de Oliveira (BRA)	60.69	Maricel Palmieri (ARG)	60.84	Ondina Rodríguez (ECU)	62.59
4 × 100 metres relay	Brazil; Kátia da Silva; Irene Boldrim; Kelly de Oliveira; Daniele Janzen	47.00	Colombia; Elena Guerrero; Felipa Palacios; Liset Valois; Denise Caicedo	47.13	Uruguay; Patricia Banchero; Karina Soto; Alejandra Monza; Rocío Cabrera	47.46
4 × 400 metres relay	Brazil; Anice Schoulten; Renata Brito; Fabiane dos Santos; Kelly de Oliveira	3:48.49	Chile; Catherine Aravena; Carola Alvarado; Clara Morales; Hannelore Grosser	3:52.19	Argentina; Raquel Maraviglia; Fernanda De Bastos; Natalia Rivarola; Maricel Palmieri	3:52.28
5000 metres track walk	Nohora Paque (COL)	23:32.7	Geovana Irusta (BOL)	23:38.6	Gladys Criollo (ECU)	24:25.3
High jump	Luciane Dambacher (BRA)	1.78	Solange Witteveen (ARG)	1.76	Mariela Andrade (ARG)	1.72
Long jump	Helena Guerrero (COL)	5.60	Mónica Castro (CHI)	5.50	María Abasolo (CHI)	5.33
Triple jump	Adriana Matoso (BRA)	12.40	Lilia Aguirre (ARG)	11.86	Alicia Medina (ARG)	11.79
Shot put	Josiane Soares (BRA)	13.63	Margit Wahlbrink (BRA)	13.55	Clara Palacios (COL)	12.68
Discus throw	Fanny García (VEN)	44.48	María Eugenia Giggi (ARG)	43.42	Erika Pinto (BRA)	41.58
Hammer throw	Vanesa Valarella (ARG)	47.00	Erika Melián (ARG)	42.98	Sandra Guzmán (URU)	35.78
Javelin throw	Alessandra Resende (BRA)	52.52	Claudineia Barreto (BRA)	49.72	Sabina Moya (COL)	45.48
Heptathlon	Mariela Andrade (ARG)	4215	Claudia Casals (ARG)	4545	Sonia Estacio (COL)	3967

== Medal table (unofficial) ==
* Host nation (Argentina)

Rank	Nation	Gold	Silver	Bronze	Total
1	Brazil	23	16	7	46
2	Argentina*	6	11	16	33
3	Colombia	6	4	6	16
4	Chile	5	5	6	16
5	Venezuela	1	2	0	3
6	Ecuador	1	1	4	6
7	Uruguay	0	2	2	4
8	Bolivia	0	1	0	1
9	Peru	0	0	1	1
Totals (9 entries)		42	42	42	126
