= Elena Guerra (athlete) =

Uruguayan middle-distance runner

Personal information
- Nationality: Uruguayan
- Born: 20 January 1976 (age 50)

Sport
- Sport: Middle-distance running
- Event: 1500 metres

Elena Guerra (born 20 January 1976) is a Uruguayan middle-distance runner. She competed in the women's 1500 metres at the 2004 Summer Olympics.
