= 1997 South American Championships in Athletics =

- Dates: 4–6 April
- Host city: Mar del Plata, Argentina
- Venue: Estadio Municipal Teodoro Bronzini
- Events: 43
- Participation: 225 athletes from 10 nations

The 1997 South American Championships in Athletics were held in Mar del Plata, Argentina between 4 and 6 April.

== Medal summary ==
=== Men's events ===
Event	Gold		Silver		Bronze	
100 metres (wind: +2.0 m/s)	Sebastián Keitel; Chile	10.30	André da Silva; Brazil	10.32	Carlos Gats; Argentina	10.46
200 metres (wind: -4.2 m/s)	Claudinei da Silva; Brazil	21.06	Sebastián Keitel; Chile	21.13	Sidney Telles de Souza; Brazil	21.32
400 metres	Sanderlei Parrela; Brazil	46.17	Carlos Zbinden; Chile	47.33	Gustavo Aguirre; Argentina	47.52
800 metres	Valdinei da Silva; Brazil	1:46.89	Flavio Godoy; Brazil	1:48.50	Manuel Balmaceda; Chile	1:51.58
1500 metres	Edgar de Oliveira; Brazil	3:47.76	José Valente; Brazil	3:50.64	Pablo Ramírez; Ecuador	3:51.85
5000 metres	Eduardo Carrasco; Chile	14:08.48	Néstor García; Uruguay	14:15.56	Pedro Rojas; Colombia	14:17.48
10,000 metres	Eduardo Carrasco; Chile	29:07.77	Emerson Iser Bem; Brazil	29:10.67	Pedro Rojas; Colombia	29:11.74
3000 metres steeplechase	Wander Moura; Brazil	8:35.40 CR	Pablo Ramírez; Ecuador	8:48.50 NR	Julián Peralta; Argentina	8:54.64
110 metres hurdles (wind: +3.8 m/s)	Emerson Perín; Brazil	14.21w	José Humberto Rivas; Colombia	14.29w	Oscar Ratto; Argentina	14.64w
400 metres hurdles	Eronilde de Araújo; Brazil	49.35	Cleverson da Silva; Brazil	49.85	Carlos Zbinden; Chile	50.11
4 × 100 metres relay	Brazil; Nelson Ferreira; Emerson Perin; Claudinei da Silva; Sidnei de Souza	40.07	Chile; Pablo Almeida; Ricardo Roach; Sebastián Keitel; Carlos Moreno	40.08	Argentina; Jorge Polanco; Gabriel Simon; Guillermo Cacián; Carlos Gats	40.11
4 × 400 metres relay	Brazil; Eronilde de Araújo; Sanderlei Parrela; Inaldo Sena; Valdinei da Silva	3:04.20 CR	Chile; Carlos Moreno; Ricardo Roach; Alejandro Krauss; Carlos Zbinden	3:07.98	Colombia; Wenceslao Ferrín; Llimy Rivas; Fernando Robledo; Julio César Rojas	3:09.10
20,000 metres track walk	Héctor Moreno; Colombia	1:23:06.73 CR	Sérgio Galdino; Brazil	1:23:28.06	Cláudio Bertolino; Brazil	1:28:02.74
High jump	Gilmar Mayo; Colombia	2.26 CR	Fabrício Romero; Brazil	2.15	Wagner Príncipe; Brazil	2.15
Pole vault	Oscar Veit; Argentina	4.85	Fernando Pastoriza; Argentina	4.80	Sebastián Ortiz; Uruguay	4.70
Long jump	Nelson Ferreira; Brazil	7.84	Márcio da Cruz; Brazil	7.59	Yesid Cossio; Colombia	7.32
Triple jump	Anísio Silva; Brazil	16.24	Márcio Cardoso; Brazil	15.89	Alejandro Gats; Argentina	14.99
Shot put	Édson Miguel; Brazil	17.44	Marco Antonio Verni; Chile	16.82	Andrés Solo de Zaldívar; Chile	15.74
Discus throw	Ramón Jiménez Gaona; Paraguay	57.32	Marcelo Pugliese; Argentina	54.18	Julio Piñero; Argentina	53.00
Hammer throw	Juan Cerra; Argentina	68.92	Adrián Marzo; Argentina	66.36	Eduardo Acuña; Peru	59.72
Javelin throw	Nery Kennedy; Paraguay	75.08	Luiz Fernando da Silva; Brazil	74.88	Luis Lucumí; Colombia	74.00
Decathlon	Alejandro Acosta; Argentina	6546	Santiago Lorenzo; Argentina	6495	Alexis Recioy; Uruguay	6433
WR world record | AR area record | CR championship record | GR games record | NR national record | OR Olympic record | PB personal best | SB season best | WL world leading (in a given season)

=== Women's events ===
Event	Gold		Silver		Bronze	
100 metres (wind: +4.5 m/s)	Lucimar de Moura; Brazil	11.47w	Felipa Palacios; Colombia	11.48w	Zandra Borrero; Colombia	11.75w
200 metres (wind: -0.8 m/s)	Felipa Palacios; Colombia	23.20 CR	Lucimar de Moura; Brazil	23.51	Olga Conte; Argentina	23.90
400 metres	Olga Conte; Argentina	53.41	Maria Figueirêdo; Brazil	53.49	Norfalia Carabalí; Colombia	54.47
800 metres	Luciana Mendes; Brazil	2:03.56	Mercy Colorado; Ecuador	2:06.90 NR	Fátima dos Santos; Brazil	2:09.08
1500 metres	Janeth Caizalitín; Ecuador	4:33.65	Niusha Mancilla; Bolivia	4:34.90	Célia dos Santos; Brazil	4:35.29
5000 metres	Stella Castro; Colombia	15:48.82 CR NR	Érika Olivera; Chile	15:52.27	Elisa Cobañea; Argentina	16:05.51
10,000 metres	Stella Castro; Colombia	33:24.07 CR	Érika Olivera; Chile	33:56.98	Mónica Cervera; Argentina	36:39.25
100 metres hurdles (wind: +8.0 m/s)	Verónica Depaoli; Argentina	13.41w	Maurren Maggi; Brazil	13.65w	Vânia da Silva; Brazil	13.95w
400 metres hurdles	Verónica Depaoli; Argentina	59.05	Maria dos Santos; Brazil	59.62	Marise da Silva; Brazil	60.00
4 × 100 metres relay	Colombia; Mirtha Brock; Norfalia Carabalí; Felipa Palacios; Sandra Borrero	44.58 CR	Brazil; Maria Magnólia Figueiredo; Lucimar de Moura; Claudete Alves Pina; Kátia Regina Santos	45.21	Argentina; Daniela Lebreo; Veronica Depaoli; Vanesa Wohlgemuth; Olga Conte	46.18
4 × 400 metres relay	Colombia; Mirtha Brock; Norfalia Carabalí; Felipa Palacios; Janeth Lucumi	3:36.71	Brazil; Maria Magnólia Figueiredo; Luciana Mendes; Claudete Alves Pina; Fatima dos Santos	3:38.18	Argentina; Daniela Lebreo; Marina Arias; Veronica Depaoli; Olga Conte	3:40.72
10,000 metres track walk	Geovana Irusta; Bolivia	46:01.1 CR	Miriam Ramón; Ecuador	46:50.6	Bertha Vera; Ecuador	47:15.9
High jump	Solange Witteveen; Argentina	1.89 =CR	Delfina Blaquier; Argentina; Orlane dos Santos; Brazil	1.83		
Pole vault	Déborah Gyurcsek; Uruguay	3.85 CR	Alejandra García; Argentina	3.50	Mariela Laurora; Argentina	3.45
Long jump	Maurren Maggi; Brazil	6.54	Andrea Ávila; Argentina	6.26w	Mónica Falcioni; Uruguay	6.25w
Triple jump	Andrea Ávila; Argentina	13.76	Maria de Souza; Brazil	13.72	Luciana dos Santos; Brazil	13.30
Shot put	Elisângela Adriano; Brazil	18.16 CR	Alexandra Amaro; Brazil	16.34	Silvana Filippi; Argentina	13.81
Discus throw	Elisângela Adriano; Brazil	58.46 CR	Liliana Martinelli; Argentina	52.26	María Eugenia Giggi; Argentina	45.80
Hammer throw	María Eugenia Villamizar; Colombia	55.48	Karina Moya; Argentina	54.30	Zulma Lambert; Argentina	50.64
Javelin throw	Zuleima Araméndiz; Colombia	56.66	Sabina Moya; Colombia	55.30	Mariela Arch; Argentina	54.08
Heptathlon	Euzinete dos Reis; Brazil	5549	Zorobabelia Córdoba; Colombia	5428	Joelma Souza; Brazil	4380
WR world record | AR area record | CR championship record | GR games record | NR national record | OR Olympic record | PB personal best | SB season best | WL world leading (in a given season)

== Medal table ==
Rank	Nation	Gold	Silver	Bronze	Total
1	Brazil	18	19	9	46
2	Colombia	9	4	7	20
3	Argentina	8	9	17	34
4	Chile	3	7	3	13
5	Paraguay	2	0	0	2
6	Ecuador	1	3	2	6
7	Uruguay	1	1	3	5
8	Bolivia	1	1	0	2
9	Peru	0	0	1	1
Totals (9 entries)		43	44	42	129

== Participating nations ==
- Argentina (63)
- Bolivia (3)
- Brazil (58)
- Chile (18)
- Colombia (25)
- Ecuador (10)
- Panama (2)
- Paraguay (5)
- Peru (16)
- Uruguay (25)
