= List of Argentine Athletics Championships winners =

The Argentine Athletics Championships is an annual outdoor competition in the sport of athletics that is organised by the Argentine Athletics Confederation which serves as the national championship for Argentina. It was first held in 1920 as a men only event and women's events were added from 1939 onwards. Most of the winners have been Argentine nationals, though a small number of invited foreign athletes have won events at the competition.

In the period 1956 to 1960 two national championships were held, one by the Argentine Athletics Confederation and the other by the Argentine Athletics Federation. These are distinguished as "C" and "F" in the below lists.

== Men's track ==
=== 100 metres ===
- 1960F: Luis Vienna
- 1960C: Jorge Caffa
- 1961: Pedro Blache
- 1962: Luis Vienna
- 1963: Germán Oliva
- 1964: Diego Soler
- 1965: Juan Carlos García
- 1966: Roberto Schaefer
- 1967: Roberto Schaefer
- 1968: Andrés Calonge
- 1969: Rubén Paulo
- 1970: Pedro Bassart
- 1971: Pedro Bassart
- 1972: Pedro Bassart
- 1973: Gustavo Dubarbier
- 1974: Pedro Bassart
- 1975: Gustavo Dubarbier
- 1976: Carlos Martínez
- 1977: Gustavo Dubarbier
- 1978: Gustavo Dubarbier
- 1979: Gustavo Dubarbier
- 1980: Gustavo Dubarbier
- 1981: Nicolás Duncan Glass
- 1982: Hugo Alzamora
- 1983: Oscar Barrionuevo
- 1984: Oscar Barrionuevo
- 1985: Oscar Barrionuevo
- 1986: Gerardo Meinardi
- 1987: Gabriel Somma
- 1988: Claudio Arcas
- 1989: Alexandros Terzian
- 1990: Alexandros Terzian
- 1991: Claudio Molocznik
- 1992: Guillermo Cacián
- 1993: Carlos Gats
- 1994: Carlos Gats
- 1995: Gabriel Simón
- 1996: Carlos Gats
- 1997: Carlos Gats
- 1998: Gabriel Simón
- 1999: Gabriel Simón
- 2000: Gabriel Simón
- 2001: Gabriel Simón
- 2002: Gabriel Simón
- 2003: Matías Usandivaras
- 2004: Matías Usandivaras
- 2005: Iván Altamirano
- 2006: Iván Altamirano

=== 200 metres ===
- 1960F: Gerardo Bönnhoff
- 1960C: Jorge Caffa
- 1961: Raúl Zabala
- 1962: Luis Vienna
- 1963: Andrés Calonge
- 1964: Guillermo Vallanía
- 1965: Andrés Calonge
- 1966: Roberto Schaefer
- 1967: Eduardo Satoyama
- 1968: Andrés Calonge
- 1969: Rubén Paulo
- 1970: Andrés Calonge
- 1971: Pedro Bassart
- 1972: José Pérez Ferrería
- 1973: Carlos Bertotti
- 1974: Alfredo Milano
- 1975: Gustavo Dubarbier
- 1976: Gustavo Dubarbier
- 1977: Gustavo Dubarbier
- 1978: Carlos Gambetta
- 1979: Carlos Gambetta
- 1980: Eduardo Oscar de Brito
- 1981: Nicolás Duncan Glass
- 1982: Ernesto Braun
- 1983: Alfredo Muro
- 1984: Oscar Barrionuevo
- 1985: Oscar Barrionuevo
- 1986: Gerardo Meinardi
- 1987: Gabriel Somma
- 1988: Claudio Arcas
- 1989: Carlos Gats
- 1990: Alexandros Terzian
- 1991: José María Beduino
- 1992: Carlos Gats
- 1993: Carlos Gats
- 1994: Carlos Gats
- 1995: Guillermo Cacián
- 1996: Guillermo Cacián
- 1997: Carlos Gats
- 1998: Damián Spector
- 1999: Matías Fayos
- 2000: Nicolás Arias Duval
- 2001: Matías Fayos
- 2002: Matías Usandivaras
- 2003: Matías Usandivaras
- 2004: Matías Usandivaras
- 2005: Iván Altamirano
- 2006: Iván Altamirano

=== 400 metres ===
- 1960F: Juan Carlos Dyrzka
- 1960C: Ricardo Turesso
- 1961: Raúl Zabala
- 1962: Juan Carlos Dyrzka
- 1963: Víctor Lozano
- 1964: Carlos Heuchert
- 1965: Andrés Calonge
- 1966: Alfredo Sánchez
- 1967: Juan Carlos Dyrzka
- 1968: Alfredo Sánchez
- 1969: Luis Amatti
- 1970: Andrés Calonge
- 1971: Carlos Heuchert
- 1972: Carlos Inchasti
- 1973: Carlos Bertotti
- 1974: Rubén Buscalia
- 1975: Raúl Ham
- 1976: Carlos Bertotti
- 1977: Juan Rodríguez
- 1978: Angel Gagliano
- 1979: Angel Gagliano
- 1980: Angel Gagliano
- 1981: Angel Gagliano
- 1982: Daniel Bambicha
- 1983: Daniel Bambicha
- 1984: José María Beduino
- 1985: Dardo Angerami
- 1986: José María Beduino
- 1987: Daniel Bambicha
- 1988: José María Beduino
- 1989: Nicolás Rodríguez
- 1990: Claudio Arcas
- 1991: Claudio Arcas
- 1992: Claudio Arcas
- 1993: Cristian Díaz
- 1994: Guillermo Cacián
- 1995: Guillermo Cacián
- 1996: Gustavo Aguirre
- 1997: Gustavo Aguirre
- 1998: Gustavo Aguirre
- 1999: Gustavo Aguirre
- 2000: Gustavo Aguirre
- 2001: Gustavo Aguirre
- 2002: Gustavo Aguirre
- 2003: Gustavo Aguirre
- 2004: Esteban Brandán
- 2005: Esteban Brandán
- 2006: Esteban Brandán

=== 800 metres ===
- 1960F: Víctor Lozano
- 1960C: Norberto Perrone
- 1961: Víctor Lozano
- 1962: Víctor Lozano
- 1963: Víctor Lozano
- 1964: Guillermo Cuello
- 1965: Ricardo Antelo
- 1966: Guillermo Cuello
- 1967: Guillermo Cuello
- 1968: Mario Fabris
- 1969: Leandro Espínola
- 1970: Leandro Espínola
- 1971: Carlos Dalurzo
- 1972: Carlos Dalurzo
- 1973: Carlos Dalurzo
- 1974: Carlos Inchasti
- 1975: Carlos Villar
- 1976: Omar Amdematten
- 1977: Leandro Espínola
- 1978: Omar Amdematten
- 1979: Pedro Cáceres
- 1980: Raúl López
- 1981: Raúl López
- 1982: Raúl López
- 1983: Raúl López
- 1984: Luis Migueles
- 1985: Luis Migueles
- 1986: Luis Migueles
- 1987: Luis Migueles
- 1988: Luis Migueles
- 1989: Luis Migueles
- 1990: Leonardo Malgor
- 1991: Edgardo Graglia
- 1992: Luis Migueles
- 1993: Luis Migueles
- 1994: Gabriel López
- 1995: Víctor Matarresse
- 1996: Gabriel Guzmán
- 1997: Gabriel Guzmán
- 1998: Gabriel López
- 1999: Gustavo Aguirre
- 2000: Gustavo Aguirre
- 2001: Sebastián González Cabot
- 2002: Sebastián González Cabot
- 2003: Sebastián González Cabot
- 2004: Sebastián González Cabot
- 2005: Leonardo Price
- 2006: Matias Di Leva

=== 1500 metres ===
- 1960F: Juan Carlos Ferriolo
- 1960C: Ángel Miranda
- 1961: Rodolfo Antelo
- 1962: Eduardo Balducci
- 1963: Domingo Amaizón
- 1964: Juan Carlos Ferriolo
- 1965: Domingo Amaizón
- 1966: Juan Carlos Ferriolo
- 1967: Ricardo Leguiza
- 1968: Domingo Amaizón
- 1969: Nazario Araújo
- 1970: Abel Córdoba
- 1971: Abel Córdoba
- 1972: Abel Córdoba
- 1973: Omar Amdematten
- 1974: Leandro Espínola
- 1975: Carlos Villar
- 1976: Carlos Villar
- 1977: Leandro Espinola
- 1978: Omar Amdematten
- 1979: Omar Amdematten
- 1980: Alexis Abot
- 1981: Pedro Cáceres
- 1982: Omar Amdematten
- 1983: Marcos González
- 1984: Luis Migueles
- 1985: Luis Migueles
- 1986: Marcelo Cascabelo
- 1987: Antonio Silio
- 1988: Marcelo Cascabelo
- 1989: Carlos Naput
- 1990: Leonardo Malgor
- 1991: Alejandro Torres
- 1992: Leonardo Malgor
- 1993: Leonardo Malgor
- 1994: Leonardo Malgor
- 1995: Gustavo Romero
- 1996: Gabriel Chandía
- 1997: Juan José Cruz
- 1998: Julián Peralta
- 1999: Gabriel López
- 2000: Javier Carriqueo
- 2001: Sebastián González Cabot
- 2002: Javier Carriqueo
- 2003: Sebastián González Cabot
- 2004: Sebastián González Cabot
- 2005: Javier Carriqueo
- 2006: Leonardo Price

=== 3000 metres ===
- 1960C: Dionisio Bustos
- 1961: Rafael Garrone

=== 5000 metres ===
- 1960F: Domingo Amaizón
- 1960C: Dionisio Bustos
- 1961: Mario Cutropia
- 1962: Osvaldo Suárez
- 1963: Osvaldo Suárez
- 1964: Mario Cutropia
- 1965: Mario Cutropia
- 1966: Domingo Amaizón
- 1967: Alberto Ríos
- 1968: Domingo Amaizón
- 1969: Carlos Loto
- 1970: Domingo Amaizón
- 1971: Domingo Amaizón
- 1972: Domingo Amaizón
- 1973: Domingo Amaizón
- 1974: Albino Saldivia
- 1975: Mario Fernández
- 1976: Juan Adolfo Carrizo
- 1977: Norberto Limonta
- 1978: Norberto Limonta
- 1979: Norberto Limonta
- 1980: Jorge Monín
- 1981: Fernando Marrón
- 1982: Carlos Castro
- 1983: Julio César Gómez
- 1984: Juan Pablo Juárez
- 1985: Juan Pablo Juárez
- 1986: Juan Pablo Juárez
- 1987: Antonio Silio
- 1988: Antonio Silio
- 1989: Antonio Silio
- 1990: Oscar Raimo
- 1991: Antonio Ibáñez
- 1992: Oscar Amaya
- 1993: Antonio Ibáñez
- 1994: Daniel Castro
- 1995: Oscar Amaya
- 1996: Gabriel Chandía
- 1997: Oscar Amaya
- 1998: Iván Noms
- 1999: Ramiro Paris
- 2000: Javier Carriqueo
- 2001: Julián Peralta
- 2002: Javier Carriqueo
- 2003: José Mansilla
- 2004: César Troncoso
- 2005: Cristian Alfonsín
- 2006: Javier Carriqueo

=== 10,000 metres ===
- 1960F: Domingo Amaizón
- 1960C: Dionisio Bustos
- 1961: José Díaz
- 1962: Osvaldo Suárez
- 1963: Osvaldo Suárez
- 1964: Mario Cutropia
- 1965: Mario Cutropia
- 1966: Nazario Araújo
- 1967: Ricardo Leguiza
- 1968: Domingo Amaizón
- 1969: Osvaldo Suárez
- 1970: Domingo Amaizón
- 1971: Juan Adolfo Carrizo
- 1972: Domingo Amaizón
- 1973: Domingo Amaizón
- 1974: Carlos Agüero
- 1975: Albino Saldivia
- 1976: Juan Adolfo Carrizo
- 1977: Luis Esterio
- 1978: Norberto Limonta
- 1979: Raúl Suárez
- 1980: Jorge Monín
- 1981: Julio Walter Ruiz
- 1982: Juan Adolfo Carrizo
- 1983: Juan Pablo Juárez
- 1984: Juan Pablo Juárez
- 1985: Juan Pablo Juárez
- 1986: Juan Pablo Juárez
- 1987: Juan Pablo Juárez
- 1988: Antonio Silio
- 1989: Marcelo Cascabelo
- 1990: Jorge Sosa
- 1991: Oscar Amaya
- 1992: Oscar Raimo
- 1993: Oscar Amaya
- 1994: Antonio Silio
- 1995: Miguel Aguilar (CHI)
- 1996: Miguel Aguilar (CHI)
- 1997: Oscar Raimo
- 1998: José Montenegro
- 1999: Miguel Aguilar (CHI)
- 2000: José Mansilla
- 2001: Oscar Amaya
- 2002: José Mansilla
- 2003: Juan Suárez
- 2004: Ulises Sanguinetti
- 2005: Juan Suárez
- 2006: Sergio Lencina

=== 3000 metres steeplechase ===
- 1960F: Carlos Ricci
- 1960C: Not held
- 1961: Possibly not held
- 1962: Alberto Ríos
- 1963: Domingo Amaizón
- 1964: Antonio Artaza
- 1965: Domingo Amaizón
- 1966: Antonio Artaza
- 1967: Carlos Loto
- 1968: Domingo Amaizón
- 1969: Carlos Loto
- 1970: Carlos Loto
- 1971: Domingo Amaizón
- 1972: Abel Córdoba
- 1973: Domingo Amaizón
- 1974: Héctor Córdoba
- 1975: Abel Córdoba
- 1976: Domingo Amaizón
- 1977: Abel Córdoba
- 1978: Raimundo Manquel
- 1979: Norberto Limonta
- 1980: Abel Córdoba
- 1981: Claudio Herrero
- 1982: Diego Zarba
- 1983: Marcelo Cascabelo
- 1984: Marcelo Cascabelo
- 1985: Marcelo Cascabelo
- 1986: Marcelo Cascabelo
- 1987: Carlos Naput
- 1988: Marcelo Cascabelo
- 1989: Oscar Amaya
- 1990: Oscar Amaya
- 1991: Carlos Naput
- 1992: Ramiro Paris
- 1993: Mariano Tarilo
- 1994: Antonio Soliz
- 1995: Antonio Soliz
- 1996: Ramiro Paris
- 1997: Julián Peralta
- 1998: Mariano Tarilo
- 1999: Mariano Tarilo
- 2000: Mariano Tarilo
- 2001: Mariano Tarilo
- 2002: Esteban Coria
- 2003: Mariano Mastromarino
- 2004: Mariano Mastromarino
- 2005: Mariano Mastromarino
- 2006: Mariano Mastromarino

=== 110 metres hurdles ===
- 1960F: Juan Carlos Dyrzka
- 1960C: Jorge Rico
- 1961: Guillermo Vallanía
- 1962: Juan Carlos Dyrzka
- 1963: Guillermo Vallanía
- 1964: Guillermo Vallanía
- 1965: Raúl Domínguez
- 1966: Juan Carlos Dyrzka
- 1967: Juan Carlos Dyrzka
- 1968: Miguel Perotti
- 1969: Juan Carlos Dyrzka
- 1970: Marcelo Tiberi
- 1971: Francisco Rosetto
- 1972: Francisco Rosetto
- 1973: Francisco Rosetto
- 1974: Hugo Tanino
- 1975: Tito Steiner
- 1976: Rodolfo Iturraspe
- 1977: Rodolfo Iturraspe
- 1978: Guillermo Gago
- 1979: Pablo Bianchi
- 1980: Rodolfo Iturraspe
- 1981: Rodolfo Iturraspe
- 1982: Javier Olivar
- 1983: Carlos Varas
- 1984: Carlos Varas
- 1985: Carlos Varas
- 1986: Carlos Varas
- 1987: Carlos Varas
- 1988: Carlos McGarry
- 1989: Carlos McGarry
- 1990: Diego Mur
- 1991: Oscar Ratto
- 1992: Oscar Ratto
- 1993: Ricardo D'Andrilli
- 1994: Oscar Ratto
- 1995: Oscar Ratto
- 1996: Oscar Ratto
- 1997: Oscar Ratto
- 1998: Pablo Ribone
- 1999: Oscar Ratto
- 2000: Oscar Ratto
- 2001: Oscar Ratto
- 2002: Diego Morán
- 2003: Leandro Peyrano
- 2004: Leandro Peyrano
- 2005: Leandro Peyrano
- 2006: Leandro Peyrano

=== 400 metres hurdles ===
- 1960F: Juan Carlos Dyrzka
- 1960C: Jorge Rico
- 1961: Osvaldo Fernández
- 1962: Juan Carlos Dyrzka
- 1963: Juan Mazza
- 1964: Juan Mazza
- 1965: Mario Mazza
- 1966: Juan Carlos Dyrzka
- 1967: Juan Carlos Dyrzka
- 1968: Alfredo Sánchez
- 1969: Juan Carlos Dyrzka
- 1970: Marcelo Tiberi
- 1971: Rubén Paulo
- 1972: Marcelo Tiberi
- 1973: Roberto Comisso
- 1974: Hugo Tanino
- 1975: Hugo Tanino
- 1976: Guillermo Gago
- 1977: Guillermo Gago
- 1978: Guillermo Gago
- 1979: Guillermo Gago
- 1980: Jorge Barrera
- 1981: Jorge Díaz
- 1982: Jorge Díaz
- 1983: Jorge Díaz
- 1984: Jorge Díaz
- 1985: Jorge Díaz
- 1986: Dardo Angerami
- 1987: Fernando Marzano
- 1988: Fernando Marzano
- 1989: Dardo Angerami
- 1990: Miguel Pérez
- 1991: Dardo Angerami
- 1992: Miguel Pérez
- 1993: Miguel Pérez
- 1994: Gabriel Corradini
- 1995: Miguel Pérez
- 1996: Miguel Pérez
- 1997: Miguel Pérez
- 1998: Santiago Lorenzo
- 1999: Gabriel Heredia
- 2000: Gabriel Heredia
- 2001: Gabriel Heredia
- 2002: Facundo Aranguren
- 2003: José Pignataro
- 2004: Sebastián Lasquera
- 2005: Christian Deymonnaz
- 2006: José Pignataro

== Men's road ==
=== 10K run ===
- 1989: Juan Pablo Juárez

=== 15K run ===
The 1990 championship was held on a short course.

- 1990: Tranquilino Valenzuela
- 1991: Carlos Naput

=== Half marathon ===
The 1995 championship was held on a short course.

- 1994: Tranquilino Valenzuela
- 1995: José Andrada
- 1996: Juan Pablo Juárez
- 1997: Juan Pablo Juárez
- 1998: Oscar Amaya
- 1999: Gustavo Romero
- 2000: Oscar Cortínez
- 2001: Antonio Silio
- 2002: Oscar Cortínez
- 2003: Oscar Cortínez
- 2004: Gustavo Comba
- 2005: Gastón Fuentealba

=== Marathon ===
The 1972 championship was held on a short course.

- 1972: Nazario Araújo
- 1973: Alberto Ríos
- 1974: Alberto Ríos
- 1975: Possibly not held
- 1976: Possibly not held
- 1977: Raimundo Manquel
- 1978: Possibly not held
- 1979: Raúl Llusa
- 1980: Alfredo Maravilla
- 1981: Raúl Suárez
- 1982: Alfredo Maravilla
- 1983: Carlos Orué
- 1984: Rubén Aguiar
- 1985: José Orué
- 1986: Juan Ríos
- 1987: Rubén Aguiar
- 1988: Toribio Gutiérrez
- 1989: Toribio Gutiérrez
- 1990: Carlos Edgar Barría
- 1991: Carlos Edgar Barría
- 1992: Toribio Gutiérrez
- 1993: Tranquilino Valenzuela
- 1994: Toribio Gutiérrez
- 1995: Carlos Edgar Barría
- 1996: Juan Pablo Juárez
- 1997: Toribio Gutiérrez
- 1998: Oscar Alarcón
- 1999: Oscar Cortínez
- 2000: Juan Castro
- 2001: Claudio Burgos
- 2002: Alejandro Giménez
- 2003: Daniel Simbrón
- 2004: Daniel Simbrón
- 2005: Oscar Cortínez

=== 20,000 metres walk ===
- 1992: Juan Ingrata
- 1993: Benjamín Loréfice
- 1994: José Aguilera
- 1995: Jorge Loréfice
- 1996: Not held
- 1997: Jorge Loréfice
- 1998: Jorge Loréfice
- 1999: Jorge Loréfice
- 2000: Jorge Loréfice
- 2001: Not held
- 2002: Not held
- 2003: Jorge Yannone

=== 20 kilometres walk ===
- 1980: Jorge Lannone
- 1981: Possibly not held
- 1982: Possibly not held
- 1983: Possibly not held
- 1984: Possibly not held
- 1985: Possibly not held
- 1986: Jorge Lannone
- 1987: Jorge Lannone
- 1988: Fernando Laterza
- 1989: Jorge Loréfice
- 1990: Jorge Loréfice
- 1991: Benjamín Loréfice
- 1992: Possibly not held
- 1993: Possibly not held
- 1994: Possibly not held
- 1995: Possibly not held
- 1996: Jorge Loréfice
- 1997: Possibly not held
- 1998: Possibly not held
- 1999: Possibly not held
- 2000: Possibly not held
- 2001: Jorge Loréfice
- 2002: Claudio Carrizo
- 2003: Jorge Loréfice
- 2004: Jorge Loréfice
- 2005: Jorge Loréfice
- 2006: Hernán Calderón

== Men's field ==
=== High jump ===
- 1960F: Eleuterio Fassi
- 1960C: Felipe Ramos
- 1961: Horacio Martínez del Sel
- 1962: Horacio Martínez del Sel
- 1963: Eleuterio Fassi
- 1964: Roberto Pozzi
- 1965: Julio Ibarreche
- 1966: Eleuterio Fassi
- 1967: Roberto Pozzi
- 1968: Roberto Pozzi
- 1969: Hugo Castello
- 1970: Rafael Albarracín
- 1971: José Dalmastro
- 1972: Luis Barrionuevo
- 1973: Luis Barrionuevo
- 1974: Rafael Albarracín
- 1975: Daniel Mamet
- 1976: Claudio Lippi
- 1977: Luis Barrionuevo
- 1978: Daniel Mamet
- 1979: Daniel Mamet
- 1980: Fernando Pastoriza
- 1981: Oscar Baronetto
- 1982: Carlos Gambetta
- 1983: Fernando Pastoriza
- 1984: Fernando Pastoriza
- 1985: Fernando Pastoriza
- 1986: Fernando Pastoriza
- 1987: Fernando Pastoriza
- 1988: Fernando Moreno
- 1989: Fernando Pastoriza
- 1990: Fernando Moreno
- 1991: Fernando Moreno
- 1992: Fernando Moreno
- 1993: Fernando Moreno
- 1994: Erasmo Jara
- 1995: Erasmo Jara
- 1996: Erasmo Jara
- 1997: Erasmo Jara
- 1998: Erasmo Jara
- 1999: Erasmo Jara
- 2000: Erasmo Jara
- 2001: Erasmo Jara
- 2002: Erasmo Jara
- 2003: Erasmo Jara
- 2004: Leandro Piedrabuena
- 2005: Erasmo Jara
- 2006: Santiago Guerci

=== Pole vault ===
- 1960F: Mario Eleusippi
- 1960C: Dante Beltrán
- 1961: Ricardo Bonini
- 1962: Mario Eleusippi
- 1963: Juan Carballo
- 1964: Hugo Argat
- 1965: Erico Barney
- 1966: Erico Barney
- 1967: Erico Barney
- 1968: Bienvenido Dell'Aica
- 1969: Daniel Argoitía
- 1970: José Taddeo
- 1971: Bienvenido Dell'Aica
- 1972: Bienvenido Dell'Aica
- 1973: Bienvenido Dell'Aica
- 1974: Felix Woelflin
- 1975: Guillermo Chiaraviglio
- 1976: Guillermo Chiaraviglio
- 1977: Guillermo Meyer
- 1978: Daniel Thorne
- 1979: Guillermo Chiaraviglio
- 1980: Daniel Thorne
- 1981: Guillermo Chiaraviglio
- 1982: Guillermo Chiaraviglio
- 1983: Oscar Veit
- 1984: Oscar Veit
- 1985: Walter Franzantti
- 1986: Oscar Veit
- 1987: Oscar Veit
- 1988: Oscar Veit
- 1989: Oscar Veit
- 1990: Oscar Veit
- 1991: Fernando Pastoriza
- 1992: Oscar Veit
- 1993: Oscar Veit
- 1994: Oscar Veit
- 1995: Oscar Veit
- 1996: Fernando Pastoriza
- 1997: Oscar Veit
- 1998: Javier Benítez
- 1999: Javier Benítez
- 2000: Javier Benítez
- 2001: Javier Benítez
- 2002: Javier Benítez
- 2003: Javier Benítez
- 2004: Germán Chiaraviglio
- 2005: Javier Benítez
- 2006: Germán Chiaraviglio

=== Long jump ===
- 1960F: Ricardo Nicoli
- 1960C: Jorge Caffa
- 1961: Jorge Castillo
- 1962: Jorge Castillo
- 1963: Alfredo Boncagni
- 1964: Alfredo Boncagni
- 1965: Héctor Rivas
- 1966: Alfredo Boncagni
- 1967: Alfredo Boncagni
- 1968: Alfredo Boncagni
- 1969: Alfredo Boncagni
- 1970: Eduardo Labalta
- 1971: Eduardo Labalta
- 1972: Eduardo Labalta
- 1973: Emilio Mazzeo
- 1974: Ariel González
- 1975: Emilio Mazzeo
- 1976: Hugo Meriano
- 1977: Emilio Mazzeo
- 1978: Alfredo Boncagni
- 1979: Eduardo Labalta
- 1980: Angel Gagliano
- 1981: Carlos Gambetta
- 1982: Carlos Gambetta
- 1983: Eduardo Labalta
- 1984: Osvaldo Frigerio
- 1985: Sergio Roh
- 1986: Osvaldo Frigerio
- 1987: Marcelo Miño
- 1988: Alejandro Gats
- 1989: Oscar Veit
- 1990: Alejandro Gats
- 1991: Martín Gallino
- 1992: Néstor Madrid
- 1993: Oscar Veit
- 1994: Néstor Madrid
- 1995: Pablo Silva
- 1996: Diego Vázquez
- 1997: Pablo Silva
- 1998: Leandro Simes
- 1999: Leandro Simes
- 2000: Mariano Sala
- 2001: Diego Suárez
- 2002: Eric Kerwitz
- 2003: Eric Kerwitz
- 2004: Eric Kerwitz
- 2005: Eric Kerwitz
- 2006: Eric Kerwitz

=== Triple jump ===
- 1960F: Raúl Castagnino
- 1960C: Arturo Arancibia
- 1961: Jorge Castillo
- 1962: Julio Ibarreche
- 1963: Mario Medrano
- 1964: Jorge Castillo
- 1965: Jorge Vuelta
- 1966: Hugo Tombolini
- 1967: Hugo Tombolini
- 1968: Enrique Casco
- 1969: Ariel González
- 1970: Angel Gagliano
- 1971: Masaya Higa
- 1972: Masaya Higa
- 1973: Emilio Mazzeo
- 1974: Emilio Mazzeo
- 1975: Angel Gagliano
- 1976: Emilio Mazzeo
- 1977: Angel Gagliano
- 1978: Angel Gagliano
- 1979: Angel Gagliano
- 1980: Angel Gagliano
- 1981: Jorge Mazzeo
- 1982: Jorge Mazzeo
- 1983: Angel Gagliano
- 1984: Fabián Plajta
- 1985: Angel Gagliano
- 1986: Angel Gagliano
- 1987: Néstor Alaniz
- 1988: Alejandro Gats
- 1989: Fabián Di Leo
- 1990: Alejandro Gats
- 1991: Fabián Di Leo
- 1992: Fernando Pecchenino
- 1993: Fernando Pecchenino
- 1994: Juan Carlos Chávez
- 1995: Pablo Macías
- 1996: Pablo Macías
- 1997: Alejandro Gats
- 1998: Leandro Simes
- 1999: Pablo Macías
- 2000: Mariano Sala
- 2001: Leandro Simes
- 2002: Mariano Sala
- 2003: Mariano Sala
- 2004: Marcelo Pichipil
- 2005: Martin Falico
- 2006: Gustavo Ochoa

=== Shot put ===
- 1960F: Enrique Helf
- 1960C: Roque Eguillor
- 1961: Enrique Helf
- 1962: Enrique Helf
- 1963: Luis Di Cursi
- 1964: Luis Di Cursi
- 1965: Mario Peretti
- 1966: Enrique Pilarche
- 1967: Mario Peretti
- 1968: Mario Peretti
- 1969: Juan Adolfo Turri
- 1970: Juan Adolfo Turri
- 1971: Mario Peretti
- 1972: Juan Adolfo Turri
- 1973: Juan Adolfo Turri
- 1974: Juan Adolfo Turri
- 1975: Juan Adolfo Turri
- 1976: José Vallejo
- 1977: Néstor Sánchez
- 1978: Tito Steiner
- 1979: Néstor Sánchez
- 1980: Gerardo Carucci
- 1981: Juan Adolfo Turri
- 1982: Gerardo Carucci
- 1983: Gerardo Carucci
- 1984: Gerardo Carucci
- 1985: Gerardo Carucci
- 1986: Gerardo Carucci
- 1987: Gerardo Carucci
- 1988: Gerardo Carucci
- 1989: Marcelo Pugliese
- 1990: Andrés Charadía
- 1991: Andrés Charadía
- 1992: Adrián Marzo
- 1993: Adrián Marzo
- 1994: Adrián Marzo
- 1995: Adrián Marzo
- 1996: Adrián Marzo
- 1997: Marcelo Pugliese
- 1998: Adrián Marzo
- 1999: Francisco Pinter
- 2000: Adrián Marzo
- 2001: Andrés Calvo
- 2002: Adrián Marzo
- 2003: Adrián Marzo
- 2004: Adrián Marzo
- 2005: Germán Lauro
- 2006: Germán Lauro

=== Discus throw ===
- 1960F: Günther Kruse
- 1960C: Roque Eguillor
- 1961: Enrique Helf
- 1962: Enrique Helf
- 1963: Luis Di Cursi
- 1964: Luis Di Cursi
- 1965: Mario Peretti
- 1966: Juan Báez
- 1967: Mario Peretti
- 1968: Hugo Bassetti
- 1969: Enrique Di Paolo
- 1970: Esteban Drapich
- 1971: Mario Peretti
- 1972: Hugo Bassetti
- 1973: Esteban Drapich
- 1974: José Vallejo
- 1975: Juan Adolfo Turri
- 1976: Hugo Bassetti
- 1977: Héctor Rivero
- 1978: Héctor Rivero
- 1979: José Vallejo
- 1980: Ubaldo Oscar Peñalba
- 1981: Norberto Aimé
- 1982: Carlos Brynner
- 1983: Carlos Brynner
- 1984: Antonio da Cunha
- 1985: Carlos Brynner
- 1986: Gerardo Carucci
- 1987: Gerardo Carucci
- 1988: Marcelo Pugliese
- 1989: Marcelo Pugliese
- 1990: Andrés Charadía
- 1991: Marcelo Pugliese
- 1992: Marcelo Pugliese
- 1993: Marcelo Pugliese
- 1994: Marcelo Pugliese
- 1995: Marcelo Pugliese
- 1996: Marcelo Pugliese
- 1997: Marcelo Pugliese
- 1998: Marcelo Pugliese
- 1999: Marcelo Pugliese
- 2000: Marcelo Pugliese
- 2001: Marcelo Pugliese
- 2002: Marcelo Pugliese
- 2003: Marcelo Pugliese
- 2004: Jorge Balliengo
- 2005: Jorge Balliengo
- 2006: Jorge Balliengo

=== Hammer throw ===
- 1960F: Hugo Watle
- 1960C: Jorge Lucero
- 1961: Carlos Marzo
- 1962: José Vallejo
- 1963: José Vallejo
- 1964: Alberto Corvatta
- 1965: Alberto Corvatta
- 1966: José Vallejo
- 1967: Alberto Corvatta
- 1968: José Vallejo
- 1969: Carlos Gatica
- 1970: José Vallejo
- 1971: José Vallejo
- 1972: José Vallejo
- 1973: José Vallejo
- 1974: José Vallejo
- 1975: José Vallejo
- 1976: José Vallejo
- 1977: Daniel Gómez
- 1978: José Vallejo
- 1979: José Vallejo
- 1980: Daniel Gómez
- 1981: Ernesto Iglesias
- 1982: Daniel Gómez
- 1983: Roberto Olcese
- 1984: Daniel Gómez
- 1985: Daniel Gómez
- 1986: Andrés Charadía
- 1987: Andrés Charadía
- 1988: Andrés Charadía
- 1989: Andrés Charadía
- 1990: Andrés Charadía
- 1991: Andrés Charadía
- 1992: Andrés Charadía
- 1993: Andrés Charadía
- 1994: Andrés Charadía
- 1995: Juan Ignacio Cerra
- 1996: Adrián Marzo
- 1997: Juan Ignacio Cerra
- 1998: Adrián Marzo
- 1999: Juan Ignacio Cerra
- 2000: Juan Ignacio Cerra
- 2001: Adrián Marzo
- 2002: Adrián Marzo
- 2003: Juan Ignacio Cerra
- 2004: Juan Ignacio Cerra
- 2005: Juan Ignacio Cerra
- 2006: Juan Ignacio Cerra

=== Javelin throw ===
- 1960F: Ricardo Héber
- 1960C: C. Santillán
- 1961: Antolín Rodríguez
- 1962: Ricardo Héber
- 1963: Antolín Rodríguez
- 1964: Ian Barney
- 1965: Oscar Bustamante
- 1966: Ian Barney
- 1967: Rafael Difonzo
- 1968: Máximo Gromik
- 1969: Ricardo Héber
- 1970: Néstor Pietrobelli
- 1971: Ricardo Héber
- 1972: Rolf Bühler
- 1973: Dante Bertorello
- 1974: Néstor Pietrobelli
- 1975: Ramón Ángel Garmendia
- 1976: Ramón Ángel Garmendia
- 1977: Ramón Ángel Garmendia
- 1978: Ramón Ángel Garmendia
- 1979: Ramón Ángel Garmendia
- 1980: Ramón Ángel Garmendia
- 1981: Ramón Ángel Garmendia
- 1982: Juan Garmendia
- 1983: Juan Garmendia
- 1984: Jesús López Ordaz
- 1985: Jesús López Ordaz
- 1986: Walter Franzantti
- 1987: Juan Garmendia
- 1988: Juan Garmendia
- 1989: Juan Garmendia
- 1990: Alan Dashwood
- 1991: Alan Dashwood
- 1992: Juan Garmendia
- 1993: Juan Garmendia
- 1994: Mauricio Silva
- 1995: Néstor Giménez
- 1996: Mauricio Silva
- 1997: Néstor Giménez
- 1998: Mauricio Silva
- 1999: Mauricio Silva
- 2000: Pablo Pietrobelli
- 2001: Pablo Pietrobelli
- 2002: Pablo Pietrobelli
- 2003: Pablo Pietrobelli
- 2004: Alejandro Ionsky
- 2005: Pablo Pietrobelli
- 2006: Pablo Pietrobelli

=== Decathlon ===
The 1980 decathlon had an irregular standard in the shot put.

- 1960F: Antonio Hiebra
- 1960C: Not held
- 1961: Rubén Salvatori
- 1962: Oscar Bártoli
- 1963: Héctor Rivas
- 1964: Héctor Rivas
- 1965: Julio Ibarreche
- 1966: Juan Carlos Kerwitz
- 1967: Juan Carlos Kerwitz
- 1968: Juan Carlos Kerwitz
- 1969: Ariel González
- 1970: Emilio Mazzeo
- 1971: Emilio Mazzeo
- 1972: Tito Steiner
- 1973: Tito Steiner
- 1974: Alberto Fernández
- 1975: Roberto Steinmetz
- 1976: Tito Steiner
- 1977: Sergio Mastrovic
- 1978: Tito Steiner
- 1979: Guillermo Chiaraviglio
- 1980: Hugo Giménez
- 1981: Hugo Giménez
- 1982: Hugo Giménez
- 1983: Carlos Martín
- 1984: Carlos Martín
- 1985: Carlos Martín
- 1986: Possibly not held
- 1987: Martín Badano
- 1988: Martín Badano
- 1989: Oscar Veit
- 1990: Fernando Fondello
- 1991: Rodrigo Retamal
- 1992: Fabio Suárez
- 1993: Gustavo Occhiuzzo
- 1994: Diego Kerwitz
- 1995: Diego Kerwitz
- 1996: Diego Kerwitz
- 1997: Santiago Lorenzo
- 1998: Diego Kerwitz
- 1999: Enrique Aguirre
- 2000: Enrique Aguirre
- 2001: Eric Kerwitz
- 2002: Enrique Aguirre
- 2003: Enrique Aguirre
- 2004: Enrique Aguirre
- 2005: Leandro Peyrano
- 2006: Enrique Aguirre

=== Cross country (long course) ===
- 1971: Domingo Amaizón
- 1972: Abel Córdoba
- 1973: Abel Córdoba
- 1974: Domingo Amaizón
- 1975: Heraldo Cuevas
- 1976: Not held
- 1977: Not held
- 1978: Not held
- 1979: Not held
- 1980: Alfredo Maravilla
- 1981: Jorge Monín
- 1982: Ramón Busquet
- 1983: Luis Esterio
- 1984: Fernando Marrón
- 1985: Aldo Pérez
- 1986: Julio César Gómez
- 1987: Carlos Pérez
- 1988: Antonio Silio
- 1989: Antonio Silio
- 1990: Carlos Umpiérrez
- 1991: Oscar Amaya
- 1992: Leonardo Malgor
- 1993: Juan Pablo Juárez
- 1994: Tranquilino Valenzuela
- 1995: Carlos Umpiérrez
- 1996: Tranquilino Valenzuela
- 1997: Zenón Patiño
- 1998: Iván Noms
- 1999: José Montenegro
- 2000: Oscar Amaya
- 2001: Ricardo Franzón
- 2002: Daniel Castro
- 2003: Oscar Amaya
- 2004: Daniel Castro
- 2005: Oscar Cortínez

=== Cross country (short course) ===
- 1999: Oscar Raimo
- 2000: José Mansilla
- 2001: Julián Peralta
- 2002: Gustavo Romero
- 2003: César Troncoso
- 2004: Ulises Sanguinetti
- 2005: Ulises Sanguinetti

== Women's track ==
=== 100 metres ===
- 1960F: Mabel Farina
- 1960C: Alba Balocco
- 1961: Marta Buongiorno
- 1962: Margarita Formeiro
- 1963: Margarita Formeiro
- 1964: Cristina Irurzun
- 1965: Margarita Formeiro
- 1966: Cristina Irurzun
- 1967: Alicia Kaufmanas
- 1968: Alicia Kaufmanas
- 1969: Irene Fitzner
- 1970: Elba Martín
- 1971: Liliana Cragno
- 1972: Liliana Cragno
- 1973: Liliana Cragno
- 1974: Belkis Fava
- 1975: Beatriz Allocco
- 1976: Beatriz Allocco
- 1977: Beatriz Allocco
- 1978: Beatriz Allocco
- 1979: Belkis Fava
- 1980: Adriana Pero
- 1981: Marisol Besada
- 1982: Adriana Pero
- 1983: Andrea Barabino
- 1984: Mirta Forgione
- 1985: Deborah Bell
- 1986: Deborah Bell
- 1987: Deborah Bell
- 1988: Laura de Falco
- 1989: Ana María Comaschi
- 1990: Denise Sharpe
- 1991: Anabella von Kesselstatt
- 1992: Ana María Comaschi
- 1993: Daniela Lebreo
- 1994: Daniela Lebreo
- 1995: Olga Conte
- 1996: Olga Conte
- 1997: Olga Conte
- 1998: Vanesa Vallejos
- 1999: Verónica Depaoli
- 2000: Vanesa Wohlgemuth
- 2001: Vanesa Wohlgemuth
- 2002: Vanesa Wohlgemuth
- 2003: Vanesa Wohlgemuth
- 2004: Vanesa Wohlgemuth
- 2005: Vanesa Wohlgemuth
- 2006: Liliana Tantucci

=== 200 metres ===
- 1960F: Ada Brener
- 1960C: Alba Balocco
- 1961: Marta Buongiorno
- 1962: Ada Brener
- 1963: Marta Buongiorno
- 1964: Cristina Irurzun
- 1965: Emilia Dyrzka
- 1966: Liliana Cragno
- 1967: Cristina Filgueira
- 1968: Lidia Potocki
- 1969: Susana Acatto
- 1970: Cristina Filgueira
- 1971: Ángela Godoy
- 1972: Liliana Cragno
- 1973: Beatriz Allocco
- 1974: Belkis Fava
- 1975: Beatriz Allocco
- 1976: Beatriz Allocco
- 1977: Beatriz Allocco
- 1978: Beatriz Allocco
- 1979: Belkis Fava
- 1980: Beatriz Capotosto
- 1981: Susana Jenkins
- 1982: Adriana Pero
- 1983: Andrea Barabino
- 1984: Graciela Palacín
- 1985: Graciela Palacín
- 1986: Olga Conte
- 1987: Deborah Bell
- 1988: Olga Conte
- 1989: Olga Conte
- 1990: Ana María Comaschi
- 1991: Denise Sharpe
- 1992: Olga Conte
- 1993: Daniela Lebreo
- 1994: Daniela Lebreo
- 1995: Olga Conte
- 1996: Olga Conte
- 1997: Olga Conte
- 1998: Olga Conte
- 1999: Vanesa Wohlgemuth
- 2000: Vanesa Wohlgemuth
- 2001: Vanesa Wohlgemuth
- 2002: Vanesa Wohlgemuth
- 2003: Daniela Lebreo
- 2004: Vanesa Wohlgemuth
- 2005: Vanesa Wohlgemuth
- 2006: Liliana Tantucci

=== 400 metres ===
- 1969: Cristina Filgueira
- 1970: Cristina Filgueira
- 1971: Cristina Filgueira
- 1972: Cristina Irurzun
- 1973: Graciela Ghelfi
- 1974: Graciela Ghelfi
- 1975: Graciela Ghelfi
- 1976: Sonia Nerpiti
- 1977: Marcela López Espinosa
- 1978: María Elviva Fernández
- 1979: Marcela López Espinosa
- 1980: Silvia Augsburger
- 1981: Silvia Augsburger
- 1982: Marcela López Espinosa
- 1983: Andrea Fuchs
- 1984: María Elena Croatto
- 1985: María Elena Croatto
- 1986: María del Carmen Mosegui (URU)
- 1987: Olga Conte
- 1988: Olga Conte
- 1989: Olga Conte
- 1990: Milagros Allende
- 1991: Patricia Oroño
- 1992: Anabella von Kesselstatt
- 1993: Ana María Comaschi
- 1994: Ana María Comaschi
- 1995: Olga Conte
- 1996: Olga Conte
- 1997: Olga Conte
- 1998: Marina Arias
- 1999: Andrea Rossotti
- 2000: Andrea Rossotti
- 2001: Cristina Ferrarini
- 2002: Anabella von Kesselstatt
- 2003: Andrea Rossotti
- 2004: Anabella von Kesselstatt
- 2005: Andrea Rossotti
- 2006: María Maldonado

=== 800 metres ===
- 1968: Alicia Enríquez
- 1969: Iris Fernández
- 1970: Iris Fernández
- 1971: Iris Fernández
- 1972: Iris Fernández
- 1973: Cristina Sinitsch
- 1974: Cristina Sinitsch
- 1975: Ana María Nielsen
- 1976: Silvia Augsburger
- 1977: Marcela López Espinosa
- 1978: Marcela López Espinosa
- 1979: Marcela López Espinosa
- 1980: Silvia Augsburger
- 1981: Silvia Augsburger
- 1982: Silvia Augsburger
- 1983: Marta Ressia
- 1984: Liliana Mariel Góngora
- 1985: Liliana Mariel Góngora
- 1986: María del Carmen Mosegui (URU)
- 1987: Viviana Cortés
- 1988: Mabel Arrúa
- 1989: Mabel Arrúa
- 1990: Mabel Arrúa
- 1991: Paula Val
- 1992: Paula Val
- 1993: Alejandra Cepeda
- 1994: Marta Orellana
- 1995: Marta Orellana
- 1996: Marta Orellana
- 1997: Paula Tello Alonso
- 1998: María Peralta
- 1999: María Peralta
- 2000: María Peralta
- 2001: Laura Garciarena
- 2002: Valeria Rodríguez
- 2003: Andrea Rossotti
- 2004: Andrea Rossotti
- 2005: Andrea Rossotti
- 2006: María Peralta

=== 1500 metres ===
- 1970: Iris Fernández
- 1971: Iris Fernández
- 1972: Iris Fernández
- 1973: Cristina Sinitsch
- 1974: Cristina Sinitsch
- 1975: Ana María Nielsen
- 1976: Silvia Augsburger
- 1977: Sonia Molina
- 1978: Ana María Nielsen
- 1979: Sonia Molina
- 1980: Sonia Molina
- 1981: Liliana Mariel Góngora
- 1982: Liliana Mariel Góngora
- 1983: Liliana Mariel Góngora
- 1984: Liliana Mariel Góngora
- 1985: Liliana Mariel Góngora
- 1986: Liliana Mariel Góngora
- 1987: Nora Wiedemer
- 1988: Mabel Arrúa
- 1989: Mabel Arrúa
- 1990: Mabel Arrúa
- 1991: Paula Val
- 1992: Paula Val
- 1993: Marta Orellana
- 1994: Miriam Ríos
- 1995: Marta Orellana
- 1996: Marta Orellana
- 1997: Elisa Cobañea
- 1998: María Peralta
- 1999: María Peralta
- 2000: María Peralta
- 2001: Valeria Rodríguez
- 2002: Valeria Rodríguez
- 2003: Natalia Siviero
- 2004: María Peralta
- 2005: Valeria Rodríguez
- 2006: María Peralta

=== 3000 metres ===
- 1977: Iris Fernández
- 1978: Olga Caccaviello
- 1979: Olga Caccaviello
- 1980: Olga Caccaviello
- 1981: Olga Caccaviello
- 1982: Olga Caccaviello
- 1983: María Gazaza
- 1984: Margot Vargas
- 1985: María Victoria Biondi
- 1986: Adriana Calvo
- 1987: Elisa Cobañea
- 1988: Stella Maris Selles
- 1989: Norma Fernández
- 1990: Elisa Cobañea
- 1991: María Inés Rodríguez
- 1992: Virginia Fuente
- 1993: Miriam Ríos

=== 5000 metres ===
- 1983: Sonia Molina
- 1984: Margot Vargas
- 1985: Olga Caccaviello
- 1986: Not held
- 1987: Not held
- 1988: Not held
- 1989: Not held
- 1990: Not held
- 1991: Not held
- 1992: Not held
- 1993: Not held
- 1994: María Inés Rodríguez
- 1995: Elisa Cobañea
- 1996: María Inés Rodríguez
- 1997: Elisa Cobañea
- 1998: Lelys Salazar
- 1999: Claudia Camargo
- 2000: Nadia Rodríguez
- 2001: Valeria Rodríguez
- 2002: Claudia Camargo
- 2003: Karina Córdoba
- 2004: Karina Córdoba
- 2005: Sandra Amarillo
- 2006: Karina Córdoba

=== 10,000 metres ===
- 1986: Elisa Cobañea
- 1987: Elisa Cobañea
- 1988: Stella Maris Selles
- 1989: Adriana Calvo
- 1990: Elisa Cobañea
- 1991: María Inés Rodríguez
- 1992: Marta Orellana
- 1993: Vilma Pailos
- 1994: Elisa Cobañea
- 1995: Adriana Calvo
- 1996: Vilma Pailos
- 1997: Mónica Cervera
- 1998: Marcela Araújo
- 1999: Sandra Torres Álvarez
- 2000: Claudia Camargo
- 2001: Estela Martínez
- 2002: Estela Martínez
- 2003: Sandra Torres Álvarez
- 2004: Roxana Preussler
- 2005: Roxana Preussler
- 2006: Sandra Torres Álvarez

=== 80 metres hurdles ===
- 1960F: Ada Brener
- 1960C: Marta Santine
- 1961: Graciela Paviotti
- 1962: Emilia Dyrzka
- 1963: Graciela Paviotti
- 1964: Emilia Dyrzka
- 1965: Emilia Dyrzka
- 1966: Ana María Michelini
- 1967: Graciela Paviotti
- 1968: Liliana Cragno

=== 100 metres hurdles ===
- 1969: Alicia Cantarini
- 1970: Alicia Cantarini
- 1971: Emilia Dyrzka
- 1972: Lelia Scipioni
- 1973: Emilia Dyrzka
- 1974: Mónica Rodríguez
- 1975: Inés Jerabek
- 1976: Susana Planas
- 1977: Yvonne Neddermann
- 1978: Beatriz Capotosto
- 1979: Inés Jerabek
- 1980: Beatriz Capotosto
- 1981: Beatriz Capotosto
- 1982: Beatriz Capotosto
- 1983: Beatriz Capotosto
- 1984: Adriana Sandes
- 1985: Beatriz Capotosto
- 1986: Graciela Pugliese
- 1987: Beatriz Capotosto
- 1988: Liliana Derfler
- 1989: Beatriz Capotosto
- 1990: Ana María Comaschi
- 1991: Anabella von Kesselstatt
- 1992: Ana María Comaschi
- 1993: Verónica Depaoli
- 1994: Verónica Depaoli
- 1995: Alejandra García
- 1996: Alejandra García
- 1997: Verónica Depaoli
- 1998: Verónica Depaoli
- 1999: Verónica Depaoli
- 2000: Verónica Depaoli
- 2001: Verónica Depaoli
- 2002: Anabella von Kesselstatt
- 2003: María Azzato
- 2004: Alejandra Llorente
- 2005: María Azzato
- 2006: María Azzato

=== 400 metres hurdles ===
- 1977: Silvia Morandi
- 1978: Anabella Dal Lago
- 1979: Gladys Gandulfo
- 1980: Gladys Gandulfo
- 1981: Anabella Dal Lago
- 1982: Mariana Pösz
- 1983: Anabella Dal Lago
- 1984: Laura Arriarán
- 1985: Ana María Comaschi
- 1986: Ana Laura Paz
- 1987: Paula Val
- 1988: Paula Val
- 1989: Anabella von Kesselstatt
- 1990: Anabella von Kesselstatt
- 1991: Anabella von Kesselstatt
- 1992: Anabella von Kesselstatt
- 1993: Verónica Depaoli
- 1994: Sandra Izquierdo
- 1995: Sandra Izquierdo
- 1996: Verónica Depaoli
- 1997: Verónica Depaoli
- 1998: Verónica Depaoli
- 1999: Cora Olivero
- 2000: Verónica Depaoli
- 2001: Cristina Ferrarini
- 2002: Anabella von Kesselstatt
- 2003: Verónica Barraza
- 2004: Anabella von Kesselstatt
- 2005: Verónica Barraza
- 2006: Soledad Bellucci

=== 3000 metres steeplechase ===
- 1999: Verónica Páez
- 2000: Verónica Páez
- 2001: Claudia Camargo
- 2002: Claudia Camargo
- 2003: María Peralta
- 2004: Rosa Godoy
- 2005: María Peralta
- 2006: Rosa Godoy

== Women's road ==
=== 7K run ===
- 1989: Stella Maris Selles

=== 15K run ===
The 1990 race was held on a short course.

- 1990: María Inés Rodríguez
- 1991: Zulma Ortiz

=== Half marathon ===
The 1995 race was held on a short course.

- 1983: Iris Fernández
- 1984: Stella Maris Selles
- 1985: Graciela Bargas
- 1986: Stella Maris Selles
- 1987: Griselda González
- 1988: Agueda Di Gregorio
- 1989: Not held
- 1990: Not held
- 1991: Not held
- 1992: Possibly not held
- 1993: Possibly not held
- 1994: Norma Quevedo
- 1995: Verónica Páez
- 1996: Verónica Páez
- 1997: Adriana Calvo
- 1998: Lelys Salazar
- 1999: Mónica Cervera
- 2000: Elisa Cobañea
- 2001: Elisa Cobañea
- 2002: Sandra Torres Álvarez
- 2003: Verónica Páez
- 2004: Carina Allay
- 2005: Carina Allay

=== Marathon ===
- 1988: Ethel Bárzola
- 1989: Mirta Febles
- 1990: Gloria Vera
- 1991: Nélida de Farías
- 1992: Mirta Febles
- 1993: Mirta Navea
- 1994: Neilida Olivet
- 1995: María Teresa Aguerre
- 1996: María Inés Rodríguez
- 1997: Griselda González
- 1998: Mónica Cervera
- 1999: Sandra Torres Álvarez
- 2000: Claudia Camargo
- 2001: Sandra Torres Álvarez
- 2002: Adriana Calvo
- 2003: Verónica Páez
- 2004: Sandra Torres Álvarez
- 2005: Verónica Páez

=== 10,000 metres walk ===
The 1996 race was held as a road event.

- 1986: Ofelia Puyol
- 1987: Mirta Casal
- 1988: Mirta Casal
- 1989: Lidia Carriego
- 1990: Lidia Carriego
- 1991: Lidia Carriego
- 1992: Graciela Maidana
- 1993: Lidia Carriego
- 1994: Lidia Carriego
- 1995: Lidia Carriego
- 1996: Andrea Dell'Isola
- 1997: Lidia Carriego
- 1998: Lidia Carriego

=== 20,000 metres walk ===
- 1999: Ofelia Puyol
- 2000: Ofelia Puyol
- 2001: Not held
- 2002: Not held
- 2003: Lidia Carriego

=== 20 kilometres walk ===
- 2001: Gladys Gibert
- 2002: Lidia Carriego
- 2003: Lidia Carriego
- 2004: Lidia Carriego
- 2005: Lidia Carriego
- 2006: Lidia Carriego

== Women's field ==
=== High jump ===
- 1960F: Ana Erb
- 1960C: Marta Millán
- 1961: Graciela Paviotti
- 1962: Isabel Ramírez
- 1963: Graciela Paviotti
- 1964: Isabel Ramírez
- 1965: Mabel Farina
- 1966: Lila Negro
- 1967: Lila Negro
- 1968: Ana María Estrada
- 1969: Lila Negro
- 1970: Ana María Estrada
- 1971: Lila Negro
- 1972: Mónica Rodríguez
- 1973: Ana María Estrada
- 1974: Norma Rogatky
- 1975: Roxana Pereña
- 1976: Diana Celeiro
- 1977: Roxana Pereña
- 1978: not contested
- 1979: Liliana Arigoni
- 1980: Mónica Halporn
- 1981: Liliana Arigoni & Mónica Halporn
- 1982: Diana Picabea
- 1983: Liliana Arigoni
- 1984: Ana María Olivar
- 1985: Ana María Olivar
- 1986: Nancy Piva
- 1987: Nancy Piva
- 1988: Liliana Derfler
- 1989: Andrea Ávila
- 1990: Liliana Derfler
- 1991: Liliana Derfler
- 1992: Alejandra García
- 1993: Solange Witteveen
- 1994: Mariela Andrade
- 1995: Solange Witteveen
- 1996: Alejandra García
- 1997: Solange Witteveen
- 1998: Delfina Blaquier
- 1999: Solange Witteveen
- 2000: Ana Berg
- 2001: Solange Witteveen
- 2002: Claudia Casals
- 2003: Claudia Casals
- 2004: Solange Witteveen
- 2005: Solange Witteveen
- 2006: Daniela Crespo

=== Pole vault ===
- 1994: Mariana Falcioni
- 1995: Alejandra García
- 1996: Alejandra García
- 1997: Alejandra García
- 1998: Alejandra García
- 1999: Alejandra García
- 2000: Alejandra García
- 2001: Alejandra García
- 2002: Alejandra García
- 2003: Alejandra García
- 2004: Alejandra García
- 2005: Alejandra García
- 2006: Carolina Dalurzo

=== Long jump ===
- 1960F: Ada Brener
- 1960C: Possibly not held
- 1961: Graciela Paviotti
- 1962: Alicia Kaufmanas
- 1963: Possibly not held
- 1964: Cristina Irurzun
- 1965: Alicia Kaufmanas
- 1966: Alicia Kaufmanas
- 1967: Alicia Kaufmanas
- 1968: Alicia Kaufmanas
- 1969: Alicia Kaufmanas
- 1970: Matilde Pablo
- 1971: Ana Clara Goldman
- 1972: Lelia Scipioni
- 1973: Lelia Scipioni
- 1974: Norma Rogatky
- 1975: Christa Sommersguter
- 1976: Yvonne Neddermann
- 1977: Yvonne Neddermann
- 1978: Yvonne Neddermann
- 1979: Araceli Bruschini
- 1980: Laura Rivarola
- 1981: Araceli Bruschini
- 1982: Araceli Bruschini
- 1983: Liliana Derfler
- 1984: Zoraya Rodríguez
- 1985: Silvia Murialdo
- 1986: Ana Martina Vizioli
- 1987: Andrea Ávila
- 1988: Ana Martina Vizioli
- 1989: Andrea Ávila
- 1990: Andrea Ávila
- 1991: Sandra Izquierdo
- 1992: Andrea Ávila
- 1993: Andrea Ávila
- 1994: Andrea Ávila
- 1995: Alejandra García
- 1996: Alejandra García
- 1997: Andrea Ávila
- 1998: Andrea Ávila
- 1999: Andrea Ávila
- 2000: Andrea Ávila
- 2001: Andrea Ávila
- 2002: Soledad Donzino
- 2003: Andrea Morales
- 2004: Alejandra Llorente
- 2005: Andrea Bordalejo
- 2006: Andrea Bordalejo

=== Triple jump ===
- 1990: Andrea Ávila
- 1991: Liliana Derfler
- 1992: Andrea Ávila
- 1993: Andrea Ávila
- 1994: Andrea Ávila
- 1995: Solange Witteveen
- 1996: Leticia Solari
- 1997: Andrea Ávila
- 1998: Andrea Ávila
- 1999: Andrea Ávila
- 2000: Andrea Ávila
- 2001: Andrea Ávila
- 2002: Valeria Soplanes
- 2003: Dayana Sastre (URU)
- 2004: Nathalie Patiño
- 2005: Dayana Sastre (URU)
- 2006: Verónica Desimoni

=== Shot put ===
- 1960F: Ingeborg Pfüller
- 1960C: Yolanda Rey
- 1961: Ingeborg Pfüller
- 1962: Ingeborg Mello
- 1963: Ingeborg Pfüller
- 1964: Norma Suárez
- 1965: Norma Suárez
- 1966: Norma Suárez
- 1967: Emilia Dyrzka
- 1968: Gladys Ortega
- 1969: Ana Julieta Scursoni
- 1970: Gladys Ortega
- 1971: Sofía Módica
- 1972: Sofía Módica
- 1973: Patricia Weber
- 1974: Ramona Brizuela
- 1975: Patricia Weber
- 1976: Ramona Brizuela
- 1977: Patricia Weber
- 1978: Patricia Weber
- 1979: Alejandra Bevacqua
- 1980: Alejandra Bevacqua
- 1981: Alejandra Bevacqua
- 1982: Susana Diez
- 1983: Alejandra González
- 1984: Diana Dutczyn
- 1985: Berenice da Silva (URU)
- 1986: Berenice da Silva (URU)
- 1987: Berenice da Silva (URU)
- 1988: Berenice da Silva (URU)
- 1989: Ana María Comaschi
- 1990: Silvana Filippi
- 1991: Berenice da Silva (URU)
- 1992: Silvana Filippi
- 1993: Silvana Filippi
- 1994: Ana Carolina Vera
- 1995: Simone Pereira Gonçalves BRA
- 1996: Simone Pereira Gonçalves BRA
- 1997: Simone Pereira Gonçalves BRA
- 1998: Simone Pereira Gonçalves BRA
- 1999: Simone Pereira Gonçalves BRA
- 2000: Simone Pereira Gonçalves BRA
- 2001: Paola Cheppi
- 2002: Natalia Ortiz
- 2003: Paola Cheppi
- 2004: Paola Cheppi
- 2005: Rocío Comba
- 2006: Rocío Comba

=== Discus throw ===
- 1960F: Ingeborg Pfüller
- 1960C: Dora López
- 1961: Ingeborg Pfüller
- 1962: Ingeborg Pfüller
- 1963: Ingeborg Pfüller
- 1964: Inés Nieto
- 1965: María Amaizón
- 1966: Inés Nieto
- 1967: Inés Nieto
- 1968: Gladys Ortega
- 1969: Gladys Ortega
- 1970: Gladys Ortega
- 1971: Gladys Ortega
- 1972: Clara Suárez
- 1973: Mirtha Salas
- 1974: Gladys Ortega
- 1975: Gladys Ortega
- 1976: María Rescia
- 1977: Gladys Ortega
- 1978: not contested
- 1979: Ana Adorno
- 1980: Alejandra Bevacqua
- 1981: Elizabeth Martínez
- 1982: Susana Diez
- 1983: Elizabeth Martínez
- 1984: Elizabeth Martínez
- 1985: Daphne Birnios
- 1986: Liliana Olguín
- 1987: Liliana Olguín
- 1988: Daphne Birnios
- 1989: Liliana Martinelli
- 1990: Liliana Martinelli
- 1991: Silvana Filippi
- 1992: Liliana Martinelli
- 1993: Liliana Martinelli
- 1994: Liliana Martinelli
- 1995: Liliana Martinelli
- 1996: Liliana Martinelli
- 1997: Liliana Martinelli
- 1998: María Eugenia Giggi
- 1999: Liliana Martinelli
- 2000: María Eugenia Giggi
- 2001: María Eugenia Giggi
- 2002: Natalia Ortiz
- 2003: Natalia Ortiz
- 2004: Claudia Ullmann
- 2005: Rocío Comba
- 2006: Rocío Comba

=== Hammer throw ===
- 1990: Zulma Lambert
- 1991: Zulma Lambert
- 1992: Zulma Lambert
- 1993: Zulma Lambert
- 1994: Zulma Lambert
- 1995: Karina Moya
- 1996: Karina Moya
- 1997: Karina Moya
- 1998: Karina Moya
- 1999: Karina Moya
- 2000: Karina Moya
- 2001: Karina Moya
- 2002: Zulma Lambert
- 2003: Karina Moya
- 2004: Karina Moya
- 2005: Karina Moya
- 2006: Karina Moya

=== Javelin throw ===
- 1960F: Magdalena García
- 1960C: Patricia Arepia
- 1961: Magdalena García
- 1962: Magdalena García
- 1963: Patricia Arepia
- 1964: Vilma Totaro
- 1965: Vilma Totaro
- 1966: Marta Occhi
- 1967: Magdalena García
- 1968: Vilma Totaro
- 1969: Ana María Campillay
- 1970: Ana María Campillay
- 1971: Ana Julieta Scursoni
- 1972: Ana María Campillay
- 1973: Ana María Campillay
- 1974: María Gauna
- 1975: Susana Sánchez
- 1976: Ana María Campillay
- 1977: Ana María Campillay
- 1978: Ana María Campillay
- 1979: Ana María Campillay
- 1980: Ana María Campillay
- 1981: Ana María Campillay
- 1982: Ana María Campillay
- 1983: Patricia Echague
- 1984: Ana María Campillay
- 1985: Sonia Favre
- 1986: Ana María Campillay
- 1987: Ana María Campillay
- 1988: Sonia Favre
- 1989: Sonia Favre
- 1990: Sonia Favre
- 1991: Sonia Favre
- 1992: Mariela Arch
- 1993: Mariela Arch
- 1994: Silvina Médici
- 1995: Silvina Médici
- 1996: Romina Maggi
- 1997: Romina Maggi
- 1998: Mariela Arch
- 1999: Romina Maggi
- 2000: Romina Maggi
- 2001: Romina Maggi
- 2002: Romina Maggi
- 2003: Romina Maggi
- 2004: Romina Maggi
- 2005: Romina Maggi
- 2006: Romina Maggi

=== Pentathlon ===
- 1972: Ana Clara Goldman
- 1973: Emilia Dyrzka
- 1974: Inés Jerabek
- 1975: Inés Jerabek
- 1976: Yvonne Neddermann
- 1977: Yvonne Neddermann
- 1978: Yvonne Neddermann
- 1979: Inés Jerabek
- 1980: Ana Urbano

=== Heptathlon ===
- 1981: Ana María Comaschi
- 1982: Ana María Comaschi
- 1983: Ana Destéfanis
- 1984: Ana Urbano
- 1985: Ana Destéfanis
- 1986: Possibly not held
- 1987: Ana María Comaschi
- 1988: Ana María Comaschi
- 1989: Ana María Comaschi
- 1990: Alejandra García
- 1991: Carolina Gutiérrez
- 1992: Mariela Andrade
- 1993: Mariela Andrade
- 1994: not contested
- 1995: Silvina Boretto
- 1996: Agustina López
- 1997: Verónica Domínguez
- 1998: María Fernanda Dilascio
- 1999: Andrea Bordalejo
- 2000: Ana Berg
- 2001: María Cecilia Marcobechio
- 2002: Anabella von Kesselstatt
- 2003: Daniela Crespo
- 2004: María Azzato
- 2005: Andrea Bordalejo
- 2006: Andrea Bordalejo

=== Cross country (long course) ===
- 1980: Olga Caccaviello
- 1981: Olga Caccaviello
- 1982: Olga Caccaviello
- 1983: Sonia Molina
- 1984: Sonia Molina
- 1985: Graciela Bargas
- 1986: Olga Caccaviello
- 1987: Norma Fernández
- 1988: Stella Maris Selles
- 1989: Griselda González
- 1990: Valeria Martínez
- 1991: Beatriz Coronel
- 1992: María Inés Rodríguez
- 1993: María Inés Rodríguez
- 1994: Elisa Cobañea
- 1995: María Inés Rodríguez
- 1996: Verónica Páez
- 1997: Lelys Salazar
- 1998: Lelys Salazar
- 1999: Verónica Ortega
- 2000: Verónica Páez
- 2001: Valeria Rodríguez
- 2002: Norma Garay
- 2003: Sandra Torres Álvarez
- 2004: Nadia Rodríguez
- 2005: Valeria Rodríguez

=== Cross country (short course) ===
- 1999: Nélida Vivas
- 2000: Claudia Camargo
- 2001: María Peralta
- 2002: Karina Córdoba
- 2003: María Peralta
- 2004: Sandra Amarillo
- 2005: María Peralta
