= Buenos Aires Marathon =

Road running event in Argentina

- Date: October
- Location: Buenos Aires, Argentina
- Event type: Road
- Distance: Marathon
- Established: 1984
- Organizer: Asociación Ñandú
- Course records: Men's: 2:05:00 (2019) (Kenya) Evans Chebet; Women's: 2:23:36 (2026) (Kenya) Rebecca Kangogo Chesir
- Website: Buenos Aires Marathon
- Participants: 2,849 finishers (2021); 8,579 (2019)

The Maratón de Buenos Aires is an annual marathon foot-race which takes place in Buenos Aires, Argentina, during the Southern Hemisphere's Spring, usually in October.

The 21st edition of the Buenos Aires Marathon started on October 9, 2005 at 7:30 at the 9 de Julio Avenue and Córdoba Avenue in the Recoleta neighbourhood, being the start also the ending point after the 42.195 kilometres (26 miles and 385 yards) of the classic race.

The course visited many important spots of the city, featuring Callao Avenue, the River Plate Stadium, Libertador Avenue, Palermo neighbourhood, Corrientes Avenue, passing by the famous Gardel's neighbourhood, then down to La Boca's Caminito, to return passing by Puerto Madero, Casa Rosada, and the city centre.

The 2005 edition had almost 3000 participants from Argentina and all over the world. Most of the foreign runners where from Peru, Ecuador and Chile, but there were also from other American and European countries. More than 6000 competitors completed the complete marathon distance at the 2009 edition, out of a field of over 12,000 runners.

The 2020 edition of the race was postponed to 2021 due to the coronavirus pandemic.

== Winners ==
Key: Course record

Edition	Date	Men's winner	Time	Women's winner	Time
41th	September 20, 2026	Bethwel Kibet Chumba (KEN)	2:08:28	Rebecca Kangogo Chesir (KEN)	2:23:36
40th	September 21, 2025	Habtamu Birlew Denekew (ETH)	2:09:46	Elfinest Demise Amare (ETH)	2:28:12
39th	September 22, 2024	Bethwel Yegon (KEN)	2:09:04	Yenenesh Tilahun (ETH)	2:27:15
38th	September 24, 2023	Cornelius Kibet (KEN)	2:08:29	Rodah Tanui (KEN)	2:24:52
37th	September 18, 2022	Victor Kipchirchir (KEN)	2:07:03	Rodah Tanui (KEN)	2:24:52
36th	October 10, 2021	Héctor Garibay (BOL)	2:11:58	Florencia Borelli (ARG)	2:32:27
35th	September 22, 2019	Evans Chebet (KEN)	2:05:00	Rodah Tanui (KEN)	2:25:46
34th	September 23, 2018	Emmanuel Saina (KEN)	2:05:21	Vivian Jerono (KEN)	2:30:16
33rd	October 15, 2017	Barnabas Kiptum (KEN)	2:09:46	Amelework Fekadu (ETH)	2:35:26
32nd	October 9, 2016	Siraj Gena (ETH)	2:20:24	Lishan Dula (BHR)	2:39:14
31st	October 11, 2015	Jonathan Chesoo (KEN)	2:12:24	Abeba Gebrene (ETH)	2:30:33
30th	October 12, 2014	Mariano Mastromarino (ARG)	2:15:28	Lucy Karimi (KEN)	2:38:52
29th	October 13, 2013	Julius Karinga (KEN)	2:11:02	Lucy Karimi (KEN)	2:34:32
28th	October 7, 2012	Eric Nzioki (KEN)	2:12:05	Lucy Karimi (KEN)	2:41:38
27th	October 9, 2011	Simon Kariuki (KEN)	2:10:24	Andrea Graciano (ARG)	2:46:34
26th	October 10, 2010	Claudir Rodrigues (BRA)	2:17:31	Rosalba Chacha (ECU)	2:37:16
25th	October 11, 2009	Mohamed Msandeki (TAN)	2:13:55	Sirlene de Pinho (BRA)	2:38:08
24th	October 12, 2008	Abdelhakim Fahli (MAR)	2:22.01	Sandra Torres (ARG)	2:48.04
23rd	November 4, 2007	Juan Carlos Cardona (COL)	2:16.06	Sirlene de Pinho (BRA)	2:39.07
22nd	October 29, 2006	Geovanni de Jesus (BRA)	2:18:27	Sandra Torres (ARG)	2:49:04
21st	October 9, 2005	Geovanni de Jesus (BRA)	2:15:53	Roxana Preussler (ARG)	2:49:49
20th	October 10, 2004	Oscar Cortínez (ARG)	2:21:22	Verónica Páez (ARG)	2:55:04
19th	November 2, 2003	Oscar Cortínez (ARG)	2:17:50	Verónica Páez (ARG)	2:52:04
—	2002	not held			
18th	September 30, 2001	Paul Rotich (KEN)	2:25:08	Sandra Torres (ARG)	2:51:11
17th	December 10, 2000	Néstor García (URU)	2:20:14	Claudia Camargo (ARG)	2:51:52
16th	October 3, 1999	Luis Carlos Ramos (BRA)	2:15:18	Sandra Torres (ARG)	2:47:36
15th	October 4, 1998	Luis Carlos Ramos (BRA)	2:20:39	Nercy da Freitas (BRA)	2:49:41
14th	September 28, 1997	José Castillo (PER)	2:18:35	Griselda González (ARG)	2:37:04
13th	November 24, 1996	Juan Pablo Juárez (ARG)	2:17:33	Nercy da Freitas (BRA)	2:45:43
12th	September 24, 1995	William Musyoki (KEN)	2:16:59	Érika Olivera (CHI)	2:45:02
11th	September 25, 1994	Clair Wathier (BRA)	2:14:02	Euseli de Assis (BRA)	2:47:57
10th	October 10, 1993	Toribio Gutiérrez (ARG)	2:19:56	Arlete Soares (BRA)	2:44:58
9th	October 11, 1992	António Costa (POR)	2:18:31	Nelida Olivet (ARG)	2:44:31
8th	October 13, 1991	Toribio Gutiérrez (ARG)	2:16:25	Ana María Nielsen (ARG)	2:42:44
7th	October 7, 1990	Enio de Vargas (BRA)	2:17:36	Elsa Calderón (CHI)	2:44:09
6th	September 17, 1989	Juan Pablo Juárez (ARG)	2:16:03	Ana María Nielsen (ARG)	2:43:58
5th	October 2, 1988	Valmir de Carvalho (BRA)	2:16:55	Griselda González (ARG)	2:42:48
4th	July 5, 1987	Jorge Yeber (ARG)	2:18:28	Nercy da Freitas (BRA)	2:55:02
3rd	October 12, 1986	Raimundo Manquel (ARG)	2:21:10	Angélica de Almeida (BRA)	2:54:47
2nd	November 17, 1985	Rubén Huerga (ARG)	2:25:20	Derlis María Fraschina (ARG)	3:59:47
1st	September 29, 1984	Rubén Aguiar (ARG)	2:21:27	not held	

== See also ==
- 21K Buenos Aires
- Mar del Plata Marathon
