= Athletics at the 1978 Southern Cross Games =

Athletics at the I Southern Cross Games
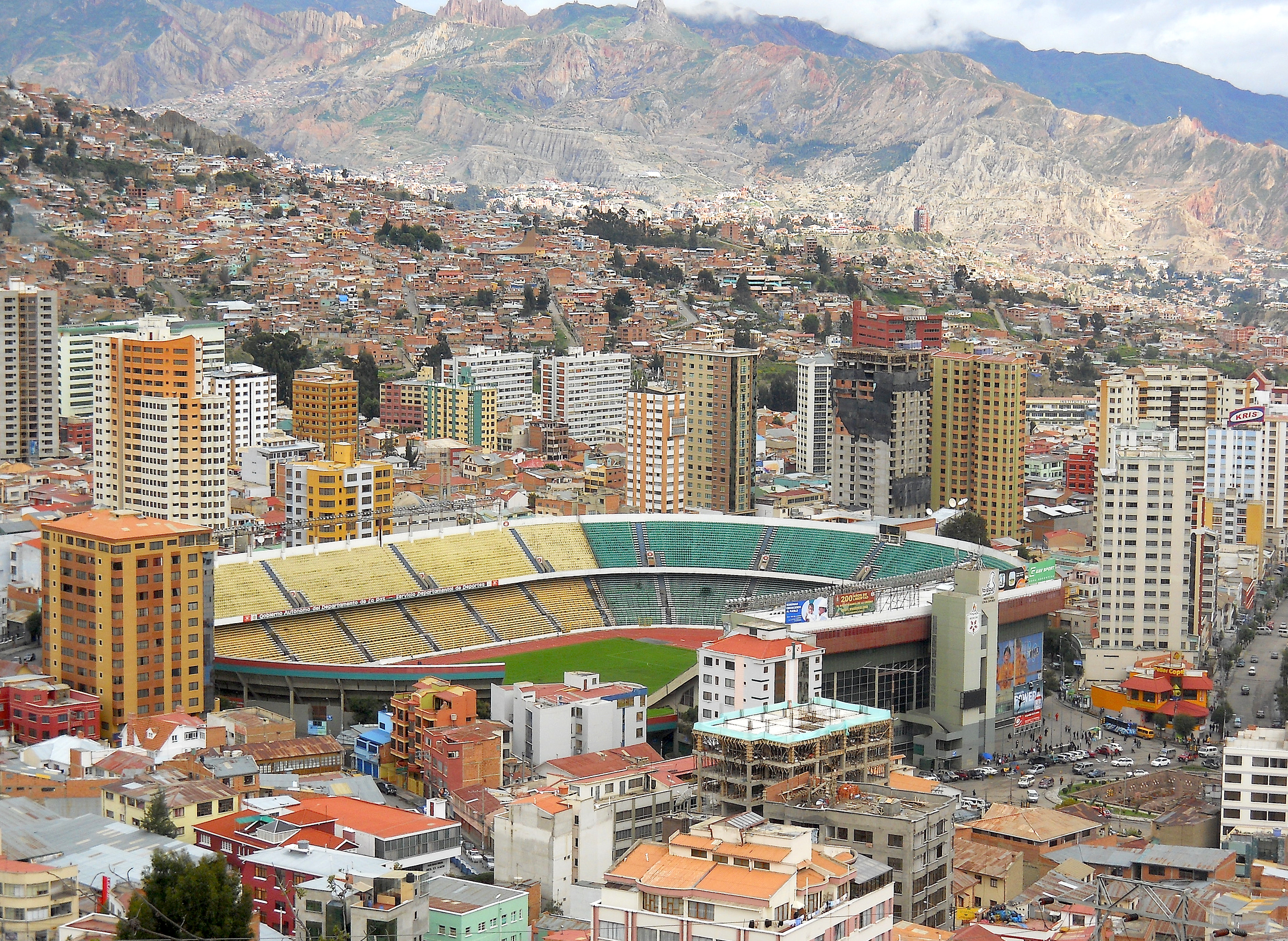
- Hernando Siles Stadium, the national stadium of Bolivia located in the Miraflores borough of La Paz
- Dates: November
- Host city: La Paz, Bolivia
- Venue: Estadio Olímpico Hernando Siles
- Level: Senior
- Events: 35 (22 men, 13 women)
- Participation: 7 nations

Athletics events at the 1978 Southern Cross Games were held at the Estadio Olímpico Hernando Siles in La Paz, Bolivia in November. The stadium was one of the first in South America equipped with a synthetic track. A total of 35 events were contested, 22 by men and 13 by women.

Best performances were by Luis Schneider from Chile winning four gold medals (100m, 200m, 4 × 100 m relay, 4 × 400 m relay), by native Jhonny Pérez from Bolivia winning three gold medals (1500 m, 5000 m, and 3000 m steeplechase), by Ivonne Neddermann from Argentina winning two gold (long jump, 4 × 100 m relay), two silver (100 m hurdles, pentathlon) and one bronze medal (shot put), and finally by Nancy Vallecilla from Ecuador winning two gold (100 m hurdles, pentathlon), one silver (400 m), and one bronze medal (long jump). She was awarded the unofficial title of "Queen of the Games" (Spanish: Reina de los Juegos).

== Medal summary ==
Medal winners were published in a book written by Argentinian journalist Ernesto Rodríguez III with support of the Argentine Olympic Committee (Spanish: Comité Olímpico Argentino) under the auspices of the Ministry of Education (Spanish: Ministerio de Educación de la Nación) in collaboration with the Office of Sports (Spanish: Secretaría de Deporte de la Nación). Eduardo Biscayart supplied the list of winners and their results. All results are marked as "affected by altitude" (A), because the stadium in La Paz is situated 3,650 metres above sea level.

=== Men ===
Event	Gold		Silver		Bronze	
100 metres	Luis Schneider; Chile	10.70 A	José Luis Elías; Peru	10.77 A	Gustavo Dubarbier; Argentina	10.78 A
200 metres	Luis Schneider; Chile	21.4 A	Ricardo Donda; Argentina	21.5 A	José Luis Elías; Peru	21.6 A
400 metres	Patricio Valenzuela; Chile	48.31 A	Felipe Mascaró; Chile	49.08 A	Roberto Prado; Bolivia	49.12 A
800 metres	Omar Amdematten; Argentina	1:56.68 A	Álvaro Cortez; Argentina	1:57.22 A	Felipe Mascaró; Chile	1:57.51 A
1500 metres	Jhonny Pérez; Bolivia	4:11.56 A	Pedro Foronda; Bolivia	4:12.72 A	Abel Godoy; Uruguay	4:14.09 A
5000 metres	Jhonny Pérez; Bolivia	15:54.33 A	Luis Tipán; Ecuador	15:56.54 A	Lucio Guachalla; Bolivia	16:18.14 A
10,000 metres	Luis Tipán; Ecuador	33:28.14 A	Lucio Guachalla; Bolivia	34:11.62 A	Rufino Chávez; Bolivia	34:30.27 A
110 m hurdles	Alfredo Piza; Chile	14.64 A	Rodolfo Iturraspe; Argentina	15.04 A	Francisco Fuentes; Chile	15.42 A
400 m hurdles	Alfredo Piza; Chile	53.26 A	Rodolfo Iturraspe; Argentina	54.53 A	Guillermo Gago; Argentina	56.08 A
3000 m steeplechase	Jhonny Pérez; Bolivia	9:53.08 A	Luis Tipán; Ecuador	10:07.39 A	Norberto Limonta; Argentina	10:34.24 A
4 × 100 metres relay	Chile; Patricio Valenzuela; Luis Alberto Schneider; Francisco Pichott; Alejandro Kapsch	40.35 A	Jorge Ullanque; José Torrico; Roberto Prado; Ernesto Roca; Bolivia	40.91 A	Daniel Díaz Antuña; Ricardo Donda; Angel Gagliano; Eduardo Labalta; Argentina	41.05 A
4 × 400 metres relay	Chile; Patricio Valenzuela; Luis Schneider; Alfredo Piza; Felipe Mascaró	3:18.48 A	Daniel Díaz Antuña; Guillermo Gago; Angel Gagliano; Rodolfo Iturraspe; Argentina	3:18.73 A	Roberto Prado; Edgar Aguayo; Freddy Bustamante; Freddy Torrico; Bolivia	3:18.78 A
20 kilometres walk	Oswaldo Morejón; Bolivia	1:56:13 A	Esteban Quelale; Bolivia	1:56.49 A	Víctor Sánchez; Paraguay	2:08.05 A
High jump	Daniel Mamet; Argentina	2.18 A	Luis Arbulú; Peru	2.05 A	Víctor Migliaro; Chile	2.00 A
Pole vault	Roberto Steinmetz; Argentina	4.60 A	Alejandro Jadresic; Chile	4.20 A	Andrés Vicuña; Chile	4.00 A
Long jump	Francisco Pichot; Chile	7.47 A	Alex Kapch; Chile	7.46 A	Ronald Raborg; Peru	7.25 A
Triple jump	Francisco Pichot; Chile	16.27 A	Angel Gagliano; Argentina	15.66 A	Óscar Aguirre; Bolivia	13.47 A
Shot put	José Alberto Vallejo; Argentina	14.46 A	Héctor Rivero; Argentina	14.11 A	Miro Ronac; Peru	11.63 A
Discus throw	Héctor Rivero; Argentina	47.10 A	José Alberto Vallejo; Argentina	46.76 A	Eduardo Vieira; Chile	43.68 A
Hammer throw	José Alberto Vallejo; Argentina	63.90 A	Daniel Gómez; Argentina	62.38 A	Miro Ronac; Peru	33.26 A
Javelin throw	Angel Garmendia; Argentina	70.70 A	Miro Ronac; Peru	60.04 A		
Decathlon	Roberto Steinmetz; Argentina	6624 A	Alfredo Silva; Chile	6597 A		

=== Women ===
Event	Gold		Silver		Bronze	
100 metres	Beatriz Allocco; Argentina	11.73 A	Carmela Bolívar; Peru	11.83 A	Isabel Alemán; Bolivia	12.06 A
200 metres	Beatriz Allocco; Argentina	22.94 A	Carmela Bolívar; Peru	23.55 A	Isabel Alemán; Bolivia	24.57 A
400 metres	Alejandra Ramos; Chile	56.68 A	Nancy Vallecilla; Ecuador	59.05 A	Blanca Ibáñez; Bolivia	59.17 A
800 metres	Ana María Nielsen; Argentina	2:15.85 A	Mery Rojas; Bolivia	2:19.03 A	Laura Méndez; Ecuador	2:20.73 A
1500 metres	Ana María Nielsen; Argentina	4:57.12 A	Laura Méndez; Ecuador	5:08.58 A	Trinidad Guerra; Chile	5:11.7 A
100 m hurdles	Nancy Vallecilla; Ecuador	13.80 A	Ivonne Neddermann; Argentina	14.34 A	Emilia Dyrzka; Argentina	14.74 A
4 × 100 metres relay	Argentina; Ivonne Neddermann; Emilia Dyrzka; Araceli Bruschini; Beatriz Allocco	46.06 A	Bolivia; CarIa Guissini; Blanca Ibáñez; Martha Novillo; Isabel Alemán	46.94 A		
High jump	Elizabeth Huber; Chile	1.75 A	Laura Ragas; Argentina	1.65 A	Ximena Mesa; Chile	1.65 A
Long jump	Ivonne Neddermann; Argentina	6.05 A	Ximena Mesa; Chile	5.97 A	Nancy Vallecilla; Ecuador	5.90 A
Shot put	Patricia Weber; Argentina	12.91 A	Lorena Prado; Chile	12.49 A	Ivonne Neddermann; Argentina	12.10 A
Discus throw	Lucy Ascune; Uruguay	39.72 A	Lorena Prado; Chile	38.12 A	Elizabeth Garnica; Bolivia	31.02 A
Javelin throw	Ana María Campillay; Argentina	46.72 A	Elizabeth Guernica; Bolivia	36.78 A	Elizabeth Huber; Chile	31.18 A
Pentathlon	Nancy Vallecilla; Ecuador	3798 A	Ivonne Neddermann; Argentina	3625 A	Ariana Salas; Chile	3103 A

== Medal table (unofficial) ==
* Host nation (Bolivia)

Rank	Nation	Gold	Silver	Bronze	Total
1	Argentina (ARG)	16	12	6	34
2	Chile (CHI)	11	7	9	27
3	Bolivia (BOL)*	4	7	9	20
4	Ecuador (ECU)	3	4	2	9
5	Uruguay (URU)	1	0	1	2
6	Peru (PER)	0	5	4	9
7	Paraguay (PAR)	0	0	1	1
Totals (7 entries)		35	35	32	102
