= 21K Buenos Aires =

Annual Argentine marathon

- Date: September
- Location: Buenos Aires, Argentina
- Event type: Road
- Distance: Half marathon
- Established: 1989
- Organizer: Asociación Ñandú
- Course records: Men's: 56:51 WR (2026) (Ethiopia) Yomif Kejelcha; Women's: 1:03:57 (2026) (Ethiopia) Fotyen Tesfay
- Website: Official website
- Participants: 7,413 finishers (2021)

The Buenos Aires Half Marathon (official name: 21k Buenos Aires), is an annual road running competition over the half marathon distance 21.0975 kilometres (13.1094 mi) which takes place in Buenos Aires, Argentina in September. The route starts and ends in City Park and winds through the city center.

The 2011 edition of the race hosted the South American Marathon Championships. The race has also hosted the national championships for Argentina, four times for men (1997, 2001, 2015, 2017) and four times for women (1997, 1999, 2001, 2015). The course records are held by the Ethiopians Yomif Kejelcha (56:51), a world record when set, and Fotyen Tesfay (1:03:57).

== Past winners ==
Key: Course record

Year	Men's winner	Time (h:m:s)	Women's winner	Time (h:m:s)
1989	Ricardo Castro (ARG)	1:04:22	Ana María Nielsen (ARG)	1:17:38
1990	Leonardo Malgor (ARG)	1:06:10	Adriana Calvo (ARG)	1:20:23
1991	Juan Pablo Juárez (ARG)	1:03:49	Ana María Nielsen (ARG)	1:17:29
1992	Leonardo Malgor (ARG)	1:04:11	Elisa Cobañea (ARG)	1:15:14
1993	Juan Pablo Juárez (ARG)	1:03:15	Silvana Pereira (BRA)	1:13:39
1994	Ronaldo da Costa (BRA)	1:01:05	Solange de Souza (BRA)	1:12:21
1995	André Luiz Ramos (BRA)	1:02:03	Elisa Cobañea (ARG)	1:14:30
1996	Emerson Iser-Bem (BRA)	1:03:26	Elisa Cobañea (ARG)	1:14:35
1997	Luiz Carlos da Silva (BRA)	1:04:03	Maria das Gracas (BRA)	1:16:30
1998	Luis Santos Ramos (BRA)	1:05:01	Lelys Salazar (ARG)	1:18:12
1999	Rómulo W. da Silva (BRA)	1:06:01	Mónica Cervera (ARG)	1:17:39
2000	Patrick Boiyo (KEN)	1:04:57	Cleusa M. Irineu (BRA)	1:17:14
2001	Angus Cheptot (KEN)	1:04:42	Ramilya Burangulova (RUS)	1:12:59
2002	Oscar Cortínez (ARG)	1:05:40	Érika Olivera (CHI)	1:14:51
2003	José Luis Luna (ARG)	1:06:46	Elisa Cobañea (ARG)	1:17:10
2004	Oscar Cortínez (ARG)	1:05:09	Elisabete Ferreira Cruz (BRA)	1:19:17
2005	Oscar Cortínez (ARG)	1:05:30	Sandra Torres (ARG)	1:15:45
2006	Oscar Cortínez (ARG)	1:05:57	Carina Allay (ARG)	1:19:05
2007	Adriano Bastos (BRA)	1:06:07	Sandra Torres (ARG)	1:19:52
2008	Adriano Bastos (BRA)	1:05:48	Rosa Godoy (ARG)	1:16:08
2009	Sergio Hoffman (ARG)	1:10:35	Sandra Córdoba (ARG)	1:17:54
2010	Jorge Luis Mérida (ARG)	1:04:48	Rosa Godoy (ARG)	1:15:16
2011	Marílson Gomes (BRA)	1:01:13	Adriana da Silva (BRA)	1:13:16
2012	Elijah Keitany (KEN)	1:02:30	Shewarge Amare (ETH)	1:13:46
2013	Kiplimo Kimutai (KEN)	1:02:57	Alice Chelangat (KEN)	1:13:20
2014	Matías Roht (ARG)	1:03:48	Sandra Amarillo (ARG)	1:16:51
2015	Matías Roht (ARG)	1:04:12	Rosa Godoy (ARG)	1:15:30
2016	Diego Elizondo (ARG)	1:04:39	Florencia Borelli (ARG)	1:14:19
2017	Paul Lonyangata (KEN)	1:01:28	Florencia Borelli (ARG)	1:11:58
2018	Mosinet Geremew (ETH)	59:48	Vivian Jeronoi (KEN)	1:09:08
2019	Bedan Karoki (KEN)	59:05	Ababel Yeshaneh (ETH)	1:07:44
2021	Fabián Manrique (ARG)	1:04:42	Agustina Landers (ARG)	1:17:22
2022	Gerba Dibaba (ETH)	1:00:29	Irine Kimais (KEN)	1:07:59
2023	Roncer Konga (KEN)	59:08	Ababel Yeshaneh (ETH)	1:06:10
2024	Gerba Dibaba (ETH)	1:00:24	Ruth Chepng'etich (KEN)	1:05:58
2025	Jacob Kiplimo (UGA)	58:29	Veronica Loleo (KEN)	1:06:58
2026	Yomif Kejelcha (ETH)	56:51	Fotyen Tesfay (ETH)	1:03:57
