= Allay =

Allay may refer to:

- Allay, a village in Nichula Gewog, Dagana District, Bhutan
- Allay, a torpedo boat of Peru in the naval campaign of the War of the Pacific
- "Allay", a song from the 2020 Katie Gately album Loom

== People ==
- Carina Allay, Argentine runner, two-time Argentine Athletics Championships half marathon winner
- Prashant Allay, Indian competitor in sport climbing at the 2007 Asian Indoor Games

== See also ==
- Alay Valley, a valley in Kyrgyzstan
- "Allay Allay", a song from the soundtrack of the 2001 Hindi film One 2 Ka 4
