= Athletics at the 1975 Pan American Games – Women's 800 metres =

Women's 800 metres at the Pan American Games

The women's 800 metres event at the 1975 Pan American Games was held in Mexico City on 14 and 15 October.

== Medalists ==
Gold	Silver	Bronze
Kathy Weston; United States	Abby Hoffman; Canada	Kathie Hall; United States

== Results ==
=== Heats ===
Rank	Heat	Name	Nationality	Time	Notes
1	1	Kathie Hall	United States	2:09.71	Q
2	2	Abby Hoffman	Canada	2:10.32	Q
3	2	Kathy Weston	United States	2:10.39	Q
4	1	Rosângela Verissimo	Brazil	2:11.27	Q
5	1	Ana María Nielsen	Argentina	2:13.50	q
6	2	Araceli Arana	Mexico	2:13.90	q
7	2	Alejandra Ramos	Chile	2:15.39	
~~8~~	3	Joan Wenzel	Canada	~~2:15.48~~	Doping
8	2	Thelma Zúñiga	Costa Rica	2:16.82	
9	3	Mercedes Álvarez	Cuba	2:17.26	Q
10	3	Iris Fernández	Argentina	2:18.68	
	1	Patricia Selmo	Dominican Republic	DQ	

=== Final ===
Rank	Name	Nationality	Time	Notes
1st place, gold medalist(s)	Kathy Weston	United States	2:04.93	
2nd place, silver medalist(s)	Abby Hoffman	Canada	2:05.25	
~~3~~	Joan Wenzel	Canada	~~2:06.93~~	Doping
3rd place, bronze medalist(s)	Kathie Hall	United States	2:07.56	
4	Ana María Nielsen	Argentina	2:09.86	
5	Araceli Arana	Mexico	2:10.96	
6	Mercedes Álvarez	Cuba	2:15.41	
	Rosângela Verissimo	Brazil	DNS	
