= Geovanni de Jesus =

Brazilian long-distance runner

Geovanni de Jesus (born June 30, 1979) is a marathon runner from Brazil, who twice won the Buenos Aires Marathon in Argentina (2005 and 2006).

== Achievements ==
- All results regarding marathon, unless stated otherwise

Year	Competition	Venue	Position	Notes
Representing Brazil
2005	Buenos Aires Marathon	Buenos Aires, Argentina	1st	2:15:53
2006	Buenos Aires Marathon	Buenos Aires, Argentina	1st	2:18:27
