= 1991 Berlin Marathon =

18th Berlin Marathon
- Venue: Berlin, Germany
- Date: 29 September

Champions
- Men: Steve Brace (2:10:57)
- Women: Renata Kokowska (2:27:36)

The 1991 Berlin Marathon was the 18th running of the annual marathon race in Berlin, Germany, which was held on 29 September. Great Britain's Steve Brace won the men's race in 2:10:57 hours, while the women's race was won by Poland's Renata Kokowska in 2:27:36.

A total of 14,849 runners finished the race, 13,456 men and 1393 women.

== Results ==
=== Men ===
Position	Athlete	Nationality	Time
1st place, gold medalist(s)	Steve Brace	United Kingdom	2:10:57
2nd place, silver medalist(s)	Mark Plaatjes	South Africa	2:11:01
3rd place, bronze medalist(s)	Slawomir Gurny	Poland	2:11:45
4	Rustam Shagiev	Soviet Union	2:11:53
5	Wiesław Perszke	Poland	2:12:00
6	Ken Martin	United States	2:12:06
7	Andy Ronan	Ireland	2:12:43
8	Bert van Vlaanderen	Netherlands	2:12:47
9	Julius Sumawe	Tanzania	2:12:50
10	Leszek Bebło	Poland	2:13:13
11	Geoffrey Wightman	United Kingdom	2:13:17
12	Antoni Niemczak	Poland	2:13:44
13	Rodrigo Gavela	Spain	2:13:59
14	Dariusz Kaczmarski	Poland	2:14:15
15	Mats Erixon	Sweden	2:14:51
16	Takashi Murakami	Japan	2:15:11
17	Helmut Schmuck	Austria	2:15:22
18	Pawel Tarasiuk	Poland	2:15:23
19	Terje Ness	Norway	2:15:25
20	Dariusz Nawrocki	Poland	2:15:33
—	Suleiman Nyambui	Tanzania	DNF
—	Richard O'Flynn	Ireland	DNF

=== Women ===
Position	Athlete	Nationality	Time
1st place, gold medalist(s)	Renata Kokowska	Poland	2:27:36
2nd place, silver medalist(s)	Kim Jones	United States	2:27:50
3rd place, bronze medalist(s)	Tuija Toivonen	Finland	2:28:49
4	Yekaterina Khramenkova	Soviet Union	2:31:14
5	Janeth Mayal	Brazil	2:31:27
6	Lyubov Klochko	Soviet Union	2:31:44
7	Birgit Jerschabek	Germany	2:33:08
8	Birgit Bringslid	Sweden	2:34:49
9	Irina Petrova	Soviet Union	2:35:01
10	Christine Kennedy	Ireland	2:35:05
11	Sissel Grottenberg	Norway	2:35:38
12	Emma Scaunich	Italy	2:36:13
13	Tatyana Titova	Soviet Union	2:37:13
14	Petra Liebertz	Germany	2:37:31
15	Marianne Fløymo	Norway	2:38:17
16	Galina Kuragina	Soviet Union	2:38:58
17	Pascaline Wangui	Kenya	2:39:13
18	Jolanda Homminga	Netherlands	2:39:19
19	Ritva Lemettinen	Finland	2:39:32
20	Christine Van Put	Belgium	2:39:35
—	Lorraine Moller	New Zealand	DNF
