= Athletics at the 1975 Pan American Games – Men's shot put =

Men's shot put at the Pan American Games

The men's shot put event at the 1975 Pan American Games was held in Mexico City on 17 October.

== Results ==
Rank	Name	Nationality	#1	#2	#3	#4	#5	#6	Result	Notes
1st place, gold medalist(s)	Bruce Pirnie	Canada	18.68	18.42	18.50	18.44	18.30	19.28	19.28	
2nd place, silver medalist(s)	Bishop Dolegiewicz	Canada	x	x	18.56	19.14	19.18	18.92	19.18	
3rd place, bronze medalist(s)	Terry Albritton	United States	19.18	x	x	–	–	x	19.18	
4	Juan Turri	Argentina	x	16.44	16.46	18.30	x	18.12	18.30	
5	José Carlos Jacques	Brazil							16.72	
6	José Luiz Carabolante	Brazil							16.72	
7	Julián Mejías	Cuba							16.68	
8	Pedro Serrano	Puerto Rico							15.72	
9	Tito Steiner	Argentina							15.18	
10	Eracelio Carrillo	Mexico							14.96	
	Jesse Stuart	United States	x	x	x				NM	
