= Ana Buenaventura Mocoroa =

Argentine physicist

- Died: 8 February 2001
- Education: National University of La Plata
- Occupation: Physicist
- Spouse: Marco Antonio Poggio

Ana Buenaventura Mocoroa (died 8 February 2001), also known as Titina Mocoroa, was an Argentine physicist. She is known for her contributions in experimental physics and her dedication to improving the teaching of her discipline.

== Biography ==
Ana Buenaventura Mocoroa graduated with a licentiate in Physics in 1955 and later, in 1966, she obtained the degree of Doctor in Physics, both at the National University of La Plata (UNLP). She was among the first women in Argentina to obtain the latter title.

She served as a physics teacher in various faculties of UNLP and other institutions. She was a teacher at the Faculty of Exact Science, occupied the Physics I and Physics II chairs between 1979 and 1981, and Physics III in 1984. Together with her husband Marco Antonio Poggio (1917–1996), she taught at the UNLP Faculty of Medicine and the Escuela Naval Militar, and they co-wrote a general physics manual. She also taught modern physics.

At the Faculty of Humanities and Education Sciences, she was appointed a member of the Interfaculties Commission as a representative of the Faculty of Exact Sciences, with the aim of restructuring teacher study plans. The group was led by Dr. Lía Zervino, Nieves Baade, and engineer María Isabel Cotignola. Together they made numerous presentations to physics teaching congresses and meetings, where they discussed both classroom innovations and new content organization proposals. Together with her team, in 1997 she presented a curricular proposal for physics teaching in engineering programs.

She was director of the doctoral thesis of La Plata physicist Roberto Mercader.

== Recognition ==
The National Technological University – La Plata Regional Faculty (UTN-FRLP) considered Titina Mocoroa a valuable teacher. In 1995, she was appointed consultant professor for a 3-year term. In 1998, UTN-FRLP named its new library "Biblioteca Prof. Dra. Ana B. Mocoroa" in her honor.

Titina Mocoroa was recognized for her qualities as a teacher, particularly clarity and dynamism. Physicist Moisés Silbert remembers her as a great motivator:

The first two years of the Licentiate were mostly shared with Engineering students, and the goal was to survive. As of the third year, I began to take specific subjects of the major, and my degree of motivation and commitment increased significantly. It was then that a young teacher, Ana (Titina) Mocoroa, now deceased, had a great influence in helping me discipline my studies. In large measure I owe it to her to have graduated.

The astronomer Zulema González credits Titina Mocoroa for the support to find her true vocation:

Titina Mocoroa, Exactas professor, told me to come to work at the Observatory with Carlos Jaschek. At first I had to take some subjects in astronomy. I always felt like an astronomer.

Argentine physicist Adriana Calvo de Laborde mentioned Ana Mocoroa in her testimony at the Trial of the Juntas in 1985, referring to having asked for help in reference to Inés Ortega and her son born in captivity, who were disappeared under the civil–military dictatorship.

Inés did not come back with us; neither Inés nor her baby ever appeared again. She named him Leonardo and he was born on 12 March 1977, and he was in perfect condition and I, after I left, went to college. Through Dr. Mocoroa, a professor at the faculty, I sent this news to the family – I let them know that they had had a grandson named Leonardo.
