= 1991 Boston Marathon =

Footrace in Boston, Massachusetts, USA

- Venue: Boston, United States
- Dates: April 15

Champions
- Men: Ibrahim Hussein (2:11:06)
- Women: Wanda Panfil (2:24:18)

The 1991 Boston Marathon was the 95th running of the annual marathon race in Boston, United States, which was held on April 15. The elite men's race was won by Kenya's Ibrahim Hussein in a time of 2:11:06 hours and the women's race was won by Poland's Wanda Panfil in 2:24:18.

A total of 7642 runners finished the race, 6291 men and 1351 women.

== Results ==
=== Men ===
Position	Athlete	Nationality	Time
1st place, gold medalist(s)	Ibrahim Hussein	Kenya	2:11:06
2nd place, silver medalist(s)	Abebe Mekonnen	Ethiopia	2:11:22
3rd place, bronze medalist(s)	Andy Ronan	Ireland	2:11:27
4	Alejandro Cruz	Mexico	2:12:11
5	Carlos Grisales	Colombia	2:12:33
6	Douglas Wakiihuri	Kenya	2:13:30
7	Tesfaye Tafa	Ethiopia	2:14:07
8	Atsushi Sakauchi	Japan	2:14:18
9	Lemi Chengere	Ethiopia	2:14:28
10	Andrzej Witczak	Poland	2:14:49
11	Jean-Michel Charbonnel	France	2:15:22
12	Paul Zimmerman	United States	2:15:32
13	Rolando Vera	Ecuador	2:15:46
14	Juan Pablo Juarez	Argentina	2:15:55
15	Ed Eyestone	United States	2:15:58
16	Ieuan Ellis	United Kingdom	2:16:20
17	Jouni Kortelainen	Finland	2:17:55
18	Geoffrey Smith	United Kingdom	2:18:00
19	Pekka Roto	Finland	2:18:04
20	Thomas Robert Naali	Tanzania	2:18:10
21	Kenneth Judson	United States	2:18:11
22	Manabu Kawagoe	Japan	2:18:22
23	Mark Amway	United States	2:18:26
24	Simon Robert Naali	Tanzania	2:19:19
25	Takuya Ota	Japan	2:19:46

=== Women ===
Position	Athlete	Nationality	Time
1st place, gold medalist(s)	Wanda Panfil	Poland	2:24:18
2nd place, silver medalist(s)	Kim Jones	United States	2:26:40
3rd place, bronze medalist(s)	Uta Pippig	Germany	2:26:52
4	Joan Benoit	United States	2:26:54
5	Kamila Gradus	Poland	2:26:55
6	Ingrid Kristiansen	Norway	2:29:24
7	Conceição Ferreira	Portugal	2:30:18
8	Małgorzata Birbach	Poland	2:32:13
9	Odette Lapierre	Canada	2:32:55
10	Manuela Machado	Portugal	2:33:08
11	Regina Joyce	Ireland	2:35:35
12	Christine McNamara	United States	2:36:21
13	Graziella Striuli	Italy	2:37:01
14	Kirsi Rauta	Finland	2:37:35
15	Ritva Lemettinen	Finland	2:38:19
16	Gillian Horovitz	United Kingdom	2:40:46
17	Laurie Binder	United States	2:43:25
18	Judith Hine	New Zealand	2:44:25
19	Elizabeth Bullen	Ireland	2:44:31
20	Julie Moss	United States	2:47:19
21	Shirley Silsby	United States	2:47:25
22	Ana Maria Nielsen	Argentina	2:47:45
23	Christine Iwahashi	United States	2:47:49
24	Lisa Senatore	United States	2:48:18
25	Mitsuko Kon	Japan	2:49:16
