= Mike Hazle =

American javelin thrower (born 1979)

Personal information
- Full name: Michael Gannon Hazle
- Nationality: United States
- Born: March 22, 1979 (age 47) Conroe, Texas, U.S.
- Home town: Chula Vista, California, U.S.
- Height: 6 ft 0 in (1.83 m)
- Weight: 201 lb (91 kg)

Sport
- Sport: Athletics
- Event: Javelin throw
- Coached by: Ty Sevin

Achievements and titles
- Personal best: Outdoor: 83.74 m (2008)
Medal record
Men's athletics
Representing the United States
Pan American Games
Silver medal – second place	2007 Rio de Janeiro	Javelin throw

Michael Gannon Hazle (born March 22, 1979) is a United States Olympian and National Champion (American javelin thrower.) Mike is also a former United States Air Force Special Operations Command (AFSOC) Combat Controller (CCT). He is a four-time silver medalist at the US outdoor championships (2007–2010), before he claimed his first National Championship in 2011. He also won a silver medal in his category at the 2007 Pan American Games in Rio de Janeiro, Brazil.

== Career ==
Hazle, a native of Conroe, Texas, started out his sporting career as a football and baseball enthusiast at Temple High School. He attended Texas State University in San Marcos, Texas, where he played both football and baseball for three years, before ending his career with a knee injury. He was convinced by his long-time friend and mentor Don Hood to try out for track and field. Hazle initially trained and competed for the decathlon, but he decided to narrow his focus to the javelin throw, which was considered his best event. He qualified for the 2002 NCAA and U.S. outdoor championships, where he achieved his personal bests of 67.56 and 70.66 metres, respectively. Hazle also owned a bachelor's degree in exercise sports science (2001), and a master's degree in sports and business administration (2003) from Texas State University.

Shortly after his graduation from the University, Hazle continued to compete at the US national championships, but did not attain better than the fifth position in the javelin throw. In 2007, he reached his breakthrough season with a runner-up finish at the AT&T US Outdoor Championships, posting a personal best throw of 75.06 metres. Hazle also qualified for the IAAF World Championships in Osaka, Japan, and eventually claimed a silver medal in men's javelin at the Pan American Games in Rio de Janeiro, Brazil, with a seasonal best throw of 75.33 metres.

In 2008, Hazle set a personal best of 82.21 metres by placing third at the Qatar Athletic Super Grand Prix in Doha, Qatar. He repeated his runner-up finish at the U.S. Outdoor National Championships, and also, at the U.S. Olympic Trials in Eugene, Oregon, with a throw of 75.76 metres, earning him a spot on the United States team for the Olympics.

At the 2008 Summer Olympics in Beijing, Hazle competed as a member of the U.S. track and field team in the men's javelin throw, along with his teammates Breaux Greer and Leigh Smith. He performed a best throw of 72.75 metres from his second attempt, but fell short in his bid for the twelve-man final, as he placed twenty-fifth in the qualifying rounds.

Hazle continued his runner-up streak at the 2009 and 2010 US Outdoor Track and Field Championships, until he claimed his first ever career title in 2011, with a best throw of 78.22 metres. He was expected to compete for the second time at the IAAF World Championships in Daegu, South Korea, and at the Pan American Games in Guadalajara, Mexico, but forced to withdraw from the competitions because of career ending right elbow injury.'

After retiring from professional athletics, Hazle enlisted in the United States Navy SEALs. In 2012 he was awarded a Navy SEAL officer billet for BUD/s for fiscal year 2013 but lost the billet after the United States budget sequestration in 2013. Hazle then enlisted as a US Air Force Special Operations Command Combat Controller.

Mike retired from the military in 2019.

== Major competition record ==
Year	Competition	Venue	Position	Event	Notes
Representing the United States
2008	Summer Olympics	Beijing, China	25	Javelin throw	72.75 m
2009	IAAF World Championships	Berlin, Germany	17	Javelin throw	78.17 m
2010	IAAF/VTB Bank Continental Cup	Split, Croatia	8	Javelin throw	73.18 m

- All information taken from IAAF profile.

== Seasonal bests by year ==
- 2003 – 69.25
- 2005 – 79.15
- 2006 – 77.09
- 2007 – 81.99
- 2008 – 83.74 (personal best)
- 2009 – 82.06
- 2010 – 80.05
- 2011 – 81.09
- 2012 – 76.16
