= Athletics at the 1987 Pan American Games – Men's pole vault =

Men's pole vault at the Pan American Games

The men's pole vault event at the 1987 Pan American Games was held in Indianapolis, United States on 15 August.

== Results ==
Rank	Name	Nationality	Result	Notes
1st place, gold medalist(s)	Mike Tully	United States	5.71	GR
2nd place, silver medalist(s)	Rubén Camino	Cuba	5.50	NR
3rd place, bronze medalist(s)	Scott Davis	United States	5.30	
4	Oscar Veit	Argentina	4.90	
5	Miguel Saldarriaga	Colombia	4.70	
6	Fernando Pastoriza	Argentina	4.60	
	Rob Ferguson	Canada	NM	
