= Athletics at the 2007 Pan American Games – Men's javelin throw =

Men's javelin throw at the Pan American Games

The men's javelin throw event at the 2007 Pan American Games was held on July 28.

== Results ==
Rank	Athlete	Nationality	#1	#2	#3	#4	#5	#6	Result	Notes
1st place, gold medalist(s)	Guillermo Martínez	Cuba	72.59	72.81	x	72.33	77.66	72.23	77.66	
2nd place, silver medalist(s)	Mike Hazle	United States	67.06	x	70.54	x	75.33	x	75.33	SB
3rd place, bronze medalist(s)	Alexon Maximiano	Brazil	71.18	70.12	75.04	71.29	x	x	75.04	
4	Víctor Fatecha	Paraguay	68.37	72.30	71.15	x	x	x	72.30	
5	Noraldo Palacios	Colombia	x	67.28	71.14	x	66.96	x	71.14	
6	Pablo Pietrobelli	Argentina	66.83	64.69	67.29	70.54	70.62	66.09	70.62	
7	Justin St. Clair	United States	68.48	67.54	67.28	64.96	67.73	67.13	68.48	
8	Júlio de Oliveira	Brazil	67.92	66.24	65.24	x	x	x	67.92	
9	Diego Morago	Chile	60.82	58.39	65.96				65.96	
10	Ignacio Guerra	Chile	x	64.88	65.51				65.51	
