= Andy Ronan =

Irish long-distance runner

Personal information
- Nationality: Irish
- Born: 19 June 1963 (age 63)

Sport
- Sport: Long-distance running
- Event: Marathon

Andy Ronan (born 19 June 1963) is an Irish long-distance runner. A graduate of Providence College (B.A., 1986) and an All-American runner for the Providence Friars, Ronan competed in the men's marathon at the 1992 Summer Olympics. He finished in third place in the 1991 Boston Marathon, just 21 seconds behind first-place finisher Ibrahim Hussein of Kenya, who would win that race three times.

He is currently the head coach of cross country and track and field at Stony Brook University on Long Island, NY where he coached NCAA All-American and future Olympian runner Lucy van Dalen, among others.

== Marathons ==
Year	Competition	Venue	Position	Notes
Representing Ireland
1989	Twin Cities Marathon	St. Paul, Minnesota, United States	4th	2:13:49
1990	London Marathon	London, United Kingdom	16th	2:13:30
1991	Boston Marathon	Boston, Massachusetts, United States	3rd	2:11:50
1991	Berlin Marathon	Berlin, Germany	7th	2:12:43
1992	Barcelona XXV Olympic Games	Barcelona, Spain	-	DNF
1993	Boston Marathon	Boston, Massachusetts, United States	12th	2:14:58
