= Ana María Nielsen =

Argentine distance runner (born 1951)

Personal information
- Full name: Ana María Nielsen Udrizard
- Nationality: Argentine
- Born: 11 April 1951 (age 74)

Sport
- Sport: Athletics
- Event(s): 800 metres, 1500 metres, marathon
- Club: Club Atlético Talleres
- Coached by: Juan Carsolio

Ana María Nielsen Udrizard (born 11 April 1951) is a retired Argentine middle-distance and marathon runner. She won multiple medals at continental level. She also held several national records.

She is of Danish descent.

== International competitions ==
Year	Competition	Venue	Position	Event	Notes
Representing Argentina
1971	South American Championships	Lima, Peru	5th (h)	800 m	2:19.6 ^{1}
1974	South American Championships	Santiago, Chile	1st	800 m	2:11.9
1974	South American Championships	Santiago, Chile	2nd	1500 m	4:33.5
1974	South American Championships	Santiago, Chile	5th	4 × 400 m relay	3:57.5
1975	South American Championships	Rio de Janeiro, Brazil	1st	1500 m	2:10.7
1975	South American Championships	Rio de Janeiro, Brazil	1st	1500 m	4:27.0
1975	Pan American Games	Mexico City, Mexico	4th	800 m	2:09.86
1975	Pan American Games	Mexico City, Mexico	5th	1500 m	4:37.80
1978	Southern Cross Games	La Paz, Bolivia	1st	800 m	2:15.85
1978	Southern Cross Games	La Paz, Bolivia	1st	1500 m	4:57.12
1989	21K Buenos Aires	Buenos Aires, Argentina	1st	Half marathon	1:17:38
1989	Buenos Aires Marathon	Buenos Aires, Argentina	1st	Marathon	2:43:58
1991	21K Buenos Aires	Buenos Aires, Argentina	1st	Half marathon	1:17:29
1991	Boston Marathon	Boston, United States	22nd	Marathon	2:47:45
1991	Buenos Aires Marathon	Buenos Aires, Argentina	1st	Marathon	2:42:44

^{1}Disqualified in the final

== Personal bests ==
Outdoor

- 800 metres – 2:09.86 A (Mexico City 1975; former NR)
- 1500 metres – 4:27.0h (Rio de Janeiro 1975; former NR)
- 3000 metres – 10:08.4h (Montevideo 1992)
- 5000 metres – 17:45.4h (Buenos Aires 1994)
- 10,000 metres – 37:05.4h (Montevideo 1992)
- Half marathon – 1:17:29 (Buenos Aires 1991)
- Marathon – 2:39:26 (Santa Rosa 1990; former NR)
