= Roxana Preussler =

Argentine long-distance runner

Roxana Preussler (born November 30, 1979) is a female marathon runner from Argentina, who won the 2005 edition of the Buenos Aires Marathon in her native country. She twice won the Mar del Plata Marathon (1999 and 2000).

== Achievements ==
Year	Competition	Venue	Position	Event	Notes
Representing Argentina
1999	Mar del Plata Marathon	Mar del Plata, Argentina	1st	Marathon	3:12:28
2000	Mar del Plata Marathon	Mar del Plata, Argentina	1st	Marathon	3:00:27
2005	South American Championships	Cali, Colombia	4th	10,000 m	35:53.90
2005	Buenos Aires Marathon	Buenos Aires, Argentina	1st	Marathon	2:49:49
2009	South American Championships	Lima, Peru	6th	5000 m	16:53.98
2009	South American Championships	Lima, Peru	6th	10,000 m	35:20.43

Sporting positions
Preceded by (Argentina) Lilia Gamboa	Mar del Plata Women's Marathon Winner; 1999 – 2000	Succeeded by (Argentina) Leonor Crundall
