= Enrique Aguirre =

Argentine decathlete

Personal information
- Born: December 6, 1979 (age 46)

Sport
- Sport: Track and field

Enrique Omar Aguirre (born December 6, 1979) is a retired male decathlete from Argentina who competed for his native country at the 2003 Pan American Games in Santo Domingo, Dominican Republic. He set his personal best score (7703 points) in Huelva on August 7, 2004. He is a two-time national champion in the men's decathlon (2002 and 2004).

== Achievements ==
Year	Competition	Venue	Position	Event	Notes
Representing Argentina
1998	South American Junior Championships	Córdoba, Argentina	2nd	Decathlon	6669 pts
1999	South American Championships	Bogotá, Colombia	4th	Decathlon	7040 pts
2000	Ibero-American Championships	Rio de Janeiro, Brazil	3rd	Decathlon	6943 pts
2001	South American Championships	Manaus, Brazil	3rd	Decathlon	7226 pts
2002	Ibero-American Championships	Guatemala City, Guatemala	5th	Decathlon	6031 pts
2003	South American Championships	Barquisimeto, Venezuela	3rd	Decathlon	6585 pts
2003	Pan American Games	Santo Domingo, Dominican Republic	5th	Decathlon	7356 pts
2004	Ibero-American Championships	Huelva, Spain	2nd	Decathlon	7703 pts
2005	South American Championships	Cali, Colombia	–	Decathlon	DNF
2006	Ibero-American Championships	Ponce, Puerto Rico	4th	Decathlon	5952 pts
2006	South American Championships	Tunja, Colombia	3rd	Decathlon	6683 pts
