= Sandra Torres (athlete) =

Argentine marathon runner

Sandra Edith Torres Álvarez (born December 21, 1974, in La Falda, Córdoba) is a marathon runner from Argentina. She is a four-time winner of the Buenos Aires Marathon in her native country (1999, 2001 and 2006) and represented Argentina in the women's marathon at the 2004 Summer Olympics in Athens, Greece.

== Achievements ==
- All results regarding marathon, unless stated otherwise

Year	Competition	Venue	Position	Notes
Representing Argentina
1999	Buenos Aires Marathon	Buenos Aires, Argentina	1st	2:47:36
2001	Buenos Aires Marathon	Buenos Aires, Argentina	1st	2:51:11
2004	Olympic Games	Athens, Greece	55th	2:54:48
2006	Buenos Aires Marathon	Buenos Aires, Argentina	1st	2:49:04
2008	Buenos Aires Marathon	Buenos Aires, Argentina	1st	2:48:04
