= Rubén Aguiar =

Argentine marathon runner

Rubén Humberto Aguiar (born July 21, 1956) is a retired male marathon runner from Argentina, who won the first edition of the Buenos Aires Marathon in 1984. He represented his native country in the men's marathon at the 1984 Summer Olympics in Los Angeles, California.

== Achievements ==
- All results regarding marathon, unless stated otherwise

Year	Competition	Venue	Position	Notes
Representing Argentina
1984	Buenos Aires Marathon	Buenos Aires, Argentina	1st	2:21:27
1984	Olympic Games	Los Angeles, United States	59th	2:31:18
1987	South American Championships	São Paulo, Brazil	4th	2:28:18
1988	Mar del Plata Marathon	Mar del Plata, Argentina	1st	2:23:54
