= Argentine Athletics Championships =

Outdoor track and field competition

- Sport: Track and field
- Founded: 120
- Country: Argentina

The Argentine Athletics Championships (Spanish: Campeonato Argentino de Atletismo) is an annual outdoor track and field competition organised by the Argentine Athletics Confederation , which serves as the national championship for the sport in Argentina.

The competition was first held in 1920 and women's events were included in 1939. Separate annual championship events are held for cross country running, road running and racewalking events. The competition celebrated a hundred years of existence in 2020.

== Events ==
The competition programme features a total of 38 individual Argentine Championship athletics events, 19 for men and 19 for women. For each of the sexes, there are seven track running events, three obstacle events, four jumps, four throws, and one combined track and field event.

Track running

- 100 metres, 200 metres, 400 metres, 800 metres, 1500 metres, 5000 metres, 10,000 metres

Obstacle events

- 100 metres hurdles (women only), 110 metres hurdles (men only), 400 metres hurdles, 3000 metres steeplechase

Jumping events

- Pole vault, high jump, long jump, triple jump

Throwing events

- Shot put, discus throw, javelin throw, hammer throw

Combined events

- Decathlon (men only), Heptathlon (women only)

A men's 3000 metres was on the programme up to 1961. A 20,000 metres race walk was regularly held between 1992 and 2004. and a men's pentathlon was also formerly contested, being dropped in 1973. The men's 10,000 metres race walk was a previously regular event that stopped after 1980.

The women's programme gradually expanded to match the men's. On the track, the 800 metres was first held in 1968, followed by the 400 metres in 1969, the 1500 metres in 1970, the 3000 metres in 1977, and the 10,000 m in 1986. The 3000 m was replaced by the international standard 5000 m in 1994 (the first 5000 m championships had been held in 1983–85). The women's 80 metres hurdles was replaced by the new standard 100 m hurdles in 1969. A 400 m hurdles event was introduced in 1977. The heptathlon was first held in 1981, replacing the long-standing women's pentathlon as the standard combined event. The women's field events reached parity with the men's after the addition of the triple jump and hammer throw in 1990, and the pole vault in 1994. From the period 1986–2004 women competed in racewalking, but this was dropped later. The women's steeplechase was the last event to be added to the schedule, with women first competing in a national championship event in 1999.
