= Lucio Guachalla =

Bolivian long-distance runner

Personal information
- Nationality: Bolivian
- Born: 19 October 1949 (age 76)

Sport
- Sport: Long-distance running
- Event: Marathon

Lucio Guachalla (born 19 October 1949) is a Bolivian long-distance runner. He competed in the marathon at the 1976 Summer Olympics.
