= Pablo Pietrobelli =

Argentine javelin thrower (born 1980)

Personal information
- Full name: Pablo Andrés Pietrobelli
- Nationality: Argentina
- Born: 14 June 1980 (age 46) Bahía Blanca, Buenos Aires, Argentina
- Height: 1.72 m (5 ft 7 1/2 in)
- Weight: 76 kg (168 lb)

Sport
- Sport: Athletics
- Event: Javelin throw

Achievements and titles
- Personal best: Javelin throw: 79.45 m (2007)
Medal record
Men's athletics
Representing Argentina
Ibero-American Championships
Bronze medal – third place	2006 Ponce	Javelin throw

Pablo Andrés Pietrobelli (born 14 June 1980) is an Argentine javelin thrower. He won the bronze medal for his category at the 2006 Ibero-American Championships in Ponce, Puerto Rico, with a throw of 72.50 metres. In 2007, he set both his personal best throw and a national record of 79.45 metres by winning the gold medal at the South American Grand Prix in Bogotá, Colombia.

Pietrobelli represented Argentina at the 2008 Summer Olympics in Beijing, where he competed for the men's javelin throw. He placed thirty-fourth overall in the qualifying rounds, with a throw of 69.09 metres, failing to advance into the final.

== Competition record ==
Year	Competition	Venue	Position	Event	Notes
Representing Argentina
1997	South American Junior Championships	San Carlos, Uruguay	4th	Javelin throw	58.04 m
1998	South American Junior Championships	Córdoba, Argentina	7th	Javelin throw	55.76 m
1999	Pan American Junior Championships	Tampa, United States	4th	Javelin throw	64.19 m
1999	South American Junior Championships	Concepción, Chile	3rd	Javelin throw	63.13 m
2001	South American Championships	Manaus, Brazil	5th	Javelin throw	68.64 m
2002	Ibero-American Championships	Guatemala City, Guatemala	6th	Javelin throw	67.66 m
2003	South American Championships	Barquisimeto, Venezuela	8th	Javelin throw	66.97 m
2005	South American Championships	Cali, Colombia	5th	Javelin throw	68.48 m
2006	Ibero-American Championships	Ponce, Puerto Rico	3rd	Javelin throw	72.50 m
2006	South American Championships	Tunja, Colombia	4th	Javelin throw	75.06 m
2007	South American Championships	São Paulo, Brazil	1st	Javelin throw	76.52 m
2007	Pan American Games	Rio de Janeiro, Brazil	6th	Javelin throw	70.62 m
2007	World Championships	Osaka, Japan	26th (q)	Javelin throw	74.81 m
2008	Ibero-American Championships	Iquique, Chile	6th	Javelin throw	69.93 m
2008	Olympic Games	Beijing, China	34th (q)	Javelin throw	69.09 m
