= Adriana Calvo =

Docent and human rights activist from Argentina

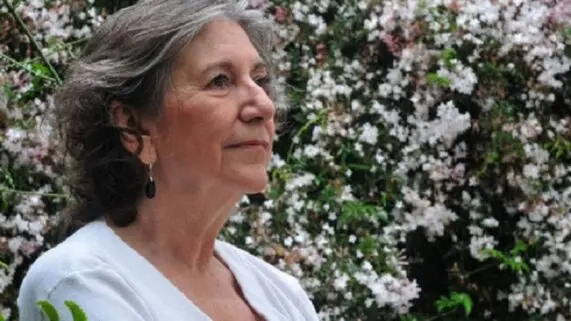
- Born: Adriana Lelia Calvo; 16 December 1947; Buenos Aires, Argentina
- Died: 12 December 2010 (aged 62); Buenos Aires, Argentina
- Education: National University of La Plata
- Occupation: Physicist
- Spouse: Miguel Ángel Laborde

Adriana Lelia Calvo (16 December 1947 – 12 December 2010) was an Argentine physicist, university professor, and researcher. After being kidnapped by the military government during the Argentine civil-military dictatorship, she became a human rights activist, and was the first witness to testify at the Trial of the Juntas in 1985.

== Biography ==
Adriana Calvo was born in Argentina in 1947. She earned a licentiate in physics from the National University of La Plata (UNLP) in 1970. Until 1977, she worked as a teacher and researcher at UNLP's Faculty of Exact Sciences, after which she was a professor of physics at the Faculty of Engineering of the University of Buenos Aires (UBA). She was active in teachers' unions at both institutions, and is recognized as one of the main founders of the Asociación Gremial Docente (AGD).

On 4 February 1977, she was arrested at her home in Tolosa by agents of the civil-military dictatorship. At the time, she was six months pregnant. Her husband, the chemist Miguel Ángel Laborde (a professor at the UBA Faculty of Engineering and a CONICET researcher), was also detained.

Calvo was held clandestinely in various offices of the Buenos Aires Provincial Police: the Investigation Brigade of the City of La Plata, the Arana Police Detachment, the 5th Police Station of La Plata, and the Banfield Investigation Brigade, called "Pozo de Banfield". During her transfer to the latter, she gave birth to her third daughter while handcuffed in the back of a military car.

Calvo and her newborn daughter were released on 28 April 1977. Immediately afterward, she tried to communicate with the families of other detainees. In the case of Inés Ortega and her son born in captivity, she asked her UNLP colleague, physicist Ana Buenaventura Mocoroa, for help. She was the first witness at the Trial of the Juntas in 1985. She continued to advocate for human rights, becoming a leader of the Association of Former Disappeared Detainees (AEDD).

After her release, Calvo continued her academic life. She obtained her PhD in physics at UNLP in 1993. She was in turn director of two doctoral students at the UBA Faculty of Engineering between 1996 and 2002. Their theses dealt with porous media and granular materials.

Adriana Calvo died in Buenos Aires on 12 December 2010.

== Legacy ==
Her death was mourned by human rights organizations, her colleagues, and the community in general. Among the numerous notices was a profile published by the three children that Adriana had with Miguel Ángel Laborde, and a recognition by the Senator Norma Morandini, who wrote:

We will never finish thanking and acknowledging those survivors who, overcoming their own fear, reduced to numbers and silence, regained their legal status and recounted their ordeal before the five judges. Those of us who were there will never forget the testimony of Adriana Calvo, who, handcuffed and bandaged, had her baby on the side of a road. Adriana turned her ordeal into a fighting force and was one of the voices in solidarity with the tragedies of others.

On 17 May 2011, Calvo was honored with a series of activities in her memory at ESPCI Paris.
