= Joan Wenzel =

Canadian middle-distance runner (born 1953)

Personal information
- Born: 24 November 1953 (age 72) Hamilton, Ontario, Canada

Sport
- Sport: Middle-distance running
- Event: 800 metres

Joan Wenzel (born 24 November 1953) is a retired Canadian middle-distance runner. She competed in the women's 800 metres at the 1976 Summer Olympics.

Shortly after finishing in third place in the 800m at the 1975 Pan American Games, Wenzel tested positive for ephedrine caused by her cold tablets and she was initially issued with a life ban by the IAAF in accordance with the applicable rules. However the following April, the IAAF removed the ban and Wenzel returned to competition, notably at the 1976 Olympics.
