= Juan Adolfo Turri =

Argentinian athlete

Personal information
- Born: 22 December 1950 Alta Gracia, Argentina
- Died: 16 March 2010 (aged 59) Rosario, Argentina
- Height: 1.97 m (6 ft 6 in)
- Weight: 115 kg (254 lb)

Sport
- Sport: Athletics
- Event: Shot put

Juan Adolfo Turri (22 December 1950 – 16 March 2010) was an Argentine athlete. He competed in the men's shot put at the 1976 Summer Olympics.

== International competitions ==
Year	Competition	Venue	Position	Event	Notes
Representing Argentina
1968	South American Junior Championships	São Bernardo do Campo, Brazil	1st	Shot put	16.94 m
1969	South American Championships	Quito, Ecuador	3rd	Shot put	15.64 m
1971	South American Championships	Lima, Peru	2nd	Shot put	15.73 m
1974	South American Championships	Santiago, Chile	8th	Long jump	6.75 m
1974	South American Championships	Santiago, Chile	1st	Shot put	17.09 m
1975	South American Championships	Rio de Janeiro, Brazil	1st	Shot put	18.21 m
1975	Pan American Games	Mexico City, Mexico	4th	Shot put	18.30 m
1976	Olympic Games	Montreal, Canada	21st (q)	Shot put	17.76 m
1981	South American Championships	La Paz, Bolivia	2nd	Shot put	16.54 m
1981	South American Championships	La Paz, Bolivia	6th	Discus throw	44.12 m
1983	South American Championships	Santa Fe, Argentina	2nd	Shot put	16.56 m

== Personal bests ==
- Shot put – 18.73 (Rio de Janeiro 1975; former NR)
- Discus throw – 49.04 (Buenos Aires 1975)
