= Miro Ronac =

Peruvian decathlete

Personal information
- Nationality: Peruvian
- Born: 16 October 1961 (age 63)

Sport
- Sport: Athletics
- Event: Decathlon

Miro Ronac (born 16 October 1961) is a Peruvian athlete. He competed in the men's decathlon at the 1980 Summer Olympics.
