= Ana María Campillay =

Argentine javelin thrower (1950–2021)

Personal information
- Born: 12 June 1950 Comodoro Rivadavia, Argentina
- Died: 3 June 2021 (aged 70)

Sport
- Sport: Athletics
- Event: Javelin throw

Ana María Campillay (12 June 1950 – 3 June 2021) was an Argentine athlete who competed in the javelin throw. She won several medals at continental level.

Her personal best in the javelin throw (old model) was 48.92 metres set in Santiago de Chile in 1980.

Campillay died on 3 June 2021 in her hometown of Comodoro Rivadavia.

== International competitions ==
Year	Competition	Venue	Position	Event	Notes
Representing Argentina
1971	South American Championships	Lima, Peru	1st	Javelin throw	43.92 m
1974	South American Championships	Santiago, Chile	2nd	Javelin throw	43.18 m
1977	South American Championships	Montevideo, Uruguay	4th	Javelin throw	40.62 m
1978	Southern Cross Games	La Paz, Bolivia	1st	Javelin throw	46.72 m
1979	South American Championships	Bucaramanga, Colombia	3rd	Javelin throw	42.30 m
1981	South American Championships	La Paz, Bolivia	3rd	Javelin throw	47.70 m
1982	Southern Cross Games	Santa Fe, Argentina	2nd	Javelin throw	46.22 m
1985	South American Championships	Santiago, Chile	6th	Javelin throw	43.06 m
