= Oscar Veit =

Argentine high jumper

Personal information
- Full name: Oscar Armando Veit
- Nationality: Argentine
- Born: 11 September 1963 (age 63)

Sport
- Sport: Athletics
- Event: Pole vault

Oscar Armando Veit (born 11 September 1963) is a retired Argentine athlete who specialised in the pole vault. He won multiple medals on regional level.

His personal best on the event is 5.27 metres, set in Córdoba in 1994, which at the time was the national record.

== International competitions ==
Year	Competition	Venue	Position	Event	Notes
Representing Argentina
1982	Southern Cross Games	Rosario, Argentina	5th	Pole vault	4.40 m
1983	South American Championships	Santa Fe, Argentina	3rd	Pole vault	4.50 m
1985	South American Championships	Santiago, Chile	1st	Pole vault	4.90 m
1986	Ibero-American Championships	Havana, Cuba	–	Pole vault	NM
1986	South American Games	Santiago, Chile	1st	Pole vault	5.01 m
1987	Pan American Games	Indianapolis, United States	4th	Pole vault	4.90 m
1987	South American Championships	São Paulo, Brazil	1st	Pole vault	5.25 m
1988	Ibero-American Championships	Mexico City, Mexico	–	Pole vault	NM
1989	South American Championships	Medellín, Colombia	5th	Pole vault	4.70 m
1989	South American Championships	Medellín, Colombia	3rd	Decathlon	7033 pts
1990	Ibero-American Championships	Manaus, Brazil	4th	Pole vault	4.80 m
1990	South American Games	Lima, Peru	3rd	Pole vault	4.70 m
1992	Ibero-American Championships	Seville, Spain	9th	Pole vault	4.80 m
1992	Ibero-American Championships	Seville, Spain	–	Decathlon	DNF
1993	South American Championships	Lima, Peru	1st	Pole vault	4.95 m
1994	Ibero-American Championships	Mar del Plata, Argentina	6th	Pole vault	4.90 m
1994	South American Games	Valencia, Venezuela	1st	Pole vault	5.10 m
1995	Pan American Games	Mar del Plata, Argentina	6th	Pole vault	5.05 m
1995	South American Championships	Manaus, Brazil	2nd	Pole vault	4.60 m
1997	South American Championships	Mar del Plata, Argentina	1st	Pole vault	4.85 m
1998	Ibero-American Championships	Lisbon, Portugal	9th	Pole vault	4.80 m
1999	South American Championships	Bogotá, Colombia	5th	Pole vault	4.80 m

== Personal bests ==
Outdoor

- 110 metres hurdles – 15.92 seconds (Santiago de Chile 1990)
- High jump – 2.05 metres (Santa Fe 1989)
- Pole vault – 5.27 metres (Córdoba 1994)
- Long jump – 7.28 metres (Buenos Aires 1993)
- Javelin throw – 58.02 metres (Santiago de Chile 1989)
- Decathlon – 7173 points (Buenos Aires 1989)

Indoor

- Pole vault – 5.00 metres (Prague 1988)
