= Mar del Plata Marathon =

Marathon foot-race

The Maratón de Mar del Plata is an annual marathon foot-race that takes place in Mar del Plata, Argentina, during the Southern Hemisphere's summer.

== Past winners ==
Key: Course record

Year	Men's winner	Time (h:m:s)	Women's winner	Time (h:m:s)
2017	Mariano Mastromarino (ARG)	2:24:13	María Peralta (ARG)	2:54:30
2016	Ulises Sanguinetti (ARG)	2:25:18	Mariel Alasia (ARG)	2:56:03
2015	Nicolás Ternavasio (ARG)	2:20:50	Karina Neipán (ARG)	2:45:43
2014	Matías Schiel (ARG)	2:26:51	Valeria Rodríguez (ARG)	2:46:20
2013	Mariano Mastromarino (ARG)	2:29:24	Andrea Graciano (ARG)	2:50:17
2012	Matías Schiel (ARG)	2:45:17	Florencia Borelli (ARG)	3:04:17
2008	Raimondo Freijoo (ARG)	2:38:20	Ennia Barrera (ARG)	3:28:13
2007	Juan José Perez (ARG)	2:52:48	Vanessa Bentacurt (ARG)	3:44:59
2006	Raúl González (ARG)	2:39:07	Laura Aspiroz (ARG)	3:18:00
2005	Sergio Palma (ARG)	2:32:09	Alejandra Calcagno (ARG)	3:16:22
2004	Manuel Méndez (ARG)	2:42:49	Andrea Virasoro (ARG)	3:24:13
2003	Manuel Méndez (ARG)	2:41:24	Soledad Virasoro (ARG)	3:35:53
2002	Claudio Burgos (ARG)	2:28:43	Leonor Crundall (ARG)	3:17:40
2001	Waldemar Cotelo (URU)	2:24:01	Leonor Crundall (ARG)	3:16:01
2000	Cristian Malgioglio (ARG)	2:37:16	Roxana Preussler (ARG)	3:00:27
1999	Oscar Alarcón (ARG)	2:22:58	Roxana Preussler (ARG)	3:12:28
1998	Tranquilino Valenzuela (ARG)	2:21:15	Lilia Gamboa (ARG)	3:17:41
1997	Rubén Coria (ARG)	2:26:47	María Teresa Aguerre (ARG)	2:59:11
1996	Toribio Gutiérrez (ARG)	2:28:42	Lilia Gamboa (ARG)	3:10:35
1995	Carlos Daniel López (ARG)	2:32:29	Elsa Guevara (ARG)	3:13:02
1994	Daniel Pardo (ARG)	2:33:40	Epifania Carhuas (PER)	3:23:11
1993	Valmir de Carvalho (BRA)	2:19:49	Nercy da Freitas (BRA)	2:48:32
1992	Hipólito Cardozo (ARG)	2:33:48	Epifania Carhuas (PER)	3:09:01
1991	Carlos Edgar Barria (ARG)	2:29:15	Mirta Rodríguez (ARG)	3:28:12
1990	Carlos Edgar Barria (ARG)	2:21:47	Nélida Olivet (ARG)	2:55:43
1989	Toribio Gutiérrez (ARG)	2:19:41	Nélida Olivet (ARG)	2:54:50
1988	Rubén Aguiar (ARG)	2:23:54	Nélida Olivet (ARG)	3:11:34
1987	Toribio Gutiérrez (ARG)	2:22:05	Norma Fernández (ARG)	2:59:18
