= Elisa Cobañea =

Argentine long-distance runner

Personal information
- Full name: Elisa Noëmí Cobañea
- Nationality: Argentine
- Born: 20 May 1966 (age 60)

Sport
- Sport: Long-distance running
- Event: 5000 metres

Elisa Noëmí Cobañea (born 20 May 1966) is an Argentine long-distance runner. She competed in the women's 5000 metres at the 2000 Summer Olympics.
