= Athletics at the 2001 Summer Universiade – Women's 1500 metres =

The women's 1500 metres event at the 2001 Summer Universiade was held at the Workers Stadium in Beijing, China on 28 and 29 August.

The winning margin was 1.93 seconds which as of 2024 is the greatest winning margin in the women's 1500 metres at these games.

== Medalists ==
| Gold | Silver | Bronze |
|---|---|---|
| Süreyya Ayhan; Turkey | Maria Cristina Grosu; Romania | Sabine Fischer; Switzerland |

== Results ==
=== Heats ===
| Rank | Heat | Athlete | Nationality | Time | Notes |
|---|---|---|---|---|---|
| 1 | 1 | Süreyya Ayhan | Turkey | 4:13.79 | Q |
| 2 | 1 | Nataliya Sydorenko | Ukraine | 4:14.76 | Q |
| 3 | 1 | Renata Hoppová | Czech Republic | 4:14.95 | Q |
| 4 | 1 | Jenelle Deatherage | United States | 4:14.96 | q |
| 5 | 2 | Maria Cristina Grosu | Romania | 4:15.18 | Q |
| 6 | 2 | Ljiljana Ćulibrk | Croatia | 4:15.29 | Q |
| 7 | 1 | Malindi Elmore | Canada | 4:15.37 | q |
| 8 | 2 | Sabine Fischer | Switzerland | 4:15.49 | Q |
| 9 | 2 | Iryna Lishchynska | Ukraine | 4:15.87 | q |
| 10 | 2 | Nédia Semedo | Portugal | 4:16.24 | |
| 11 | 1 | Mariah Lynch | Ireland | 4:16.43 | |
| 12 | 3 | Elena Buhaianu-Iagăr | Romania | 4:17.45 | Q |
| 13 | 1 | Irina Krakoviak | Lithuania | 4:17.53 | |
| 14 | 3 | Olga Roseyeva | Russia | 4:17.68 | Q |
| 15 | 1 | René Kalmer | South Africa | 4:17.70 | |
| 16 | 3 | Mary Jayne Harrelson | United States | 4:17.76 | Q |
| 17 | 3 | Rasa Drazdauskaitė | Lithuania | 4:18.19 | |
| 18 | 2 | Tok Ko-Sun Ok | North Korea | 4:18.34 | |
| 19 | 3 | Kelly Caffell | Great Britain | 4:18.36 | |
| 20 | 3 | Lisbeth Pedersen | Norway | 4:18.50 | |
| 21 | 2 | Anjolie Wisse | Netherlands | 4:19.12 | |
| 22 | 3 | Li Jingnan | China | 4:19.13 | |
| 23 | 3 | Andrea Grove | Canada | 4:19.19 | |
| 24 | 2 | Lan Lixin | China | 4:19.93 | |
| 25 | 1 | Emily Morris | Australia | 4:23.28 | |
| 26 | 2 | Kate McIlroy | Ireland | 4:25.95 | |
| 27 | 2 | Sara Palmas | Italy | 4:27.38 | |
| 28 | 3 | Khadija Touati | Algeria | 4:27.43 | |
| 29 | 3 | Fiona Crombie | New Zealand | 4:32.48 | |
| 30 | 3 | Victoria Moradeyo | Nigeria | 4:38.47 | |
| 31 | 3 | Jouma Kekana | South Africa | 4:39.65 | |
| 32 | 2 | Maysa Hussein Matrood | Iraq | 4:40.56 | |
| 33 | 1 | Evelyn Rojas | Costa Rica | 4:41.12 | |
| 34 | 3 | Amal Al-Matary | Jordan | 4:48.55 | |
| 35 | 2 | P. N. Somaratne | Sri Lanka | 4:53.90 | |
| 36 | 1 | Karla Silva | Peru | 4:56.19 | |

=== Final ===
| Rank | Athlete | Nationality | Time | Notes |
|---|---|---|---|---|
| 1st place, gold medalist(s) | Süreyya Ayhan | Turkey | 4:06.91 | |
| 2nd place, silver medalist(s) | Maria Cristina Grosu | Romania | 4:08.84 | |
| 3rd place, bronze medalist(s) | Sabine Fischer | Switzerland | 4:08.93 | |
| 4 | Mary Jayne Harrelson | United States | 4:11.68 | |
| 5 | Nataliya Sydorenko | Ukraine | 4:12.38 | |
| 6 | Olga Roseyeva | Russia | 4:12.53 | |
| 7 | Ljiljana Ćulibrk | Croatia | 4:12.58 | |
| 8 | Elena Buhaianu-Iagăr | Romania | 4:12.75 | |
| 9 | Jenelle Deatherage | United States | 4:13.89 | |
| 10 | Malindi Elmore | Canada | 4:14.66 | |
| 11 | Renata Hoppová | Czech Republic | 4:18.29 | |
| 12 | Iryna Lishchynska | Ukraine | 4:33.81 | |
