= 2004 IAAF World Indoor Championships – Women's 800 metres =

2004 IAAF World Indoor Championships

The Women's 800 metres event at the 2004 IAAF World Indoor Championships was held on March 5–7.

== Medalists ==
Gold	Silver	Bronze
Maria Mutola; Mozambique	Jolanda Čeplak; Slovenia	Joanne Fenn; Great Britain

== Results ==
=== Heat ===
First 2 of each heat (Q) and next 2 fastest (q) qualified for the semifinals.

Rank	Heat	Name	Nationality	Time	Notes
1	5	Maria Mutola	Mozambique	1:57.72	Q
2	2	Jolanda Čeplak	Slovenia	2:01.48	Q
3	2	Sandra Stals	Belgium	2:01.88	Q, SB
4	2	Tetiana Petlyuk	Ukraine	2:01.90	q
5	3	Mayte Martínez	Spain	2:02.78	Q
6	3	Seltana Aït Hammou	Morocco	2:02.83	Q, PB
7	4	Olga Raspopova	Russia	2:03.67	Q
8	2	Aimee Teteris	Canada	2:03.75	q
9	4	Joanne Fenn	Great Britain	2:04.01	Q
10	5	Mina Aït Hammou	Morocco	2:04.30	Q
11	4	Marian Burnett	Guyana	2:04.48	NR
12	5	Monika Gradzki	Germany	2:04.68	
13	5	Liliana Popescu	Romania	2:04.75	
14	1	Jennifer Toomey	United States	2:04.84	Q
15	1	Tatyana Andrianova	Russia	2:05.04	Q
16	1	Agnes Samaria	Namibia	2:05.05	
17	2	Mary Jayne Harrelson	United States	2:05.16	
18	4	Esther Desviat	Spain	2:05.66	
19	3	Meskerem Assefa	Ethiopia	2:05.83	
20	3	Michelle Ballentine	Jamaica	2:05.94	
21	4	Lotte Visschers	Netherlands	2:06.49	
22	1	Heather Hennigar	Canada	2:06.68	
23	3	Sandra Teixeira	Portugal	2:06.74	
24	1	Sheena Gooding	Barbados	2:06.97	SB
25	1	Lwiza Msyani John	Tanzania	2:06.97	
26	3	Noelly Bibiche Mankatu	Democratic Republic of the Congo	2:07.62	SB
27	5	Christiane dos Santos	Brazil	2:07.77	
28	2	Marlyse Nsourou	Gabon	2:21.57	
29	4	Sloan Siegrist	Guam	2:22.72	

=== Semifinals ===
First 3 of each semifinal (Q) qualified for the final.

Rank	Heat	Name	Nationality	Time	Notes
1	1	Jolanda Čeplak	Slovenia	1:59.26	Q
2	1	Tatyana Andrianova	Russia	1:59.96	Q, PB
3	1	Joanne Fenn	Great Britain	2:00.79	Q
4	1	Mayte Martínez	Spain	2:01.06	
5	1	Seltana Aït Hammou	Morocco	2:02.33	
6	2	Maria Mutola	Mozambique	2:03.19	Q
7	2	Jen Toomey	United States	2:03.40	Q
8	2	Olga Raspopova	Russia	2:03.71	Q
9	2	Tetiana Petlyuk	Ukraine	2:05.10	
10	2	Sandra Stals	Belgium	2:05.12	
11	1	Aimee Teteris	Canada	2:05.29	
12	2	Mina Aït Hammou	Morocco	2:06.17	

=== Final ===
Rank	Name	Nationality	Time	Notes
1st place, gold medalist(s)	Maria Mutola	Mozambique	1:58.50	
2nd place, silver medalist(s)	Jolanda Čeplak	Slovenia	1:58.72	SB
3rd place, bronze medalist(s)	Joanne Fenn	Great Britain	1:59.50	NR
4	Jen Toomey	United States	1:59.64	PB
5	Tatyana Andrianova	Russia	1:59.71	PB
6	Olga Raspopova	Russia	2:00.56	
