= Jennifer Toomey =

Jennifer Toomey may refer to:

- Jenny Toomey (born 1968), American musician
- Jen Toomey (born 1971), American track athlete
