= Athletics at the 2011 Pan American Games – Women's 1500 metres =

Women's 1500 metres at the 2011 Pan American Games
- Venue: Telmex Athletics Stadium
- Dates: 27 October
- Competitors: 12 from 9 nations

Medalists
Gold medal	Adriana Muñoz	Cuba
Silver medal	Rosibel García	Colombia
Bronze medal	Malindi Elmore	Canada

The women's 1500 metres competition of the athletics events at the 2011 Pan American Games took place on 27 October at the Telmex Athletics Stadium. The defending Pan American Games champion, Juliana Paula dos Santos of Brazil, did not compete.

== Records ==
Prior to this competition, the existing world and Pan American Games records were as follows:

World record	Qu Yunxia (CHN)	3:50.46	Beijing, China	11 September 1993
Pan American Games record	Mary Decker (USA)	4:05.70	San Juan, Puerto Rico	13 July 1979

== Qualification ==
Each National Olympic Committee (NOC) was able to enter one athlete regardless if they had met the qualification standard. To enter two entrants both athletes had to have met the minimum standard (4:25.0) in the qualifying period (1 January 2010 to 14 September 2011).

== Schedule ==
Date	Time	Round
27 October 2011	17:05	Final

== Results ==
All times shown are in seconds.

KEY:	q	Fastest non-qualifiers	Q	Qualified	NR	National record	PB	Personal best	SB	Seasonal best	DQ	Disqualified

=== Final ===
Held on 27 October.

Rank	Name	Nationality	Time	Notes
1st place, gold medalist(s)	Adriana Muñoz	Cuba	4:26.09	
2nd place, silver medalist(s)	Rosibel García	Colombia	4:26.78	
3rd place, bronze medalist(s)	Malindi Elmore	Canada	4:27.57	
4	Fabiana Cristine da Silva	Brazil	4:28.33	
5	Urdileidis Quiala	Cuba	4:29.08	
6	Sandra Amarillo	Argentina	4:29.49	
7	Pilar McShine	Trinidad and Tobago	4:30.05	
8	Gladys Landaverde	El Salvador	4:31.43	
9	Nancy Gallo	Argentina	4:31.96	
10	Annick Lamar	United States	4:32.57	
11	Jacqueline Areson	United States	4:34.23	
12	Beverly Ramos	Puerto Rico	4:34.90	
