= Christiane Ritz =

Brazilian middle-distance runner

Christiane Ritz dos Santos
Personal information
- Full name: Christiane Ritz dos Santos Schieck
- Born: October 6, 1981 (age 44) Santa Cruz do Sul, Rio Grande do Sul, Brazil
- Height: 1.70 m (5 ft 7 in)
- Weight: 43 kg (95 lb)

Sport
- Country: Brazil
- Sport: Athletics
- Event: Middle-distance running
Medal record
Representing Brazil
Military World Games
Gold medal – first place	2011 Rio de Janeiro	4×400 m relay
Pan American Games
Bronze medal – third place	2003 Santo Domingo	800m
South American Games
Bronze medal – third place	2014 Santiago	800m
- Updated on 14 October 2015

Christiane Ritz dos Santos (born 6 October 1981 in Santa Cruz do Sul, Rio Grande do Sul) is a Brazilian middle-distance runner who competes in the 800 metres and 1500 metres events. She won the bronze medal at the 2003 Pan American Games. In addition, she finished fifth at the 2003 Summer Universiade.

== Competition record ==
Year	Competition	Venue	Position	Event	Notes
Representing Brazil
1996	South American Youth Championships	Asunción, Paraguay	1st	800 m	2:13.16
1997	South American Junior Championships	San Carlos, Uruguay	2nd	800 m	2:09.92
1997	South American Junior Championships	San Carlos, Uruguay	1st	4 × 400 m relay	3:44.11
1997	Pan American Junior Championships	Havana, Cuba	6th	800 m	2:09.99
1997	Pan American Junior Championships	Havana, Cuba	6th	4 × 400 m relay	3:47.33
1998	South American Junior Championships	Córdoba, Argentina	2nd	800 m	2:12.73
1998	South American Junior Championships	Córdoba, Argentina	1st	4 × 400 m relay	3:46.79
1999	South American Junior Championships	Concepción, Chile	3rd	400 m	55.60
1999	South American Junior Championships	Concepción, Chile	1st	800 m	2:06.68
1999	South American Junior Championships	Concepción, Chile	2nd	4 × 400 m relay	3:46.66
1999	Pan American Junior Championships	Tampa, Florida, United States	5th	800 m	2:16.21
2002	Ibero-American Championships	Guatemala City, Guatemala	1st	800 m	2:06.30
2002	Ibero-American Championships	Guatemala City, Guatemala	–	1500 m	DNF
2003	South American Championships	Barquisimeto, Venezuela	2nd	800 m	2:02.50
2003	Pan American Games	Santo Domingo, Dominican Republic	3rd	800 m	2:04.37
2003	Universiade	Daegu, South Korea	5th	800 m	2:01.53
2004	World Indoor Championships	Budapest, Hungary	27th (h)	800 m	2:07.77
2006	Ibero-American Championships	Ponce, Puerto Rico	5th	800 m	2:06.32
2006	Ibero-American Championships	Ponce, Puerto Rico	4th	1500 m	4:30.67
2006	South American Championships	Tunja, Colombia	1st	800 m	2:10.15
2008	Ibero-American Championships	Iquique, Chile	1st	800 m	2:04.34
2008	Ibero-American Championships	Iquique, Chile	7th	1500 m	4:31.85
2009	South American Championships	Lima, Peru	2nd	800 m	2:06.72
2009	Lusophony Games	Lisbon, Portugal	2nd	800 m	2:07.14
2009	Lusophony Games	Lisbon, Portugal	3rd	1500 m	4:21.45
2010	Ibero-American Championships	San Fernando, Spain	5th	800 m	2:04.25
2011	South American Championships	Buenos Aires, Argentina	4th	800 m	2:06.04
2011	Military World Games	Rio de Janeiro, Brazil	5th	800 m	2:02.08
2011	Military World Games	Rio de Janeiro, Brazil	7th	1500 m	4:23.22
2011	Military World Games	Rio de Janeiro, Brazil	1st	4 × 400 m relay	3:32.42
2011	Pan American Games	Guadalajara, Mexico	5th	800 m	2:06.15
2012	Ibero-American Championships	Barquisimeto, Venezuela	5th	800 m	2:04.87
2012	Ibero-American Championships	Barquisimeto, Venezuela	7th	1500 m	4:23.45
2013	South American Championships	Cartagena, Colombia	4th	800 m	2:06.61
2013	South American Championships	Cartagena, Colombia	8th	1500 m	4:23.86
2014	South American Games	Santiago, Chile	3rd	800 m	2:07.96

== Personal bests ==
Outdoor

- 400 metres – 54.48 (Pergine Valsugana, Italy, 25 July 2003)
- 800 metres – 2:00.98 (São Paulo, Brazil, 28 June 2003)
- 1500 metres – 4:17.68 (Belém, Brazil, 5 May 2002)

Indoor

- 800 metres – 2:03.61 (Fayetteville, Arkansas, United States, 13 February 2004)
