= Athletics at the 2015 Pan American Games – Women's 1500 metres =

Women's 1500 metres at the 2015 Pan American Games
- Venue: CIBC Pan Am and Parapan Am Athletics Stadium
- Dates: July 25
- Competitors: 12 from 9 nations
- Winning time: 4:09.05 NR

Medalists
| Gold medal | Muriel Coneo | Colombia |
| Silver medal | Nicole Sifuentes | Canada |
| Bronze medal | Sasha Gollish | Canada |

The women's 1500 metres sprint competition of the athletics events at the 2015 Pan American Games will take place 25 July at the CIBC Pan Am and Parapan Am Athletics Stadium in Toronto, Canada. The defending Pan American Games champion is Adriana Muñoz of Cuba.

== Records ==
Prior to this competition, the existing world and Pan American Games records were as follows:

| World record | Qu Yunxia (CHN) | 3:50.46 | Beijing, China | September 11, 1993 |
| Pan American Games record | Mary Decker (USA) | 4:05.70 | San Juan, Puerto Rico | July 13, 1979 |

== Qualification ==
Each National Olympic Committee (NOC) was able to enter up to two entrants providing they had met the minimum standard (4.26.00) in the qualifying period (January 1, 2014 to June 28, 2015).

== Schedule ==
| Date | Time | Round |
|---|---|---|
| July 25, 2015 | 19:00 | Final |

== Results ==
All times shown are in seconds.

| KEY: | q | Fastest non-qualifiers | Q | Qualified | NR | National record | PB | Personal best | SB | Seasonal best | DQ | Disqualified |

=== Final ===
| Rank | Name | Nationality | Time | Notes |
|---|---|---|---|---|
| 1st place, gold medalist(s) | Muriel Coneo | Colombia | 4:09.05 | NR |
| 2nd place, silver medalist(s) | Nicole Sifuentes | Canada | 4:09.13 | |
| 3rd place, bronze medalist(s) | Sasha Gollish | Canada | 4:10.11 | |
| 4 | Cory McGee | United States | 4:11.12 | |
| 5 | Flávia de Lima | Brazil | 4:16.53 | |
| 6 | Arletis Thaureaux | Cuba | 4:19.60 | PB |
| 7 | Cristina Guevara | Mexico | 4:20.40 | SB |
| 8 | Andrea Ferris | Panama | 4:23.96 | SB |
| 9 | Maria Osorio | Venezuela | 4:24.45 | |
| 10 | Kleidiane Jardin | Brazil | 4:24.86 | |
| 11 | Pia Fernández | Uruguay | 4:27.17 | |
| | Adriana Muñoz | Cuba | DNF | |
