= Athletics at the 2003 Pan American Games – Women's 800 metres =

Women's 800 metres at the Pan American Games

The final of the Women's 800 metres event at the 2003 Pan American Games took place on Wednesday August 6, 2003, with the heats staged a day earlier. Marian Burnett won the only silver medal for Guyana at the 2003 Pan American Games. Letitia Vriesde won the race when it was held, but was disqualified a few days later after testing positive for excessive levels of caffeine. The gold medal was therefore awarded to Adriana Muñoz.

== Medalists ==
Gold	Adriana Muñoz; Cuba
Silver	Marian Burnett; Guyana
Bronze	Christiane dos Santos; Brazil

== Records ==
World Record	Jarmila Kratochvílová (TCH)	1:53.28	July 26, 1983	Munich, West Germany
Pan Am Record	Ana Fidelia Quirot (CUB)	1:58.71	August 8, 1991	Havana, Cuba

== Results ==
Rank	Athlete	Heats		Final
Rank	Athlete	Time	Rank	Time
1	Adriana Muñoz (CUB)	2:03.65	2	2:02.96
2	Marian Burnett (GUY)	2:04.17	4	2:03.58
3	Christiane dos Santos (BRA)	2:04.09	3	2:04.37
4	Yanelis Lara (CUB)	2:04.20	5	2:04.58
5	Luciana Mendes (BRA)	2:04.28	6	2:05.52
6	Sheena Gooding (BAR)	2:04.77	7	2:06.28
7	Hazel Clark (USA)	2:03.54	1	2:09.12
—	Letitia Vriesde (SUR)		DSQ	~~2:02.92~~
9	Neisha Bernard-Thomas (GRN)	2:04.22	9	
10	Melissa de Leon (TRI)	2:05.06	10	
11	Sandra Moya (PUR)	2:05.52	11	
12	Tamika Williams (BER)	2:06.16	12	
13	Rosibel García (COL)	2:08.08	13	
14	Kenia Sinclair (JAM)	2:10.51	14	
15	Gabriela Medina (MEX)	2:10.69	15	
16	Lauren Simmons (USA)	2:12.17	16	

== See also ==
- 2003 World Championships in Athletics – Women's 800 metres
- Athletics at the 2004 Summer Olympics – Women's 800 metres
