= Rosibel García =

Colombian middle-distance runner (born 1981)

Personal information
- Full name: Rosibel García Mina
- Born: 13 February 1981 (age 45) Jamundí, Valle del Cauca, Colombia
- Height: 1.67 m (5 ft 6 in)
- Weight: 52 kg (115 lb)

Sport
- Country: Colombia
- Sport: Women's Athletics
- Event: Middle-distance running
Medal record
Women's athletics
Representing Colombia
Pan American Games
| Silver medal – second place | 2007 Rio de Janeiro | 800 m |
| Silver medal – second place | 2011 Guadalajara | 1500 m |
| Bronze medal – third place | 2007 Rio de Janeiro | 1500 m |
| Bronze medal – third place | 2011 Guadalajara | 800 m |
Bolivarian Games
| Gold medal – first place | 2005 Armenia | 800 m |
| Gold medal – first place | 2005 Armenia | 1500 m |
| Gold medal – first place | 2005 Armenia | 4x400 m relay |
| Gold medal – first place | 2009 Sucre | 800 m |
| Gold medal – first place | 2009 Sucre | 1500 m |
| Silver medal – second place | 2001 Ambato | 800 m |
South American Championships
| Gold medal – first place | 2005 Cali | 800 m |
| Gold medal – first place | 2005 Cali | 1500 m |
| Gold medal – first place | 2007 Montevideo | 1500 m |
| Gold medal – first place | 2009 Lima | 800 m |
| Gold medal – first place | 2009 Lima | 1500 m |
| Gold medal – first place | 2011 Buenos Aires | 800 m |
| Gold medal – first place | 2011 Buenos Aires | 1500 m |
| Silver medal – second place | 2005 Cali | 4×400 m relay |
| Bronze medal – third place | 2003 Barquisimeto | 800 m |
| Bronze medal – third place | 2003 Barquisimeto | 4×400 m relay |
- Updated on 12 June 2014

Rosibel García Mina (born 13 February 1981) is a Colombian track and field athlete who specialises in middle-distance running events. She has represented her country at the Summer Olympics and has also competed at the World Championships in Athletics.

She is the current Colombian record holder for the 800 metres and former 1500 metres record holder. The 800 m record was set at the 2008 Beijing Olympics, where she became the first Colombian woman ever to reach the semi-finals of the event. She was one of South America's foremost female middle-distance runners in the first decade of the 21st century, having been a three-time South American Champion in the 1500 m and a two-time champion over 800 m. In addition to the medals she has won at the Bolivarian Games and various Central American competitions, she won a silver and bronze medal at the 2007 Pan American Games.

== Career ==
Born in Jamundí, Valle del Cauca, Colombia, she began her international career with a bronze medal in the 800 metres at the 1999 South American Junior Championships. She competed on the world stage the year after, reaching the semi-finals of the 400 metres at the 2000 World Junior Championships in Athletics. Her first senior medal was an 800 m silver at the 2001 Bolivarian Games. Soon after she was achieving medals at the continental level: after an 800 m bronze at the 2003 South American Championships in Athletics, she helped the Colombian women's 4×400 metres relay team to win a second bronze with veteran Mirtha Brock. García made her first appearance at the Pan American Games that year, finishing thirteenth in the women's 800 m final.

She reached new heights on home turf in 2005. First, at the 2005 South American Championships in Athletics in Cali in July, she scored an 800 m and 1500 metres double continental gold, as well as winning the 4×400 m relay silver medal. The following month she competed at the 2005 Bolivarian Games (staged in the Colombian department of Armenia) and took an even greater haul: again winning in the 800 and 1500 m races, but this time leading the relay team to the gold medal.

At the 2006 Ibero-American Championships García set a new Colombian record of 2:01.62 in the 800 m, winning the gold in the process, and also won a silver with the relay team. She attended the Central American and Caribbean Games, taking the 800 m silver behind the 2005 world champion Zulia Calatayud and setting a new Games record of 4:18.29 for the 1500 m gold.

She took part in three major events in 2007. The first event was the 2007 South American Championships in Athletics, where she was set to defend her titles. She was leading in the 800 m race, but in the last fifty metres of the race she fell and did not manage to make the podium. Such problems did not arise in the 1500 m race, where she beat the newly crowned 800 m champion, Marian Burnett, to the gold medal. García represented Colombia for a second time at the 2007 Pan American Games. She won the 800 m silver (finishing ahead of Calatayud) and broke the national record in the 1500 m, finishing in 4:15.78, to take a bronze medal three days later. After this, she was selected to take part in her first World Championships in Athletics. However, she did not progress beyond the heats stage of the 800 m competition at the 2007 World Championships in Athletics.

The next season was more successful for her at the major competitions. She was once again dominant at regional level, taking two golds at the 2008 Central American and Caribbean Championships. She was also entered into her first Summer Olympics – gaining selection to compete in the 800 m Olympic race. She finished second in her heat and progressed to the semi-finals of the competition, becoming the first ever Colombian woman to progress that far in the event. She finished fifth in the semi-finals, setting a new national record of 1:59.38 – this was the best performance by a South American in the event at the 2008 Olympics.

At the 2009 South American Championships in Athletics she became both the 800 m and 1500 m champion again. She ran in the women's 800 race at the 2009 World Championships in Athletics, but as had happened two years before, she did not get beyond the heats (just beaten to the qualification spot by Kenia Sinclair).

== Personal bests ==
| Event | Time (min:sec) | Venue | Date |
|---|---|---|---|
| 400 m | 53.46 | Bogotá, Colombia | 24 May 2003 |
| 800 m | 1:59.38 NR | Beijing, China | 16 August 2008 |
| 1500 m | 4:09.75 | Trujillo, Peru | 26 November 2013 |

- All information taken from IAAF profile.

== Competition record ==
| Year | Competition | Venue | Position | Event | Notes |
Representing Colombia
| 1998 | South American Junior Championships | Córdoba, Argentina | — | 200 m | DNF |
| 1998 | South American Junior Championships | Córdoba, Argentina | 4th | 400 m | 57.17 |
| 1998 | South American Junior Championships | Córdoba, Argentina | 2nd | 4 × 100 m relay | 47.27 |
| 1998 | South American Junior Championships | Córdoba, Argentina | 2nd | 4 × 400 m relay | 3:51.30 |
| 1999 | Pan American Junior Championships | Tampa, United States | 4th | 4 × 100 m relay | 46.17 |
| 1999 | South American Junior Championships | Concepción, Chile | 3rd | 800 m | 2:07.56 |
| 1999 | South American Junior Championships | Concepción, Chile | 1st | 4 × 400 m relay | 3:44.40 |
| 2000 | World Junior Championships | Santiago, Chile | 16th (sf) | 400m | 56.09 |
| 2000 | World Junior Championships | Santiago, Chile | — | 4 × 400 m relay | DQ |
| 2001 | South American Championships | Manaus, Brazil | 4th | 800 m | 2:07.42 |
| 2001 | South American Championships | Manaus, Brazil | 2nd | 4 × 400 m relay | 3:40.27 |
| 2001 | Bolivarian Games | Ambato, Ecuador | 2nd | 800 m | 2:08.97 A |
| 2003 | South American Championships | Barquisimeto, Venezuela | 3rd | 800 m | 2:02.84 |
| 2003 | South American Championships | Barquisimeto, Venezuela | 3rd | 4 × 400 m relay | 3:41.05 |
| 2003 | Pan American Games | Santo Domingo, Dominican Republic | 13th (h) | 800 m | 2:08.08 |
| 2004 | Ibero-American Championships | Huelva, Spain | 6th | 800 m | 2:04.07 |
| 2004 | Ibero-American Championships | Huelva, Spain | 3rd | 4 × 400 m relay | 3:33.95 |
| 2005 | South American Championships | Cali, Colombia | 1st | 800 m | 2:03.28 |
| 2005 | South American Championships | Cali, Colombia | 1st | 1500 m | 4:29.63 |
| 2005 | South American Championships | Cali, Colombia | 2nd | 4 × 400 m relay | 3:36.95 |
| 2005 | Bolivarian Games | Armenia, Colombia | 1st | 800 m | 2:01.57 GR A |
| 2005 | Bolivarian Games | Armenia, Colombia | 1st | 1500 m | 4:29.16 A |
| 2005 | Bolivarian Games | Armenia, Colombia | 1st | 4 × 400 m relay | 3:35.25 GR A |
| 2006 | Ibero-American Championships | Ponce Puerto Rico | 1st | 800 m | 2:01.62 (NR) |
| 2006 | Ibero-American Championships | Ponce Puerto Rico | 2nd | 4 × 400 m relay | 3:37.71 |
| 2006 | Central American and Caribbean Games | Cartagena, Colombia | 2nd | 800 m | 2:05.78 |
| 2006 | Central American and Caribbean Games | Cartagena, Colombia | 1st | 1500 m | 4:18.29 GR |
| 2006 | Central American and Caribbean Games | Cartagena, Colombia | 5th | 4 × 400 m relay | 3:41.42 |
| 2007 | South American Championships | São Paulo, Brazil | — | 800 m | DNF |
| 2007 | South American Championships | São Paulo, Brazil | 1st | 1500 m | 4:20.36 |
| 2007 | South American Championships | São Paulo, Brazil | 2nd | 4 × 400 m relay | 3:43.52 |
| 2007 | Pan American Games | Rio de Janeiro, Brazil | 2nd | 800 m | 2:00.02 |
| 2007 | Pan American Games | Rio de Janeiro, Brazil | 3rd | 1500 m | 4:15.78 (NR) |
| 2007 | World Championships | Osaka, Japan | 32nd (h) | 800 m | 2:02.86 |
| 2008 | Central American and Caribbean Championships | Cali, Colombia | 1st | 800 m | 2:05.9 |
| 2008 | Central American and Caribbean Championships | Cali, Colombia | 1st | 1500 m | 4:24.62 |
| 2008 | Summer Olympics | Beijing, China | 14th (sf) | 800 m | 1:59.38 (NR) |
| 2009 | South American Championships | Lima, Peru | 1st | 800 m | 2:05.21 |
| 2009 | South American Championships | Lima, Peru | 1st | 1500 m | 4:20.30 |
| 2009 | World Championships | Berlin, Germany | 29th (h) | 800 m | 2:04.73 |
| 2009 | Bolivarian Games | Sucre, Bolivia | 1st | 800 m | 2:10.00 A |
| 2009 | Bolivarian Games | Sucre, Bolivia | 1st | 1500 m | 4:45.66 A |
| 2010 | Central American and Caribbean Games | Mayagüez, Puerto Rico | 1st | 800 m | 2:03.77 |
| 2010 | Central American and Caribbean Games | Mayagüez, Puerto Rico | 1st | 1500 m | 4:21.17 |
| 2011 | South American Championships | Buenos Aires, Argentina | 1st | 800 m | 2:04.76 |
| 2011 | South American Championships | Buenos Aires, Argentina | 1st | 1500 m | 4:22.18 |
| 2011 | World Championships | Daegu, South Korea | 14th (sf) | 800 m | 2:00.79 |
| 2011 | Pan American Games | Guadalajara, Mexico | 3rd | 800 m | 2:04.45 |
| 2011 | Pan American Games | Guadalajara, Mexico | 2nd | 1500 m | 4:26.78 |
| 2012 | Ibero-American Championships | Barquisimeto, Venezuela | 1st | 800 m | 2:03.00 |
| 2012 | Olympic Games | London, United Kingdom | 12th (sf) | 800 m | 2:00.16 |
| 2013 | South American Championships | Cartagena, Colombia | 1st | 800 m | 2:02.45 |
| 2013 | South American Championships | Cartagena, Colombia | 1st | 1500 m | 4:15.84 |
| 2013 | South American Championships | Cartagena, Colombia | 2nd | 4 × 400 m relay | :36.29 |
| 2013 | Bolivarian Games | Trujillo, Peru | 1st | 800 m | 2:01.98 |
| 2013 | Bolivarian Games | Trujillo, Peru | 1st | 1500 m | 4:09.75 |
| 2013 | Bolivarian Games | Trujillo, Peru | 1st | 4 × 400 m relay | 3:34.35 |
| 2016 | Ibero-American Championships | Rio de Janeiro, Brazil | 1st | 800 m | 2:07.06 |
| 2017 | South American Championships | Asunción, Paraguay | 2nd | 1500 m | 4:21.81 |
| 2017 | Bolivarian Games | Santa Marta, Colombia | 2nd | 1500 m | 4:18.35 |
| 2018 | South American Games | Cochabamba, Bolivia | 5th | 1500 m | 4:40.25 |
| 2018 | Central American and Caribbean Games | Barranquilla, Colombia | 3rd | 1500 m | 4:23.43 |
| 2018 | Ibero-American Championships | Trujillo, Peru | 7th | 1500 m | 4:38.21 |
| 2019 | South American Championships | Lima, Peru | 5th | 1500 m | 4:29.81 |

- She is also a multiple Colombian national champion, having won the 800 m and 1500 m titles a number of times, as well as the 400 metres and 400 metres hurdles races in 2001.
