= 1997 South American Junior Championships in Athletics =

XXIX South American Junior Championships in Athletics
- Dates: June 20–21
- Host city: San Carlos, Uruguay
- Level: Junior
- Events: 43
- Participation: about 302 athletes from 11 nations

The 29th South American Junior Championships in Athletics were held in San Carlos, Uruguay from June 20–21, 1997.

== Participation (unofficial) ==
Detailed result lists are available on the "World Junior Athletics History" website. An unofficial count yields the number of about 302 athletes from 11 countries: Argentina (59), Bolivia (3), Brazil (65), Chile (32), Colombia (21), Ecuador (22), Panama (1), Paraguay (22), Peru (15), Uruguay (38), Venezuela (24).

== Medal summary ==
Medal winners are published for men and women Complete results can be found on the "World Junior Athletics History" website.

=== Men ===
Event	Gold		Silver		Bronze	
100 metres	Martín Cortese (ARG)	11.03	Heber Viera (URU)	11.04	Evandro Tristão (BRA)	11.14
200 metres	Heber Viera (URU)	21.57	José Luis Herrera (COL)	21.80	Daniel Toledo (BRA)	21.81
400 metres	Damián Spector (ARG)	47.80	William Hernández (VEN)	48.52	Vicente Erut (ARG)	48.70
800 metres	John Chávez (COL)	1:54.97	Glauco da Silva (BRA)	1:55.52	Carlos Márquez (VEN)	1:56.01
1500 metres	Cristián Rosales (URU)	3:52.13	Juan Carlos de Bastos (ARG)	3:52.14	John Chávez (COL)	3:54.90
5000 metres	Cristián Rosales (URU)	14:23.32	Edegar Lobo (BRA)	14:25.75	Leonardo da Silva (BRA)	14:40.15
10,000 metres	Lervis Arias (VEN)	30:24.20	Jonathan Matos (BRA)	30:32.04	Gustavo Pereira (URU)	31:15.78
110 metres hurdles	Rodrigo Palladino (BRA)	14.59	Paulo Villar (COL)	15.39	Pablo Sandoval (CHI)	15.43
400 metres hurdles	Adriano Maia (BRA)	53.01	Robson dos Santos (BRA)	53.46	Paulo Villar (COL)	55.74
3000 metres steeplechase	Juan Carlos de Bastos (ARG)	9:05.93	Sebastián González Cabot (ARG)	9:12.70	Damião de Melo (BRA)	9:16.06
4 × 100 metres relay	Brazil; Gabriel Malateaux; Jarbas Mascarenhas; Daniel Toledo; Evandro de Tristão	41.70	Argentina; Federico Silvestri; Damian Spector; Vicente Erut; Martín Cortese	41.86	Uruguay; La Rosa; José Daniel García; Pablo Amaral; Heber Viera	42.58
4 × 400 metres relay	Argentina; Martín Cortese; Gaston Patiño; Vicente Erut; Damian Spector	3:13.29	Brazil; Evandro de Tristão; Glauco Santos; Amauri dos Santos; Adriano Maia	3:14.30	Venezuela; Alcides Barrios; Helly Ollarves; Carlos Márquez; William Hernández	3:17.21
10,000 metres track walk	Román Criollo (ECU)	44:20.95	Geovanny Quinche (ECU)	44:43.17	Raomir Hernández (VEN)	45:11.96
High jump	Fabrício Romero (BRA)	2.09	Alfredo Deza (PER)	2.06	Wagner Príncipe (BRA)	2.06
Pole vault	Cristian Aguirre (ARG)	4.65	Juan Maronese (ARG)	4.60	Gustavo Rehder (BRA)	4.55
Long jump	Pablo Quiroga (CHI)	7.15w	Jefferson Lopes (BRA)	7.02w	Felipe Soto (COL)	7.01w
Triple jump	Jefferson Lopes (BRA)	15.26	Johnny Rodríguez (VEN)	14.98	Alvin Rentería (COL)	14.84
Shot put	Ronny Jiménez (VEN)	16.14	Jhonny Rodríguez (COL)	16.02	Andrés Calvo (ARG)	15.84
Discus throw	Andrés Calvo (ARG)	49.60	Hernán Vázquez (ARG)	48.68	Julián Angulo (COL)	46.54
Hammer throw	Cristian Fernández (ARG)	56.40	Juan Palacios (ARG)	52.02	Luis Prieto (VEN)	46.68
Javelin throw	Edwin Cuesta (VEN)	64.58	Adriano Vitorino (BRA)	62.84	Philip Delard (CHI)	59.20
Decathlon	Édson Bindilatti (BRA)	6561	Santiago Lorenzo (ARG)	6508	Alejo Kerwitz (ARG)	6151

=== Women ===
Event	Gold		Silver		Bronze	
100 metres	Mary Vázquez (COL)	12.36	Juliana Pereira (BRA)	12.41	Ana Mariuxi Caicedo (ECU)	12.46
200 metres	Juliana Pereira (BRA)	24.52	Mary Vázquez (COL)	24.82	Vanesa de Oliveira (BRA)	25.41
400 metres	Josiane Tito (BRA)	55.68	Ana Paula Pereira (BRA)	56.37	Norbelis Bracho (VEN)	56.59
800 metres	Josiane Tito (BRA)	2:09.25	Christiane dos Santos (BRA)	2:09.92	Faustina Huamaní (PER)	2:11.77
1500 metres	Faustina Huamaní (PER)	4:32.1	Bertha Sánchez (COL)	4:32.5	Fabiani da Silva (BRA)	4:34.2
3000 metres	Bertha Sánchez (COL)	9:56.15	María Paredes (ECU)	9:57.31	Valquíria dos Santos (BRA)	9:58.43
5000 metres	Bertha Sánchez (COL)	16:57.53	María Paredes (ECU)	17:02.42	Lucélia Peres (BRA)	17:03.10
100 metres hurdles	Kelly Ribeiro de Oliveira (BRA)	14.34	Cora Olivero (ARG)	14.70	Patrícia de Souza (BRA)	14.71
400 metres hurdles	Ana Paula Pereira (BRA)	59.93	Karina Soto (URU)	60.91	Rúbia dos Santos (BRA)	61.11
4 × 100 metres relay	Brazil; Josiane Tito; Vanesa de Oliveira; Kelly de Oliveira; Juliana Pereira	47.26	Colombia; Yorly Lasso; Mary Vázquez; Sandra Espinosa; Zuly Campo	48.20	Argentina; Silvana Gómez; Cora Olivero; Laura Torrecilla; Silvana Belfiglio	48.95
4 × 400 metres relay	Brazil; Christiane dos Santos; Ana Pereira; Juliana Pereira; Josiane Tito	3:44.11	Colombia; Melisa Murillo; Sandra Espinosa; Sira Córdoba; Mary Vázquez	3:52.25	Uruguay; Florencia Ledesma; Macarena Darias; María da Silveira; Karina Soto	3:53.03
5000 metres track walk	Gladys Criollo (ECU)	24:15.19	Luisa Paltín (ECU)	24:22.53	Mayra Sosa (VEN)	24:54.06
High jump	Delfina Blaquier (ARG)	1.77	Eliana da Silva (BRA)	1.74	Glaucia da Silva (BRA)	1.74
Pole vault	Déborah Gyurcsek (URU)	3.60	Miriam Schwuchow (BRA)	3.10	Carolina González (CHI)	3.10
Long jump	Gisele de Oliveira (BRA)	5.74	Yorly Lasso (COL)	5.71	Edilene Ferreira (BRA)	5.66
Triple jump	Edilene Ferreira (BRA)	12.26	Gisele de Oliveira (BRA)	12.14	Silvina Boretto (ARG)	12.09
Shot put	Luz Dary Castro (COL)	13.63	Vânia Kolonko (BRA)	13.11	Ana Borregales (VEN)	12.98
Discus throw	María Cubillán (VEN)	42.66	Luz Dary Castro (COL)	41.86	Maria Alexandre (BRA)	40.44
Hammer throw	Anabell Gómez (VEN)	46.00	Dubraska Rodríguez (VEN)	44.06	Romina Toulemonde (ARG)	42.26
Javelin throw	Xiolimar Carolina Castillo (VEN)	46.34	Valeria do Nascimento (BRA)	42.82	Cristina Dia (BRA)	41.64
Heptathlon	Gladibeth Morles (VEN)	4647	María Fernanda Dilascio (ARG)	4547	Ellen Marinho (BRA)	4499

== Medal table (unofficial) ==
* Host nation (Uruguay)

Rank	Nation	Gold	Silver	Bronze	Total
1	Brazil	15	15	17	47
2	Argentina	8	9	6	23
3	Venezuela	7	3	7	17
4	Colombia	5	9	5	19
5	Uruguay*	4	2	3	9
6	Ecuador	2	4	1	7
7	Peru	1	1	1	3
8	Chile	1	0	3	4
Totals (8 entries)		43	43	43	129
