= 1998 South American Junior Championships in Athletics =

XXX South American Junior Championships in Athletics
- Dates: May 16–17
- Host city: Córdoba, Argentina
- Level: Junior
- Events: 43
- Participation: about 286 athletes from 11 nations

The 30th South American Junior Championships in Athletics were held in Córdoba, Argentina from May 16–17, 1998.

== Participation (unofficial) ==
Detailed result lists can be found on the "World Junior Athletics History" website. An unofficial count yields the number of about 286 athletes from about 11 countries: Argentina (66), Bolivia (12), Brazil (68), Chile (46), Colombia (24), Ecuador (15), Panama (3), Paraguay (4), Peru (9), Uruguay (15), Venezuela (24).

== Medal summary ==
Medal winners are published for men and women Complete results can be found on the "World Junior Athletics History" website.

=== Men ===
Event	Gold		Silver		Bronze	
100 metres	Jarbas Mascarenhas (BRA)	10.59	José Luis Herrera (COL)	10.73	Gabriel Malateaux (BRA)	10.74
200 metres	Heber Viera (URU)	21.33w	Jarbas Mascarenhas (BRA)	21.45w	Helly Ollarves (VEN)	21.60w
400 metres	William Hernández (VEN)	47.57	Damián Spector (ARG)	47.58	Vicente Erut (ARG)	47.81
800 metres	Glauco da Silva (BRA)	1:50.78	Claudinei Vítor (BRA)	1:50.98	John Chávez (COL)	1:51.27
1500 metres	Glauco da Silva (BRA)	3:51.20	André da Silva (BRA)	3:52.17	Juan Carlos de Bastos (ARG)	3:55.68
5000 metres	Luiz Fernando Paula (BRA)	14:34.31	José Mansilla (ARG)	14:35.78	Gustavo Pereira (URU)	14:45.39
10,000 metres	Javier Carriqueo (ARG)	31:06.83	Karin Marín (CHI)	31:08.07	Luiz Fernando Paula (BRA)	31:15.08
110 metres hurdles	Robson dos Santos (BRA)	14.40	Frederick Jezini (BRA)	14.67	Jackson Quiñónez (ECU)	14.78
400 metres hurdles	Robson dos Santos (BRA)	51.90	Wendell Colares (BRA)	52.21	José Moncada (VEN)	52.82
3000 metres steeplechase	Juan Carlos de Bastos (ARG)	9:07.29	Marcos Silva (URU)	9:08.42	Oscar Meza (PAR)	9:14.65
4 × 100 metres relay	Brazil; Gabriel Malateaux; Evandro de Tristão; Julio Alf; Jarbas Mascarenhas	40.93	Venezuela; Víctor Castillo; Luis Parra; José Peña; Helly Ollarves	41.41	Chile; Cristián Labra; Felipe Castillo; Rodrigo Díaz; Pablo Quiroga	42.00
4 × 400 metres relay	Brazil; Marcos Pinto; Wendell Colares; Marco Barbosa; Amauri dos Santos	3:14.79	Colombia; Irne Carabali; Jhon Chávez; Edwin Martínez; Jorge Chaverra	3:18.80	Venezuela; José Moncada; Dany Núñez; Helly Ollarves; William Hernández	3:20.06
10,000 metres track walk	Mário dos Santos (BRA)	42:14.02	Luis Fernando López (COL)	44:18.66	Román Criollo (ECU)	44:33.46
High jump	Alfredo Deza (PER)	2.23	José Cáceras (PER)	2.08	Wagner Príncipe (BRA)	2.08
Pole vault	Gustavo Rehder (BRA)	5.00	Marcelo Terra (ARG)	4.60	Cristóbal Zegers (CHI)	4.50
Long jump	Esteban Copland (VEN)	7.71	Pablo Quiroga (CHI)	7.18	Luciano Silva (BRA)	7.10
Triple jump	Esteban Copland (VEN)	15.35	Jorge Palacios (COL)	15.18	Marcelo da Costa (BRA)	14.98
Shot put	Jhonny Rodríguez (COL)	16.62	Ronny Jiménez (VEN)	16.52	Jeberton Fermino (BRA)	15.34
Discus throw	Julián Angulo (COL)	50.81	Fernando Cornejo (PER)	47.51	Rodrigo dos Santos (BRA)	45.32
Hammer throw	Cristian Fernández (ARG)	57.93	Juan Palacios (ARG)	54.05	Luis Prieto (VEN)	51.36
Javelin throw	Edwin Cuesta (VEN)	69.68	João Carlos Martins (BRA)	64.60	Tomas Kubler (CHI)	60.19
Decathlon	Édson Bindilatti (BRA)	7158	Enrique Aguirre (ARG)	6669	Camilo Aguirre (ARG)	6199

=== Women ===
Event	Gold		Silver		Bronze	
100 metres	Ana Mariuxi Caicedo (ECU)	11.96	Daniela Pavez (CHI)	11.99	Paula Osorio (CHI)	12.04
200 metres	Norma González (COL)	24.16	Paula Osorio (CHI)	24.31	Sandra Reátegui (PER)	24.46
400 metres	Josiane Tito (BRA)	54.19	Norma González (COL)	54.47	Silvania Oliveira (BRA)	56.04
800 metres	Josiane Tito (BRA)	2:10.37	Christiane dos Santos (BRA)	2:12.73	Diana Urrego (COL)	2:14.93
1500 metres	Anahí Soto (CHI)	4:35.07	Mónica Amboya (ECU)	4:37.73	Vanesa Maraviglia (ARG)	4:39.20
3000 metres	María Paredes (ECU)	9:52.06	Vanesa Maraviglia (ARG)	9:55.44	Michelle Costa (BRA)	9:56.01
5000 metres	Lucélia Peres (BRA)	17:01.28	María Paredes (ECU)	17:07.27	Valquíria dos Santos (BRA)	17:59.89
100 metres hurdles	Francisca Guzmán (CHI)	14.16	Rúbia dos Santos (BRA)	14.33	Maíla Machado (BRA)	14.57
400 metres hurdles	Isabel Silva (BRA)	59.99	Rúbia dos Santos (BRA)	61.83	Sira Córdoba (COL)	62.25
4 × 100 metres relay	Chile; Fabiola Hecht; Paula Osorio; Daniela Pávez; María José Echeverría	47.02	Colombia; Norma González; Rosibel García; Miryam Caicedo; Sira Córdoba	47.27	Brazil; Melissa Freire; Thatiana Ignâcio; Isabel Silva; Priscila da Silva	47.50
4 × 400 metres relay	Brazil; Rúbia dos Santos; Christiane dos Santos; Isabel Silva; Josiane Tito	3:46.79	Colombia; Norma González; Rosibel García; Miryam Caicedo; Sira Córdoba	3:51.30	Chile; María Praderas; Magdalena Sánchez; María José Echeverría; Anahí Soto	3:55.16
5000 metres track walk	Luisa Paltín (ECU)	24:08.50	Mónica Carrión (ECU)	24:24.41	Andreia Pedro (BRA)	24:43.81
High jump	Delfina Blaquier (ARG)	1.70	Danielle Sedrez (BRA)	1.65	Lilian Magalhães (BRA)	1.60
Pole vault	Fabiana Murer (BRA)	3.52	Carolina González (CHI)	3.30	Joana Costa (BRA)	3.25
Long jump	Gisele de Oliveira (BRA)	6.16	Vanina Bernardo (ARG)	5.96	Ana Mariuxi Caicedo (ECU)	5.74
Triple jump	Gisele de Oliveira (BRA)	12.74	Emilis Guerra (VEN)	12.39	Jennifer Arveláez (VEN)	12.31
Shot put	Fernanda Resende (BRA)	13.55	Vânia Kolonko (BRA)	13.22	Leomelina Blandón (COL)	13.04
Discus throw	Leomelina Blandón (COL)	45.95	María Cubillán (VEN)	44.11	Fabiana Alexandre (BRA)	41.98
Hammer throw	Anabell Gómez (VEN)	48.41	Catalina Farías (CHI)	47.59	Dubraska Rodríguez (VEN)	47.43
Javelin throw	María Laura Sánchez (ARG)	45.82	Daniela Massoli (CHI)	43.95	Roxana Fernández (ARG)	42.71
Heptathlon	María Fernanda Dilascio (ARG)	4809	Valeria Steffens (CHI)	4615	Adriana da Costa (BRA)	4363

== Medal table (unofficial) ==
* Host nation (Argentina)

Rank	Nation	Gold	Silver	Bronze	Total
1	Brazil	20	11	17	48
2	Argentina*	6	7	5	18
3	Venezuela	5	4	6	15
4	Colombia	4	7	4	15
5	Chile	3	8	5	16
6	Ecuador	3	3	3	9
7	Peru	1	2	1	4
8	Uruguay	1	1	1	3
9	Paraguay	0	0	1	1
Totals (9 entries)		43	43	43	129
