= Athletics at the 2007 Pan American Games – Women's 800 metres =

Women's 800 metres at the Pan American Games

The women's 800 metres event at the 2007 Pan American Games was held on July 23–24.

== Medalists ==
| Gold | Silver | Bronze |
|---|---|---|
| Diane Cummins; Canada | Rosibel García; Colombia | Zulia Calatayud; Cuba |

== Results ==
=== Heats ===
Qualification: First 3 of each heat (Q) and the next 2 fastest (q) qualified for the final.

| Rank | Heat | Name | Nationality | Time | Notes |
|---|---|---|---|---|---|
| 1 | 2 | Josiane Tito | Brazil | 2:01.28 | Q, PB |
| 2 | 2 | Alysia Johnson | United States | 2:01.48 | Q |
| 3 | 2 | Rosibel García | Colombia | 2:01.60 | Q |
| 4 | 2 | Ysanne Williams | Jamaica | 2:02.49 | q |
| 5 | 2 | Melissa de Leon | Trinidad and Tobago | 2:02.72 | q, SB |
| 6 | 1 | Diane Cummins | Canada | 2:02.80 | Q |
| 7 | 1 | Zulia Calatayud | Cuba | 2:03.00 | Q |
| 8 | 1 | Marian Burnett | Guyana | 2:03.09 | Q |
| 9 | 2 | Ana Hachy Peña | Cuba | 2:03.29 | PB |
| 10 | 1 | Juliana Paula dos Santos | Brazil | 2:03.66 | |
| 11 | 1 | Morgan Uceny | United States | 2:04.13 | |
| 12 | 1 | Lysaira del Valle | Puerto Rico | 2:05.15 | |
| 13 | 1 | Sheena Gooding | Barbados | 2:07.93 | |
| | 2 | Kenia Sinclair | Jamaica | DNS | |

=== Final ===
| Rank | Name | Nationality | Time | Notes |
|---|---|---|---|---|
| 1st place, gold medalist(s) | Diane Cummins | Canada | 1:59.75 | SB |
| 2nd place, silver medalist(s) | Rosibel García | Colombia | 2:00.02 | SB |
| 3rd place, bronze medalist(s) | Zulia Calatayud | Cuba | 2:00.34 | SB |
| 4 | Marian Burnett | Guyana | 2:00.40 | |
| 5 | Josiane Tito | Brazil | 2:01.41 | |
| 6 | Alysia Johnson | United States | 2:02.57 | |
| 7 | Ysanne Williams | Jamaica | 2:03.18 | |
| 8 | Melissa de Leon | Trinidad and Tobago | 2:03.63 | |
