= Athletics at the 2011 Pan American Games – Women's 800 metres =

Women's 800 metres at the 2011 Pan American Games
- Venue: Telmex Athletics Stadium
- Dates: October 25
- Competitors: 9 from 7 nations

Medalists
Gold medal	Adriana Muñoz	Cuba
Silver medal	Gabriela Medina	Mexico
Bronze medal	Rosibel García	Colombia

The women's 800 metres sprint competition of the athletics events at the 2011 Pan American Games took on the 25 of October at the Telmex Athletics Stadium. The defending Pan American Games champion was Diane Cummins of Canada.

== Records ==
Prior to this competition, the existing world and Pan American Games records were as follows:

World record	Jarmila Kratochvilova (CZE)	1:53.28	Munich, Germany	July 26, 1983
Pan American Games record	Ana Quirot (CUB)	1:58.71	Havana, Cuba	August 8, 1991

== Qualification ==
Each National Olympic Committee (NOC) was able to enter one athlete regardless if they had met the qualification standard. To enter two entrants both athletes had to have met the minimum standard (2:07.00) in the qualifying period (January 1, 2010 to September 14, 2011).

== Schedule ==
Date	Time	Round
October 25, 2011	17:15	Final

== Results ==
All times shown are in seconds.

KEY:	q	Fastest non-qualifiers	Q	Qualified	NR	National record	PB	Personal best	SB	Seasonal best	DQ	Disqualified

=== Final ===
Held on October 25

Rank	Name	Nationality	Time	Notes
1st place, gold medalist(s)	Adriana Muñoz	Cuba	2:04.08	
2nd place, silver medalist(s)	Gabriela Medina	Mexico	2:04.41	SB
3rd place, bronze medalist(s)	Rosibel García	Colombia	2:04.45	
4	Rose Mary Almanza	Cuba	2:04.82	
5	Christiane dos Santos	Brazil	2:06.15	
6	Heather Kampf	United States	2:07.11	
7	Christina Rodgers	United States	2:08.29	
8	Nancy Gallo	Argentina	2:09.10	PB
9	Daisy Cecilia Ugarte	Bolivia	2:16.94	
