= 2007 South American Championships in Athletics =

45th South American Championships
- Dates: 7 June – 9 June
- Host city: São Paulo, Brazil
- Venue: Estádio Ícaro de Castro Mello
- Level: Senior
- Events: 44
- Participation: At least 249 athletes from 13 nations
- Records set: 7 Championship records 2 Area records

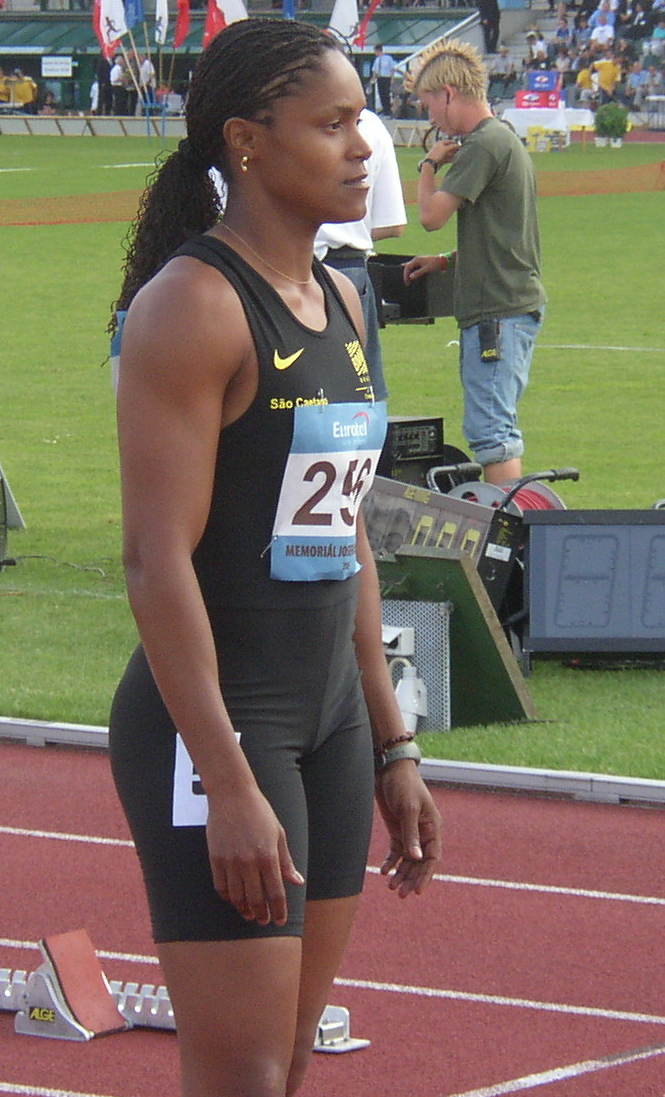
Lucimar de Moura (above) won triple gold at the championships

The 2007 South American Championships in Athletics were held at the Estádio Ícaro de Castro Mello in São Paulo, Brazil from 7 June to 9 June 2007. A total of 44 events were contested, of which 22 were by male and 22 by female athletes. Continuing in their traditional dominant role, the hosts Brazil easily topped both the medal and points tables, having won 28 gold medals and 61 medals in total. The next best team was Colombia who had a haul of seven golds and 26 overall, while Argentina took third with 13 medals of which 4 were gold.

In addition to the seven Championship records which were broken during the three-day event, two South American records were broken: Keila Costa jumped 14.57 m in the women's triple jump. In comparison, Fábio Gomes da Silva broke the men's pole vault record with a clearance of 5.77 m. A total of thirteen national records in athletics were broken by medal winning athletes.

Lucimar de Moura of Brazil was the stand out performer in the medals, winning the 100/200 metres double before taking the national team to a gold in the 4×100 metres relay. Felipa Palacios of Colombia took three silver medals in the same events, finishing behind de Moura each time, and also won silver in the 4×400 metres relay. Germán Lauro won both the men's shot put and discus throw events while Elisângela Adriano completed the same feat on the women's side. Hugo Chila won silver in the long jump and triple jump, and Keila Costa scored a long jump silver as well as her triple jump gold. In one of the more dramatic moments of the championships, Rosibel García looked set to complete an 800/1500 metres double but she fell in the last 50 m of the 800 m race, allowing 1500 m silver medallist Marian Burnett of Guyana to win the gold.

== Records ==
| Name | Event | Country | Record | Type |
|---|---|---|---|---|
| Javier Guarín | 5000 metres | Colombia | 13:51.19 | CR |
| Fábio Gomes da Silva | Pole vault | Brazil | 5.77 m | CR AR |
| Zenaide Vieira | 3000 metres steeplechase | Brazil | 10:07.93 | CR |
| Sandra Zapata | 20,000 metres track walk | Colombia | 1:37:46.0 | CR |
| Fabiana Murer | Pole vault | Brazil | 4.50 m | CR |
| Keila Costa | Triple jump | Brazil | 14.57 m | CR AR |
| Lucimara da Silva | Heptathlon | Brazil | 5803 pts | CR |
Key:WR — World record • AR — Area record • CR — Championship record • NR — National record. In addition, 15 national records were set.

== Medal summary ==
=== Men ===
| Event | Gold | | Silver | | Bronze | |
|---|---|---|---|---|---|---|
| 100 metres | Vicente de Lima (BRA) | 10.36 | Franklin Nazareno (ECU) | 10.37 | Álvaro Gómez (COL) | 10.66 |
| 200 metres | Sandro Viana (BRA) | 20.54 | Heber Viera (URU) | 20.59 | Daniel Grueso (COL) | 20.66 NR |
| 400 metres | Andrés Silva (URU) | 45.89 | Rodrigo Bargas (BRA) | 46.15 | Fernando de Almeida (BRA) | 46.38 |
| 800 metres | Kléberson Davide (BRA) | 1:49.61 | Gustavo Aguirre (ARG) | 1:49.98 | André de Santana (BRA) | 1:50.10 |
| 1500 metres | Byron Piedra (ECU) | 3:42.53 | Leandro de Oliveira (BRA) | 3:43.26 | Eduar Villanueva (VEN) | 3:43.40 |
| 5000 metres | Javier Guarín (COL) | 13:51.19 CR | Javier Carriqueo (ARG) | 13:55.37 | William Naranjo (COL) | 13:56.99 |
| 10,000 metres | Sérgio da Silva (BRA) | 29:57.80 | Ubiratan dos Santos (BRA) | 30:12.36 | Didimo Sánchez (VEN) | 31:15.30 |
| 110 metre hurdles | Anselmo da Silva (BRA) | 13.56 | Éder Antônio de Souza (BRA) | 13.58 | Francisco Castro (CHI) | 14.31 |
| 400 metre hurdles | Raphael Fernandes (BRA) | 49.81 | Maurício Teixeira (BRA) | 50.39 | José Céspedes (VEN) | 50.62 |
| 3000 metre steeplechase | Sergio Lobos (CHI) | 8:37.83 PB | Gládson Barbosa (BRA) | 8:43.69 | José Peña (VEN) | 8:54.43 |
| 4×100 metre relay | Brazil (BRA); Vicente de Lima; Nilson André; Basílio de Morães; Sandro Viana | 38.77 | Colombia (COL); Harlin Hechevarría; Yeimer Mosquera; Álvaro Gómez; Daniel Grueso | 39.80 | Argentina (ARG); José Manuel Garaventa; Mariano Jiménez; Miguel Wilken; Iván Altamirano | 39.91 NR |
| 4×400 metre relay | Brazil (BRA); Raphael Fernandes; Eduardo Vasconcelos; Rodrigo Bargas; Fernando de Almeida | 3:04.36 | Venezuela (VEN); José Céspedes; Simoncito Silvera; Wilmer Rivas; Josner Rodríguez | 3:05.88 | Panama (PAN); Jonathan Gibson; Anghelo Edmund; Andrés Rodríguez; Alonso Edward | 3:09.67 NR |
| 20,000 m track walk | James Rendón (COL) | 1:24:25.4 | Rolando Saquipay (ECU) | 1:25:55.2 | Juan Manuel Cano (ARG) | 1:28:28.5 |
| High jump | Jessé de Lima (BRA) | 2.24 m | Fábio Baptista (BRA) | 2.21 m | Gilmar Mayo (COL) | 2.21 m |
| Pole vault | Fábio Gomes da Silva (BRA) | 5.77 m CR AR | Germán Chiaraviglio (ARG) | 5.40 m | Javier Benítez (ARG); João Gabriel Sousa (BRA) | 5.20 m |
| Long jump | Rogério Bispo (BRA) | 7.94 m | Hugo Chila (ECU) | 7.81 m | Rodrigo de Araújo (BRA) | 7.77 m |
| Triple jump | Jefferson Dias Sabino (BRA) | 16.68 m | Hugo Chila (ECU) | 16.37 m | Leonardo Elisiário dos Santos (BRA) | 15.89 m |
| Shot put | Germán Lauro (ARG) | 19.65 m | Marco Antonio Verni (CHI) | 19.22 m | Yojer Medina (VEN) | 18.44 m |
| Discus throw | Germán Lauro (ARG) | 57.12 m | Ronald Julião (BRA) | 56.53 m | Julián Angulo (COL) | 54.68 m |
| Hammer throw | Juan Ignacio Cerra (ARG) | 72.96 m | Patricio Palma (CHI) | 66.56 m | Wagner Domingos (BRA) | 65.15 m |
| Javelin throw | Pablo Pietrobelli (ARG) | 76.52 m NR | Víctor Fatecha (PAR) | 75.95 m | Júlio César de Oliveira (BRA) | 74.56 m |
| Decathlon | Gonzalo Barroilhet (CHI) | 7504 pts NR | Danilo Mendes Xavier (BRA) | 7288 pts | Sinval de Oliveira (BRA) | 7243 pts |
WR world record | AR area record | CR championship record | GR games record | NR national record | OR Olympic record | PB personal best | SB season best | WL world leading (in a given season)

=== Women ===
| Event | Gold | | Silver | | Bronze | |
|---|---|---|---|---|---|---|
| 100 metres | Lucimar de Moura (BRA) | 11.20 | Felipa Palacios (COL) | 11.43 | Thaíssa Barbosa Presti (BRA) | 11.63 |
| 200 metres | Lucimar de Moura (BRA) | 23.00 | Felipa Palacios (COL) | 23.10 | Thaíssa Barbosa Presti (BRA) | 23.58 |
| 400 metres | Josiane Tito (BRA) | 52.67 | Sheila Ferreira (BRA) | 53.19 | Lucy Jaramillo (ECU) | 53.44 NR |
| 800 metres | Marian Burnett (GUY) | 2:03.57 | Muriel Coneo (COL) | 2:08.99 | Marcela Britos (URU) | 2:10.30 |
| 1500 metres | Rosibel García (COL) | 4:20.36 | Marian Burnett (GUY) | 4:20.69 NR | Zenaide Vieira (BRA) | 4:22.08 |
| 5000 metres | Ednalva Laureano da Silva (BRA) | 16:09.96 | Lucélia Peres (BRA) | 16:16.07 | Bertha Sánchez (COL) | 16:21.17 |
| 10,000 metres | Lucélia Peres (BRA) | 34:11.95 | Inés Melchor (PER) | 34:13.23 | Bertha Sánchez (COL) | 34:23.89 |
| 100 metre hurdles | Brigitte Merlano (COL) | 13.27 | Gilvaneide Parrela (BRA) | 13.40 | Lucimara da Silva (BRA) | 13.48 |
| 400 metre hurdles | Lucimar Teodoro (BRA) | 57.36 | Luciana França (BRA) | 58.38 | Lucy Jaramillo (ECU) | 58.81 |
| 3000 metre steeplechase | Zenaide Vieira (BRA) | 10:07.93 CR | Ángela Figueroa (COL) | 10:13.88 NR | Michelle Costa (BRA) | 10:24.35 |
| 4×100 metre relay | Brazil (BRA); Thaíssa Barbosa Presti; Luciana Alves dos Santos; Lucimar de Moura; Thatiana Regina Ignâcio | 43.54 | Colombia (COL); Felipa Palacios; Brigitte Merlano; Mirtha Brock; Yomara Hinestroza | 44.68 | Chile (CHI); Daniela Pavez; Carolina Díaz; María Fernanda Mackenna; Daniela Riderelli | 45.34 NR |
| 4×400 metre relay | Brazil (BRA); Lucimar Teodoro; Maria Laura Almirão; Sheila Ferreira; Josiane Tito | 3:33.34 | Colombia (COL); Felipa Palacios; Rosibel García; Mirtha Brock; María Alejandra Idrobo | 3:43.52 | Chile (CHI); Daniela Riderelli; Daniela Pavez; Carolina Díaz; María Fernanda Mackenna | 3:55.13 |
| 20,000 m track walk | Sandra Zapata (COL) | 1:37:46.0 CR, NR | Miriam Ramón (ECU) | 1:38:26.3 NR | Tânia Spindler (BRA) | 1:38:49.3 |
| High jump | Caterine Ibargüen (COL) | 1.84 m | Solange Witteveen (ARG) | 1.81 m | Marielys Rojas (VEN) | 1.78 m |
| Pole vault | Fabiana Murer (BRA) | 4.50 m CR | Alejandra García (ARG) | 4.20 m | Joana Ribeiro Costa (BRA) | 4.20 m |
| Long jump | Maurren Maggi (BRA) | 6.91 m | Keila Costa (BRA) | 6.83 m | Caterine Ibargüen (COL) | 6.18 m |
| Triple jump | Keila Costa (BRA) | 14.57 m CR AR | Fernanda Procópio Delfino (BRA) | 13.63 m | Jennifer Arveláez (VEN) | 13.52 m |
| Shot put | Elisângela Adriano (BRA) | 17.41 m | Luz Dary Castro (COL) | 16.35 m | Natalia Ducó (CHI) | 16.20 m |
| Discus throw | Elisângela Adriano (BRA) | 59.85 m | Luz Dary Castro (COL) | 52.23 m | Renata de Figueirêdo (BRA) | 51.69 m |
| Hammer throw | Johana Moreno (COL) | 61.93 m | Katiuscia de Jesus (BRA) | 61.57 m | Johana Ramírez (COL) | 61.10 m |
| Javelin throw | Alessandra Resende (BRA) | 57.75 m | Zuleima Araméndiz (COL) | 57.55 m | Leryn Franco (PAR) | 53.80 m |
| Heptathlon | Lucimara da Silva (BRA) | 5803 pts CR | Elizete da Silva (BRA) | 5727 pts PB | Daniela Crespo (ARG) | 4856 pts |
WR world record | AR area record | CR championship record | GR games record | NR national record | OR Olympic record | PB personal best | SB season best | WL world leading (in a given season)

== Medal table ==
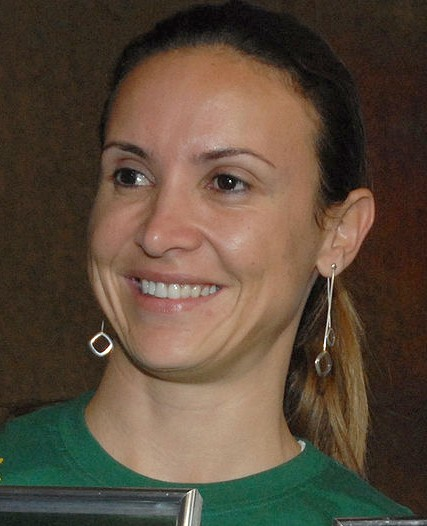
Maurren Maggi took the long jump gold for Brazil

* Host nation (Brazil)

| Rank | Nation | Gold | Silver | Bronze | Total |
|---|---|---|---|---|---|
| 1 | Brazil* | 28 | 17 | 16 | 61 |
| 2 | Colombia | 7 | 10 | 9 | 26 |
| 3 | Argentina | 4 | 5 | 4 | 13 |
| 4 | Chile | 2 | 2 | 4 | 8 |
| 5 | Ecuador | 1 | 5 | 2 | 8 |
| 6 | Uruguay | 1 | 1 | 1 | 3 |
| 7 | Guyana | 1 | 1 | 0 | 2 |
| 8 | Venezuela | 0 | 1 | 7 | 8 |
| 9 | Paraguay | 0 | 1 | 1 | 2 |
| 10 | Peru | 0 | 1 | 0 | 1 |
| 11 | Panama | 0 | 0 | 1 | 1 |
| Totals (11 entries) | | 44 | 44 | 45 | 133 |

=== Points table ===
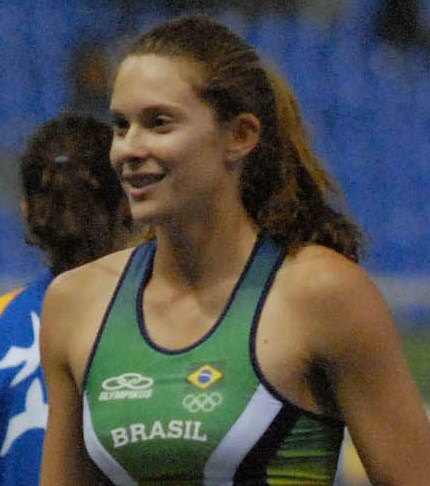
Brazilian pole vaulter Fabiana Murer broke the championship record

- Totals are calculated by awarding a country points for each time an athlete finishes in the top six of an event.

| Rank | Country | Total | Men | Women |
|---|---|---|---|---|
| 1 | Brazil | 547.5 | 252.5 | 295 |
| 2 | Colombia | 228 | 79 | 149 |
| 3 | Argentina | 158.5 | 99.5 | 59 |
| 4 | Chile | 91 | 60 | 31 |
| 5 | Ecuador | 85 | 50 | 37 |
| 6 | Venezuela | 69 | 49 | 20 |
| 7 | Peru | 23 | 7 | 16 |
| 8 | Uruguay | 21 | 16 | 5 |
| 9 | Guyana | 16 | 0 | 16 |
| 10 | Panama | 15 | 15 | 0 |
| 11 | Paraguay | 13 | 6 | 7 |
| 12 | Bolivia | 7 | 4 | 3 |
| 13 | Suriname | 0 | 0 | 0 |

== Participation ==
According to an unofficial count, at least 249 athletes from 13 countries participated.

- Argentina (39)
- Bolivia (5)
- Brazil (73)
- Chile (29)
- Colombia (34)
- Ecuador (18)
- Guyana (2)
- Panama (4)
- Paraguay (5)
- Peru (10)
- Suriname (2)
- Uruguay (5)
- Venezuela (23)

== See also ==
- 2007 World Championships in Athletics
- 2007 in athletics (track and field)
