= Athletics at the 2003 Pan American Games – Women's 1500 metres =

Women's 1500 metres at the Pan American Games

The Women's 1,500 metres event at the 2003 Pan American Games took place on Thursday August 7, 2003. Cuba's winner Adriana Muñoz set a national record in the final, clocking 4:09.57.

== Medalists ==
Gold	Adriana Muñoz; Cuba
Silver	Mary Jayne Harrelson; United States
Bronze	Mardrea Hyman; Jamaica

== Records ==
World Record	Qu Yunxia (CHN)	3:50.46	September 11, 1993	Beijing, PR China
Pan Am Record	Mary Decker (USA)	4:05.7	July 13, 1979	San Juan, Puerto Rico

== Results ==
Rank	Athlete	Time
1	Adriana Muñoz (CUB)	4:09.57
2	Mary Jayne Harrelson (USA)	4:09.72
3	Mardrea Hyman (JAM)	4:10.08
4	Malindi Elmore (CAN)	4:10.42
5	Dulce María Rodríguez (MEX)	4:11.46
6	Jany Tamargo (CUB)	4:20.33
7	Ashley Couper (BER)	4:20.98
8	Luciana Mendes (BRA)	4:21.80
9	Mónica Amboya (ECU)	4:27.22
10	Sonny García (DOM)	4:32.31
11	Elsa Monterroso (GUA)	4:46.53
—	Niusha Mancilla (BOL)	DNF
—	Lauren Simmons (USA)	DNS

== See also ==
- 2003 World Championships in Athletics – Women's 1500 metres
- Athletics at the 2004 Summer Olympics – Women's 1500 metres
