= 1998 World Junior Championships in Athletics – Women's 800 metres =

The women's 800 metres event at the 1998 World Junior Championships in Athletics was held in Annecy, France, at Parc des Sports on 28, 29 and 31 July 1998.

== Medalists ==
Gold	Olga Mikayeva; Russia
Silver	Nancy Jebet Langat; Kenya
Bronze	Naomi Misoi; Kenya

== Results ==
=== Final ===
31 July

Rank	Name	Nationality	Time	Notes
1st place, gold medalist(s)	Olga Mikayeva	Russia	2:05.34	
2nd place, silver medalist(s)	Nancy Jebet Langat	Kenya	2:05.43	
3rd place, bronze medalist(s)	Naomi Misoi	Kenya	2:05.77	
4	Liu Qifang	China	2:06.44	
5	Mihaela Stăncescu	Romania	2:06.90	
6	Josiane Tito	Brazil	2:07.52	
7	Jeannette Hoffmann	Germany	2:07.91	
8	Ingvill Måkestad	Norway	2:08.39	

=== Semifinals ===
29 July

==== Semifinal 1 ====
Rank	Name	Nationality	Time	Notes
1	Olga Mikayeva	Russia	2:06.50	Q
2	Nancy Jebet Langat	Kenya	2:06.76	Q
3	Mihaela Stăncescu	Romania	2:07.00	Q
4	Lindsay Hyatt	United States	2:07.15	
5	Oksana Luneva	Kyrgyzstan	2:07.24	
6	Ludivine Michel	Belgium	2:07.27	
7	Juliane Becker	Germany	2:08.91	
8	Reina Sasaki	Japan	2:11.09	

==== Semifinal 2 ====
Rank	Name	Nationality	Time	Notes
1	Naomi Misoi	Kenya	2:05.38	Q
2	Jeannette Hoffmann	Germany	2:05.43	Q
3	Liu Qifang	China	2:05.44	Q
4	Josiane Tito	Brazil	2:05.52	q
5	Ingvill Måkestad	Norway	2:05.80	q
6	Ryoko Takezawa	Japan	2:06.37	
7	Sonja Roman	Slovenia	2:08.10	
8	Hanan Khiouich	Morocco	2:13.78	

=== Heats ===
28 July

==== Heat 1 ====
Rank	Name	Nationality	Time	Notes
1	Ingvill Måkestad	Norway	2:10.10	Q
2	Nancy Jebet Langat	Kenya	2:10.11	Q
3	Oksana Luneva	Kyrgyzstan	2:10.75	Q
4	Iris Fuentes-Pila	Spain	2:11.07	
5	Lena Nilsson	Sweden	2:11.33	
6	Stephanie Schoeman	South Africa	2:12.25	
7	Motselisi Anna Mojaki	Lesotho	2:15.85	

==== Heat 2 ====
Rank	Name	Nationality	Time	Notes
1	Olga Mikayeva	Russia	2:06.57	Q
2	Mihaela Stăncescu	Romania	2:06.77	Q
3	Sonja Roman	Slovenia	2:07.48	Q
4	Josiane Tito	Brazil	2:07.98	q
5	Karla Burger	Namibia	2:10.39	
6	Lee Ya-Hui	Chinese Taipei	2:10.43	
7	Courtney Inman	Canada	2:10.62	

==== Heat 3 ====
Rank	Name	Nationality	Time	Notes
1	Naomi Misoi	Kenya	2:08.00	Q
2	Jeannette Hoffmann	Germany	2:08.51	Q
3	Hanan Khiouich	Morocco	2:09.03	Q
4	Ryoko Takezawa	Japan	2:09.21	q
5	Lauren Elms	Australia	2:11.85	
6	Kelly Edge	New Zealand	2:13.13	

==== Heat 4 ====
Rank	Name	Nationality	Time	Notes
1	Ludivine Michel	Belgium	2:05.62	Q
2	Liu Qifang	China	2:06.28	Q
3	Lindsay Hyatt	United States	2:06.30	Q
4	Juliane Becker	Germany	2:06.36	q
5	Reina Sasaki	Japan	2:09.63	q
6	Melissa de Leon	Trinidad and Tobago	2:12.06	
7	Ramomene Boikhutso	Botswana	2:18.45	

== Participation ==
According to an unofficial count, 27 athletes from 24 countries participated in the event.

- Australia (1)
- Belgium (1)
- Botswana (1)
- Brazil (1)
- Canada (1)
- China (1)
- Chinese Taipei (1)
- Germany (2)
- Japan (2)
- Kenya (2)
- Kyrgyzstan (1)
- Lesotho (1)
- Morocco (1)
- Namibia (1)
- New Zealand (1)
- Norway (1)
- Romania (1)
- Russia (1)
- Slovenia (1)
- South Africa (1)
- Spain (1)
- Sweden (1)
- Trinidad and Tobago (1)
- United States (1)
