= Athletics at the 2007 Pan American Games – Women's 1500 metres =

Women's 1500 metres at the Pan American Games

The women's 1500 metres event at the 2007 Pan American Games was held on July 27.

== Results ==
Rank	Name	Nationality	Time	Notes
1st place, gold medalist(s)	Juliana Paula dos Santos	Brazil	4:13.36	
2nd place, silver medalist(s)	Mary Jayne Harrelson	United States	4:15.24	
3rd place, bronze medalist(s)	Rosibel García	Colombia	4:15.78	PB
4	Marian Burnett	Guyana	4:17.91	NR
5	Lysaira del Valle	Puerto Rico	4:18.40	PB
6	Lindsey Gallo	United States	4:18.87	
7	Sabine Heitling	Brazil	4:19.21	PB
8	Valeria Rodríguez	Argentina	4:21.67	SB
9	Tanice Barnett	Jamaica	4:23.14	PB
10	Yadira Bataille	Cuba	4:24.49	
