= Sabine Fischer (runner) =

Swiss long-distance runner

Sabine Fischer (born 29 June 1973 in Menznau) is a Swiss long-distance runner.

== Achievements ==
Year	Competition	Venue	Position	Event	Notes
Representing Switzerland
2000	Olympic Games	Sydney, Australia	9th	1500 m	4:08.84
2001	Universiade	Beijing, China	3rd	1500 m	4:08.93
2010	European Championships	Barcelona, Spain	7th	5000 m	15:19.80
