= Sheena Gooding =

Bajan middle-distance runner (born 1981)

Personal information
- Born: 1 August 1981 (45 years, 1 day old)
- Home town: Saint Philip, Barbados
- Education: The Lodge School; Austin Peay State University; Illinois State University
- Height: 168 cm (5 ft 6 in)
- Weight: 58 kg (128 lb)

Sport
- Country: Barbados
- Sport: Sport of athletics
- Events: 800 metres Mile run
- College team: Austin Peay

Achievements and titles
- National finals: 2001 NCAAs; • 800m, 5th; 2002 Trinidadian Champs; • 800m, 2nd (silver); 2002 Barbados Champs; • 800m, 1st (gold); 2003 Barbados Champs; • 800m, 1st (gold); 2004 Barbados Champs; • 800m, 2nd (silver); 2004 Jamaican Champs; • 800m, 6th; 2008 Barbados Champs; • 800m, 1st (gold); 2008 Jamaican Champs; • 800m, 3rd (bronze)
- Personal bests: 800m: 2:03.59 (2005); Mile: 4:50.97 sh (2004)
Medal record
Women's athletics
Representing Barbados
CARIFTA U17 Games
Bronze medal – third place	1996 Kingston	800 m
Silver medal – second place	1996 Kingston	1500 m
Silver medal – second place	1997 Bridgetown	800 m
CARIFTA U20 Games
Bronze medal – third place	1999 Fort-de-France	800 m
Silver medal – second place	2000 St. George's	800 m
CAC U20 Championships
Silver medal – second place	2000 San Juan	800 m
NACAC Under-25 Championships
Bronze medal – third place	2000 Monterrey	800 m
ALBA Games
Silver medal – second place	2007 Caracas	800 m
NACAC Championships
Bronze medal – third place	2007 San Salvador	800 m
- Updated on 6 May 2024

Sheena Gooding (born 1 August 1981) is a Bajan middle-distance runner specializing in the 800 metres. She is a three-time Athletics Association of Barbados national champion in the event and she has represented Barbados at the 2002 Commonwealth Games and 2004 IAAF World Indoor Championships.

== Career ==
Originally from Barbados, Gooding was active in Caribbean youth athletics competitions for The Lodge School. She competed in the 1996, 1997, 1999, and 2000 CARIFTA Games winning two silver medals and a bronze in the under-17 category and two 800 m silvers in the under-20 age group. Competing as a member of the Bajan 4 × 400 metres relay team, Gooding also won the silver medal at the 1996 Central American and Caribbean Junior Championships in Athletics.

She was recruited by Austin Peay Governors track and field coach Elvis Forde to compete in the NCAA. She twice qualified for the NCAA Division I Women's Outdoor Track and Field Championships, with her best finish of 5th coming at the 2001 edition (she was eliminated in the semifinals at the 2002 meet).

After winning her final CARIFTA Games medal in 2000 while training with the Austin Peay Governors, Gooding represented Barbados at three other international championships that season. After winning silver in the under-20 800 m at the 2000 Central American and Caribbean Junior Championships in Athletics, Gooding won a bronze at the 2000 NACAC Under-25 Championships. She ended her season at the 2000 World U20 Championships, finishing 5th in her first round 800 m heat and failing to advance to the semifinals.

Gooding faced her stiffest outdoor competition at the 2002 Commonwealth Games, where she finished 5th in her heat and did not advance to the semifinals. The following year, she did qualify for the finals of the 2003 Pan American Games 800 m, where she finished 7th, followed by finishing 4th in her 2003 Summer Universiade heat and failing to advance.

In her only global championship at the 2004 World Indoor Championships, Gooding ran 2:06.97 to finish 6th in the first heat, failing to advance. She continued to represent Barbados for three more years, finishing 4th at the 2005 CAC Championships, winning 800 m silver at the 2007 ALBA Games, bronze at the 2007 NACAC Championships, and finishing 7th in her heat at the 2007 Pan American Games.

== Personal life ==
Gooding is from Saint Philip, Barbados where she attended The Lodge School. The school's inter-house championships was renamed the Sheena Gooding Inter-House Track and Field Championships in her honor. After her time at Austin Peay, she competed her master's at Illinois State University in sports management. She worked as a personal trainer after graduation while still competing as a professional athlete. She was inducted into the Austin Peay Governors Hall of Fame in 2008.

Gooding's cousin is Heather Gooding, Bajan Olympian in the 4 × 400 m relay at the 1972 Games.

== Statistics ==
=== Personal best progression ===
800m progression
#	Mark	Pl.	Competition	Venue	Date	Ref.
1	2:06.63	2nd place, silver medalist(s)	CAC	San Juan, Puerto Rico	14 Jul 2000	
2	2:06.42	(silver) (Round 1)	Sea Ray	Knoxville, TN	12 Apr 2001	
3	2:05.91	(bronze) (Heat 2)	NCAA	Eugene, OR	29 May 2001	
4	2:04.95	5th	NCAA	Eugene, OR	31 May 2001	
5	2:03.91	3rd place, bronze medalist(s)	DrakeR	Des Moines, IA	25 Apr 2003	
6	2:03.59	4th	Central American and Caribbean Championships	Nassau, Bahamas	10 Jul 2005	
