= 1994 South American Youth Championships in Athletics =

XII South American Youth Championships in Athletics
- Dates: September 30-October 2
- Host city: Cochabamba, Bolivia
- Level: Youth
- Events: 38
- Participation: about 233 athletes from 11 nations

The 12th South American Youth Championships in Athletics were held in Cochabamba, Bolivia from September 30-October 2, 1994.

== Medal summary ==
Medal winners are published for boys and girls. Complete results can be found on the "World Junior Athletics History" website.

All results are marked as "affected by altitude" (A), because Cochabamba is located at 2,558 metres above sea level.

=== Men ===
Event	Gold		Silver		Bronze	
100 metres (wind: +1.8 m/s)	Jimmy Pino (COL)	10.71A	Martín Voss (ARG)	10.94A	Jonathan Medina (VEN)	11.03A
200 metres (wind: -2.3 m/s)	Jimmy Pino (COL)	21.95A	Daniel de Oliveira (BRA)	22.54A	Evandro Tristão (BRA)	22.62A
400 metres	Arturo Arce (PER)	49.70A	Rogério Rufino (BRA)	50.14A	Marcos García (URU)	50.22A
800 metres	Marcos García (URU)	1:58.63A	Wendell Silva (BRA)	1:59.77A	Everson Silva (BRA)	2:00.88A
1500 metres	Claudinei Vítor (BRA)	4:16.22A	Wendell Silva (BRA)	4:17.13A	Juan Mamani (PER)	4:18.78A
5000 metres	Juan Mamani (PER)	16:33.52A	Isaac Colque (BOL)	16:43.39A	Jeison Vargas (COL)	17:12.02A
1500 metres steeplechase	Angelo Álvarez (CHI)	4:40.33A	Damião de Melo (BRA)	4:47.13A	Erick Jujra (PER)	4:50.82A
110 metres hurdles (wind: +2.3 m/s)	Rodrigo Palladino (BRA)	14.55A w	Rodrigo Terra (BRA)	14.76A w	Tomás Vega (CHI)	14.87A w
300 metres hurdles	Tomás Vega (CHI)	38.60A	Rodrigo Palladino (BRA)	39.00A	Gustavo Blanco (ARG)	39.24A
High jump	Fabrício Romero (BRA)	2.07A	Wagner Príncipe (BRA)	2.00A	Camel Etcheverry (COL)	1.97A
Pole vault	Cristian Aguirre (ARG)	3.90A	Santiago Lorenzo (ARG)	3.70A	Daniel Rosende (CHI)	3.50A
Long jump	Diego Ripanti (ARG)	7.21A	Johnny Rodríguez (VEN)	6.93A	Luis Marfán (CHI)	6.86A
Triple jump	Johnny Rodríguez (VEN)	14.85A	Luiz da Silveira (BRA)	14.83A	Diego Ripanti (ARG)	14.21A
Shot put	José Puyol (CHI)	15.08A	Jeberton Fermino (BRA)	14.73A	John Mena (COL)	14.67A
Discus throw	Hernán Vázquez (ARG)	44.68A	John Mena (COL)	44.52A	Renato Pires (BRA)	44.18A
Hammer throw	Cristian Fernández (ARG)	64.14A	Juan Palacios (ARG)	53.00A	Renzo Godoy (PER)	46.38A
Javelin throw	Santiago Lorenzo (ARG)	58.16A	Adriano Vitorino (BRA)	56.52A	John Mena (COL)	54.94A
Hexathlon	Ramón Vivas (VEN)	4069A	Carlos García (VEN)	4045A	Adriano de Oliveira (BRA)	3933A
5000 metres track walk	Raomir Hernández (VEN)	NTT	Franciello de Souza (BRA)	NTT	Juan Chocho (ECU)	NTT
4 × 100 metres relay	Brazil; Daniel Toledo; Alessandro Rodrigues; Rodrigo Palladino; Evandro de Tristão	42.64A	Argentina; Leandro Renny; Diego Ripanti; Gustavo Blanco; Martín Voss	43.13A	Chile; Daniel Haeussler; Andres Illanes; Gonzalo Risopatrón; Benjamín Arteaga	43.35A
4 × 400 metres relay	Brazil; Dourado; Aurelio; Rogerio da Silva dos Santos	3:21.63A	Peru; Jimmy Silva; Ramírez; Christian García; Arturo Arce	3:25.45A	Argentina; Martín Voss; Blas Parada; Juan Pardo; Gustavo Blanco	3:27.38A

=== Women ===
Event	Gold		Silver		Bronze	
100 metres (wind: +0.2 m/s)	Alessandra Ferreira (BRA)	12.23A	María Laura Rodríguez (ARG)	12.24A	Adriana Moraes (BRA)	12.37A
200 metres (wind: 1.6 m/s)	Adriana Moraes (BRA)	25.32A	Silvana de Santana (BRA)	25.46A	Andrea Higuita (COL)	25.57A
400 metres	Zulay Nazareno (VEN)	57.27A	Josiane Tito (BRA)	57.71A	Karina Soto (URU)	58.44A
800 metres	Fabiana da Silva (BRA)	2:14.30A	Bertha Sánchez (COL)	2:16.64A	Maria Cecilia Silva (BRA)	2:18.90A
1500 metres	Bertha Sánchez (COL)	4:46.99A	Joaquina Rondón (COL)	4:50.49A	Fabiana da Silva (BRA)	4:53.49A
3000 metres	Bertha Sánchez (COL)	10:35.2A	Joaquina Rondón (COL)	10:39.8A	Fabiana da Silva (BRA)	10:46.4A
100 metres hurdles (wind: 1.4 m/s)	Patrícia de Souza (BRA)	14.56A	Cora Olivero (ARG)	14.72A	Kelly Ribeiro de Oliveira (BRA)	14.76A
300 metres hurdles	Rúbia dos Santos (BRA)	43.37A	Carolina Matesic (CHI)	44.48A	Eyda Rentería (COL)	44.74A
High jump	Silmara Gandolfo (BRA)	1.67A	Aline Zimmermann (BRA)	1.64A	Gisela Pfeiffer (ARG)	1.61A
Long jump	Gisele de Oliveira (BRA)	5.85A	Gisela Pfeiffer (ARG)	5.76A	Alicia Medina (ARG)	5.74A
Shot put	Polianna de Oliveira (BRA)	11.87A	Luz Dary Castro (COL)	11.76A	Elisângela Zuede (BRA)	11.64A
Discus throw	Guadalupe Sallar (ARG)	38.16A	Luz Dary Castro (COL)	35.66A	Giovanna Miranda (BRA)	34.18A
Javelin throw	Daniela Massoli (CHI)	41.72A	Giovanna Miranda (BRA)	39.42A	Xiolimar Carolina Castillo (VEN)	36.34A
Pentathlon	Ellen Marinho (BRA)	3234A	Gladibeth Morles (VEN)	3060A	Laura Spelmeyer (ARG)	2953A
3000 metres Track Walk	Gladys Criollo (ECU)	15:39.2A	Rosa Sánchez (BOL)	15:52.6A	Saskia Luetke (BRA)	16:20.5A
4 × 100 metres relay	Brazil; Campeiro; Silvania da Conceiçao; Adriana Moraes; Alessandra Ferreira	47.31A	Peru; Ursula Romero; Patricia Hasegawa; Lucía Rodríguez; Erika Varillas	48.75A	Argentina; Flavia Rougier; Valeria Falcón; Carolina Mondelo; María Laura Rodríguez	49.21A
4 × 400 metres relay	Brazil; Josiane Tito; Rúbia dos Santos; Silvania da Conceiçao; Adriana Moraes	3:53.14A	Chile; Carolina Matesic; Rosa Hernández; Sandra Llanquin; Paula Osorio	4:01.62A	Argentina; Cora Olivero; Alicia Medina; Jessica Cardinal; Carolina Mondelo	4:07.93A

== Medal table (unofficial) ==
* Host nation (Bolivia)

Rank	Nation	Gold	Silver	Bronze	Total
1	Brazil (BRA)	16	16	12	44
2	Argentina (ARG)	6	7	8	21
3	Colombia (COL)	4	6	6	16
4	Venezuela (VEN)	4	3	2	9
5	Chile (CHI)	4	2	4	10
6	Peru (PER)	2	2	3	7
7	Uruguay (URU)	1	0	2	3
8	Ecuador (ECU)	1	0	1	2
9	Bolivia (BOL)*	0	2	0	2
Totals (9 entries)		38	38	38	114

== Participation (unofficial) ==
Detailed result lists can be found on the "World Junior Athletics History" website. An unofficial count yields the number of about 233 athletes from about 11 countries:

- Argentina (28)
- Bolivia (30)
- Brazil (58)
- Chile (41)
- Colombia (9)
- Ecuador (8)
- Panama (8)
- Paraguay (10)
- Peru (24)
- Uruguay (5)
- Venezuela (12)
