= Luz Dary Castro =

Colombian athlete (born 1978)

Personal information
- Full name: Luz Dary Castro Lemos
- Born: May 30, 1978 (age 48) Bogotá, Colombia

Sport
- Country: Colombia
- Sport: Athletics
Medal record
Women's Athletics
Representing Colombia
Bolivarian Games
| Gold medal – first place | 2001 Ambato | Shot put |
| Gold medal – first place | 2001 Ambato | Discus throw |
| Gold medal – first place | 2005 Armenia | Shot put |
| Gold medal – first place | 2005 Armenia | Discus throw |
| Gold medal – first place | 2009 Sucre | Shot put |
| Silver medal – second place | 2009 Sucre | Discus throw |
South American Youth Championships
| Silver medal – second place | 1994 Cochabamba | Shot put |
| Silver medal – second place | 1994 Cochabamba | Discus throw |
- Updated on 11 May 2013

Luz Dary Castro Lemos (born May 30, 1978, in Bogotá) is a female shot putter and discus thrower from Colombia.

== Career ==
She set her personal best (16.70m) in the women's shot put at a meet in Santiago de Chile on August 5, 2003.

== Achievements ==
| Year | Competition | Venue | Position | Event | Notes |
Representing Colombia
| 1994 | South American Youth Championships | Cochabamba, Bolivia | 2nd | Shot put | 11.76 m A |
| 1994 | South American Youth Championships | Cochabamba, Bolivia | 2nd | Discus throw | 35.66 m A |
| 1994 | South American Youth Championships | Cochabamba, Bolivia | 5th | Javelin throw | 35.52 m A |
| 1997 | South American Junior Championships | San Carlos, Uruguay | 1st | Shot put | 13.63 m |
| 1997 | South American Junior Championships | San Carlos, Uruguay | 2nd | Discus throw | 41.86 m |
| 1999 | South American Championships | Bogotá, Colombia | 4th | Shot put | 14.05 m |
| 1999 | South American Championships | Bogotá, Colombia | 2nd | Discus throw | 50.95 m |
| 2001 | Bolivarian Games | Ambato, Ecuador | 1st | Shot put | 15.84 m A |
| 2001 | Bolivarian Games | Ambato, Ecuador | 1st | Discus throw | 52.72 m A |
| 2002 | Ibero-American Championships | Guatemala City, Guatemala | 5th | Shot put | 15.78 m |
| 2002 | Ibero-American Championships | Guatemala City, Guatemala | 2nd | Discus throw | 15.61 m |
| 2002 | Central American and Caribbean Games | San Salvador, El Salvador | 2nd | Shot put | 15.98 m |
| 2002 | Central American and Caribbean Games | San Salvador, El Salvador | 1st | Discus throw | 55.11 m |
| 2003 | South American Championships | Barquisimeto, Venezuela | 2nd | Shot put | 16.59 m |
| 2003 | South American Championships | Barquisimeto, Venezuela | 2nd | Discus throw | 51.73 m |
| 2003 | Pan American Games | Santo Domingo, Dom. Rep. | 9th | Shot put | 14.92 m |
| 2003 | Pan American Games | Santo Domingo, Dom. Rep. | 6th | Discus throw | 55.65 m |
| 2004 | Ibero-American Championships | Huelva, Spain | 9th | Shot put | 14.26 m |
| 2004 | Ibero-American Championships | Huelva, Spain | 6th | Discus throw | 51.82 m |
| 2005 | South American Championships | Cali, Colombia | 2nd | Shot put | 16.27 m |
| 2005 | South American Championships | Cali, Colombia | 1st | Discus throw | 53.49 m |
| 2005 | Bolivarian Games | Armenia, Colombia | 1st | Shot put | 16.46 m GR A |
| 2005 | Bolivarian Games | Armenia, Colombia | 1st | Discus | 53.34 A |
| 2006 | South American Championships | Tunja, Colombia | 3rd | Shot put | 16.26 m |
| 2006 | South American Championships | Tunja, Colombia | 2nd | Discus throw | 48.88 m |
| 2007 | South American Championships | São Paulo, Brazil | 2nd | Shot put | 16.35 m |
| 2007 | South American Championships | São Paulo, Brazil | 2nd | Discus throw | 52.23 m |
| 2008 | Central American and Caribbean Championships | Cali, Colombia | 8th | Shot put | 13.37 m |
| 2008 | Central American and Caribbean Championships | Cali, Colombia | 6th | Discus throw | 47.54 m |
| 2009 | South American Championships | Lima, Peru | 4th | Shot put | 15.28 m |
| 2009 | South American Championships | Lima, Peru | 6th | Discus throw | 48.38 m |
| 2009 | Bolivarian Games | Sucre, Bolivia | 1st | Shot put | 16.37 m A |
| 2009 | Bolivarian Games | Sucre, Bolivia | 2nd | Discus throw | 49.66 m A |
