= Juliana Paula dos Santos =

Brazilian middle-distance runner (born 1983)

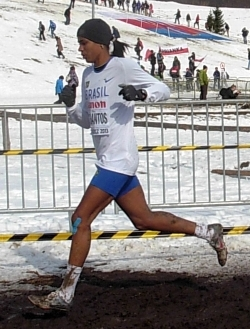
- Juliana Paula dos Santos in 2013.

Personal information
- Born: 12 July 1983 (age 42) Cubatão, Brazil
- Height: 1.65 m (5 ft 5 in)
- Weight: 50 kg (110 lb)

Sport
- Country: Brazil
- Sport: Track and field
- Event: 3000m steeplechase
Medal record
Pan American Games
Gold medal – first place	2007 Rio de Janeiro	1500 m
Gold medal – first place	2015 Toronto	5000 m
South American Championships
Gold medal – first place	2003 Barquisimeto	1500 m
Gold medal – first place	2006 Tunja	1500 m
Gold medal – first place	2006 Tunja	4 × 400 m relay

Juliana Paula Gomes dos Santos (née de Azevedo; born 12 July 1983) is a Brazilian middle-distance runner. Her greatest achievement is a gold medal in the 1500 metres at the 2007 Pan American Games held in Rio de Janeiro. She is a three-time gold medallist at the South American Championships in Athletics, being the 1500 m champion in 2003 and 2006, as well as a 4 × 400 metres relay champion.

Santos was a two-time champion over 800 metres at both South American Youth and Junior levels before taking a bronze medal at the 2002 World Junior Championships in Athletics. As a senior athlete, she has won nine Brazilian titles, including six consecutive titles in the 1500 m from 2003 to 2008. She holds personal bests of 2:01.25 minutes for the 800 m and 4:07.30 minutes for the 1500 m; the latter is the Brazilian record for the distance.

She is married to Marílson Gomes dos Santos, another Brazilian runner and the first South American victor at the New York City Marathon.

== Career ==
=== Youth and junior career ===
Born Juliana Paula de Azevedo on 12 July 1983 in Cubatão, São Paulo, she competed in track competitions as a teenager. Her first international success came at the 1998 South American Youth Championships in Athletics, where she was the gold medallist in the 800 metres. She retained that title two years later at the 2000 edition.

That same year she won her first medal at junior level, although her age category rival Jenny Mejías pushed her into second place at the 2000 South American Junior Championships in Athletics. The roles were reversed over the two successive competitions, as Azevedo was crowned South American junior champion over 800 m in 2001 and 2002 (the latter victory coming on home soil as part of the 2002 South American Games).

She was chosen to represent Brazil at the 2002 World Junior Championships in Athletics and she produced a personal best in the 800 m final. She was beaten by winner Janeth Jepkosgei (a future world champion) but edged out Great Britain's Jemma Simpson to secure the bronze medal – her first global medal. She made her senior international debut for Brazil that season, running in the 800 m at the 2002 Ibero-American Championships in Athletics, where she placed sixth.

=== South American titles ===
She entered the senior ranks fully in the 2003 season. She placed third in the 800 m at the Brazilian Athletics Championships, but showed new strength in the 1500 metres discipline by winning her first national title in a personal best of 4:19.16 minutes at the distance. At the 2003 South American Championships in Athletics she was dominant in the longer event, setting a personal best and championship record of 4:17.54 minutes to win by a margin of four seconds over runner-up Niusha Mancilla. She did not appear internationally in 2004 but retained her national title in 1500 m and ran an 800 m best of 2:02.60 minutes. She repeated that feat the following year, winning a third straight Brazilian title and an improvement to 2:01.25 minutes.

At the 2006 Brazilian Championships she secured an 800/1500 m double, including a new best of 4:16.25 minutes over the longer distance. She returned to the top of the regional scene with two gold medals at the 2006 South American Championships in Athletics, first in the 1500 m (regaining her title from Rosibel García) and then in the 4 × 400 metres relay which the Brazilian women won by several seconds.

=== Pan American champion ===
She married fellow Brazilian runner Marílson Gomes dos Santos around the start of 2007 and began competing under her married name, Juliana Gomes dos Santos. A fifth straight title in the 1500 m came at the Brazilian Championships that year and she was selected to run at the 2007 Pan American Games. There she became the first South American woman to win the 1500 m Pan American title, seeing off American Mary Jayne Harrelson by a margin of nearly two seconds. Hers was one of nine athletics gold medals for the hosts in Rio de Janeiro. She ran in the 800 m heats the same day, but did not make the final of that discipline. She ran in Europe that June a set a personal best of 4:11.39 minutes in Neerpelt.

Santos won another 1500 m national title in 2008, but did not compete internationally over the following seasons and missed 2009 entirely. She returned to action in 2010 and ran a Brazilian record time of minutes in the 1500 m to claim the silver medal at the 2010 Ibero-American Championships in Athletics (beaten only by Spain's Nuria Fernández who was implicated in a doping scandal that year). However, this was a brief resurgence as she did not compete after that event and missed the 2011 season. The highlight of her 2012 was a middle-distance double at the Brazilian Championships.

Santos made her first international appearance in cross country running at the 2013 IAAF World Cross Country Championships and on her first attempt placed 69th in the women's race. She ran a personal best of 16:56.73 minutes for the 5000 metres of the track that summer. Two international medals came at the 2014 Ibero-American Championships in Athletics, held on her home area of São Paulo. She was the bronze medallist in the 1500 m and successfully stepped up a distance with a gold medal over 3000 metres. In spite of this success, when it came to the national stage she was relegated to runner-up in both middle-distance track events, losing to Jessica dos Santos in the 800 m and Flávia de Lima in the 1500 m.

== Personal bests ==
- 800 metres – 2:01.25 min (2005)
- 1500 metres – 4:07.30 min (2010) NR
- 3000 metres – 9:19.80 min (2014)
- 5000 metres – 16:56.73 min (2013)

== National titles ==
- Brazilian Athletics Championships
  - 800 metres: 2006, 2012
  - 1500 metres: 2003, 2004, 2005, 2006, 2007, 2008, 2012
