= Malindi Elmore =

Canadian middle-distance runner

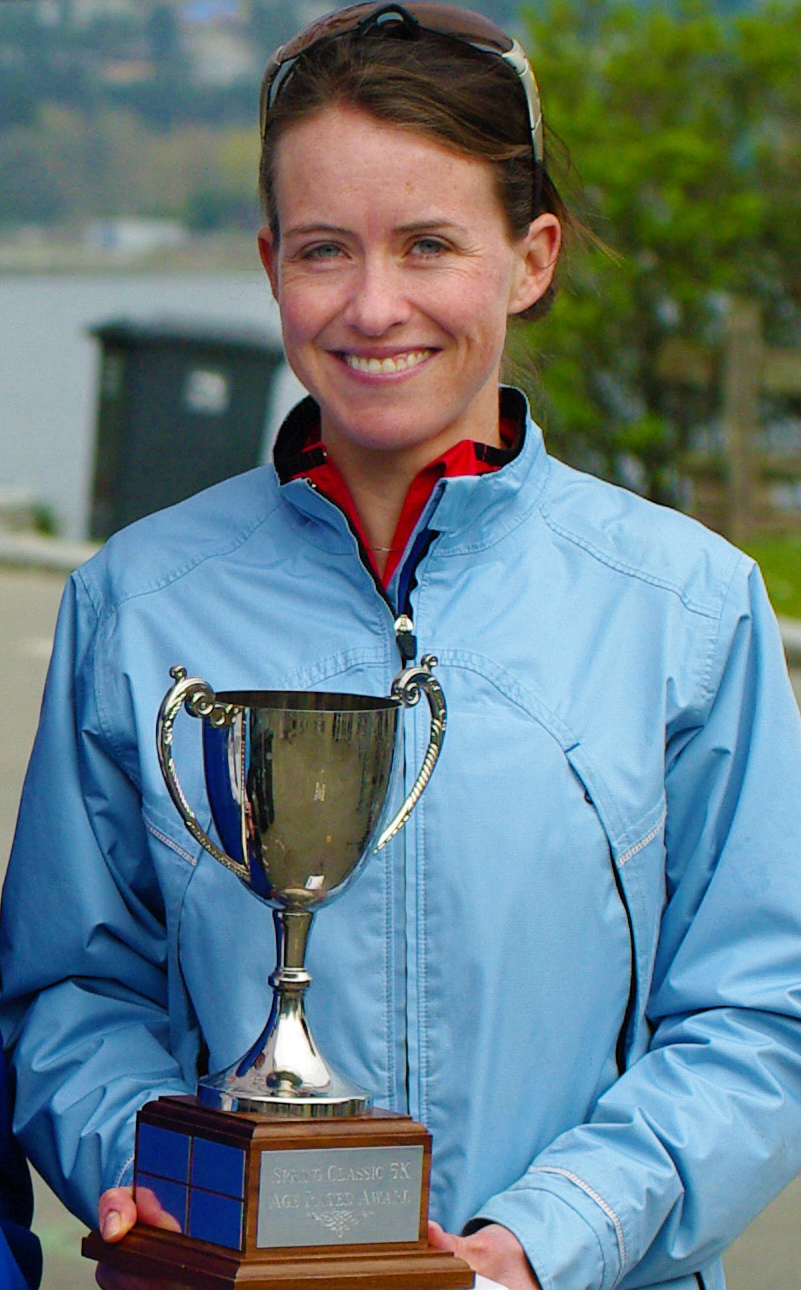
- Elmore on 2010 Dave Reed Spring Classic 5K

Personal information
- Nationality: Canadian
- Born: March 13, 1980 (age 46) Kelowna, British Columbia, Canada
- Height: 168 cm (5 ft 6 in)
- Weight: 51 kg (112 lb)

Sport
- Country: Canada
- Sport: Women's athletics
- Club: Saucony
- Team: UBC Okanagan

Achievements and titles
- Olympic finals: 2004 Summer Olympics
- Personal bests: 1500 m:4:02.64 (Rome 2004); Mile: 4:30.70 (Toronto 2009); 3000 m: 8:51.90 (Rovereto 2006); 5000 m: 15:12.12 (Walnut 2007); 10K: 32:44 (Vancouver 2019); Half marathon: 1:10:11 (Gifu 2023); Marathon: 2:23:30 (Berlin 2023)
Medal record
Women's athletics
Representing Canada
World University Games
Bronze medal – third place	2003 Summer Universiade	1500 m
Pan American Games
Bronze medal – third place	2011 Pan American Games	1500 m

Malindi Elmore (born March 13, 1980, in Kelowna, British Columbia) is a Canadian track and field athlete specialising in the middle-distance events. As of January 19, 2020, she holds the Canadian record for the marathon, running a 2:24:50.

She was a five-time All-American at Stanford University and holds the school record in the 800m and 1500m distances.

She represented Canada in the 1,500 metres at the 2004 Summer Olympics, failing to qualify for the semifinals.

She won the Vancouver Sun Run in 2010 with a time of 33:06 over the 10K distance.

She qualified to represent Canada at the 2020 Summer Olympics in June 2021 and finished ninth in the women's marathon.

In May 2024, she won the Canadian 10 km Championships in 32:50 at the age of 44, only 6 seconds off her personal best, as part of her build-up in the marathon to the 2024 Summer Olympics in Paris. It was her first national 10 km title in 15 years.

== Competition record ==
Year	Competition	Venue	Position	Event	Notes
Representing Canada
2001	Universiade	Beijing, China	10th	1500 m	4:14.66
2003	Pan American Games	Santo Domingo, Dominican Republic	4th	1500 m	4:10.42
2003	Universiade	Daegu, South Korea	3rd	1500 m	4:12.00
2004	Olympic Games	Athens, Greece	32nd (h)	1500 m	4:09.81
2006	Commonwealth Games	Melbourne, Australia	8th	1500 m	4:09.06
2011	Pan American Games	Guadalajara, Mexico	3rd	1500 m	4:27.57
2021	Olympic Games	Tokyo, Japan	9th	Marathon	2:30:59
2024	Olympic Games	Paris, France	35th	Marathon	2:31:08

== Personal bests ==
Outdoor

- 800 metres – 2:02.69 (Victoria 2004)
- 1500 metres – 4:02.64 (Rome 2004)
- One mile – 4:30.70 (Toronto 2009)
- 3000 metres – 8:51.90 (Rovereto 2006)
- 5000 metres – 15:12.12 (Walnut 2007)
- 10K run – 32:44 (Vancouver 2019)
- Half marathon – 1:10:11 (Gifu 2023)
- Marathon – 2:23:30 (Berlin 2023)

Indoor

- One mile – 4:31.03 (Fayetteville 2006)
- 3000 metres – 8:57.59 (Boston 2007)
