= 2002 European Athletics Indoor Championships – Women's 1500 metres =

The women's 1500 metres event at the 2002 European Athletics Indoor Championships was held on March 2–3.

== Medalists ==
Gold	Silver	Bronze
Yekaterina Puzanova; Russia	Elena Iagăr; Romania	Alesia Turava; Belarus

== Results ==
=== Heats ===
First 3 of each heat (Q) and the next 3 fastest (q) qualified for the semifinals.

Rank	Heat	Name	Nationality	Time	Notes
1	1	Elena Iagăr	Romania	4:12.97	Q
2	1	Olga Komyagina	Russia	4:13.43	Q
3	1	Hayley Tullett	Great Britain	4:13.58	Q
4	1	Daniela Yordanova	Bulgaria	4:14.21	q, SB
5	1	Sara Palmas	Italy	4:14.75	q
6	1	Zulema Fuentes-Pila	Spain	4:16.11	q
7	1	Brigitte Mühlbacher	Austria	4:17.72	
8	2	Yuliya Kosenkova	Russia	4:18.15	Q
9	2	Yekaterina Puzanova	Russia	4:18.16	Q
10	2	Alesia Turava	Belarus	4:18.38	Q
11	2	Iris Fuentes-Pila	Spain	4:18.53	
12	2	Nédia Semedo	Portugal	4:18.93	
13	2	Renata Hoppová	Czech Republic	4:19.09	
14	2	Rasa Drazdauskaitė	Lithuania	4:19.09	SB
15	1	Heidi Jensen	Denmark	4:19.12	SB
16	2	Adoración García	Spain	4:19.14	
17	1	Jessica Augusto	Portugal	4:20.27	
18	2	Tetyana Kryvobok	Ukraine	4:21.02	

=== Final ===
Rank	Name	Nationality	Time	Notes
1st place, gold medalist(s)	Yekaterina Puzanova	Russia	4:06.30	PB
2nd place, silver medalist(s)	Elena Iagăr	Romania	4:06.90	PB
3rd place, bronze medalist(s)	Alesia Turava	Belarus	4:07.69	PB
4	Yuliya Kosenkova	Russia	4:08.63	SB
5	Daniela Yordanova	Bulgaria	4:10.47	SB
6	Olga Komyagina	Russia	4:11.97	
7	Sara Palmas	Italy	4:13.21	PB
8	Zulema Fuentes-Pila	Spain	4:15.23	
9	Hayley Tullett	Great Britain	4:17.14	
