= Iris Fuentes-Pila =

Spanish middle-distance runner

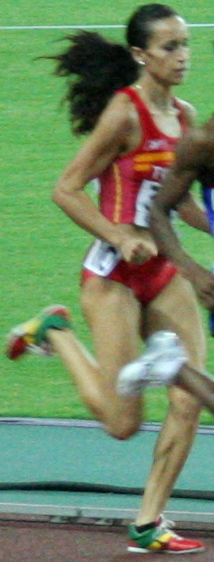
Iris Fuentes-Pila in World Athletics Championships 2007 in Osaka - Scene from the women's 1500 metres final.

Iris María Fuentes-Pila Ortiz (born 10 August 1980 in Santander) is a Spanish middle distance runner who specializes in the 1500 metres.

She finished eleventh at the 2002 European Championships. She also competed at the 2004 Summer Olympics, reaching the semi-final.

She and her sisters, Margarita and Zulema, were selected for the Spanish 2007 European Indoor Championships team.

== Competition record ==
Year	Competition	Venue	Position	Event	Notes
Representing Spain
1998	World Junior Championships	Annecy, France	20th (h)	800 m	2:11.07
2001	European U23 Championships	Amsterdam, Netherlands	4th	1500 m	4:13.10
2001	Mediterranean Games	Radès, Tunisia	8th	1500 m	4:23.20
2002	European Indoor Championships	Vienna, Austria	11th (h)	1500 m	4:18.53
2002	European Championships	Munich, Germany	11th	1500 m	4:13.02
2004	Olympic Games	Athens, Greece	18th (sf)	1500 m	4:07.69
2007	European Indoor Championships	Birmingham, United Kingdom	–	3000 m	DNF
2007	World Championships	Osaka, Japan	10th	1500 m	4:14.00
2008	Olympic Games	Beijing, China	8th	1500 m	4:04.86
2009	World Championships	Berlin, Germany	9th (sf)	1500 m	4:07.10
2010	Ibero-American Championships	San Fernando, Spain	2nd	3000 m	9:06.24
2012	European Championships	Helsinki, Finland	19th (h)	1500 m	4:15.95

== Personal bests ==
- 800 metres - 2:02.40 min (2004)
- 1500 metres - 4:04.25 min (2002)
- 3000 metres - 9:14.8 min (2002)
