= Santiago Lorenzo =

Argentine decathlete (born 1978)

Personal information
- Nationality: Argentina
- Born: May 4, 1978 (age 48) Buenos Aires, Argentina
- Height: 1.91 m (6 ft 3 in)
- Weight: 93 kg (205 lb)

Sport
- Sport: Athletics
Medal record
Athletics
Representing Argentina
South American Games
Gold medal – first place	1998 Cuenca	Decathlon
South American Youth Championships
Gold medal – first place	1994 Cochabamba	Javelin throw
Silver medal – second place	1994 Cochabamba	Pole vault
- Updated on 11 May 2013

Santiago Lorenzo (born May 4, 1978) is an Argentinian retired decathlete who competed for his native country at the 2004 Summer Olympics. He was the 2001 NCAA decathlon champion while setting his personal best score (7889 points) in Eugene, Oregon on May 31, 2001. In the process, he became the first decathlon champion at Oregon. He was a two-time Pac-10 decathlon champion, winning first in 2001, and then again in 2003, when he helped the Ducks capture their first conference team title in 13 years.

== Personal life ==
Born in Buenos Aires, Lorenzo moved to the United States in 1999 with a scholarship to run track for the University of Oregon. In 2003, he graduated from University of Oregon with a BS in exercise and movement science, in 2008 he graduated from University of Oregon with a Master of Science in human physiology, and earned a Ph.D. in integrative physiology from University of Oregon in 2010. His research focused on exercise and environmental physiology (essentially, understanding the physiological mechanisms by which heat/cold, or altitude affect exercise performance in athletes). After finishing his doctorate in April 2010, he moved to Dallas, Texas, for a postdoctoral fellowship at University of Texas Southwestern Medical Center. He conducted research studies investigating mechanisms of shortness of breath with exertion in obese individuals until June 2012. Currently he resides in Sarasota, Florida, with his wife and two children, where he is a full-time faculty member at Lake Erie College of Osteopathic Medicine.

== Achievements ==
Year	Competition	Venue	Position	Event	Notes
Representing Argentina
1994	South American Youth Championships	Cochabamba, Bolivia	2nd	Pole vault	3.70 m A
1994	South American Youth Championships	Cochabamba, Bolivia	1st	Javelin throw	58.16 m A
1996	South American Junior Championships	Bucaramanga, Colombia	2nd	Decathlon	6352 pts
1997	South American Championships	Mar del Plata, Argentina	2nd	Decathlon	6508 pts
1997	South American Junior Championships	San Carlos, Uruguay	2nd	Decathlon	6352 pts
1997	Pan American Junior Championships	Havana, Cuba	2nd	Decathlon	6738 pts
1998	Ibero-American Championships	Lisbon, Portugal	2nd	Decathlon	7177 pts
1998	South American Games	Cuenca, Ecuador	1st	Decathlon	6940 pts A
1999	South American Championships	Bogotá, Colombia	1st	Decathlon	7344 pts A
1999	Pan American Games	Winnipeg, Canada	5th	Decathlon	6820 pts
2001	Universiade	Beijing, PR China	9th	Decathlon	7565 pts
2003	Pan American Games	Santo Domingo, Dominican Republic	4th	Decathlon	7467 pts
2004	Olympic Games	Athens, Greece	24th	Decathlon	7592 pts
