= Marcell Allmond =

American football player (born 1981)

Profile
- Position: Cornerback

Personal information
- Born: May 28, 1981 (age 45); Anaheim, California, U.S.
- Listed height: 6 ft 1 in (1.85 m)
- Listed weight: 198 lb (90 kg)

Career information
- College: Southern California
- NFL draft: 2004: undrafted

Career history
- Baltimore Ravens (2004)*; Jacksonville Jaguars (2004-2005)*
- * Offseason or practice squad member only

Marcell Allmond
Medal record

Men's Track and Field

Representing United States

Pan American Junior Athletics Championships
Silver medal – second place	1999 Tampa	Decathlon

Marcell Allmond (born May 28, 1981) is an American football cornerback.

== Early life ==
Allmond played high school football at St. Paul High in Santa Fe Springs, California, where he also ran on the track and field team, along with brother Tony. He was the CIF California State Meet champion in the 110 metres hurdles both in 1998 and 1999. In 1999, he added a 6th place in the 300 hurdles, while his brother got 4th in the long jump, combining for the school's best showing at the meet.

Later in the year, he finished second, less than 100 points behind future Olympic Gold Medalist Bryan Clay in the decathlon at the 1999 Pan American Junior Athletics Championships.

== College career ==
Allmond played college football at the University of Southern California and was part of their 2003 national championship team. He was a three-year starter at cornerback and wide receiver.

== Professional career ==
After going undrafted, Allmond was on the Baltimore Ravens practice squad in 2004. He played for the Jacksonville Jaguars in 2005.
