= 1999 Pan American Junior Athletics Championships =

X Pan American Junior Athletics Championships
- Dates: July 9–11
- Host city: Tampa, United States
- Level: Junior
- Events: 43
- Participation: about 330 athletes from 29 nations

The 10th Pan American Junior Athletics Championships were held in Tampa, Florida, on July 9–11, 1999.

== Participation (unofficial) ==
Detailed result lists can be found on the CFPI and on the "World Junior Athletics History" website. An unofficial count yields the number of about 330 athletes from about 29 countries: Antigua and Barbuda (3), Argentina (6), Bahamas (11), Barbados (8), Bermuda (1), Belize (1), Brazil (18), British Virgin Islands (2), Canada (61), Cayman Islands (3), Chile (20), Colombia (7), Costa Rica (1), Dominica (2), Ecuador (4), El Salvador (2), Grenada (4), Guatemala (5), Guyana (2), Jamaica (32), Mexico (13), Panama (1), Peru (4), Puerto Rico (12), Trinidad and Tobago (8), Turks and Caicos Islands (10), United States (78), U.S. Virgin Islands (2), Venezuela (9).

== Medal summary ==
Medal winners are published. Complete results can be found on the CFPI and on the "World Junior Athletics History" website.

=== Men ===
Event	Gold		Silver		Bronze	
100 metres	Dwight Thomas (JAM)	10.37	Marquis Davis (USA)	10.38	James Shelton (USA)	10.49
200 metres	Dwight Thomas (JAM)	20.66	Marquis Davis (USA)	20.93	Jermaine Joseph (CAN)	21.40
400 metres	Sanjay Ayre (JAM)	46.14	William Hernández (VEN)	46.87	Liam Card (CAN)	47.16
800 metres	Jonathan Stevens (USA)	1:49.57	Moses Washington (USA)	1:49.77	Achraf Tadili (CAN)	1:49.78
1500 metres	Andrew Powell (USA)	4:04.07	Ryan Hayden (CAN)	4:04.42	Sebastián González Cabot (ARG)	4:04.81
5000 metres	Paul Morrison (CAN)	14:57.03	Daniel Parris (USA)	14:57.89	Michael Smith (USA)	14:59.76
10,000 metres	Jesse Thomas (USA)	31:15.63	Jonathan Morales (MEX)	31:18.22	Adam Wallace (USA)	31:45.79
3000 metres steeplechase	Joel Atwater (USA)	9:10.79	Gabe Olchin (USA)	9:25.74	Freddy Velázquez (GUA)	9:28.48
110 metres hurdles	Ricardo Moody (USA)	13.87	Reginald Harrell (USA)	14.24	Marvin Williams (JAM)	14.36
400 metres hurdles	Rickey Harris (USA)	50.56	LaTarence Dunbar (USA)	51.03	Ryan Clarke (JAM)	51.10
4 × 100 metres relay	United States; James Shelton; Tomas Alexander; L'Eron George; Marquis Davis	39.78	Jamaica; Ryan Clarke; Michael Frater; Davion Spence; Omar Brown	40.27	Bahamas; Dion Frasier; Ron Frasier; Barton Duncanson; Jehue Poitier	41.00
4 × 400 metres relay	Jamaica; Brandon Simpson; Dawn Thomas; Franz Bernard; Sanjay Ayre	3:06.25	United States; Curtis Pressley; Shomary McKenzie; Rickey Harris; Moses Washington	3:07.61	Canada; Chris Wiliams; Liam Card; Andre Lucas; Ashraf Tadili	3:10.01
10,000 metres track walk	Cristián David Berdeja (MEX)	44:30.65	Román Criollo (ECU)	44:49.64	Tristan Ruoss (USA)	46:34.19
High jump	Jessé de Lima (BRA)	2.21	Brandon Campbell (USA)	2.16	Kevin Cumberbatch (BAR)	2.10
Pole vault	Rocky Danners (USA)	5.08	Ricardo Pallares (MEX)	4.90	Lowell Dennis (USA)	4.60
Long jump	Leevan Sands (BAH)	7.48	Ryan Olkowski (USA)	7.37	Robert Jordan (USA)	7.24
Triple jump	Greg Yeldell (USA)	16.08	Leevan Sands (BAH)	16.00	Jadel Gregório (BRA)	15.90
Shot put	Simon Stewart (USA)	17.08	Dylan Armstrong (CAN)	16.16	Mateus Monari (BRA)	15.83
Discus throw	Lucais MacKay (USA)	51.49	Christian Cantwell (USA)	49.91	Dylan Armstrong (CAN)	49.03
Hammer throw	Dylan Armstrong (CAN)	65.63	Jake Freeman (USA)	64.84	Nicholas Welihozkiy (USA)	59.68
Javelin throw	Ryan Smith (USA)	67.40	Richard Rock (BAR)	67.01	Manuel Fuenmayor (VEN)	65.83
Decathlon	Bryan Clay (USA)	7207	Marcell Allmond (USA)	7111	Maurice Smith (JAM)	6996

=== Women ===
Event	Gold		Silver		Bronze	
100 metres	Aleen Bailey (JAM)	11.49	Lisa Sharpe (JAM)	11.61	Alexis Joyce (USA)	11.64
200 metres	Aleen Bailey (JAM)	23.48	Amber Robinson (USA)	23.51	Aleah Williams (USA)	23.84
400 metres	Norma González (COL)	52.43	Naleya Downer (JAM)	52.82	Nakiya Johnson (USA)	52.85
800 metres	Ysanne Williams (USA)	2:05.41	Tanya Wright (CAN)	2:06.37	Lindsay Hyatt (USA)	2:06.49
1500 metres	Bethany Brewster (USA)	4:24.98	Alejandra Barrientos (USA)	4:25.65	Stephanie Bennett (CAN)	4:30.14
3000 metres	Sara Gorton (USA)	9:33.98	Madai Pérez (MEX)	9:38.44	Victoria Chang (USA)	9:41.58
5000 metres	Madai Pérez (MEX)	16:50.77	Janill Williams (ATG)	17:00.51	Lucélia Peres (BRA)	17:03.56
100 metres hurdles	Ashlee Williams (USA)	13.78	Nichole Denby (USA)	13.82	Maíla Machado (BRA)	13.92
400 metres hurdles	Lashinda Demus (USA)	57.04	Patricia Hall (JAM)	57.65	Andrea Bliss (JAM)	57.94
4 × 100 metres relay	United States; Alexis Joyce; Aleah Williams; Amber Robinson; Amaris Buchanan	43.38	Jamaica; Elva Goulbourne; Aleen Bailey; Veronica Campbell; Lisa Sharpe	43.69	Bahamas; Juanita Ferguson; Shakira Pinto; Karen McCartney; Tamica Clarke	46.06
4 × 400 metres relay	United States; Faith Rein; Tracey Ball; Michele Davis; Nakiya Johnson	3:34.65	Jamaica; Andrea Bliss; Naleya Downer; Shauna-Kay Campbell; Karen Gayle	3:37.28	Colombia; Rosibel García; Sira Córdoba; Norma González; Digna Luz Murillo	3:44.79
5000 metres track walk	Robyn Stevens (USA)	24:42.96	Mabel Oncebay (PER)	24:43.03	Zoila Reyes (GUA)	25:13.97
High jump	Sheree Francis (JAM)	1.83	Whitney Evans (CAN); Jorgelina Rodríguez (ARG)	1.77		
Pole vault	Tracy O'Hara (USA)	3.93	Fabiana Murer (BRA)	3.75	Kathleen Donoghue (USA)	3.65
Long jump	Elva Goulbourne (JAM)	6.31	Nolle Graham (JAM)	5.88	Gisele de Oliveira (BRA)	5.84
Triple jump	Shelly-Ann Gallimore (JAM)	13.41	Gisele de Oliveira (BRA)	13.34	Bianca Rockett (USA)	12.77
Shot put	Jillian Camarena (USA)	15.25	Candice Scott (TRI)	14.16	Leomelina Blandón (COL)	14.08
Discus throw	Deshaya Williams (USA)	52.74	Mandy Borschowa (USA)	49.34	Melissa Gibbons (JAM)	47.27
Hammer throw	Maureen Griffin (USA)	55.78	Nathalie Thenor (CAN)	54.54	Melissa Houston (USA)	52.78
Javelin throw	Kathryn Polansky (USA)	48.29	Katy Doyle (USA)	47.21	Deanna Zelinka (CAN)	43.59
Heptathlon	Ellannee Richardson (USA)	5438	Kendra Reimer (USA)	5177	Valeria Schönstedt (CHI)	4999

== Medal table (unofficial) ==
* Host nation (United States)

Rank	Nation	Gold	Silver	Bronze	Total
1	United States*	27	19	15	61
2	Jamaica	9	7	5	21
3	Canada	2	5	7	14
4	Mexico	2	3	0	5
5	Brazil	1	2	5	8
6	Bahamas	1	1	2	4
7	Colombia	1	0	2	3
8	Argentina	0	1	1	2
8	Barbados	0	1	1	2
8	Venezuela	0	1	1	2
11	Ecuador	0	1	0	1
11	Netherlands Antilles	0	1	0	1
11	Peru	0	1	0	1
11	Trinidad and Tobago	0	1	0	1
15	Guatemala	0	0	2	2
16	Chile	0	0	1	1
Totals (16 entries)		43	44	42	129
