= Gisele de Oliveira =

Brazilian triple jumper

Personal information
- Full name: Gisele Lima de Oliveira
- Nationality: Brazil
- Born: August 1, 1980 (age 45) Porto Alegre, Rio Grande do Sul
- Height: 1.60 m (5 ft 3 in)
- Weight: 57 kg (126 lb)

Sport
- Sport: Athletics
Medal record
Women's Athletics
Representing Brazil
South American Youth Championships
Gold medal – first place	1994 Cochabamba	Long jump
Gold medal – first place	1996 Asunción	Long jump
- Updated on 10 May 2014

Gisele Lima de Oliveira (born 1 August 1980 in Porto Alegre, Rio Grande do Sul) is a Brazilian triple jumper.

== Career ==
In the NCAA, de Oliveira was a five-time All-American representing the Clemson Tigers track and field team.

She finished eighth in the 2008 World Athletics Final, and also competed at the 2008 Olympic Games without reaching the final.

== Personal bests ==
Her personal best jump is 14.28 metres, achieved in April 2008 in São Paulo. She also has 6.66 metres in the long jump, achieved in May 2008 in Cochabamba.

- Long jump: 6.66 m (wind: +0.0 m/s) – (Bolivia) Cochabamba, 31 May 2008
- Triple jump: 14.28 m (wind: -0.9 m/s) – (Brazil) São Paulo, 16 April 2008

== Achievements ==
Year	Competition	Venue	Position	Event	Notes
Representing Brazil
1994	South American Youth Championships	Cochabamba, Bolivia	1st	Long jump	5.85 m A
1996	South American Youth Championships	Asunción, Paraguay	1st	Long jump	5.71 m
1997	South American Junior Championships	San Carlos, Uruguay	1st	Long jump	5.74 m
1997	South American Junior Championships	San Carlos, Uruguay	2nd	Triple jump	12.14 m
1997	Pan American Junior Championships	Havana, Cuba	5th	Long jump	5.95 (wind: +0.5 m/s)
1998	South American Junior Championships	Córdoba, Argentina	1st	Long jump	6.16 m
1998	South American Junior Championships	Córdoba, Argentina	1st	Triple jump	12.74 m
1998	World Junior Championships	Annecy, France	14th (q)	Long jump	6.18 m (wind: +1.9 m/s)
1999	Pan American Junior Championships	Tampa, United States	3rd	Long jump	5.84 m
1999	Pan American Junior Championships	Tampa, United States	2nd	Triple jump	13.34 m
1999	South American Junior Championships	Concepción, Chile	1st	Long jump	6.22 m
1999	South American Junior Championships	Concepción, Chile	1st	Triple jump	12.88 m
2004	Ibero-American Championships	Huelva, Spain	5th	Triple jump	12.92 m
2005	South American Championships	Cali, Colombia	1st	Triple jump	13.90 m
2006	Ibero-American Championships	Ponce, Puerto Rico	3rd	Triple jump	13.35 m
2008	Olympic Games	Beijing, China	23rd (q)	Triple jump	13.81 m
2008	World Athletics Final	Stuttgart, Germany	8th	Triple jump	13.55 m (wind: +1.4 m/s)
2009	World Championships	Berlin, Germany	12th	Triple jump	13.19 m
2010	World Indoor Championships	Doha, Qatar	10th (q)	Triple jump	13.81 m
2010	Ibero-American Championships	San Fernando, Spain	4th	Triple jump	13.83 m
2011	South American Championships	Buenos Aires, Argentina	3rd	Triple jump	13.43 m
2012	World Indoor Championships	Istanbul, Turkey	22nd (q)	Triple jump	13.60 m
2012	Ibero-American Championships	Barquisimeto, Venezuela	2nd	Triple jump	13.46 m
2014	South American Games	Santiago, Chile	2nd	Triple jump	13.08 m
2014	Ibero-American Championships	São Paulo, Brazil	2nd	Triple jump	13.71 m
