= Adriana Muñoz (athlete) =

Cuban middle-distance runner

Personal information
- Full name: Adriana Muñoz Premier
- Born: 16 March 1982 (age 44) Santiago de Cuba
- Height: 1.62 m (5 ft 4 in)
- Weight: 51 kg (112 lb)

Sport
- Country: Cuba
- Sport: Athletics
Medal record
Women's athletics
Representing Cuba
Pan American Games
Gold medal – first place	2003 Santo Domingo	800 m
Gold medal – first place	2003 Santo Domingo	1500 m
Gold medal – first place	2011 Guadalajara	800 m
Gold medal – first place	2011 Guadalajara	1500 m
- Updated on 1 January 2015

Adriana Muñoz Premier (Note: In this Spanish name, the first or paternal surname is Muñoz and the second or maternal family name is Premier.) (born 16 March 1982) is a Cuban middle-distance runner who specialized in the 800 and 1500 metres.

At the Pan American Games she won gold medals in both events, the latter in a career best time of 4:09.57 minutes. She also competed in 800 metres at the 2003 World Championships, but without reaching the final.

== Personal bests ==
Her personal best 800 metres time as 2:00.10 minutes, achieved in June 2004 in Havana.

- 400 m: 54.78 s – (Cuba) La Habana, 29 June 2012
- 800 m: 2:00.10 min – (Cuba) La Habana, 25 June 2004
- 1000 m: 2:37.28 min – (Cuba) La Habana, 23 September 2011
- 1500 m: 4:09.57 min NR – (Dominican Republic) Santo Domingo, 7 August 2003
- 3000 m: 9:34.64 min – (Spain) San Fernando, 6 June 2010

== Competition record ==
Year	Competition	Venue	Position	Event	Notes
Representing Cuba
2001	Pan American Junior Championships	Santa Fe, Argentina	1st	1500 m	4:36.73
2003	Pan American Games	Santo Domingo, Dominican Republic	1st	800 m	2:02.96
2003	Pan American Games	Santo Domingo, Dominican Republic	1st	1500 m	4:09.57
2003	Pan American Games	Santo Domingo, Dominican Republic	5th	4 × 400 m	3:28.79
2003	World Championships	Paris, France	29th (h)	800 m	2:04.58
2005	Central American and Caribbean Championships	Nassau, Bahamas	5th	800 m	2:04.17
2010	Ibero-American Championships	San Fernando, Spain	4th	1500 m	4:15.21
2010	Ibero-American Championships	San Fernando, Spain	9th	3000 m	9:34.64
2011	ALBA Games	Barquisimeto, Venezuela	1st	800 m	2:02.55
2011	ALBA Games	Barquisimeto, Venezuela	1st	1500 m	4:23.28
2011	Pan American Games	Guadalajara, Mexico	1st	800 m	2:04.08
2011	Pan American Games	Guadalajara, Mexico	1st	1500 m	4:26.09
2012	Ibero-American Championships	Barquisimeto, Venezuela	3rd	800 m	2:03.72
2012	Ibero-American Championships	Barquisimeto, Venezuela	1st	1500 m	4:20.36
2013	Central American and Caribbean Championships	Morelia, Mexico	2nd	1500 m	4:31.79
2014	Central American and Caribbean Games	Xalapa, Mexico	3rd	1500m	4:20.50 A
2015	Pan American Games	Toronto, Canada	–	1500 m	DNF
