= Jonathan Stevens =

British researcher (1977–2013)

Jonathan Stevens (6 January 1977 - 27 December 2013), known as "Dr. Jonny", studied Human Genetics and Biology at Oxford, and worked in medical research. He was diagnosed with Parkinson's at the age of 33. He was a British medical researcher and campaigner for people with Parkinson's disease. He collapsed and died at Christmas 2013. A post mortem found that he had an undiagnosed congenital heart defect. A photography competition now runs in his memory as he himself had a keen interest in photography, which he continued to explore even after his Parkinson's diagnosis.
