= Sara Palmas =

Italian runner

Personal information
- Nationality: Italian
- Born: 7 July 1977 (age 48) Nuoro
- Height: 1.60 m (5 ft 3 in)
- Weight: 48 kg (106 lb)

Sport
- Country: Italy (10 caps)
- Sport: Athletics
- Event(s): Middle-distance running Long-distance running
- Club: G.S. Esercito

Achievements and titles
- Personal bests: 800 m: 2:04.59 (2004); 1500 m: 4:12.13 (2001); Half marathon: 1:31:56 (2012)
Medal record
World Military Cross Country C'ships
Silver medal – second place	2006 Tunis	Team

Sara Palmas (born 7 July 1977) is a former Italian female middle and long-distance runner who competed at one edition of the IAAF World Cross Country Championships at senior level (2001).

== Biography ==
She won silver medal with the national team at the World Military Cross Country Championships held in 2006 in Tunis and 12 national championships at senior level. She also finished top 8 in a competition at the highest level outside of the Olympic Games and world championships, more precisely at the European Athletics Indoor Championships individual events, she was 7th at the 2002 European Athletics Indoor Championships held in Vienna in the 1500 metres.

== Achievements ==
Year	Competition	Venue	Position	Event	Time	Notes
2002	European Indoor Championships	(Austria) Vienna	7th	1500 m	4:13.21	PB

== National titles ==
- Italian Athletics Championships
  - 1500 m: 2001, 2002, 2003 (3)
  - Cross country running (short race): 2001 (1)
- Italian Athletics Indoor Championships
  - 800 m: 1999, 2001 (2)
  - 1500 m: 2000, 2001, 2002, 2005, 2007, 2011 (6)
