= Marian Burnett =

Guyanese middle-distance runner

Personal information
- Born: 22 February 1976 (age 50) Linden, Guyana

Sport
- Sport: Track and field
- Club: LSU Tigers
Medal record
Representing Guyana
Pan American Games
| Silver medal – second place | 2003 Santo Domingo | 800 m |
South American Championships
| Gold medal – first place | 2007 São Paulo | 800 m |
| Silver medal – second place | 2007 São Paulo | 1500 m |

Marian Joan Burnett (born 22 February 1976) is a female middle-distance runner from Guyana who specialises in the 800 metres. She competed in the 2004 and 2008 Summer Olympic Games, reaching the second heat of the 800 metres on both occasions.

She won her first international medal at the 1999 Central American and Caribbean Championships in Athletics, where she finished third in the 1500 metres. She went to study at Louisiana State University and, representing the LSU Lady Tigers track and field team, she took the 800 m NCAA indoor title in 2002. She competed for Guyana at the 2003 Pan American Games and after initially finishing third in the 800 m, she was promoted to the silver medal after event winner Letitia Vriesde was disqualified for excessive caffeine use.

The following year she took part in the 2004 IAAF World Indoor Championships and also reached the semi-finals of the women's 800 m at the 2004 Athens Olympics. She attended the 2005 World Championships in Athletics but failed to progress beyond the heats. In 2006, after another appearance on the World Indoor stage, she reached the semi-finals of the 2006 Commonwealth Games. She went on to win her first continental title the next year, beating all opposition in the 800 m for a gold medal at the 2007 South American Championships in Athletics, and also won a silver medal in the 1500 m with a national record time. She reached the semi-finals of her event at the 2007 World Championships a few months later.

Burnett set an indoor national record of 2:02.27 for the 800 m at the 2008 IAAF World Indoor Championships, although this was not enough to reach the final. She made her second Olympic appearance at the 2008 Beijing Games, being eliminated in the heats, and reached the semi-finals at the 2009 World Championships in Athletics.

== Competition record ==
| Year | Competition | Venue | Position | Event | Notes |
Representing Guyana
| 1998 | Central American and Caribbean Games | Maracaibo, Venezuela | 12th (h) | 800 m | 2:14.58 |
| 1998 | Central American and Caribbean Games | Maracaibo, Venezuela | 6th | 1500 m | 4:44.71 |
| 1999 | Central American and Caribbean Championships | Bridgetown, Barbados | 3rd | 1500 m | 4:35.56 |
| 2001 | Central American and Caribbean Championships | Guatemala City, Guatemala | 4th | 800 m | 2:08.29 |
| 2002 | Commonwealth Games | Manchester, United Kingdom | 10th (sf) | 800 m | 2:03.52 |
| 2003 | Pan American Games | Santo Domingo, Dominican Republic | 2nd | 800 m | 2:03.58 |
| 2004 | World Indoor Championships | Budapest, Hungary | 11th (h) | 800 m | 2:04.48 (iNR) |
| 2004 | Olympic Games | Athens, Greece | 22nd (sf) | 800 m | 2:02.21 |
| 2005 | World Championships | Helsinki, Finland | 33rd (h) | 800 m | 2:09.88 |
| 2006 | World Indoor Championships | Moscow, Russia | 19th (h) | 800 m | 2:07.18 |
| 2006 | Commonwealth Games | Melbourne, Australia | 15th (sf) | 800 m | 2:07.13 |
| 2006 | Central American and Caribbean Games | Cartagena, Colombia | 4th | 800 m | 2:06.20 |
| 2007 | South American Championships | São Paulo, Brazil | 1st | 800 m | 2:03.57 |
| 2007 | South American Championships | São Paulo, Brazil | 2nd | 1500 m | 4:20.69 (NR) |
| 2007 | Pan American Games | Rio de Janeiro, Brazil | 4th | 800 m | 2:00.40 |
| 2007 | Pan American Games | Rio de Janeiro, Brazil | 4th | 1500 m | 4:17.91 (NR) |
| 2007 | World Championships | Osaka, Japan | 20th (sf) | 800 m | 2:01.02 |
| 2008 | World Indoor Championships | Valencia, Spain | 8th (sf) | 800 m | 2:02.27 (iNR) |
| 2008 | Olympic Games | Beijing, China | 23rd (h) | 800 m | 2:02.02 |
| 2009 | World Championships | Berlin, Germany | 21st (sf) | 800 m | 2:02.75 |
| 2010 | Central American and Caribbean Games | Mayagüez, Puerto Rico | 3rd | 800 m | 2:04.45 |
| 2010 | Central American and Caribbean Games | Mayagüez, Puerto Rico | 4th | 1500 m | 4:22.56 |

== Personal bests ==
| Event | Time (min) | Venue | Date |
|---|---|---|---|
| 400 m | 53.76 | Baton Rouge, Louisiana, United States | 21 May 2007 |
| 800 m | 1:59.47 | Palo Alto, California, United States | 31 May 2004 |
| 800 m (indoor) | 2:02.27 | Valencia, Spain | 8 March 2008 |
| 1500 m | 4:17.91 | Rio de Janeiro, Brazil | 27 July 2007 |

- All information taken from IAAF profile.
