= Jen Toomey =

American middle-distance runner

Jennifer "Jen" Toomey (born December 19, 1971) is an American middle-distance runner who won three US national titles, broke an American record, and was a world ranked runner from 2001 to 2006.

== Career ==
Toomey, now Boyd, grew up in Connecticut, graduated from Tufts University with a degree in Biology, and was later based in Salem. In high school, she had quit her track team hating the sport. Almost ten years later, she took up running seriously in 1999 after training for the Boston Marathon and by 2001 had a third-place finish in the USA Outdoor Track & Field Championships.

In February 2004 she broke the US indoor record for 1,000m in Birmingham, England, making her the 4th fastest woman all-time in this event. She won her first US indoor titles in 2004, winning the 800m final in 2:00.02 and the 1500m final in 4:09.82, the first female athlete to accomplish this double. She won the 1500m again in 2005.

With an outdoor 800m personal best of 1:59.75 outdoors and 1:59:64 indoors, gained in 2003 and 2004 respectively, Toomey was regarded as one of the best 800-meter runners in the world in the mid-2000s.

She finished second in the 1500m at the US Olympic trials but was prevented from competing in the 2004 Athens Olympics by a knee injury and an adductor strain. She subsequently relocated to Flagstaff, Arizona, where she worked with coach Jack Daniels. She returned to competition, clocking personal bests at 1500m in 2005 (indoors) and a mile in 2006 (outdoors), but had to again take a break due to injuries including stress fractures in both feet, and a torn meniscus. She returned to Salem and her old coach Tom McDermott, and made a competitive comeback in 2008.
