= Josiane Tito =

Brazilian sprinter (born 1979)

Personal information
- Full name: Josiane da Silva Tito
- Nationality: Brazil
- Born: 8 August 1979 (age 47) Rio de Janeiro, Brazil
- Height: 1.67 m (5 ft 5 1/2 in)
- Weight: 55 kg (121 lb)

Sport
- Sport: Athletics
- Event: Middle distance running
- Club: Unoeste

Achievements and titles
- Personal bests: 400 m: 53.05 s (2007); 800 m 2:01.28 (2007)
Medal record
Women's athletics
Representing Brazil
Pan American Games
Bronze medal – third place	2003 Santo Domingo	4x400m relay
Ibero-American Championships
Gold medal – first place	2004 Huelva	4×400 m relay
Silver medal – second place	2008 Iquique	4×400 m relay
South American Youth Championships
Gold medal – first place	1994 Cochabamba	4x400 m relay
Silver medal – second place	1994 Cochabamba	400 m
- Updated on 11 May 2013

Josiane da Silva Tito (born August 8, 1979, in Rio de Janeiro) is a Brazilian sprinter and middle-distance runner.

== Career ==
She set a personal best time of 2:01.28 for the 800 metres at the 2007 Pan American Games, coincidentally in her home city. Tito also competed as part of the women's national sprint team for the 4 × 400 m relay at the 2004 Summer Olympics in Athens.

At the 2008 Summer Olympics in Beijing, Tito competed for the second time in women's 4 × 400 m relay, along with her teammates Lucimar Teodoro, Maria Laura Almirão, and Emmily Pinheiro. She ran on the second leg of the second heat, with an individual-split time of 52.60 seconds. Tito and her team finished the relay in sixth place for a total time of 3:30.10, failing to advance into the final.

Few days before the 2009 IAAF World Championships in Berlin, Tito was among the five Brazilian athletes who failed the competition drug test for a banned substance recombinant EPO. She served a two-year suspension by IAAF, making her ineligible to compete for other international events, including the world and national championships.

== Achievements ==
Year	Competition	Venue	Position	Event	Notes
Representing Brazil
1994	South American Youth Championships	Cochabamba, Bolivia	2nd	400 m	57.71 s A
1994	South American Youth Championships	Cochabamba, Bolivia	1st	4 × 400 m relay	3:53.14 min A
1998	World Junior Championships	Annecy, France	6th	800m	2:07.52
