= Kenia Sinclair =

Jamaican middle-distance runner

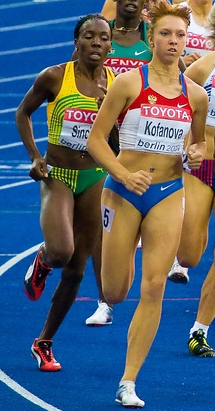
- Sinclair (yellow shirt) at the 2009 World Championships

Personal information
- Born: 14 July 1980 (age 46) Saint Catherine Parish, Jamaica

Sport
- Sport: Track and field
Medal record
Representing Jamaica
World Indoor Championships
Silver medal – second place	2006 Moscow	800m
Commonwealth Games
Silver medal – second place	2006 Melbourne	800m

Kenia Marsha Sinclair (born 14 July 1980) is a Jamaican athlete competing over 800 metres.

Sinclair competed in the NJCAA for Essex County College in Newark, New Jersey. She then ran for the Seton Hall Pirates track and field team.

Kenia first broke onto the international scene in 2005. On 12 June Sinclair broke Inez Turner's 10-year-old record to become the 5th Jamaican woman to go under two minutes. Less than a month later Kenia again broke the Jamaican record lowering the mark to 1.58.88. Kenia narrowly missed out on reaching the 800m final at the 2005 IAAF World Championships after finishing 3rd in her semi-final. In early 2006 Sinclair gained a silver in the IAAF World Indoor Championships breaking the Jamaican Indoor Record. In March at the 2006 Commonwealth Games Kenia earned a silver medal beating her hero Maria de Lurdes Mutola and once again breaking the national record. Kenia set her most recent National record of 1:57.88 in Crete, Greece. At the 2007 IAAF World Championships Kenia was once again knocked out in the semi-finals but many believe her performance was affected by the death of her coach. Kenia Sinclair is one of Jamaica greatest ever 800m runners and has broken the barriers of Jamaican female middle-distance running. Kenia made the 2008 Olympic 800m final but she mistimed her run and finished 6th with a season's best of 1:58.24.

In 2020, Sinclair joined the United States Air Force.

== Achievements ==
Year	Competition	Venue	Position	Event	Notes
Representing Jamaica
2003	Central American and Caribbean Championships	St. George's, Grenada	2nd	800 m	
2006	World Indoor Championships	Moscow, Russia	2nd	800 m	
2006	Commonwealth Games	Melbourne, Australia	2nd	800 m	1:58.16 PB NR
2010	Continental Cup	Split, Croatia	2nd	800 m	1:58.16
