= Mary Jayne Harrelson =

American distance runner

Personal information
- Born: June 17, 1978 (age 48) Roxboro, North Carolina, U.S.

Sport
- College team: Appalachian State
Medal record
Women's Athletics
Representing the United States
Pan American Games
Silver medal – second place	2003 Santo Domingo	1500 m
Silver medal – second place	2007 Rio de Janeiro	1500 m
NACAC Championships
Gold medal – first place	2007 San Salvador	1500 m
Gold medal – first place	2007 San Salvador	800 m
Representing the Appalachian State Mountaineers
NCAA Outdoor Championships
Gold medal – first place	1999 Boise	1500 m
Gold medal – first place	2001 Eugene	1500 m
Silver medal – second place	2001 Eugene	800 m

Mary Jayne Harrelson (married name Reeves; born June 17, 1978) is a female middle-distance runner from the United States. In college she was a two-time NCAA champion at Appalachian State and was later a two-time silver medalist at the Pan American Games.

== College career ==
Harrelson competed collegiately at Appalachian State University. She become one of the most accomplished athletes in SoCon history, winning 23 individual championships. She was a six-time All-American performer in outdoor track. In 1999 and 2001, Harrelson was the 1500 meters national champion at the NCAA outdoor track & field championships. In cross country, Harrelson was a conference champion three straight years (1998–2000) and qualified for the NCAA championships each of those seasons.

She was inducted into the Appalachian State Athletic Hall of Fame in 2006.
