= 2006 Ibero-American Championships in Athletics – Results =

These are the official results of the 2006 Ibero-American Championships in Athletics which took place on May 26–28, 2006 in Ponce, Puerto Rico.

== Men's results ==
=== 100 meters ===
Heats – May 26
Wind:
Heat 1: -1.0 m/s, Heat 2: +0.5 m/s

Rank	Heat	Name	Nationality	Time	Notes
1	2	Vicente de Lima	Brazil	10.30	Q
2	2	Kael Becerra	Chile	10.39	Q
3	2	Joel Báez	Dominican Republic	10.48	Q
4	1	Basílio de Moraes Júnior	Brazil	10.60	Q
5	1	Heber Viera	Uruguay	10.61	Q
6	1	Juan Pedro Toledo	Mexico	10.66	Q
7	2	Jhon Jairo Córdoba	Colombia	10.70	q
8	1	Daniel Grueso	Colombia	10.72	q
9	2	Mario Trillo	Mexico	10.74	
9	2	Jorge Luis Solórzano	Guatemala	10.74	
11	1	Iván Mocholí	Spain	10.80	
12	1	Carlos García	Dominican Republic	10.81	
13	1	Emilio Rivera	Puerto Rico	10.86	
14	2	Antonio Zovo	Angola	11.30	
	2	Yavid Zackey	Puerto Rico	DNF	
	1	Holder da Silva	Guinea-Bissau	DNS	

Final – May 26
Wind:
+0.3 m/s

Rank	Name	Nationality	Time	Notes
1st place, gold medalist(s)	Vicente de Lima	Brazil	10.22	
2nd place, silver medalist(s)	Kael Becerra	Chile	10.32	
3rd place, bronze medalist(s)	Heber Viera	Uruguay	10.45	
4	Juan Pedro Toledo	Mexico	10.45	
5	Joel Báez	Dominican Republic	10.48	
6	Basílio de Moraes Júnior	Brazil	10.49	
7	Daniel Grueso	Colombia	10.61	
8	Jhon Jairo Córdoba	Colombia	10.76	

=== 200 meters ===
Heats – May 28
Wind:
Heat 1: -1.6 m/s, Heat 2: -0.5 m/s

Rank	Heat	Name	Nationality	Time	Notes
1	2	Juan Pedro Toledo	Mexico	20.77	Q
2	2	Basílio de Moraes Júnior	Brazil	20.81	Q
3	2	Heber Viera	Uruguay	20.99	Q
4	1	Arismendy Peguero	Dominican Republic	21.22	Q
4	2	Juan Sainfleur	Dominican Republic	21.22	q
6	1	Vicente de Lima	Brazil	21.37	Q
7	1	Kael Becerra	Chile	21.61	Q
8	2	Angelo Edmund	Panama	21.64	q
9	1	Mario Trillo	Mexico	21.81	
10	1	Jorge Richardson	Puerto Rico	22.11	
11	1	Javier Mosquera	Colombia	22.33	
12	2	Nicolau Palanca	Angola	23.17	
13	1	Antonio Zovo	Angola	23.43	
	1	Holder da Silva	Guinea-Bissau	DNS	
	2	Yavid Zackey	Puerto Rico	DNS	

Final – May 28
Wind:
+1.8 m/s

Rank	Name	Nationality	Time	Notes
1st place, gold medalist(s)	Juan Pedro Toledo	Mexico	20.74	
2nd place, silver medalist(s)	Heber Viera	Uruguay	20.80	
3rd place, bronze medalist(s)	Basílio de Moraes Júnior	Brazil	20.84	
4	Kael Becerra	Chile	21.05	
5	Juan Sainfleur	Dominican Republic	21.07	
6	Arismendy Peguero	Dominican Republic	21.15	
7	Angelo Edmund	Panama	21.34	
	Vicente de Lima	Brazil	DQ	

=== 400 meters ===
Heats – May 26

Rank	Heat	Name	Nationality	Time	Notes
1	1	Andrés Silva	Uruguay	46.30	Q
2	2	Arismendy Peguero	Dominican Republic	46.48	Q
3	2	David Testa	Spain	46.86	Q
4	1	Yoel Tapia	Dominican Republic	47.05	Q
5	1	Angelo Edmund	Panama	47.16	Q
6	1	Christian Santiago	Puerto Rico	47.28	q
7	1	Anderson Jorge dos Santos	Brazil	47.42	q
8	1	Josner Rodríguez	Venezuela	47.51	
9	2	Félix Martínez	Puerto Rico	47.57	Q
10	2	Luís Ambrosio	Brazil	47.58	
11	1	Javier Mosquera	Colombia	47.73	
12	2	Takeshi Fujiwara	El Salvador	48.26	
13	2	Nicolau Palanca	Angola	50.61	

Final – May 27

Rank	Name	Nationality	Time	Notes
1st place, gold medalist(s)	Andrés Silva	Uruguay	45.35	
2nd place, silver medalist(s)	Arismendy Peguero	Dominican Republic	45.91	
3rd place, bronze medalist(s)	David Testa	Spain	46.46	
4	Yoel Tapia	Dominican Republic	46.48	
5	Anderson Jorge dos Santos	Brazil	47.09	
6	Angelo Edmund	Panama	47.12	
7	Félix Martínez	Puerto Rico	47.78	
8	Christian Santiago	Puerto Rico	49.07	

=== 800 meters ===
Heats – May 26

Rank	Heat	Name	Nationality	Time	Notes
1	1	Osmar dos Santos	Brazil	1:48.35	Q
2	1	Salvador Crespo	Spain	1:48.90	Q
3	1	Eduar Villanueva	Venezuela	1:49.55	Q
4	1	César Barquero	Peru	1:49.92	q
5	2	Fadrique Iglesias	Bolivia	1:50.04	Q
6	2	José Manuel Cortés	Spain	1:50.65	Q
7	2	Simoncito Silvera	Venezuela	1:50.68	Q
8	2	Jhon Chávez	Colombia	1:50.78	q
9	2	Leonardo Price	Argentina	1:50.81	
10	2	Frank Bobadilla	Dominican Republic	1:51.43	
11	2	José Vargas	Puerto Rico	1:51.52	
12	2	Jenner Pelicó	Guatemala	1:52.46	
13	1	Rodrigo Trinidad	Paraguay	1:53.18	
14	1	Víctor Martínez	Andorra	1:53.88	
	1	Diego Márquez	Puerto Rico	DNS	

Final – May 27

Rank	Name	Nationality	Time	Notes
1st place, gold medalist(s)	Osmar dos Santos	Brazil	1:46.22	
2nd place, silver medalist(s)	Fadrique Iglesias	Bolivia	1:48.16	NR
3rd place, bronze medalist(s)	Eduar Villanueva	Venezuela	1:48.31	
4	Jhon Chávez	Colombia	1:48.65	
5	Salvador Crespo	Spain	1:48.71	
6	César Barquero	Peru	1:49.15	
7	José Manuel Cortés	Spain	1:49.49	
8	Simoncito Silvera	Venezuela	1:50.12	

=== 1500 meters ===
May 28

Rank	Name	Nationality	Time	Notes
1st place, gold medalist(s)	Diego Ruiz	Spain	3:46.99	
2nd place, silver medalist(s)	Víctor Riobó	Spain	3:47.37	
3rd place, bronze medalist(s)	Luis Daniel Soto	Puerto Rico	3:47.48	
4	Hudson de Souza	Brazil	3:47.82	
5	Leonardo Price	Argentina	3:48.68	
6	Eduar Villanueva	Venezuela	3:48.72	
7	Javier Carriqueo	Argentina	3:48.77	
8	Miguel Ángel Orduña	Mexico	3:49.12	
9	Jhon Chávez	Colombia	3:49.32	
10	Sergio Lobos	Chile	3:49.39	
11	Fadrique Iglesias	Bolivia	3:49.82	
12	Juan Odalis Almonte	Dominican Republic	3:49.99	
13	Salvador Miranda	Mexico	3:53.15	
14	Frank Bobadilla	Dominican Republic	3:54.63	
15	Víctor Martínez	Andorra	3:56.35	
16	Antonio Domingos	Angola	4:13.79	
	David Freeman	Puerto Rico	DNF	
	Byron Piedra	Ecuador	DNS	

=== 3000 meters ===
May 27

Rank	Name	Nationality	Time	Notes
1st place, gold medalist(s)	Hudson de Souza	Brazil	8:08.62	
2nd place, silver medalist(s)	Javier Carriqueo	Argentina	8:09.20	
3rd place, bronze medalist(s)	Francisco España	Spain	8:09.43	
4	Hermano Ferreira	Portugal	8:10.48	
5	Juan Carlos Romero	Mexico	8:14.68	
6	Emilio Martín	Spain	8:14.99	
7	Miguel Ángel Orduña	Mexico	8:16.13	
8	Jonathan Monje	Chile	8:16.55	
9	Fernando Alex Fernandes	Brazil	8:24.90	
10	José Louvrenço	Angola	8:29.94	
11	Adrián Rodríguez	Puerto Rico	9:09.83	
12	Juan Odalis Almonte	Dominican Republic	9:22.04	
	David Freeman	Puerto Rico	DNF	
	Alexander Greaux	Puerto Rico	DNS	

=== 5000 meters ===
May 26

Rank	Name	Nationality	Time	Notes
1st place, gold medalist(s)	Marílson Gomes dos Santos	Brazil	13:42.88	
2nd place, silver medalist(s)	Álvaro Jiménez	Spain	14:03.37	
3rd place, bronze medalist(s)	José Rocha	Portugal	14:07.51	
4	Juan Carlos Romero	Mexico	14:15.57	
5	Javier Guarín	Colombia	14:22.49	
6	Luis Collazo	Puerto Rico	14:28.49	
7	José Louvrenço	Angola	14:31.08	
8	José Amado García	Guatemala	14:31.55	
9	César Lam	Puerto Rico	14:31.55	
10	Antonio Domingos	Angola	15:49.68	
11	Mario Pérez	Dominican Republic	15:59.26	
12	Jesús Ramírez	Dominican Republic	15:59.26	
	Byron Piedra	Ecuador	DNS	
	Silvio Guerra	Ecuador	DNS	

=== 110 meters hurdles ===
Heats – May 28
Wind:
Heat 1: -0.2 m/s, Heat 2: -2.0 m/s

Rank	Heat	Name	Nationality	Time	Notes
1	2	Anselmo da Silva	Brazil	13.76	Q
2	1	Redelén dos Santos	Brazil	14.02	Q
3	1	Enrique Llanos	Puerto Rico	14.02	Q
4	1	Carlos Jorge	Dominican Republic	14.15	Q
5	2	Iban Maiza	Spain	14.24	Q
6	1	Norhiher Omar Marín	Mexico	14.58	q
6	2	Jonathan Davis	Venezuela	14.58	Q
8	1	Alejandro Olmedo	El Salvador	15.19	q
9	1	Hans Villagrán	Guatemala	15.58	
10	2	Gonzalo Barroilhet	Chile	15.81	

Final – May 28
Wind:
+1.2 m/s

Rank	Name	Nationality	Time	Notes
1st place, gold medalist(s)	Anselmo da Silva	Brazil	13.51	
2nd place, silver medalist(s)	Redelén dos Santos	Brazil	13.72	
3rd place, bronze medalist(s)	Enrique Llanos	Puerto Rico	13.86	
4	Iban Maiza	Spain	13.88	
5	Carlos Jorge	Dominican Republic	13.95	
6	Jonathan Davis	Venezuela	14.10	
7	Norhiher Omar Marín	Mexico	14.55	
8	Alejandro Olmedo	El Salvador	14.84	NR

=== 400 meters hurdles ===
Heats – May 26

Rank	Heat	Name	Nationality	Time	Notes
1	1	José María Romera	Spain	50.94	Q
2	2	Luis Montenegro	Chile	51.00	Q
3	1	Javier Culson	Puerto Rico	51.07	Q
4	2	Cleverson da Silva	Brazil	51.70	Q
5	1	Thiago Bueno	Brazil	51.84	Q
6	2	Hans Villagrán	Guatemala	52.12	Q, NJR
7	2	Jayson Ramos	Puerto Rico	52.33	q
8	2	Miguel García	Dominican Republic	52.33	q
9	1	Jonnie Lowe	Honduras	52.56	
10	1	Luis Alberto Constanzo	Dominican Republic	54.55	

Final – May 27

Rank	Name	Nationality	Time	Notes
1st place, gold medalist(s)	Javier Culson	Puerto Rico	49.71	
2nd place, silver medalist(s)	Luis Montenegro	Chile	50.22	
3rd place, bronze medalist(s)	José María Romera	Spain	50.84	
4	Cleverson da Silva	Brazil	51.01	
5	Thiago Bueno	Brazil	51.89	
6	Jayson Ramos	Puerto Rico	52.18	
7	Miguel García	Dominican Republic	52.43	
8	Hans Villagrán	Guatemala	53.54	

=== 3000 meters steeplechase ===
May 26

Rank	Name	Nationality	Time	Notes
1st place, gold medalist(s)	Alexander Greaux	Puerto Rico	8:35.89	
2nd place, silver medalist(s)	Fernando Alex Fernandes	Brazil	8:36.97	
3rd place, bronze medalist(s)	Francisco Javier Lara	Spain	8:37.78	
4	Sergio Lobos	Chile	8:44.75	
5	Salvador Miranda	Mexico	8:48.63	
6	Mariano Mastromarino	Argentina	8:54.92	
7	Johan Méndez	Puerto Rico	9:10.01	
8	Pep Sansa	Andorra	9:13.26	

=== 4 x 100 meters relay ===
May 28

Rank	Nation	Competitors	Time	Notes
1st place, gold medalist(s)	Dominican Republic	Irving Guerrero, Joel Báez, Juan Sainfleur, Carlos García	39.65	
2nd place, silver medalist(s)	Brazil	Anselmo da Silva, Basílio de Moraes Júnior, Vicente de Lima, Luís Ambrosio	40.52	
3rd place, bronze medalist(s)	Puerto Rico	Luis López, Roberto Rivera, Jorge Richardson, Emilio Rivera	40.59	

=== 4 x 400 meters relay ===
May 28

Rank	Nation	Competitors	Time	Notes
1st place, gold medalist(s)	Dominican Republic	Pedro Mejía, Juan Betances, Yoel Tapia, Arismendy Peguero	3:06.11	
2nd place, silver medalist(s)	Puerto Rico	Fabián Martínez, Javier Culson, Christian Santiago, Félix Martínez	3:07.27	
3rd place, bronze medalist(s)	Brazil	Luís Ambrosio, Sanderlei Parrela, Thiago Chyaromont, Anderson Jorge dos Santos	3:25.18	

=== 20,000 meters walk ===
May 28

Rank	Name	Nationality	Time	Notes
1st place, gold medalist(s)	Rolando Saquipay	Ecuador	1:28:48.36	
2nd place, silver medalist(s)	José Ignacio Díaz	Spain	1:30:43.27	
3rd place, bronze medalist(s)	Sérgio Galdino	Brazil	1:32:50.12	
4	Allan Segura	Costa Rica	1:34:31.85	
5	José David Domínguez	Spain	1:34:47.24	
6	Ezequiel Nazario	Puerto Rico	1:40:03.78	
7	Noel Santini	Puerto Rico	1:48:26.43	
	Julio René Martínez	Guatemala	DQ	

=== High jump ===
May 28

Rank	Name	Nationality	1.90	2.00	2.05	2.08	2.11	2.14	2.16	2.20	2.24	2.28	Result	Notes
1st place, gold medalist(s)	Jessé de Lima	Brazil	–	–	–	–	o	–	o	xo	xxo	xxx	2.24	
2nd place, silver medalist(s)	Gilmar Mayo	Colombia	–	–	–	–	–	o	–	xxo	xxx		2.20	
3rd place, bronze medalist(s)	Gerardo Martínez	Mexico	–	–	o	–	xo	xxo	xxo	xxx			2.16	
4	Enrique Márquez	Spain	–	–	o	o	o	xo	xxx				2.14	
5	Fábio Baptista	Brazil	–	–	o	–	xxo	xxo	xxx				2.14	
6	Santiago Guerci	Argentina	–	o	xxo	o	xxo	xxx					2.11	
7	Albert Bravo	Venezuela	–	–	–	xo	xxx						2.08	
8	Rafael Gonçalves	Portugal	–	o	o	xxo	xxx						2.08	
9	Omar Camacho	Puerto Rico	–	o	xxo	–	xxx						2.05	
	Alejandro Olmedo	El Salvador	xxx										NM	
	Abdiel Ruiz	Puerto Rico		xxx									NM	

=== Pole vault ===
May 27

Rank	Name	Nationality	4.60	4.75	4.90	5.05	5.15	5.25	5.35	5.45	5.55	5.65	5.70	5.81	Result	Notes
1st place, gold medalist(s)	Germán Chiaraviglio	Argentina	–	–	–	xo	–	o	o	o	x–	xo	xo	xxx	5.70	
2nd place, silver medalist(s)	Fábio Gomes da Silva	Brazil	–	–	–	–	–	o	–	o	o	xo	xxx		5.65	
3rd place, bronze medalist(s)	José Francisco Nava	Chile	–	–	–	o	o	o	xxx						5.25	
4	Javier Benítez	Argentina	–	–	–	o	xxo	xo	xxx						5.25	
5	João Gabriel Sousa	Brazil	–	–	–	o	xxx								5.05	
6	Abiexer Vega	Puerto Rico	o	xx–	x										4.60	
	Bernat Vilella	Andorra	xxx												NM	
	Jonathan Cosme	Puerto Rico													DNS	

=== Long jump ===
May 26

Rank	Name	Nationality	#1	#2	#3	#4	#5	#6	Result	Notes
1st place, gold medalist(s)	Irving Saladino	Panama	8.42	–	8.41	–	–	–	8.42	
2nd place, silver medalist(s)	Carlos Jorge	Dominican Republic	7.58	7.84	7.33	7.35	7.32	7.29	7.84	
3rd place, bronze medalist(s)	Allen Simms	Puerto Rico	x	7.52	7.58	x	6.17	7.67	7.67	
4	Rogério Bispo	Brazil	7.59	7.51	7.22	7.60	7.41	7.66	7.66	
5	Carlos Nieves	Puerto Rico	7.02	x	7.60	x	7.47	7.57	7.60	
6	Marco Antonio Ibarguen	Colombia	x	x	7.20	x	x	x	7.20	
7	Maxwell Álvarez	Guatemala	6.80	7.01	6.84	7.01	6.94	x	7.01	
	Hugo Chila	Ecuador							DNS	

=== Triple jump ===
May 28

Rank	Name	Nationality	#1	#2	#3	#4	#5	#6	Result	Notes
1st place, gold medalist(s)	Jefferson Sabino	Brazil	16.68	15.92	x	16.81	13.76	x	16.81	
2nd place, silver medalist(s)	Allen Simms	Puerto Rico	15.80	14.27	16.60	16.33	14.84	16.33	16.60	
3rd place, bronze medalist(s)	Leisner Aragón	Colombia	x	15.51	x	15.94	x	x	15.94	
4	Pere Joseph	Spain	15.56	15.50	15.71	15.77	x	x	15.77	
5	Maxwell Álvarez	Guatemala	14.95	15.31	x	x	x	15.15	15.31	
6	Marcos Sanz	Puerto Rico	15.11	15.06	14.92	15.20	15.12	15.17	15.20	
7	Juan Carlos Nájera	Guatemala	x	x	14.45	x	x	14.57	14.57	
8	Kessel Campbell	Honduras	14.19	x	14.42	14.42	x	14.34	14.42	NJR

=== Shot put ===
May 26

Rank	Name	Nationality	#1	#2	#3	#4	#5	#6	Result	Notes
1st place, gold medalist(s)	Yojer Medina	Venezuela	18.11	18.63	18.79	x	18.37	18.70	18.79	
2nd place, silver medalist(s)	Borja Vivas	Spain	18.17	18.04	18.15	18.24	18.66	x	18.66	
3rd place, bronze medalist(s)	Marco Antonio Verni	Chile	x	x	17.23	x	x	18.48	18.48	
4	Germán Lauro	Argentina	17.29	–	18.47	18.44	x	x	18.47	
5	Jhonny Rodríguez	Colombia	17.43	17.67	x	18.23	18.01	17.55	18.23	
6	Manuel Repollet	Puerto Rico	17.03	17.07	x	x	x	17.18	17.18	
7	Gustavo de Mendoça	Brazil	x	x	16.37	16.91	16.52	16.77	16.91	
8	Ronald Julião	Brazil	16.41	16.76	16.89	16.46	x	16.71	16.89	
9	José Ventura	Dominican Republic							15.51	

=== Discus throw ===
May 27

Rank	Name	Nationality	#1	#2	#3	#4	#5	#6	Result	Notes
1st place, gold medalist(s)	Jorge Balliengo	Argentina	x	47.37	55.70	x	54.89	59.62	59.62	
2nd place, silver medalist(s)	Marcelo Pugliese	Argentina	53.11	53.46	52.95	51.14	x	x	53.46	
3rd place, bronze medalist(s)	Héctor Hurtado	Venezuela	49.53	50.47	x	53.43	x	51.57	53.43	
4	Ronald Julião	Brazil	50.83	x	x	x	52.36	49.66	52.36	
5	Julián Angulo	Colombia	50.63	51.09	52.18	50.63	52.03	49.82	52.18	
6	Alfredo Romero	Puerto Rico	46.62	49.84	49.32	52.14	51.90	50.15	52.14	
7	Jorge Grave	Portugal	47.00	51.70	x	50.22	x	48.06	51.70	
8	Expedi Peña	Dominican Republic	46.99	50.12	x	49.43	50.34	45.44	50.34	
9	Urayoan Marcano	Puerto Rico	47.87	x	46.60				47.87	
10	Juan Infante	Dominican Republic	42.40	44.36	44.25				44.36	

=== Hammer throw ===
May 28

Rank	Name	Nationality	#1	#2	#3	#4	#5	#6	Result	Notes
1st place, gold medalist(s)	Juan Ignacio Cerra	Argentina	68.22	68.84	68.48	68.99	69.38	68.55	69.38	
2nd place, silver medalist(s)	Dário Manso	Portugal	65.00	69.17	66.90	x	x	x	69.17	
3rd place, bronze medalist(s)	Wagner Domingos	Brazil	66.06	65.06	65.21	x	61.92	63.37	66.06	
4	Patricio Palma	Chile	61.92	x	65.00	x	65.00	x	65.00	
5	Adrián Marzo	Argentina	x	61.43	x	x	64.29	x	64.29	
6	Pedro Muñoz	Venezuela	62.33	62.96	x	x	62.12	62.75	62.96	
7	Santos Vega	Puerto Rico	58.95	60.82	60.21	x	61.49	62.24	62.24	
8	Santiago Helena	Dominican Republic	56.97	x	x	51.94	x	55.96	56.97	
9	Eugenio Fiol	Puerto Rico	x	54.84	x				54.84	
10	Arturo Martínez	Dominican Republic	x	50.22	x				50.22	

=== Javelin throw ===
May 27

Rank	Name	Nationality	#1	#2	#3	#4	#5	#6	Result	Notes
1st place, gold medalist(s)	Júlio César de Oliveira	Brazil	72.81	71.61	74.36	76.31	x	78.91	78.91	
2nd place, silver medalist(s)	Luiz Fernando da Silva	Brazil	73.83	x	73.29	72.72	69.08	72.33	73.83	
3rd place, bronze medalist(s)	Pablo Pietrobelli	Argentina	72.50	69.51	68.43	70.03	67.88	68.05	72.50	
4	Rafael Baraza	Spain	67.01	71.57	x	71.80	67.53	67.67	71.80	
5	Diego Moraga	Chile	70.79	x	69.82	70.34	68.07	68.20	70.79	
6	Luis Guzmán	Mexico	68.53	x	x	65.14	x	–	68.53	
7	Rigoberto Calderón	Nicaragua	66.93	x	x	x	x	62.82	66.93	
8	Josue Burgos	Puerto Rico	58.84	x	55.51	x	56.81	x	58.84	
9	Julio Lojo	Puerto Rico	x	54.08	57.59				57.59	
10	José María Rodríguez	Dominican Republic	54.75	55.15	53.42				55.15	
	Noraldo Palacios	Colombia							DNS	

=== Decathlon ===
May 27–28

The highest mark recorded in each event is highlighted in yellow

Rank	Athlete	Nationality	100m	LJ	SP	HJ	400m	110m H	DT	PV	JT	1500m	Points	Notes
1st place, gold medalist(s)	Oscar González	Spain	11.24	7.11	13.29	2.02	49.72	14.79	41.68	4.40	45.24	4:38.12	7498	
2nd place, silver medalist(s)	David Gómez	Spain	11.34	6.90	13.26	1.93	50.79	14.96	39.96	4.20	61.82	4:42.25	7400	
3rd place, bronze medalist(s)	Jorge Naranjo	Chile	11.48	6.94	13.17	2.05	52.60	15.65	33.65	4.80	39.22	5:08.34	6886	
4	Enrique Aguirre	Argentina	11.38	6.38	13.37	1.99	51.74	15.53	37.82	NM	49.87	5:53.72	5952	
	Iván Scolfaro da Silva	Brazil	11.20	7.17	13.94	1.99	DNS	–	–	–	–	–	DNF	
	Andrés Horacio Mantilla	Colombia	11.39	6.45	13.41	1.90	DNS	–	–	–	–	–	DNF	
	Steven Marrero	Puerto Rico	11.49	6.50	13.75	1.84	DNS	–	–	–	–	–	DNF	
	Darwin Colón	Honduras	DNS	–	–	–	–	–	–	–	–	–	DNS	

== Women's results ==
=== 100 meters ===
Heats – May 26
Wind:
Heat 1: -1.6 m/s, Heat 2: -1.9 m/s

Rank	Heat	Name	Nationality	Time	Notes
1	1	Franciela Krasucki	Brazil	11.69	Q
2	1	Belén Recio	Spain	11.84	Q
3	1	María Carmona	Dominican Republic	11.94	Q
4	2	Yomara Hinestroza	Colombia	11.96	Q
5	1	Melisa Murillo	Colombia	11.98	q
6	2	Marleny Mejía	Dominican Republic	12.00	Q
7	2	Celiangeli Morales	Puerto Rico	12.01	Q
8	1	Roxana Mercado	Puerto Rico	12.05	q
9	2	Tathiana Ignácio	Brazil	12.13	
10	2	Sina Teresa	Angola	13.54	

Final – May 26
Wind:
-1.1 m/s

Rank	Name	Nationality	Time	Notes
1st place, gold medalist(s)	Franciela Krasucki	Brazil	11.61	
2nd place, silver medalist(s)	Belén Recio	Spain	11.66	
3rd place, bronze medalist(s)	Celiangeli Morales	Puerto Rico	11.72	
4	Marleny Mejía	Dominican Republic	11.74	
5	Melisa Murillo	Colombia	11.80	
6	Yomara Hinestroza	Colombia	11.82	
7	María Carmona	Dominican Republic	11.83	
8	Roxana Mercado	Puerto Rico	11.90	

=== 200 meters ===
Heats – May 28
Wind:
Heat 1: -0.5 m/s, Heat 2: -1.0 m/s

Rank	Heat	Name	Nationality	Time	Notes
1	1	Felipa Palacios	Colombia	23.53	Q
2	1	Darlenys Obregón	Colombia	23.76	Q
3	2	Belén Recio	Spain	23.81	Q
4	1	Ruth Grajeda	Mexico	23.96	q
5	2	Militza Castro	Puerto Rico	24.09	Q
6	2	Marleny Mejía	Dominican Republic	24.22	Q
7	1	Maria Laura Almirão	Brazil	24.30	Q
8	2	Geisa Coutinho	Brazil	24.32	q
9	1	Jennifer Gutiérrez	Puerto Rico	24.66	
10	2	Sina Teresa	Angola	27.48	

Final – May 28
Wind:
+0.7 m/s

Rank	Name	Nationality	Time	Notes
1st place, gold medalist(s)	Felipa Palacios	Colombia	23.03	
2nd place, silver medalist(s)	Darlenys Obregón	Colombia	23.23	
3rd place, bronze medalist(s)	Militza Castro	Puerto Rico	23.46	
4	Ruth Grajeda	Mexico	23.55	
5	Belén Recio	Spain	23.63	
6	Marleny Mejía	Dominican Republic	23.99	
7	Geisa Coutinho	Brazil	24.02	
8	Maria Laura Almirão	Brazil	24.65	

=== 400 meters ===
Heats – May 26

Rank	Heat	Name	Nationality	Time	Notes
1	2	Mayra González	Mexico	53.95	Q
2	2	Maria Laura Almirão	Brazil	54.05	Q
3	1	Geisa Coutinho	Brazil	54.22	Q
4	2	Norma González	Colombia	54.25	Q
5	1	Nallely Vela	Mexico	55.65	Q
6	1	Teresa Torres	Spain	55.66	Q
7	1	Lorena de la Rosa	Dominican Republic	55.70	q
8	2	Maritza Salas	Puerto Rico	55.95	q
9	1	Arelys Caro	Puerto Rico	56.84	
	2	Libia Jackson	Dominican Republic	DQ	
	2	Lucy Jaramillo	Ecuador	DNS	

Final – May 27

Rank	Name	Nationality	Time	Notes
1st place, gold medalist(s)	Norma González	Colombia	52.87	
2nd place, silver medalist(s)	Maria Laura Almirão	Brazil	53.61	
3rd place, bronze medalist(s)	Mayra González	Mexico	53.64	
4	Geisa Coutinho	Brazil	53.66	
5	Nallely Vela	Mexico	55.26	
6	Teresa Torres	Spain	55.57	
7	Maritza Salas	Puerto Rico	55.73	
8	Lorena de la Rosa	Dominican Republic	55.98	

=== 800 meters ===
May 27

Rank	Name	Nationality	Time	Notes
1st place, gold medalist(s)	Rosibel García	Colombia	2:01.62	
2nd place, silver medalist(s)	Gabriela Medina	Mexico	2:03.43	
3rd place, bronze medalist(s)	Lizaira del Valle	Puerto Rico	2:03.76	
4	Muriel Coneo	Colombia	2:05.83	NJR
5	Christiane dos Santos	Brazil	2:06.32	
6	Montserrat Mas	Spain	2:06.55	
7	Sonny García	Dominican Republic	2:14.55	
8	Evamarie Guzmán	Puerto Rico	2:16.30	

=== 1500 meters ===
May 28

Rank	Name	Nationality	Time	Notes
1st place, gold medalist(s)	Isabel Macías	Spain	4:21.65	
2nd place, silver medalist(s)	Lizaira del Valle	Puerto Rico	4:23.35	
3rd place, bronze medalist(s)	Angélica Sánchez	Mexico	4:25.73	
4	Christiane dos Santos	Brazil	4:30.67	
5	María Guadalupe Estrada	Mexico	4:30.71	
6	Sonny García	Dominican Republic	4:31.82	NR
7	Camila de Mello	Uruguay	4:32.69	
8	Beverly Ramos	Puerto Rico	4:32.82	
9	Luciana Cutaviengo	Angola	5:03.31	

=== 3000 meters ===
May 27

Rank	Name	Nationality	Time	Notes
1st place, gold medalist(s)	Jéssica Augusto	Portugal	9:06.74	
2nd place, silver medalist(s)	Lucélia Peres	Brazil	9:15.79	
3rd place, bronze medalist(s)	Bertha Sánchez	Colombia	9:19.04	NR
4	Zenaide Vieira	Brazil	9:20.58	
5	Gabriela Traña	Costa Rica	9:54.67	
6	Liomarys Herrera	Dominican Republic	10:14.24	
7	Beverly Ramos	Puerto Rico	10:16.46	
8	Luciana Cutaviengo	Angola	10:57.78	
9	Carmen Valdés	Puerto Rico	11:08.60	
	María Guadalupe Estrada	Mexico	DNS	

=== 5000 meters ===
May 26

Rank	Name	Nationality	Time	Notes
1st place, gold medalist(s)	Bertha Sánchez	Colombia	16:10.32	
2nd place, silver medalist(s)	Lucélia Peres	Brazil	16:13.67	
3rd place, bronze medalist(s)	Zenaida Maldonado	Puerto Rico	17:09.70	
4	Érika Méndez	Puerto Rico	17:17.12	
5	Liomarys Herrera	Dominican Republic	18:31.53	
6	Dahiana City	Dominican Republic	19:17.79	
	Rosa Chacha	Ecuador	DNS	

=== 100 meters hurdles ===
May 27
Wind: -0.2 m/s

Rank	Name	Nationality	Time	Notes
1st place, gold medalist(s)	Maíla Machado	Brazil	13.02	
2nd place, silver medalist(s)	Gilvaneide de Oliveira	Brazil	13.39	
3rd place, bronze medalist(s)	Francisca Guzmán	Chile	13.45	
4	Brigitte Merlano	Colombia	13.52	
5	Raquel Fraguas	Spain	13.84	
6	Carinés Kianes	Puerto Rico	14.26	
7	Jeimy Bernárdez	Honduras	14.28	NR
8	Kathyenid Rivera	Puerto Rico	14.51	

=== 400 meters hurdles ===
May 27

Rank	Name	Nationality	Time	Notes
1st place, gold medalist(s)	Laia Forcadell	Spain	57.26	
2nd place, silver medalist(s)	Perla dos Santos	Brazil	58.24	
3rd place, bronze medalist(s)	Yvonne Harrison	Puerto Rico	58.56	
4	Dayianna Vázquez	Puerto Rico	1:01.11	
	Princesa Oliveros	Colombia	DNS	

=== 3000 meters steeplechase ===
May 26

Rank	Name	Nationality	Time	Notes
1st place, gold medalist(s)	Zenaide Vieira	Brazil	9:55.95	
2nd place, silver medalist(s)	Teresa Urbina	Spain	10:05.74	
3rd place, bronze medalist(s)	Tamara Sanfabio	Spain	10:13.66	
4	Angélica Sánchez	Mexico	10:43.07	
5	Gabriela Traña	Costa Rica	10:59.80	NR
	Mónica Amboya	Ecuador	DNS	
	Michelle Costa	Brazil	DNS	

=== 4 x 100 meters relay ===
May 28

Rank	Nation	Competitors	Time	Notes
1st place, gold medalist(s)	Brazil	Maíla Machado, Franciela Krasucki, Tathiana Ignácio, Luciana dos Santos	44.49	
2nd place, silver medalist(s)	Puerto Rico	Roxana Mercado, Militza Castro, Jennifer Gutiérrez, Celiangeli Morales	44.50	NR
3rd place, bronze medalist(s)	Colombia	Melisa Murillo, Felipa Palacios, Darlenys Obregón, Norma González	44.79	
4	Dominican Republic	Libia Jackson, Marleny Mejía, Reina Paulino, María Carmona	45.05	NR

=== 4 x 400 meters relay ===
May 28

Rank	Nation	Competitors	Time	Notes
1st place, gold medalist(s)	Mexico	Ruth Grajeda, Gabriela Medina, Mayra González, Nallely Vela	3:33.56	
2nd place, silver medalist(s)	Colombia	Rosibel García, Muriel Coneo, Darlenys Obregón, Norma González	3:37.71	
3rd place, bronze medalist(s)	Puerto Rico	Beatriz Cruz, Maritza Salas, Arelys Caro, Lizaira del Valle	3:38.51	
4	Dominican Republic	Maribel Pie, Yelmi Martínez, Libia Jackson, Lorena de la Rosa	3:40.37	

=== 10,000 meters walk ===
May 27

Rank	Name	Nationality	Time	Notes
1st place, gold medalist(s)	Ana Cabecinha	Portugal	45:45.03	
2nd place, silver medalist(s)	Evelyn Núñez	Guatemala	46:19.48	NR
3rd place, bronze medalist(s)	María José Poves	Spain	46:24.09	
4	Geovana Irusta	Bolivia	47:27.54	
5	Sandra Zapata	Colombia	47:53.89	
6	Marángelis Arroyo	Puerto Rico	51:31.67	NJR
7	Gianetti Bonfim	Brazil	55:19.87	
	Roxanne Rivera	Puerto Rico	DNF	
	Tatiana Orellana	Ecuador	DNS	
	Miriam Ramón	Ecuador	DNS	

=== High jump ===
May 27

Rank	Name	Nationality	1.65	1.70	1.75	1.78	1.81	1.84	1.86	Result	Notes
1st place, gold medalist(s)	Marta Mendía	Spain	–	–	o	o	o	o	xxx	1.84	
2nd place, silver medalist(s)	Juana Arrendel	Dominican Republic	–	–	o	o	o	xo	xxx	1.84	
3rd place, bronze medalist(s)	Marielys Rojas	Venezuela	o	o	o	o	o	xxo	xxx	1.84	
4	Solange Witteveen	Argentina	–	–	o	o	o	xxx		1.81	
5	Eliana Renata da Silva	Brazil	–	o	o	o	xxx			1.75	
6	Fabiola Ayala	Mexico	–	–	xo	o	xxx			1.75	
	Caterine Ibargüen	Colombia								DNS	

=== Pole vault ===
May 26

Rank	Name	Nationality	3.50	3.65	3.80	3.90	4.00	4.10	4.15	4.20	4.31	4.40	4.50	4.56	4.64	Result	Notes
1st place, gold medalist(s)	Fabiana Murer	Brazil	–	–	–	–	–	o	–	o	xxo	xo	o	xxo	xxx	4.56	
2nd place, silver medalist(s)	Joana Ribeiro Costa	Brazil	–	–	–	–	o	o	xxx							4.10	
2nd place, silver medalist(s)	Mar Sánchez	Spain	–	–	o	–	o	o	xxx							4.10	
4	Carolina Torres	Chile	–	–	xo	–	xo	o	xxx							4.10	
5	Consuelo Canino	Puerto Rico	xo	xo	o	xo	xxx									3.90	
6	Alexandra González	Puerto Rico	–	xo	–	xxx										3.65	
7	Cecilia Villar	Mexico	xo	xo	xxx											3.65	
8	Dennise Orengo	Puerto Rico	–	xo	–	xxx										3.65	
	Keisa Monterola	Venezuela	–	–	xxx											NM	

=== Long jump ===
May 27

Rank	Name	Nationality	#1	#2	#3	#4	#5	#6	Result	Notes
1st place, gold medalist(s)	Keila Costa	Brazil	6.54	6.47	6.53	x	6.31	x	6.54	
2nd place, silver medalist(s)	Luciana dos Santos	Brazil	6.17	5.98	6.25	6.01	6.09	4.75	6.25	
3rd place, bronze medalist(s)	Adriana Severino	Dominican Republic	4.87	5.99	6.08	5.92	6.09	x	6.09	
4	Yesenia Rivera	Puerto Rico	6.08	x	6.08	5.97	x	6.02	6.08	
5	Jennifer Arveláez	Venezuela	5.87	x	x	x	6.03	x	6.03	
6	Claudette Martínez	Mexico	x	x	x	5.84	5.77	5.92	5.92	
7	Jéssica Morillo	Venezuela	5.69	5.66	5.70	5.46	5.77	5.78	5.78	
8	María Gabriela Carrillo	El Salvador	x	5.65	5.66	5.77	5.53	x	5.77	
	Caterine Ibargüen	Colombia							DNS	

=== Triple jump ===
May 28

Rank	Name	Nationality	#1	#2	#3	#4	#5	#6	Result	Notes
1st place, gold medalist(s)	Patricia Sarrapio	Spain	13.47	x	13.39	x	13.46	13.82	13.82	
2nd place, silver medalist(s)	Johanna Triviño	Colombia	13.53	13.55	13.33	13.47	12.78	13.28	13.55	
3rd place, bronze medalist(s)	Gisele de Oliveira	Brazil	13.01	13.35	11.73	13.07	13.02	13.15	13.35	
4	Jennifer Arveláez	Venezuela	12.68w	13.19	x	12.94	x	x	13.19	
5	Aidé Yesenia Villarreal	Mexico	x	x	x	12.52	x	11.77	12.52	
6	Adriana Severino	Dominican Republic	x	12.20	11.75	–	–	–	12.20	

=== Shot put ===
May 26

Rank	Name	Nationality	#1	#2	#3	#4	#5	#6	Result	Notes
1st place, gold medalist(s)	Elisângela Adriano	Brazil	16.68	x	x	16.80	16.58	16.99	16.99	
2nd place, silver medalist(s)	Irache Quintanal	Spain	x	16.20	x	15.20	16.15	x	16.20	
3rd place, bronze medalist(s)	Rocío Comba	Argentina	14.26	13.09	15.11	14.62	14.64	x	15.11	
4	Margarita Bernardo	Dominican Republic	14.71	14.97	14.63	13.62	14.08	13.73	14.97	
5	Mary Mercedes	Dominican Republic	14.02	14.66	14.74	14.32	x	14.27	14.74	
6	Norimar Llanos	Puerto Rico	12.15	11.87	11.93	11.35	12.12	11.39	12.15	
	Melisa Mojica	Puerto Rico							DNS	

=== Discus throw ===
May 28

Rank	Name	Nationality	#1	#2	#3	#4	#5	#6	Result	Notes
1st place, gold medalist(s)	Elisângela Adriano	Brazil	56.75	x	58.67	54.81	58.53	58.59	58.67	
2nd place, silver medalist(s)	Irache Quintanal	Spain	x	53.03	53.77	52.42	x	x	53.77	
3rd place, bronze medalist(s)	Marianne Berndt	Chile	48.24	49.59	46.91	48.26	50.05	x	50.05	
4	Rocío Comba	Argentina	40.10	37.79	43.64	35.46	49.99	39.33	49.99	
5	Mary Mercedes	Dominican Republic	x	41.40	45.30	46.51	x	x	46.51	
6	Norimar Llanos	Puerto Rico	38.95	42.34	41.74	42.79	42.54	x	42.79	
	Melisa Mojica	Puerto Rico							DNS	

=== Hammer throw ===
May 27

Rank	Name	Nationality	#1	#2	#3	#4	#5	#6	Result	Notes
1st place, gold medalist(s)	Amarilys Alméstica	Puerto Rico	62.08	65.35	66.21	66.06	64.61	63.83	66.21	
2nd place, silver medalist(s)	Vânia Silva	Portugal	60.37	62.81	64.59	60.66	x	62.70	64.59	
3rd place, bronze medalist(s)	Dolores Pedrares	Spain	x	61.42	64.52	61.81	62.35	x	64.52	
4	Josiane Soares	Brazil	x	59.62	58.23	59.87	61.17	x	61.17	
5	Karina Moya	Argentina	57.50	59.19	60.44	x	59.86	x	60.44	
6	Stefanía Zoryez	Uruguay	54.71	59.53	x	56.95	57.30	x	59.53	
7	Katiuscia Borges	Brazil	x	59.28	53.90	57.72	x	57.33	59.28	
8	Jéssica Ponce de Leon	Mexico	55.25	56.35	x	x	56.12	x	56.35	
9	Anneris Méndez	Dominican Republic	53.09	51.99	x				53.09	
10	Walkiria Rivera	Puerto Rico	44.49	45.42	x				45.42	
	Johana Moreno	Colombia							DNS	
	Johana Ramírez	Colombia							DNS	

=== Javelin throw ===
May 26

Rank	Name	Nationality	#1	#2	#3	#4	#5	#6	Result	Notes
1st place, gold medalist(s)	Alessandra Resende	Brazil	53.52	52.01	54.35	53.95	55.12	x	55.12	
2nd place, silver medalist(s)	Coralys Ortiz	Puerto Rico	37.86	37.77	x	x	x	x	37.86	
	Zuleima Araméndiz	Colombia							DNS	
	Sabina Moya	Colombia							DNS	
	Dalila Rugama	Nicaragua							DNS	

=== Heptathlon ===
May 27–28

The highest mark recorded in each event is highlighted in yellow

Rank	Athlete	Nationality	100m H	HJ	SP	200m	LJ	JT	800m	Points	Notes
1st place, gold medalist(s)	Juana Castillo	Dominican Republic	14.10	1.66	13.09	25.07	5.92	43.64	2:13.46	5860	
2nd place, silver medalist(s)	Elizete da Silva	Brazil	14.70	1.69	11.53	25.18	5.88	39.07	2:23.11	5468	
3rd place, bronze medalist(s)	Francia Manzanillo	Dominican Republic	14.16	1.57	11.62	25.01	5.31	42.28	2:13.56	5448	
4	Coralys Ortiz	Puerto Rico	14.47	1.57	11.98	25.48	5.52	43.98	2:41.25	5126	
5	Diana Ibargüen	Colombia	14.38	1.57	12.00	26.30	5.80	34.77	2:37.24	5019	
6	María Gabriela Carrillo	El Salvador	15.10	1.63	9.42	27.01	5.47	35.48	2:30.86	4756	
7	Nahomi Rivera	Puerto Rico	15.85	1.57	11.24	26.53	5.32	36.12	2:45.19	4552	
	María Peinado	Spain	13.99	1.63	12.45	25.93	5.58	34.52	DNS	DNF	
	Yaritza Rivera	Puerto Rico	14.65	1.63	10.51	26.08	4.92	DNS	–	DNF	
