= 2001 Central American and Caribbean Championships in Athletics – Results =

These are the results of the 2001 Central American and Caribbean Championships in Athletics which took place on July 20–22, 2001 in Guatemala City, Guatemala.

Estadio Mateo Flores, the host venue, is located at an altitude which is believed to affect the performance in some of the events.

== Men's results ==
=== 100 meters ===
Heats – July 20
Wind:
Heat 1: -0.7 m/s, Heat 2: -0.2 m/s, Heat 3: -0.9 m/s, Heat 4: +1.3 m/s

Rank	Heat	Name	Nationality	Time	Notes
1	4	Renward Wells	Bahamas	10.44	Q
2	4	Jacey Harper	Trinidad and Tobago	10.45	Q
3	4	Keita Cline	British Virgin Islands	10.46	Q
4	4	Kim Collins	Saint Kitts and Nevis	10.47	q
5	3	Donovan Powell	Jamaica	10.50	Q
6	3	Marc Burns	Trinidad and Tobago	10.53	Q
7	2	Jesús Carrión	Puerto Rico	10.58	Q
8	2	Everton Evelyn	Barbados	10.60	Q
9	3	Juan Pita	Cuba	10.62	Q
10	1	Juan Morillo	Venezuela	10.64	Q
10	2	Churandy Martina	Netherlands Antilles	10.64	q
12	2	Jorge Richardson	Puerto Rico	10.67	q
13	2	Rolando Blanco	Guatemala	10.70	q
14	3	Francisco Cornelio	Dominican Republic	10.72	
15	4	De-Von Bean	Bermuda	10.76	
16	1	Julien Dunkley	Jamaica	10.85	Q
17	4	Luis Cardoz	Mexico	10.86	
18	1	César López	Mexico	10.96	Q
19	2	Bob Colville	Costa Rica	10.98	
20	1	Nilson Palacios	Venezuela	11.04	
21	1	Jorge Luis Solórzano	Guatemala	11.10	
22	1	Brian Babbs	Bahamas	11.10	
23	3	Joseph Colville	Costa Rica	11.28	
24	1	Denis Gutiérrez	Nicaragua	11.41	
25	2	Jorge Conde	Nicaragua	11.46	
26	3	Fidel Chávez	Honduras	12.04	

Semifinals – July 20
Wind:
Heat 1: -0.2 m/s, Heat 2: +0.7 m/s

Rank	Heat	Name	Nationality	Time	Notes
1	1	Kim Collins	Saint Kitts and Nevis	10.31	Q
2	1	Renward Wells	Bahamas	10.33	Q
2	2	Marc Burns	Trinidad and Tobago	10.33	Q
4	1	Jacey Harper	Trinidad and Tobago	10.37	Q
5	1	Julien Dunkley	Jamaica	10.38	Q
6	2	Donovan Powell	Jamaica	10.40	Q
7	1	Keita Cline	British Virgin Islands	10.45	
8	2	Juan Pita	Cuba	10.47	Q
9	1	Juan Morillo	Venezuela	10.52	
9	2	Jorge Richardson	Puerto Rico	10.52	Q
11	2	Dion Crabbe	British Virgin Islands	10.54	
12	2	Everton Evelyn	Barbados	10.56	
13	2	Jesús Carrión	Puerto Rico	10.58	
14	1	César López	Mexico	10.77	
15	1	Rolando Blanco	Guatemala	10.78	
16	2	Churandy Martina	Netherlands Antilles	10.83	

Final – July 20
Wind: -0.2 m/s

Rank	Name	Nationality	Time	Notes
1st place, gold medalist(s)	Kim Collins	Saint Kitts and Nevis	10.04	CR
2nd place, silver medalist(s)	Julien Dunkley	Jamaica	10.35	
3rd place, bronze medalist(s)	Jacey Harper	Trinidad and Tobago	10.39	
4	Renward Wells	Bahamas	10.39	
5	Marc Burns	Trinidad and Tobago	10.44	
6	Juan Pita	Cuba	10.49	
7	Donovan Powell	Jamaica	10.51	
8	Jorge Richardson	Puerto Rico	16.05	

=== 200 meters ===
Heats – July 20
Wind:
Heat 1: 0.0 m/s, Heat 2: +1.3 m/s, Heat 3: -0.3 m/s, Heat 4: 0.0 m/s

Rank	Heat	Name	Nationality	Time	Notes
1	1	Juan Pedro Toledo	Mexico	20.87	Q
2	1	Keita Cline	British Virgin Islands	21.02	Q
3	1	Charlton Rafaela	Netherlands Antilles	21.37	Q
4	1	Juan Sainfleur	Dominican Republic	22.00	q
1	2	Dennis Darling	Bahamas	21.24	Q
2	2	Ellis Ollarves	Venezuela	21.27	Q
3	2	Alianni Hechevarría	Cuba	21.72	Q
4	2	Rolando Blanco	Guatemala	21.91	q
1	3	Renward Wells	Bahamas	21.00	Q
2	3	José Carabalí	Venezuela	21.28	Q
3	3	Dion Crabbe	British Virgin Islands	21.45	Q
4	3	Ruben Chávez	Mexico	22.24	q
1	4	Lanceford Davis	Jamaica	21.14	Q
2	4	Kim Collins	Saint Kitts and Nevis	21.45	Q
3	4	Jorge Luis Solórzano	Guatemala	22.24	Q
4	4	Jorge Conde	Nicaragua	22.76	
5	4	Fidel Chávez	Honduras	24.30	
6	4	Francisco Cornelio	Dominican Republic	24.95	

Semifinals – July 21
Wind:
Heat 1: +0.6 m/s, Heat 2: +1.9 m/s

Rank	Heat	Name	Nationality	Time	Notes
1	1	Kim Collins	Saint Kitts and Nevis	20.77	Q
2	2	Renward Wells	Bahamas	20.79	Q
3	1	Juan Pedro Toledo	Mexico	20.92	Q
4	2	Alianni Hechevarría	Cuba	20.96	Q
5	1	Keita Cline	British Virgin Islands	20.98	Q
6	1	José Carabalí	Venezuela	21.17	Q
7	2	Charlton Rafaela	Netherlands Antilles	21.20	Q
8	2	Ellis Ollarves	Venezuela	21.21	Q
9	2	Lanceford Davis	Jamaica	21.23	
10	1	Dennis Darling	Bahamas	21.26	
11	2	Dion Crabbe	British Virgin Islands	21.29	
12	1	Rolando Blanco	Guatemala	21.69	
13	2	Jorge Luis Solórzano	Guatemala	21.82	
14	2	Ruben Chávez	Mexico	22.01	
	1	Juan Sainfleur	Dominican Republic	DNS	

Final – July 21
Wind: -1.5 m/s

Rank	Name	Nationality	Time	Notes
1st place, gold medalist(s)	Kim Collins	Saint Kitts and Nevis	20.55	
2nd place, silver medalist(s)	Juan Pedro Toledo	Mexico	20.82	
3rd place, bronze medalist(s)	Keita Cline	British Virgin Islands	20.88	
4	Alianni Hechevarría	Cuba	20.89	
5	Renward Wells	Bahamas	21.01	
6	Charlton Rafaela	Netherlands Antilles	21.21	
7	José Carabalí	Venezuela	21.28	
8	Ellis Ollarves	Venezuela	22.00	

=== 400 meters ===
Heats – July 20

Rank	Heat	Name	Nationality	Time	Notes
1	1	William Hernández	Venezuela	46.78	Q
2	3	Alleyne Francique	Grenada	47.00	Q
3	1	Danny McFarlane	Jamaica	47.02	Q
4	1	Alejandro Cárdenas	Mexico	47.13	Q
5	3	Damion Barry	Trinidad and Tobago	47.30	Q
6	2	Brandon Simpson	Jamaica	47.37	Q
7	1	Álvaro James	Costa Rica	47.38	Q
8	3	Jonathan Palma	Venezuela	47.66	Q
9	2	Simon Pierre	Trinidad and Tobago	47.87	Q
10	2	Carlos Santa	Dominican Republic	48.21	Q
11	3	Jason Hunte	Barbados	48.23	Q
12	1	Paul Saunders	Bahamas	48.36	q
13	3	Steven Demeritte	Bahamas	48.43	q
14	2	Alianni Hechevarría	Cuba	48.47	Q
15	2	Wilan Louis	Barbados	49.01	q
16	3	Alejando Navarro	El Salvador	49.25	q
17	1	Óscar Silva	Nicaragua	51.87	
18	3	Martín Acevedo	Nicaragua	52.49	
19	3	Carlos Morales	Guatemala	52.87	

Semifinals – July 20

Rank	Heat	Name	Nationality	Time	Notes
1	2	Brandon Simpson	Jamaica	45.68	Q
2	2	Alejandro Cárdenas	Mexico	46.38	Q
3	1	Danny McFarlane	Jamaica	46.48	Q
4	2	Alleyne Francique	Grenada	46.53	Q
5	2	Álvaro James	Costa Rica	46.70	Q
6	1	William Hernández	Venezuela	46.72	Q
7	1	Damion Barry	Trinidad and Tobago	46.84	Q
8	1	Jason Hunte	Barbados	47.43	Q
8	2	Jonathan Palma	Venezuela	47.43	
10	1	Alianni Hechevarría	Cuba	47.47	
11	2	Simon Pierre	Trinidad and Tobago	47.70	
12	1	Paul Saunders	Bahamas	48.19	
13	2	Wilan Louis	Barbados	48.23	
14	2	Steven Demeritte	Bahamas	48.58	
15	1	Alejando Navarro	El Salvador	49.07	
	1	Carlos Santa	Dominican Republic	DNF	

Final – July 21

Rank	Name	Nationality	Time	Notes
1st place, gold medalist(s)	Danny McFarlane	Jamaica	45.20	
2nd place, silver medalist(s)	Brandon Simpson	Jamaica	45.46	
3rd place, bronze medalist(s)	Alejandro Cárdenas	Mexico	45.85	
4	Alleyne Francique	Grenada	45.95	
5	Damion Barry	Trinidad and Tobago	46.89	
6	Álvaro James	Costa Rica	47.35	
7	William Hernández	Venezuela	47.46	
8	Jason Hunte	Barbados	47.91	

=== 800 meters ===
Heats – July 21

Rank	Heat	Name	Nationality	Time	Notes
1	1	Norberto Téllez	Cuba	1:50.29	Q
2	3	Marvin Watts	Jamaica	1:50.59	Q
3	1	Alfredo Escobar	Venezuela	1:50.60	Q
4	1	Alexis Roberts	Bahamas	1:50.74	q
5	3	Ricardo Etheridge	Puerto Rico	1:50.80	Q
6	3	Juan Luis Barrios	Mexico	1:50.99	q
7	2	Simoncito Silvera	Venezuela	1:51.33	Q
8	2	Heleodoro Navarro	Mexico	1:51.98	Q
9	2	José Zayas	Dominican Republic	1:52.12	
10	1	Keneth Otarola	Costa Rica	1:53.25	
11	3	César Martínez	Nicaragua	1:54.40	
12	3	Jefry Pérez	Costa Rica	1:54.54	
13	2	Francisco Sáenz	Guatemala	1:55.21	
14	1	Richard Rodríguez	Aruba	2:00.32	
15	1	Byron de Leon	Guatemala	2:03.57	

Final – July 22

Rank	Name	Nationality	Time	Notes
1st place, gold medalist(s)	Norberto Téllez	Cuba	1:46.51	
2nd place, silver medalist(s)	Marvin Watts	Jamaica	1:47.14	
3rd place, bronze medalist(s)	Simoncito Silvera	Venezuela	1:48.12	
4	Ricardo Etheridge	Puerto Rico	1:48.35	
5	Juan Luis Barrios	Mexico	1:49.54	
6	Heleodoro Navarro	Mexico	1:49.70	
7	Alfredo Escobar	Venezuela	1:52.89	
8	Alexis Roberts	Bahamas	2:00.81	

=== 1500 meters ===
July 20

Rank	Name	Nationality	Time	Notes
1st place, gold medalist(s)	Salvador Miranda	Mexico	3:46.78	
2nd place, silver medalist(s)	Freddy González	Venezuela	3:47.04	
3rd place, bronze medalist(s)	Juan Luis Barrios	Mexico	3:47.62	
4	José Zayas	Dominican Republic	3:48.36	
5	Keneth Otarola	Costa Rica	3:52.80	
6	Jefry Pérez	Costa Rica	3:52.97	
7	Puluc Allen	Guatemala	3:55.52	
8	Ricardo Etheridge	Puerto Rico	4:06.72	
9	Jason Sayers	Saint Lucia	4:11.11	
10	Selvin Molineros	Guatemala	4:15.63	
11	Richard Rodríguez	Aruba	4:17.53	
	Emigdio Delgado	Venezuela	DNF	

=== 5000 meters ===
July 21

Rank	Name	Nationality	Time	Notes
1st place, gold medalist(s)	Teodoro Vega	Mexico	14:00.46	
2nd place, silver medalist(s)	Alejandro Suárez	Mexico	14:11.76	
3rd place, bronze medalist(s)	Freddy González	Venezuela	14:25.84	
4	Francisco Gómez Vega	Costa Rica	14:29.70	
5	Erick Quirós	Costa Rica	14:41.92	
6	José Amado García	Guatemala	14:57.04	
7	Pamenos Ballantyne	Saint Vincent and the Grenadines	14:57.58	
8	Antonio Hernández	Guatemala	15:14.63	
9	Michael Tomlin	Jamaica	15:47.08	
10	Albert Donawa	Bermuda	16:22.40	
11	Ronald Arias	El Salvador	16:32.35	
12	Jason Sayers	Saint Lucia	16:43.04	
13	Carlos Ávila	Honduras	17:17.26	

=== 10,000 meters ===
July 20

Rank	Name	Nationality	Time	Notes
1st place, gold medalist(s)	Isaac Gómez	Mexico	30:40.96	
2nd place, silver medalist(s)	Jonatan Morales	Mexico	30:41.99	
3rd place, bronze medalist(s)	José Amado García	Guatemala	30:53.52	
4	Pamenos Ballantyne	Saint Vincent and the Grenadines	31:20.86	
5	Antonio Hernández	Guatemala	31:33.23	
6	Carlos Ávila	Honduras	36:08.47	

=== Half marathon ===
July 22

Rank	Name	Nationality	Time	Notes
1st place, gold medalist(s)	Procopio Franco	Mexico	1:06:33	
2nd place, silver medalist(s)	Francisco Bautista	Mexico	1:06:33	
3rd place, bronze medalist(s)	José de Jesús	Mexico	1:06:39	
4	Alfredo Arévalo	Guatemala	1:06:50	
5	Pamenos Ballantyne	Saint Vincent and the Grenadines	1:07:06	
6	Irán Ramón Trutie	Cuba	1:07:58	
7	Juan Eulogio Ramos	Guatemala	1:08:56	
8	Richardo Iquite	Guatemala	1:09:15	
9	Santiago Reyes	Guatemala	1:09:38	
10	Catalino Yucute	Guatemala	1:11:02	
11	Rafael Yax	Guatemala	1:11:56	
12	Jorge Hernández	El Salvador	1:15:59	
13	Emiliano Lemus	Honduras	1:16:51	
14	Pedro Ventura	Honduras	1:18:12	

=== 110 meters hurdles ===
Heats – July 20
Wind:
Heat 1: 0.0 m/s, Heat 2: 0.0 m/s

Rank	Heat	Name	Nationality	Time	Notes
1	2	Stephen Jones	Barbados	13.82	Q
2	2	Emilio Valle	Cuba	13.90	Q
3	1	Maurice Wignall	Jamaica	13.91	Q
4	1	Gabriel Burnett	Barbados	14.14	Q
5	2	Ricardo Melbourne	Jamaica	14.23	Q
6	1	Sadros Sánchez	Panama	14.39	Q
7	2	Roberto Castrejón	Mexico	14.49	q
8	1	Luis López	Mexico	14.78	q
9	1	Pavel Ramírez	Guatemala	17.83	

Final – July 21
Wind:
-0.5 m/s

Rank	Name	Nationality	Time	Notes
1st place, gold medalist(s)	Maurice Wignall	Jamaica	13.76	
2nd place, silver medalist(s)	Gabriel Burnett	Barbados	13.82	
3rd place, bronze medalist(s)	Stephen Jones	Barbados	13.83	
4	Emilio Valle	Cuba	13.85	
5	Ricardo Melbourne	Jamaica	14.27	
6	Sadros Sánchez	Panama	14.42	
7	Luis López	Mexico	14.54	
8	Roberto Castrejón	Mexico	14.68	

=== 400 meters hurdles ===
Heats – July 21

Rank	Heat	Name	Nationality	Time	Notes
1	1	Mario Watts	Jamaica	50.64	Q
2	1	Jorge Josué Moreno	Cuba	51.06	Q
2	2	Oscar Juanz	Mexico	51.06	Q
4	2	Ryan King	Barbados	51.27	Q
5	1	Roberto Cortez	El Salvador	52.13	Q
6	1	Roberto Carbajal	Mexico	52.14	q
7	1	José Gregorio Turbay	Venezuela	52.25	q
8	2	Ednal Rolle	Bahamas	52.53	Q
9	1	Ryan Smith	Barbados	54.79	
10	1	Oscar Ramírez	Guatemala	57.41	
11	2	Emilio Morales	Nicaragua	59.85	

Final – July 22

Rank	Name	Nationality	Time	Notes
1st place, gold medalist(s)	Mario Watts	Jamaica	49.31	
2nd place, silver medalist(s)	Jorge Josué Moreno	Cuba	50.05	
3rd place, bronze medalist(s)	Oscar Juanz	Mexico	50.11	
4	Ednal Rolle	Bahamas	51.08	
5	Ryan King	Barbados	51.12	
6	José Gregorio Turbay	Venezuela	51.36	
7	Roberto Cortez	El Salvador	52.55	
8	Roberto Carbajal	Mexico	52.61	

=== 3000 meters steeplechase ===
July 22

Rank	Name	Nationality	Time	Notes
1st place, gold medalist(s)	Salvador Miranda	Mexico	8:50.36	
2nd place, silver medalist(s)	Néstor Nieves	Venezuela	9:01.48	
3rd place, bronze medalist(s)	Alexander Greaux	Puerto Rico	9:03.52	
4	Francisco Gómez Vega	Costa Rica	9:06.82	
5	Emigdio Delgado	Venezuela	9:23.61	
6	Erick Bonilla	El Salvador	9:31.01	
7	Johnny Loría	Costa Rica	9:33.32	
8	Selvin Molineros	Guatemala	10:07.19	
9	Luis Treminio	Nicaragua	10:16.73	

=== 4 x 100 meters relay ===
Heats – July 21

Rank	Heat	Nation	Athletes	Time	Notes
1	2	Puerto Rico	Carlos Santos, Jorge Richardson, Osvaldo Nieves, Jesús Carrión	39.74	Q
2	2	Jamaica	Donovan Powell, Julien Dunkley, Lanceford Davis, Maurice Wignall	39.83	Q
3	1	Venezuela	Juan Morillo, José Peña, José Carabalí, Ellis Ollarves	40.08	Q
4	2	Bahamas	Jamial Rolle, Andrew Tynes, Iram Lewis, Brian Babbs	40.18	Q
5	1	Trinidad and Tobago	Jacey Harper, Marc Burns, Simon Pierre, Damion Barry	40.39	Q
6	1	Dominican Republic	Juan Sainfleur, Luis Morillo, Francisco Cornelio, Ricardo Menor	40.58	Q
7	1	Cayman Islands	Robert Ibeh, Roger Smith, David Hamal, Kareem Streete-Thompson	40.74	q
8	2	Mexico	Luis Cardoz, Rubén Chávez, César López, Roberto Castrejón	40.95	q
9	2	Cuba	Juan Pita, Emilio Valle, Alianni Hechevarría, Yoandris Betanzos	41.15	
10	1	Guatemala	Mario Blanco, Isaí Cruz, José Meneses, Jorge Luis Solórzano	41.32	
11	2	Nicaragua	Óscar Silva, Yader Sánchez, Martín Acevedo, Jorge Conde	43.24	

Final – July 22

Rank	Nation	Athletes	Time	Notes
1st place, gold medalist(s)	Bahamas	Jamial Rolle, Andrew Tynes, Iram Lewis, Brian Babbs	39.27	
2nd place, silver medalist(s)	Venezuela	Juan Morillo, José Peña, José Carabalí, Ellis Ollarves	39.31	
3rd place, bronze medalist(s)	Puerto Rico	Carlos Santos, Jorge Richardson, Osvaldo Nieves, Jesús Carrión	39.63	
4	Trinidad and Tobago	Jacey Harper, Marc Burns, Simon Pierre, Damion Barry	39.70	
5	Dominican Republic	Juan Sainfleur, Luis Morillo, Francisco Cornelio, Ricardo Menor	40.24	
6	Mexico	Luis Cardoz, César López, Rubén Chávez, Juan Pedro Toledo	40.26	
7	Cayman Islands	Ronald Forbes, Kareem Streete-Thompson, Robert Ibeh, Roger Smith	40.99	
	Jamaica	Donovan Powell, Julien Dunkley, Lanceford Davis, Omar Brown	DNF	

=== 4 x 400 meters relay ===
July 22

Rank	Nation	Athletes	Time	Notes
1st place, gold medalist(s)	Jamaica	Orville Taylor, Brandon Simpson, Mario Watts, Danny McFarlane	3:00.83	CR
2nd place, silver medalist(s)	Mexico	Alejandro Cárdenas, Roberto Carbajal, Juan Pedro Toledo, Oscar Juanz	3:03.29	
3rd place, bronze medalist(s)	Venezuela	Jonathan Palma, Nilson Palacios, Luis Luna, William Hernández	3:06.93	
4	Barbados	Jason Hunte, Rodney Forde, Ryan Smith, Wilan Louis	3:08.31	
5	Bahamas	Richard Petty, Iram Lewis, Steven Demeritte, Paul Saunders	3:09.28	
6	Dominican Republic	Francisco Cornelio, Luis Morillo, Ricardo Menor, Carlos Santa	3:09.46	

=== 20 kilometers walk ===
July 22

Rank	Name	Nationality	Time	Notes
1st place, gold medalist(s)	Luis Fernando García	Guatemala	1:25:44	
2nd place, silver medalist(s)	Mario Iván Flores	Mexico	1:25:45	
3rd place, bronze medalist(s)	Julio René Martínez	Guatemala	1:29:47	
4	Hugo López	Guatemala	1:30:11	
5	Julio César Urías	Guatemala	1:32:38	
6	Ricardo Reyes	El Salvador	1:37:58	
7	Elias Maldonado	El Salvador	1:41:12	
8	Carlos Ortíz	Guatemala	1:43:22	
9	Leonidas Romero	Honduras	1:48:10	
10	Wilmor López	Nicaragua	1:52:13	
	Omar Zepeda	Mexico	DNF	
	Claudio Erasmo Vargas	Mexico	DQ	

=== High jump ===
July 22

Rank	Name	Nationality	Result	Notes
1st place, gold medalist(s)	Henderson Dottin	Barbados	2.20	
2nd place, silver medalist(s)	Raúl Touset	Cuba	2.20	
3rd place, bronze medalist(s)	Damon Thompson	Barbados	2.15	
4	James Rolle	Bahamas	2.15	
4	Omar Camacho	Puerto Rico	2.15	
6	Edgar Lightbourn	Bahamas	2.05	
7	Tulio Ernesto Quiroz	Honduras	1.90	

=== Pole vault ===
July 20

Rank	Name	Nationality	Result	Notes
1st place, gold medalist(s)	Dominic Johnson	Saint Lucia	5.20	
2nd place, silver medalist(s)	Ricardo Diez	Venezuela	5.05	
2nd place, silver medalist(s)	Jorge Tienda	Mexico	5.05	
4	Edgar León	Mexico	5.05	
5	Jabari Ennis	Jamaica	4.45	
6	Kenny Moxey	Bahamas	4.30	
6	Jorge Nery Solorzáno	Guatemala	4.30	
	Herman Domínguez	Guatemala	NM	

=== Long jump ===
July 21

Rank	Group	Name	Nationality	Result	Notes
1st place, gold medalist(s)	1	Kareem Streete-Thompson	Cayman Islands	7.97	
2nd place, silver medalist(s)	1	Leevan Sands	Bahamas	7.85	
3rd place, bronze medalist(s)	2	Chris Wright	Bahamas	7.75	
4	2	José Joaquin Reyes	Venezuela	7.66	
5	2	Bob Colville	Costa Rica	7.57	
6	2	De-Von Bean	Bermuda	7.55	
7	2	Antholow Dawkins	Jamaica	7.53	
8	2	Manolo Merida	Guatemala	7.43	
9	1	Esteban Copland	Venezuela	7.35	
10	1	Sergio Sauceda	Mexico	7.21	
11	1	Enrique Colville	Costa Rica	6.70	
12	1	Álvaro Paiz	Guatemala	5.37	

=== Triple jump ===
July 21

Rank	Name	Nationality	Result	Notes
1st place, gold medalist(s)	Brian Wellman	Bermuda	17.24	CR
2nd place, silver medalist(s)	Yoandri Betanzos	Cuba	16.64	
3rd place, bronze medalist(s)	Gregory Hughes	Barbados	15.99	
4	Noel Comrie	Jamaica	15.96	
5	Dame Maglorie	Saint Lucia	15.79	
6	Gerardo Carrasco	Mexico	15.20	
7	Álvaro Paiz	Guatemala	14.36	
8	Ulises Peña	Nicaragua	14.15	
9	Juan Carlos Nájera	Guatemala	13.60	

=== Shot put ===
July 21

Rank	Name	Nationality	Result	Notes
1st place, gold medalist(s)	Yojer Medina	Venezuela	18.86	
2nd place, silver medalist(s)	Alexis Paumier	Cuba	18.66	
3rd place, bronze medalist(s)	Dave Stoute	Trinidad and Tobago	17.79	
4	Ronny Jiménez	Venezuela	17.77	
5	Patrick Harding	Guyana	16.11	
6	Edson Monzón	Guatemala	15.14	
7	Paulino Ríos	Mexico	15.06	
8	Henry Santos	Guatemala	14.34	

=== Discus throw ===
July 20

Rank	Name	Nationality	Result	Notes
1st place, gold medalist(s)	Michel Hemmings	Cuba	57.69	
2nd place, silver medalist(s)	Alfredo Romero	Puerto Rico	52.04	
3rd place, bronze medalist(s)	Mauricio Serna	Mexico	50.50	
4	Dave Taylor	Barbados	47.44	
5	Patrick Harding	Guyana	43.76	
6	Nelson Chavarría	Costa Rica	43.25	
7	Raúl Rivera	Guatemala	43.00	
8	Edson Monzón	Guatemala	38.88	
9	Cliff Williams	British Virgin Islands	38.70	
10	Luis Carlos Puerto	Honduras	36.66	

=== Hammer throw ===
July 21

Rank	Name	Nationality	Result	Notes
1st place, gold medalist(s)	Yosmel Montes	Cuba	69.24	
2nd place, silver medalist(s)	Santos Vega	Puerto Rico	63.11	
3rd place, bronze medalist(s)	Aldo Bello	Venezuela	61.80	
4	Raúl Rivera	Guatemala	61.23	
5	Carlos Valencia	Mexico	60.75	
6	Nelson Chavarría	Costa Rica	45.74	
7	Luis Carlos Puerto	Honduras	42.39	
8	Jorge Echeverría	Guatemala	40.90	

=== Javelin throw ===
July 20

Rank	Name	Nationality	Result	Notes
1st place, gold medalist(s)	Manuel Fuenmayor	Venezuela	68.73	
2nd place, silver medalist(s)	Rigoberto Calderón	Nicaragua	67.00	
3rd place, bronze medalist(s)	Javier Ugarte	Nicaragua	62.81	
4	Klaus Schmock	Guatemala	56.80	

=== Decathlon ===
July 20–21

Rank	Name	Nationality	Result	Notes
1st place, gold medalist(s)	Maurice Smith	Jamaica	7755	CR
2nd place, silver medalist(s)	Luiggi Llanos	Puerto Rico	7272	
3rd place, bronze medalist(s)	Yonelvis Águila	Cuba	7196	
4	Francisco Herrera	Mexico	6728	
5	Iván Gavaldon	Mexico	6407	

== Women's results ==
=== 100 meters ===
Heats – July 20
Wind:
Heat 1: +0.9 m/s, Heat 2: -1.0 m/s, Heat 3: -1.2 m/s

Rank	Heat	Name	Nationality	Time	Notes
1	1	Astia Walker	Jamaica	11.36	Q
2	1	Liliana Allen	Mexico	11.49	Q
3	1	Ruth Grajeda	Mexico	11.69	q
1	2	Veronica Campbell	Jamaica	11.74	Q
2	2	Tahesia Harrigan	British Virgin Islands	11.93	Q
3	2	María José Paiz	Guatemala	12.43	
1	3	Virgen Benavides	Cuba	11.51	Q
2	3	Fana Ashby	Trinidad and Tobago	11.70	Q
3	3	Valma Bass	Saint Kitts and Nevis	11.74	q
4	3	Gabriela Patterson	Costa Rica	12.17	
5	3	Juanita Ferguson	Bahamas	12.28	

Final – July 20
Wind:
-1.1 m/s

Rank	Name	Nationality	Time	Notes
1st place, gold medalist(s)	Liliana Allen	Mexico	11.32	
2nd place, silver medalist(s)	Astia Walker	Jamaica	11.41	
3rd place, bronze medalist(s)	Virgen Benavides	Cuba	11.48	
4	Valma Bass	Saint Kitts and Nevis	11.62	
5	Fana Ashby	Trinidad and Tobago	11.76	
6	Ruth Grajeda	Mexico	11.83	
7	Tahesia Harrigan	British Virgin Islands	12.05	
8	Veronica Campbell	Jamaica	12.13	

=== 200 meters ===
Heats – July 21
Wind:
Heat 1: +0.4 m/s, Heat 2: +0.7 m/s

Rank	Heat	Name	Nationality	Time	Notes
1	1	Cydonie Mothersille	Cayman Islands	22.68	Q
2	1	Valma Bass	Saint Kitts and Nevis	22.99	Q
3	1	Liliana Allen	Mexico	24.60	Q
4	1	Gabriela Patterson	Costa Rica	24.92	q
5	1	Maritza Figueroa	Nicaragua	26.04	q
	1	Fana Ashby	Trinidad and Tobago	DNF	
1	2	Virgen Benavides	Cuba	24.05	Q
2	2	Tahesia Harrigan	British Virgin Islands	24.67	Q
3	2	Ruth Grajeda	Mexico	24.85	Q

Final – July 21
Wind:
-0.4 m/s

Rank	Name	Nationality	Time	Notes
1st place, gold medalist(s)	Cydonie Mothersille	Cayman Islands	22.54	
2nd place, silver medalist(s)	Liliana Allen	Mexico	23.13	
3rd place, bronze medalist(s)	Virgen Benavides	Cuba	23.36	
4	Ruth Grajeda	Mexico	23.68	
5	Valma Bass	Saint Kitts and Nevis	23.69	
6	Tahesia Harrigan	British Virgin Islands	24.65	
7	Gabriela Patterson	Costa Rica	25.01	
8	Maritza Figueroa	Nicaragua	26.08	

=== 400 meters ===
July 21

Rank	Name	Nationality	Time	Notes
1st place, gold medalist(s)	Michelle Burgher	Jamaica	53.04	
2nd place, silver medalist(s)	Allison Beckford	Jamaica	53.28	
3rd place, bronze medalist(s)	Beatriz Cruz	Puerto Rico	53.90	
4	Militza Castro	Puerto Rico	54.08	
5	Rossana Rodríguez	Guatemala	59.10	
6	Luz Patricia Valenzuela	Guatemala	1:02.13	
	Claudia Vargas	Dominican Republic	DNF	

=== 800 meters ===
Heats – July 21

Rank	Heat	Name	Nationality	Time	Notes
1	2	Michelle Ballentine	Jamaica	2:04.76	Q
2	2	Welma Colebrook	Bahamas	2:09.76	Q
3	2	Sandra Moya	Puerto Rico	2:13.42	Q
4	1	Yanelis Lara	Cuba	2:15.37	Q
5	1	Marian Burnett	Guyana	2:15.59	Q
6	1	Claudia Vargas	Dominican Republic	2:16.57	Q
7	1	Gabriela Traña	Costa Rica	2:17.22	q
8	2	Gabriela Quezada	El Salvador	2:17.58	q
9	1	Sherma Aurelien	United States Virgin Islands	2:24.06	
10	2	Rossana Rodríguez	Guatemala	2:26.82	

Final – July 22

Rank	Name	Nationality	Time	Notes
1st place, gold medalist(s)	Yanelis Lara	Cuba	2:01.86	
2nd place, silver medalist(s)	Michelle Ballentine	Jamaica	2:02.11	
3rd place, bronze medalist(s)	Sandra Moya	Puerto Rico	2:05.45	
4	Marian Burnett	Guyana	2:08.29	
5	Welma Colebrook	Bahamas	2:13.17	
6	Gabriela Quezada	El Salvador	2:15.60	
7	Gabriela Traña	Costa Rica	2:17.36	
8	Claudia Vargas	Dominican Republic	2:18.57	

=== 1500 meters ===
July 20

Rank	Name	Nationality	Time	Notes
1st place, gold medalist(s)	Yanelis Lara	Cuba	4:32.37	
2nd place, silver medalist(s)	Margarita Tapia	Mexico	4:36.55	
3rd place, bronze medalist(s)	Gabriela Traña	Costa Rica	4:40.73	
4	Dina Cruz	Guatemala	4:46.31	
5	Yoly Mendoza	Venezuela	4:50.42	
6	Santisha Martin	Bahamas	5:01.33	
7	Lubia Ramírez	Guatemala	5:08.55	
8	Kimberly Hopkins	Bahamas	5:21.33	

=== 5000 meters ===
July 21

Rank	Name	Nationality	Time	Notes
1st place, gold medalist(s)	América Mateos	Mexico	16:27.59	CR
2nd place, silver medalist(s)	Margarita Tapia	Mexico	16:28.76	
3rd place, bronze medalist(s)	Elsa Monterroso	Guatemala	17:17.00	
4	Zenaida Maldonado	Puerto Rico	17:34.41	
5	Norelys Lugo	Venezuela	17:34.54	
6	Gabriela Traña	Costa Rica	18:16.19	
7	Dina Judith Cruz	Guatemala	18:40.56	
8	Giselle Coira	Puerto Rico	19:20.54	

=== 10,000 meters ===
July 20

Rank	Name	Nationality	Time	Notes
1st place, gold medalist(s)	América Mateos	Mexico	34:42.91	
2nd place, silver medalist(s)	Norelys Lugo	Venezuela	36:29.09	
3rd place, bronze medalist(s)	Elsa Monterroso	Guatemala	36:57.30	
4	Klody Hidalgo	El Salvador	37:40.89	

=== Half marathon ===
July 21

Rank	Name	Nationality	Time	Notes
1st place, gold medalist(s)	Mariela González	Cuba	1:18:33	
2nd place, silver medalist(s)	Liliana Merlo	Mexico	1:18:47	
3rd place, bronze medalist(s)	Guadalupe García	Mexico	1:22:18	
4	Herlinda Xol	Guatemala	1:22:57	
5	Kriscia García	El Salvador	1:24:03	
5	Magda Milady Castillo	Honduras	1:24:03	
7	Maribel Burgos	Puerto Rico	1:24:11	
8	Lourdes Cruz	Puerto Rico	1:24:50	
9	Berta González	Guatemala	1:26:35	
10	Margarita Conde	Guatemala	1:26:59	
11	Luz Cruz	Puerto Rico	1:29:02	
12	Angelina Turcios	Guatemala	1:32:19	
13	Brenda Zavala	Guatemala	1:32:48	

=== 100 meters hurdles ===
July 21
Wind: -0.8 m/s

Rank	Name	Nationality	Time	Notes
1st place, gold medalist(s)	Dainelky Pérez	Cuba	13.31	
2nd place, silver medalist(s)	Astia Walker	Jamaica	13.32	
3rd place, bronze medalist(s)	Keitha Moseley	Barbados	13.74	
4	Lucilia Contreras	Mexico	14.07	
5	Sharolyn Scott	Costa Rica	15.51	
6	Sandra Oliveros	Guatemala	15.71	
7	Carolina Castellanos	Guatemala	16.34	

=== 400 meters hurdles ===
Heats – July 21

Rank	Heat	Name	Nationality	Time	Notes
1	1	Yvonne Harrison	Puerto Rico	56.46	Q
2	1	Peta-Gaye Gayle	Jamaica	56.58	Q
3	2	Melaine Walker	Jamaica	57.23	Q
4	1	Yudalis Díaz	Cuba	59.00	Q
5	2	Yamelis Ortiz	Puerto Rico	59.51	Q
6	2	Mayra González	Mexico	59.66	q
7	2	Verónica Quijano	El Salvador	1:00.24	Q
8	1	Sandra Oliveros	Guatemala	1:05.12	q
9	2	Luz Patricia Valenzuela	Guatemala	1:05.66	
10	2	Sharolyn Scott	Costa Rica	1:08.39	

Final – July 22

Rank	Name	Nationality	Time	Notes
1st place, gold medalist(s)	Yvonne Harrison	Puerto Rico	55.86	
2nd place, silver medalist(s)	Peta-Gaye Gayle	Jamaica	55.92	
3rd place, bronze medalist(s)	Yamelis Ortiz	Puerto Rico	57.26	
4	Melaine Walker	Jamaica	57.55	
5	Mayra González	Mexico	58.84	
6	Verónica Quijano	El Salvador	59.20	
7	Sandra Oliveros	Guatemala	1:04.26	
	Yudalis Díaz	Cuba	DNS	

=== 4 x 100 meters relay ===
July 22

Rank	Nation	Athletes	Time	Notes
1st place, gold medalist(s)	Jamaica	Astia Walker, Nadine Palmer, Peta-Gaye Barrett, Elva Goulbourne	43.83	CR
2nd place, silver medalist(s)	Cuba	Katiuska Pérez, Yudalis Díaz, Dainelky Pérez, Vírgen Benavides	45.09	
3rd place, bronze medalist(s)	Guatemala	Rossana Rodríguez, Carolina Castellanos, Denisse Jerez, María José Paiz	50.08	

=== 4 x 400 meters relay ===
July 22

Rank	Nation	Athletes	Time	Notes
1st place, gold medalist(s)	Jamaica	Peta-Gaye Gayle, Michelle Burgher, Michelle Ballentine, Allison Beckford	3:33.96	
2nd place, silver medalist(s)	Puerto Rico	Militza Castro, Beatriz Cruz, Yamelis Ortiz, Yvonne Harrison	3:36.40	
3rd place, bronze medalist(s)	Guatemala	Rossana Rodríguez, Luz Patricia Valenzuela, Sandra Oliveros, Ana Lucía Hurtado	3:58.03	

=== 10 kilometers walk ===
July 20

Rank	Name	Nationality	Time	Notes
1st place, gold medalist(s)	Rosario Sánchez	Mexico	45:47	CR
2nd place, silver medalist(s)	Teresita Collado	Guatemala	47:36	
3rd place, bronze medalist(s)	Ivis Martínez	El Salvador	48:02	
4	Abigail Sáenz	Mexico	48:31	
5	Elsa Segura	Mexico	52:04	
6	Zoila Reyes	Guatemala	53:54	
7	Mercedes Quezada	Dominican Republic	56:16	
8	Sandra Arroyo	Puerto Rico	56:30	

=== High jump ===
July 20

Rank	Name	Nationality	Result	Notes
1st place, gold medalist(s)	Levern Spencer	Saint Lucia	1.80	
2nd place, silver medalist(s)	Romary Rifka	Mexico	1.75	
3rd place, bronze medalist(s)	Lauren Maul	Barbados	1.75	
4	Mery Ann Roesch	Guatemala	1.55	

=== Pole vault ===
July 22

Rank	Name	Nationality	Result	Notes
1st place, gold medalist(s)	Katiuska Pérez	Cuba	3.85	CR
2nd place, silver medalist(s)	Lorena Espinoza	Mexico	3.45	
3rd place, bronze medalist(s)	Michelle Rivera	El Salvador	3.30	
4	Denisse Jerez	Guatemala	3.15	
	Peggy Ovalle	Guatemala	NM	
	Ana Leal	Mexico	NM	

=== Long jump ===
July 20

Rank	Name	Nationality	Result	Notes
1st place, gold medalist(s)	Elva Goulbourne	Jamaica	6.77	CR
2nd place, silver medalist(s)	Trecia-Kaye Smith	Jamaica	6.68	
3rd place, bronze medalist(s)	Betsabé Berríos	Puerto Rico	6.23	
4	Ayesha Maycock	Barbados	6.11	
5	Romary Rifka	Mexico	5.79	
6	Elisa Pérez	Dominican Republic	5.78	
7	Yennifer Arveláez	Venezuela	5.71	
8	María José Paiz	Guatemala	5.50	
9	Sabrina Asturias	Guatemala	5.24	
	Yesenia Rivera	Puerto Rico	NM	

=== Triple jump ===
July 22

Rank	Name	Nationality	Result	Notes
1st place, gold medalist(s)	Trecia-Kaye Smith	Jamaica	14.12	
2nd place, silver medalist(s)	Suzette Lee	Jamaica	13.75	
3rd place, bronze medalist(s)	Yusmay Bicet	Cuba	13.62	
4	Yennifer Arveláez	Venezuela	13.31	
5	Desiree Crichlow	Barbados	12.81	
6	Elisa Pérez	Dominican Republic	12.56	
7	María José Paiz	Guatemala	12.47	
7	Monica Martínez	Mexico	12.28	

=== Shot put ===
July 22

Rank	Name	Nationality	Result	Notes
1st place, gold medalist(s)	Misleydis González	Cuba	17.20	
2nd place, silver medalist(s)	Neolanis Suárez	Venezuela	13.90	
3rd place, bronze medalist(s)	Shernelle Nicholls	Barbados	13.49	
4	Ana Lucia Espinosa	Guatemala	11.62	
5	Chafree Bain	Bahamas	11.59	
6	Denise Taylor	Bahamas	10.96	
7	Verónica Monzón	Guatemala	10.94	

=== Discus throw ===
July 22

Rank	Name	Nationality	Result	Notes
1st place, gold medalist(s)	Yania Ferrales	Cuba	56.34	
2nd place, silver medalist(s)	Neolanis Suárez	Venezuela	48.64	
3rd place, bronze medalist(s)	Chafree Bain	Bahamas	46.25	
4	Ana Lucia Espinosa	Guatemala	43.05	
5	Shernelle Nicholls	Barbados	40.41	
6	Denise Taylor	Bahamas	33.46	
7	Rosita de León	Guatemala	24.25	
	Yéssica Gómez	Honduras	NM	

=== Hammer throw ===
July 20

Rank	Name	Nationality	Result	Notes
1st place, gold medalist(s)	Yunaika Crawford	Cuba	58.68	CR
2nd place, silver medalist(s)	Nancy Guillén	El Salvador	58.24	
3rd place, bronze medalist(s)	Violeta Guzmán	Mexico	54.92	
4	Amarilys Alméstica	Puerto Rico	53.72	
5	Dubraska Rodríguez	Venezuela	52.50	
6	Ana Lucia Espinosa	Guatemala	50.06	
7	Rosita de León	Guatemala	49.38	
8	Jéssica Ponce de León	Mexico	43.43	
9	Yéssica Gómez	Honduras	30.79	

=== Javelin throw ===
July 20

Rank	Name	Nationality	Result	Notes
1st place, gold medalist(s)	Laverne Eve	Bahamas	59.30	
2nd place, silver medalist(s)	Noraida Bicet	Cuba	57.04	
3rd place, bronze medalist(s)	Dalila Rugama	Nicaragua	42.19	
4	Aida Lorena Figueroa	Guatemala	38.88	
5	Ángela Téllez	Nicaragua	38.13	

=== Heptathlon ===
July 21–22

Rank	Name	Nationality	Result	Notes
1st place, gold medalist(s)	Shelia Acosta	Puerto Rico	5029	
2nd place, silver medalist(s)	Juana Espinal	Dominican Republic	4836	
3rd place, bronze medalist(s)	Beatriz Pompa	Mexico	4825	
