= Alfredo Romero (athlete) =

Puerto Rican discus thrower

Personal information
- Born: 5 March 1972 (age 54)

Sport
- Sport: Track and field
Medal record
Representing Puerto Rico
Central American and Caribbean Games
Silver medal – second place	2002 San Salvador	Discus throw
Bronze medal – third place	1998 Maracaibo	Discus throw

Alfredo Romero (born March 5, 1972) is a Puerto Rican track and field athlete specializing in the discus throw. He won multiple medals on regional level.

His personal best of 56.20 metres (2002) was the national record until 2012.

== Competition record ==
Year	Competition	Venue	Position	Event	Notes
Representing Puerto Rico
1988	Central American and Caribbean Junior Championships (U17)	Nassau, Bahamas	2nd	Shot (5 kg)	14.47 m
1988	Central American and Caribbean Junior Championships (U17)	Nassau, Bahamas	4th	Javelin (700g)	52.82 m
1990	Central American and Caribbean Junior Championships (U20)	Havana, Cuba	5th	Shot	14.01 m
1990	Central American and Caribbean Junior Championships (U20)	Havana, Cuba	5th	Discus	40.30 m
1991	Pan American Junior Championships	Kingston, Jamaica	7th	Shot	14.66 m
1991	Pan American Junior Championships	Kingston, Jamaica	5th	Discus	46.62 m
1993	Universiade	Buffalo, United States	23rd (q)	Discus	47.82 m
1993	Central American and Caribbean Championships	Cali, Colombia	2nd	Discus	50.82 m
1993	Central American and Caribbean Games	Ponce, Puerto Rico	4th	Discus	52.74 m
1995	Central American and Caribbean Championships	Guatemala City, Guatemala	2nd	Discus	52.54 m
1996	Ibero-American Championships	Medellín, Colombia	4th	Discus	51.70 m
1998	Central American and Caribbean Games	Maracaibo, Venezuela	3rd	Discus	50.83 m
1999	Central American and Caribbean Championships	Bridgetown, Barbados	2nd	Discus	53.00 m
1999	Pan American Games	Winnipeg, Canada	10th	Discus	51.16 m
2000	Ibero-American Championships	Rio de Janeiro, Brazil	7th	Discus	51.98 m
2001	Central American and Caribbean Championships	Guatemala City, Guatemala	2nd	Discus	52.04 m
2002	Central American and Caribbean Games	San Salvador, El Salvador	2nd	Discus	52.87 m
2003	Central American and Caribbean Championships	St. George's, Grenada	1st	Discus	54.09 m
2006	Ibero-American Championships	Ponce, Puerto Rico	6th	Discus	52.14 m
2006	Central American and Caribbean Games	Cartagena, Colombia	4th	Discus	52.47 m
2010	Ibero-American Championships	San Fernando, Spain	12th	Discus	50.78 m
2010	Central American and Caribbean Games	Mayagüez, Puerto Rico	6th	Discus	52.10 m
2011	Pan American Games	Guadalajara, Mexico	12th	Discus	47.94 m
