= Salvador Miranda (runner) =

Mexican former middle distance runner (born 1971)

Personal information
- Born: 22 August 1971 (age 54) Mexico City, Mexico

Sport
- Sport: Track and field
Medal record
Representing Mexico
Pan American Games
Bronze medal – third place	1995 Mar del Plata	3000m steeplechase
Central American and Caribbean Games
Gold medal – first place	1998 Maracaibo	3000m steeplechase
Silver medal – second place	2002 San Salvador	3000m steeplechase

José Salvador Miranda (born 22 August 1971 in Mexico City) is a Mexican former middle distance runner who competed in the 2000 Summer Olympics. His personal best in the 3000 metres steeplechase is 8:25.69 achieved in 2000. Until 2025, he maintains the Steeplechase record in Mexico. He now coaches the distance and middle distance runners from the athletics team of the Mexican college Instituto Tecnológico y de Estudios Superiores de Monterrey, Campus Ciudad de México in Mexico City.

Among his most important achievements, he has been granted with several recognitions from the UNAM, the Federación Mexicana de Asociaciones de Atletismo and the IAAF.

== Competition record ==
Year	Competition	Venue	Position	Event	Notes
Representing Mexico
1990	CAC Junior Championships (U20)	Havana, Cuba	3rd	3000 m s'chase	9:15.67
1994	Ibero-American Championships	Mar del Plata, Argentina	6th	3000m steeplechase	8:53.44
1997	Central American and Caribbean Championships	San Juan, Puerto Rico	2nd	3000 m s'chase	8:50.29
1998	Ibero-American Championships	Lisbon, Portugal	7th	3000 m s'chase	8:36.24
1998	Central American and Caribbean Games	Maracaibo, Venezuela	1st	3000 m s'chase	8:41.70
1999	Central American and Caribbean Championships	Bridgetown, Barbados	1st	3000 m s'chase	8:42.45
2000	Ibero-American Championships	Rio de Janeiro, Brazil	2nd	3000 m s'chase	8:28.80
2000	Olympic Games	Sydney, Australia	26th (h)	3000 m s'chase	8:35.79
2001	Central American and Caribbean Championships	Guatemala City, Guatemala	1st	1500 m	3:46.78
2001	Central American and Caribbean Championships	Guatemala City, Guatemala	1st	3000 m s'chase	8:50.36
2001	World Championships	Edmonton, Canada	22nd (h)	3000 m s'chase	8:49.47
2002	Ibero-American Championships	Guatemala City, Guatemala	1st	3000 m s'chase	8:47.79
2002	Central American and Caribbean Games	San Salvador, El Salvador	2nd	3000 m s'chase	8:48.18
2003	North American Men's Marathon Relay Championships	Akron, United States	1st	Marathon relay	2:05:30
2003	Pan American Games	Santo Domingo, Dom. Rep.	5th	3000 m s'chase	8:47.84
2004	North American Men's Marathon Relay Championships	Akron, United States	1st	Marathon relay	2:05:35
2004	Ibero-American Championships	Huelva, Spain	8th	3000 m s'chase	8:50.22
2005	Central American and Caribbean Championships	Nassau, Bahamas	4th	1500 m	3:53.83
2005	Central American and Caribbean Championships	Nassau, Bahamas	3rd	3000 m s'chase	9:11.67
2006	Ibero-American Championships	Ponce, Puerto Rico	13th	1500 m	3:53.15
2006	Ibero-American Championships	Ponce, Puerto Rico	5th	3000 m s'chase	8:48.63
2006	Central American and Caribbean Games	Cartagena, Colombia	4th	3000 m s'chase	8:53.31
