= 2006 Ibero-American Championships in Athletics =

XII Ibero-American Championships in Athletics
- Dates: 26 – 28 May 2006
- Host city: Ponce, Puerto Rico
- Venue: Estadio Francisco Montaner
- Events: 44
- Participation: 313 athletes from 23 nations
- Records set: 4 championship records

The 2006 Ibero-American Championships in Athletics (Spanish: XII Campeonato Iberoamericano de Atletismo) was the twelfth edition of the international athletics competition between Ibero-American nations that place at the Francisco Montaner Stadium in Ponce, Puerto Rico between 26–28 May.

It was the first time that Puerto Rico hosted the competition and it won eighteen medals, three of them gold. In the absence of a Cuban delegation, it was Brazil that dominated the championships, taking seventeen golds and 35 medals in total. Spain ranked a distant second with six golds and 23 medals. Colombia won four golds, while Argentina and the Dominican Republic each had three.

Only four championship records were broken at the competition: Germán Chiaraviglio and Fabiana Murer improved the men's and women's pole vault records, with Murer's mark being a South American record clearance. Juana Castillo set a new championship and national mark in the heptathlon, while Maíla Machado bettered the 100 metres hurdles time.

Brazil's Elisângela Adriano was the only athlete of the tournament to win two individual events as she completed a shot put and discus throw double. Other prominent performances were Javier Culson's win for the hosts in the 400 metres hurdles, Hudson de Souza and Jéssica Augusto's title defences over 3000 metres, and Irving Saladino's clearance of 8.42 m to win the long jump.

In spite of there generally being a lower standard of performances than at previous meets, some athletes improved their national records. Amarilys Alméstica won the hammer throw with a Puerto Rican record, while her silver medal-winning teammates in the 4×100 metres relay also beat their national mark on home soil. Lower down the order, Peru's César Barquero improved the 800 m national mark and Gabriela Traña broke the Costa Rican record for the steeplechase.

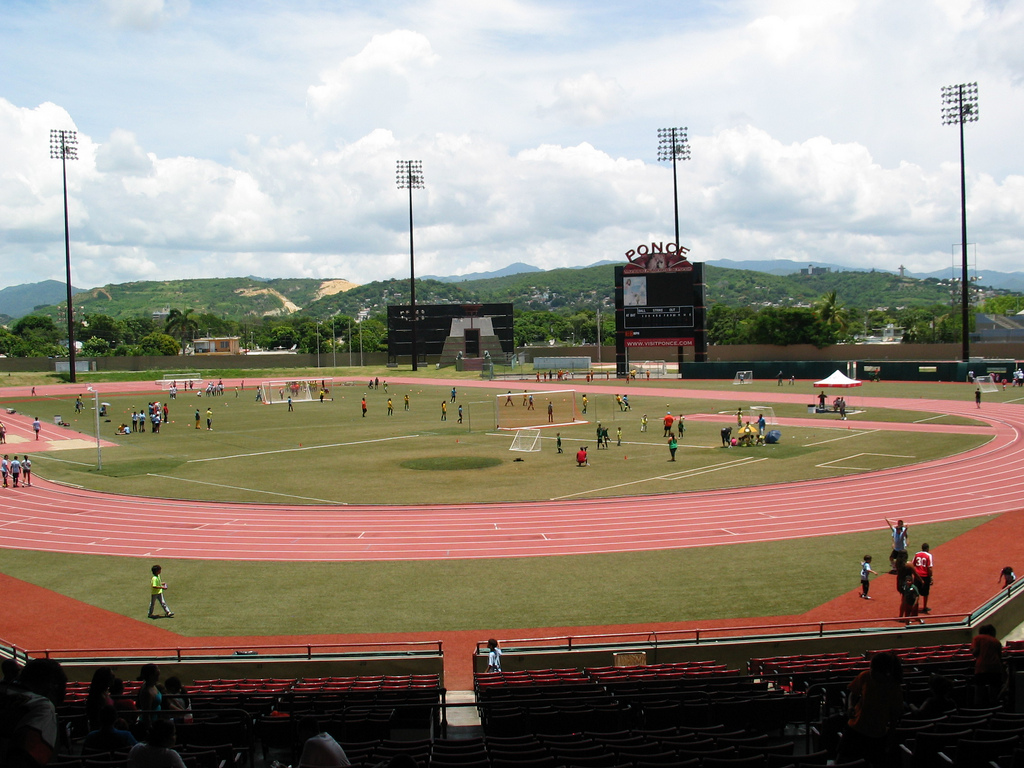
Host stadium in Ponce.

== Medal summary ==
=== Men ===
Event	Gold		Silver		Bronze	
100 metres (wind: +0.3 m/s)	Vicente de Lima (BRA)	10.22	Kael Becerra (CHI)	10.32	Heber Viera (URU)	10.45
200 metres (wind: +1.8 m/s)	Juan Pedro Toledo (MEX)	20.74	Heber Viera (URU)	20.80	Basílio de Moraes (BRA)	20.84
400 metres	Andrés Silva (URU)	45.35	Arismendy Peguero (DOM)	45.91	David Testa (ESP)	46.46
800 metres	Osmar dos Santos (BRA)	1:46.22	Fadrique Iglesias (BOL)	1:48.16 NR	Eduard Villanueva (VEN)	1:48.31
1500 metres	Diego Ruiz (ESP)	3:46.99	Víctor Riobó (ESP)	3:47.37	Luis Daniel Soto (PUR)	3:47.48
3000 metres	Hudson de Souza (BRA)	8:08.62	Javier Carriqueo (ARG)	8:09.20	Francisco España (ESP)	8:09.43
5000 metres	Marílson Gomes dos Santos (BRA)	13:42.88	Álvaro Jiménez (ESP)	14:03.37	José Rocha (POR)	14:07.51
110 metres hurdles (wind: +1.2 m/s)	Anselmo da Silva (BRA)	13.51	Redelén dos Santos (BRA)	13.72	Enrique Llanos (PUR)	13.86
400 metres hurdles	Javier Culson (PUR)	49.71	Luis Montenegro (CHI)	50.22	José María Romera (ESP)	50.84
3000 metres steeplechase	Alexander Greaux (PUR)	8:35.89	Fernando Alex Fernandes (BRA)	8:36.97	Francisco Javier Lara (ESP)	8:37.78
4×100 metres relay	Dominican Republic (DOM); Irving Guerrero; Joel Báez; Juan Sainfleur; Carlos García	39.65	Brazil (BRA); Anselmo da Silva; Basílio de Moraes; Vicente de Lima; Luís Ambrosio	40.52	Puerto Rico (PUR); Luis López; Roberto Rivera; Jorge Richardson; Emilio Rivera	40.59
4×400 metres relay	Dominican Republic (DOM); Pedro Mejía; Juan Betances; Yoel Tapia; Arismendy Peguero	3:06.11	Puerto Rico (PUR); Fabián Martínez; Javier Culson; Christian Santiago; Félix Martínez	3:07.27	Brazil (BRA); Luís Ambrosio; Sanderlei Parrela; Thiago Chyaromont; Anderson Jorge dos Santos	3:25.18
20,000 metres walk	Rolando Saquipay (ECU)	1:28:48.36	José Ignacio Díaz (ESP)	1:30:43.27	Sérgio Galdino (BRA)	1:32:50.12
High jump	Jessé de Lima (BRA)	2.24 m	Gilmar Mayo (COL)	2.20 m	Gerardo Martínez (MEX)	2.16 m
Pole vault	Germán Chiaraviglio (ARG)	5.70 m CR	Fábio Gomes da Silva (BRA)	5.65 m	José Francisco Nava (CHI)	5.25 m
Long jump	Irving Saladino (PAN)	8.42 m	Carlos Jorge (DOM)	7.84 m	Allen Simms (PUR)	7.67 m
Triple jump	Jefferson Sabino (BRA)	16.81 m	Allen Simms (PUR)	16.60 m	Leisner Aragón (COL)	15.94 m
Shot put	Yojer Medina (VEN)	18.79 m	Borja Vivas (ESP)	18.66 m	Marco Antonio Verni (CHI)	18.48 m
Discus throw	Jorge Balliengo (ARG)	59.62 m	Marcelo Pugliese (ARG)	53.46 m	Héctor Hurtado (VEN)	53.43 m
Hammer throw	Juan Ignacio Cerra (ARG)	69.38 m	Dário Manso (POR)	69.17 m	Wagner Domingos (BRA)	66.06 m
Javelin throw	Júlio César de Oliveira (BRA)	78.91 m	Luiz Fernando da Silva (BRA)	73.83 m	Pablo Pietrobelli (ARG)	72.50 m
Decathlon	Óscar González (ESP)	7498 pts	David Gómez (ESP)	7400 pts	Jorge Naranjo (CHI)	6886 pts

=== Women ===
Event	Gold		Silver		Bronze	
100 metres (wind: -1.1 m/s)	Franciela Krasucki (BRA)	11.61	Belén Recio (ESP)	11.66	Celiangeli Morales (PUR)	11.72
200 metres (wind: +0.3 m/s)	Felipa Palacios (COL)	23.03	Darlenys Obregón (COL)	23.23	Militza Castro (PUR)	23.46
400 metres	Norma González (COL)	52.87	Maria Laura Almirão (BRA)	53.61	Mayra González (MEX)	53.64
800 metres	Rosibel García (COL)	2:01.62	Gabriela Medina (MEX)	2:03.43	Lizaira Del Valle (PUR)	2:03.76
1500 metres	Isabel Macías (ESP)	4:21.65	Lizaira Del Valle (PUR)	4:23.35	Angélica Sánchez (MEX)	4:25.73
3000 metres	Jéssica Augusto (POR)	9:06.74	Lucélia Peres (BRA)	9:15.79	Bertha Sánchez (COL)	9:19.04
5000 metres	Bertha Sánchez (COL)	16:10.32	Lucélia Peres (BRA)	16:13.67	Zenaida Maldonado (PUR)	17:09.70
100 metres hurdles (wind: -0.2 m/s)	Maíla Machado (BRA)	13.02 CR	Gilvaneide Oliveira (BRA)	13.39	Francisca Guzmán (CHI)	13.45
400 metres hurdles	Laia Forcadell (ESP)	57.26	Perla dos Santos (BRA)	58.24	Yvonne Harrison (PUR)	58.56
3000 metres steeplechase	Zenaide Vieira (BRA)	9:55.95	Teresa Urbina (ESP)	10:05.74	Tamara Sanfabio (ESP)	10:13.66
4×100 metres relay	Brazil (BRA); Maíla Machado; Franciela Krasucki; Tathiana Ignácio; Luciana dos Santos	44.49	Puerto Rico (PUR); Roxana Mercado; Militza Castro; Jennifer Gutiérrez; Celiangeli Morales	44.50 NR	Colombia (COL); Melisa Murillo; Felipa Palacios; Darlenys Obregón; Norma González	44.79
4×400 metres relay	Mexico (MEX); Ruth Grajeda; Gabriela Medina; Mayra González; Nallely Vela	3:33.56	Colombia (COL); Rosibel García; Muriel Coneo; Darlenys Obregón; Norma González	3:37.71	Puerto Rico (PUR); Beatriz Cruz; Maritza Salas; Arelys Caro; Lizaira Del Valle	3:38.51
10,000 metres walk	Ana Cabecinha (POR)	45:45.03	Evelyn Núñez (GUA)	46:19.48 NR	María José Poves (ESP)	46:24.09
High jump	Marta Mendía (ESP)	1.84 m	Juana Arrendel (DOM)	1.84 m	Marierlis Rojas (VEN)	1.84 m
Pole vault	Fabiana Murer (BRA)	4.56 m CR AR	Joana Costa (BRA); Mari Mar Sánchez (ESP)	4.10 m 4.10 m	Not awarded	
Long jump	Keila Costa (BRA)	6.54 m	Luciana dos Santos (BRA)	6.25 m	Adriana Severino (DOM)	6.09 m
Triple jump	Patricia Sarrapio (ESP)	13.82 m	Johanna Triviño (COL)	13.55 m	Gisele de Oliveira (BRA)	13.35 m
Shot put	Elisângela Adriano (BRA)	16.99 m	Irache Quintanal (ESP)	16.20 m	Rocío Comba (ARG)	15.11 m
Discus throw	Elisângela Adriano (BRA)	58.67 m	Irache Quintanal (ESP)	53.77 m	Marianne Berndt (CHI)	50.05 m
Hammer throw	Amarilys Alméstica (PUR)	66.21 m NR	Vânia Silva (POR)	64.59 m	Dolores Pedrares (ESP)	64.52 m
Javelin throw	Alessandra Resende (BRA)	55.12 m	Coralys Ortiz (PUR)	37.86 m	Two entrants only	
Heptathlon	Juana Castillo (DOM)	5860 pts CR NR	Elizete da Silva (BRA)	5468 pts	Francia Manzanillo (DOM)	5448 pts

== Medal table ==
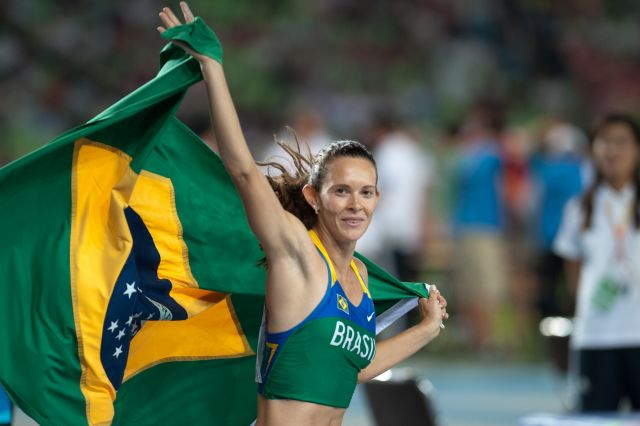
Fabiana Murer broke regional and championship pole vault records.

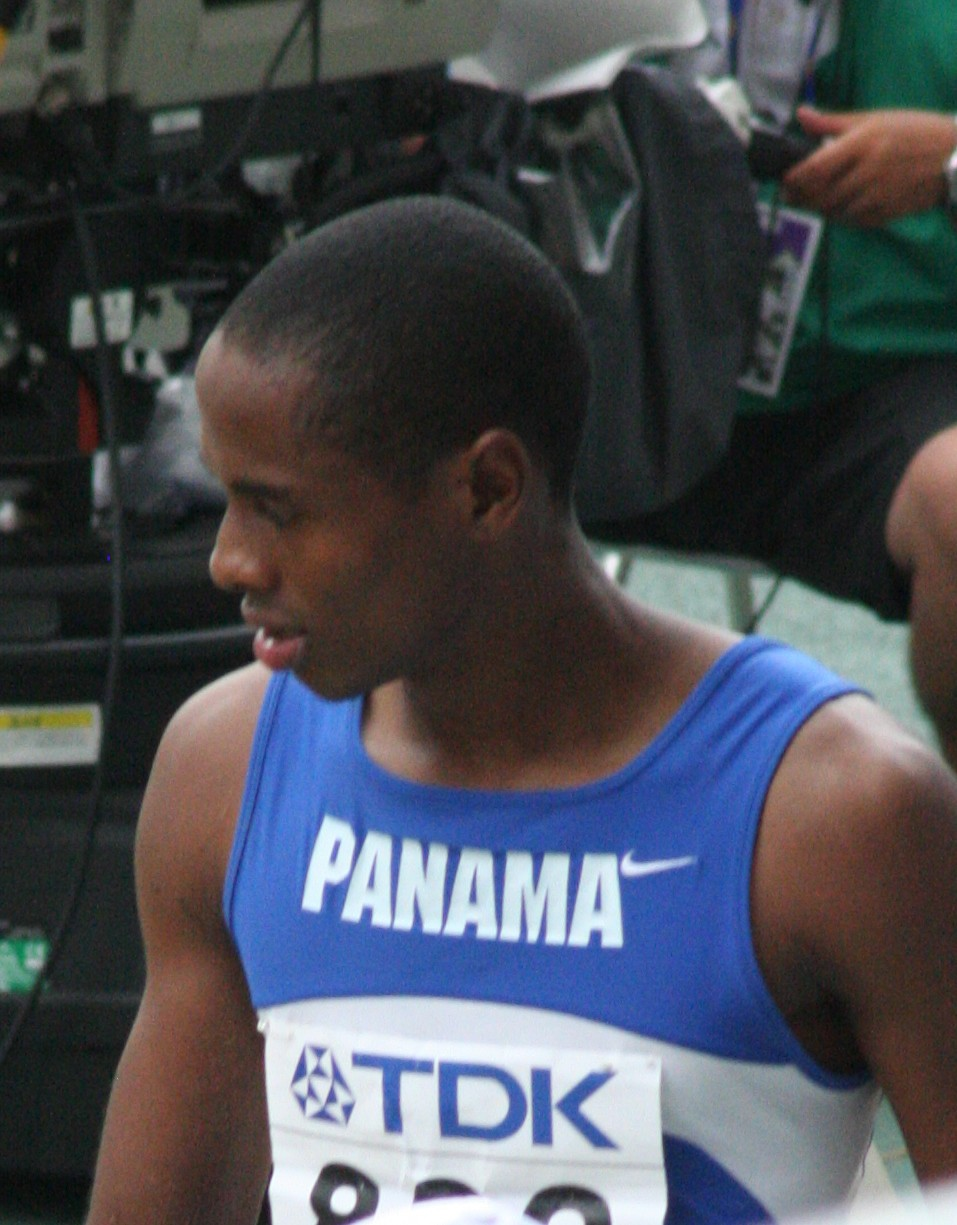
Irving Saladino won Panama's sole medal in the men's long jump.

* Host nation (Puerto Rico)

Rank	Nation	Gold	Silver	Bronze	Total
1	Brazil	17	13	5	35
2	Spain	6	10	7	23
3	Colombia	4	4	3	11
4	Puerto Rico*	3	5	10	18
5	Dominican Republic	3	3	2	8
6	Argentina	3	2	2	7
7	Portugal	2	2	1	5
8	Mexico	2	1	3	6
9	Uruguay	1	1	1	3
10	Venezuela	1	0	3	4
11	Ecuador	1	0	0	1
11	Panama	1	0	0	1
13	Chile	0	2	5	7
14	Bolivia	0	1	0	1
14	Guatemala	0	1	0	1
Totals (15 entries)		44	45	42	131

- Note: The official medal count from the 2010 RFEA report incorrectly states that Chile won four silvers and six bronze medals. Furthermore, it does not list Heber Viera's 200 m silver medal in Uruguay's tally.

== Participation ==
Of the twenty-nine member nations of the Asociación Iberoamericana de Atletismo twenty-three sent delegations to the 2006 championships. Andorra, admitted into the organisation in 2005, competed for the first time. All the African nations, except for Angola, were absent, as was the region leader Cuba. A total of 313 athletes took part at the event.

- Andorra (3)
- Angola (7)
- Argentina (16)
- Bolivia (2)
- Brazil (48)
- Chile (13)
- Colombia (23)
- Costa Rica (2)
- Dominican Republic (38)
- Ecuador (1)
- Guatemala (8)
- Honduras (3)
- Mexico (19)
- Nicaragua (1)
- Panama (2)
- Paraguay (1)
- Peru (1)
- Portugal (8)
- Puerto Rico (63)
- El Salvador (3)
- Spain (35)
- Uruguay (4)
- Venezuela (12)
