= Amarilys Alméstica =

Puerto Rican hammer thrower (1981–2024)

Personal information
- Born: February 12, 1981 San Juan, Puerto Rico
- Died: October 5, 2024 (aged 43)

Sport
- Sport: Track and field
Medal record
Athletics
Representing Puerto Rico
Central American and Caribbean Games
Gold medal – first place	2002 San Salvador	Hammer throw
CAC Junior Championships (U20)
Bronze medal – third place	2000 San Juan	Hammer throw

Amarilys Alméstica Rivera (February 12, 1981 – October 5, 2024) was a hammer thrower from San Juan, Puerto Rico. She set her personal best throw (66.57 metres) on July 3, 2006, at a meet in Ottawa, Ontario, Canada. Alméstica died on October 5, 2024, at the age of 43.

== Achievements ==
Year	Competition	Venue	Position	Notes
Representing Puerto Rico
2000	Central American and Caribbean Junior Championships	San Juan, Puerto Rico	3rd	44.45 m
2001	Central American and Caribbean Championships	Guatemala City, Guatemala	4th	53.72 m
2002	Ibero-American Championships	Guatemala City, Guatemala	8th	54.48 m
2002	Central American and Caribbean Games	San Salvador, El Salvador	1st	60.39 m
2003	Universiade	Daegu, South Korea	11th	53.58 m
2004	Ibero-American Championships	Huelva, Spain	6th	61.99 m
2005	Central American and Caribbean Championships	Nassau, Bahamas	9th	48.66 m
2005	World Championships	Helsinki, Finland	30th (q)	56.66 m
2006	Ibero-American Championships	Ponce, Puerto Rico	1st	66.21 m
2006	Central American and Caribbean Games	Cartagena, Colombia	4th	62.69 m
2007	NACAC Championships	San Salvador, El Salvador	4th	57.40 m
2007	Pan American Games	Rio de Janeiro, Brazil	11th	61.44 m
