= Juan Pedro Toledo =

Mexican sprinter (born 1978)

Personal information
- Born: June 17, 1978 (age 48) Huatabampo, Sonora, Mexico
Medal record
Men's Athletics
Representing Mexico
Central American and Caribbean Games
Gold medal – first place	1998 Maracaibo	200 m
Gold medal – first place	2002 San Salvador	200 m
Central American Championships
Silver medal – second place	2001 Guatemala City	200 m

Juan Pedro Toledo Domínguez (born 17 June 1978) is a Mexican sprint athlete. He twice won the gold medal in the men's 200 metres at the Central American and Caribbean Games, and competed for his native country at two consecutive Summer Olympics, starting in 2000.

His grandfather, Jose Octavio Toledo Elguezabal, was a prominent radio personality in Huatabampo who died in 2009.

Toledo was inducted into the Sonora Sports Hall of Fame class of 2011, as well as the Huatabampo Sports Hall of Fame inaugural class of 2017. Additionally, the Juan Pedro Toledo Domínguez Athletics Track was inaugurated in his hometown in 2014.

== Competition record ==
Year	Competition	Venue	Position	Event	Notes
Representing Mexico
1994	CAC Junior Championships (U17)	Port of Spain, Trinidad and Tobago	5th	Long jump	6.53 m
1996	CAC Junior Championships (U20)	San Salvador, El Salvador	7th	200 m	22.34
1996	CAC Junior Championships (U20)	San Salvador, El Salvador	5th	Long jump	7.17 m
1996	World Junior Championships	Sydney, Australia	29th (q)	Long jump	6.94 m (wind: -0.3 m/s)
1997	World Indoor Championships	Paris, France	9th (h)	4 × 400 m relay	3:11.41
1997	Pan American Junior Championships	Havana, Cuba	3rd	200 m	21.31
1997	Pan American Junior Championships	Havana, Cuba	7th	400 m	47.19
1997	World Championships	Athens, Greece	69th (h)	100 m	10.56
1997	World Championships	Athens, Greece	48th (h)	200 m	21.03
1997	World Championships	Athens, Greece	25th (h)	4 × 100 m relay	39.93
1998	Ibero-American Championships	Lisbon, Portugal	2nd	400 m	45.63
1998	Ibero-American Championships	Lisbon, Portugal	2nd	4 × 100 m relay	40.49
1998	Ibero-American Championships	Lisbon, Portugal	1st	4 × 400 m relay	3:06.12
1998	Central American and Caribbean Games	Maracaibo, Venezuela	1st	200 m	20.46
1998	Central American and Caribbean Games	Maracaibo, Venezuela	6th	400 m	46.17
1998	Central American and Caribbean Games	Maracaibo, Venezuela	4th	4 × 400 m relay	3:04.80
1999	World Indoor Championships	Maebashi, Japan	10th (sf)	200 m	21.13
1999	Pan American Games	Winnipeg, Canada	5th	200 m	21.05
1999	Pan American Games	Winnipeg, Canada	16th (h)	400 m	46.80
1999	World Championships	Seville, Spain	45th (h)	200 m	21.00
2000	Olympic Games	Sydney, Australia	53rd (h)	400 m	46.82
2001	Central American and Caribbean Championships	Guatemala City, Guatemala	2nd	200 m	20.82
2001	World Championships	Edmonton, Canada	24th (h)	200 m	20.80
2001	World Championships	Edmonton, Canada	14th (h)	4 × 400 m relay	3:03.19 (NR)
2001	Universiade	Beijing, China	16th (sf)	200 m	21.20
2002	Central American and Caribbean Games	San Salvador, El Salvador	1st	200m	20.97 (wind: -0.4 m/s)
2002	Central American and Caribbean Games	San Salvador, El Salvador	3rd	400m	46.79
2002	Central American and Caribbean Games	San Salvador, El Salvador	4th	4 × 400 m relay	3:09.64
2003	Pan American Games	Santo Domingo, Dominican Republic	17th (sf)	200 m	21.41
2003	Universiade	Daegu, South Korea	7th	200 m	21.94
2004	Ibero-American Championships	Huelva, Spain	4th	200 m	10.48
2004	Ibero-American Championships	Huelva, Spain	1st	200 m	20.84
2004	Olympic Games	Athens, Greece	10th (sf)	200 m	20.64
2005	World Championships	Helsinki, Finland	20th (h)	200 m	20.78
2006	Ibero-American Championships	Ponce, Puerto Rico	4th	100 m	10.45
2006	Ibero-American Championships	Ponce, Puerto Rico	1st	200 m	20.74
2007	Pan American Games	Rio de Janeiro, Brazil	17th (h)	200 m	21.24
2007	World Championships	Osaka, Japan	38th (h)	200 m	21.31
