= Beatriz Cruz =

Puerto Rican track and field athlete

Beatriz Cruz Nazario
Personal information
- Full name: Beatriz Cruz Nazario
- Born: June 15, 1980 (age 46) Jayuya, Puerto Rico
- Height: 1.65 m (5 ft 5 in)
- Weight: 56 kg (123 lb)

Sport
- Country: Puerto Rico
- Sport: Athletics
- Event: Sprint
- Updated on 4 January 2015

Beatriz Cruz Nazario (born June 15, 1980) is a Puerto Rican female track and field athlete, who competes in the sprints events. She represented her native country at the 2000 Summer Olympics, where she was eliminated in the first round of the women's 4x400 metres relay competition, alongside Militza Castro, Sandra Moya and Maritza Salas. Cruz ran the third leg in the heat 2 race.

== Personal bests ==
Event	Result	Venue	Date
100 m	11.67 s (wind: +1.1 m/s)	Waltham, United States	20 Apr 2008
100 m	11.5 s (wind: +0.8 m/s) (ht)	Cali, Colombia	4 Jul 2008
200 m	23.99 s (wind: +1.9 m/s)	Mayagüez, Puerto Rico	5 May 2012
400 m	53.50 s	Guatemala City, Guatemala	12 May 2002
Long jump	6.04 m (wind: +1.0 m/s)	San Juan, Puerto Rico	13 Jan 2007

== Achievements ==
Year	Competition	Venue	Position	Event	Notes
Representing Puerto Rico
1996	Central American and Caribbean; Junior Championships (U17)	San Salvador, El Salvador	4th	4 × 100 m	48.52
1996	Central American and Caribbean; Junior Championships (U17)	San Salvador, El Salvador	4th	4 × 400 m	4:06.73
1998	Central American and Caribbean; Junior Championships (U20)	Georgetown, Cayman Islands	8th	100m	12.57 (+0.7 m/s)
1998	Central American and Caribbean; Junior Championships (U20)	Georgetown, Cayman Islands	8th	400m	60.30
1998	Central American and Caribbean; Junior Championships (U20)	Georgetown, Cayman Islands	3rd	4 × 100 m	47.49
1998	Central American and Caribbean; Junior Championships (U20)	Georgetown, Cayman Islands	3rd	4 × 400 m	3:54.89
2000	Ibero-American Championships	Rio de Janeiro, Brazil	2nd	4 × 400 m	3:34.95
2000	Olympic Games	Sydney, Australia	18th (h)	4 × 400 m	3:33.30
2001	Central American and Caribbean Championships	Guatemala City, Guatemala	3rd	400m	53.90 A
2001	Central American and Caribbean Championships	Guatemala City, Guatemala	2nd	4 × 400 m	3:36.40 A
2002	Ibero-American Championships	Guatemala City, Guatemala	4th	400m	53.50 A
2002	Ibero-American Championships	Guatemala City, Guatemala	3rd	4 × 400 m	3:34.26 A
2002	Central American and Caribbean Games	San Salvador, El Salvador	2nd	4 × 400 m	3:35.94
2006	Ibero-American Championships	Ponce, Puerto Rico	3rd	4 × 400 m	3:38.51
2007	NACAC Championships	San Salvador, El Salvador	4th	4 × 100 m	45.08
2007	Pan American Games	Rio de Janeiro, Brazil	4th	4 × 100 m	43.81
2008	Ibero-American Championships	Iquique, Chile	—	4 × 100 m	DNF
2008	Central American and Caribbean Championships	Cali, Colombia	5th (h)	100 m	11.5 (ht) A
2008	Central American and Caribbean Championships	Cali, Colombia	4th	4 × 100 m	44.34 A
2010	Ibero-American Championships	San Fernando, Spain	—^{1}	100m	11.79 (+0.6 m/s)
2010	Ibero-American Championships	San Fernando, Spain	—	4 × 100 m	DQ
2010	Ibero-American Championships	San Fernando, Spain	—	4 × 400 m	DQ
2010	Central American and Caribbean Games	Mayagüez, Puerto Rico	—	4 × 100 m	DQ
2010	Central American and Caribbean Games	Mayagüez, Puerto Rico	5th	4 × 400 m	3:44.00
2011	Central American and Caribbean Championships	Mayagüez, Puerto Rico	13th (h)	100m	11.93 (-1.6 m/s)
2011	Central American and Caribbean Championships	Mayagüez, Puerto Rico	—	4 × 100 m	DNF
2011	Central American and Caribbean Championships	Mayagüez, Puerto Rico	5th	4 × 400 m	3:39.37
2012	Ibero-American Championships	Barquisimeto, Venezuela	10th (h)	100 m	11.98 (-4.2 m/s)
2012	Ibero-American Championships	Barquisimeto, Venezuela	12th (h)	200 m	24.09 (+0.1 m/s)
2014	World Relays	Nassau, Bahamas	12th (B)	4 × 100 m	43.99
2014	Pan American Sports Festival	Mexico City, Mexico	9th (h)	100 m	11.94 A (-0.4 m/s)
2014	Central American and Caribbean Games	Xalapa, Mexico	4th	4 × 100 m	44.33 A
2015	NACAC Championships	San José, Costa Rica	2nd	4 × 100 m	43.51
2016	Ibero-American Championships	Rio de Janeiro, Brazil	13th (h)	100 m	11.70
2016	Ibero-American Championships	Rio de Janeiro, Brazil	1st	4 × 100 m	43.55

^{1}: Extra run out of competition.
