= Militza Castro =

Puerto Rican athletics competitor (born 1976)

Personal information
- Born: March 13, 1976 (age 50)

Sport
- Sport: Track and field
Medal record
Representing Puerto Rico
Central American and Caribbean Games
Silver medal – second place	2002 San Salvador	4x400m relay
CAC Junior Championships (U20)
Bronze medal – third place	1994 Port of Spain	400 m
CAC Junior Championships (U17)
Gold medal – first place	1992 Tegucigalpa	400 m
Gold medal – first place	1992 Tegucigalpa	4x100 m relay
Bronze medal – third place	1992 Tegucigalpa	200 m

Militza Castro Morales (born March 13, 1976) is a retired female track and field athlete, who competed in the sprints events during her career.

She represented her native country at the 2000 Summer Olympics, where she was eliminated in the first round of the women's 4x400 metres relay competition, alongside Sandra Moya, Beatriz Cruz and Maritza Salas. Castro ran the first leg in the heat 2 race.

== International competitions ==
Year	Competition	Venue	Position	Event	Notes
Representing Puerto Rico
1990	Central American and Caribbean; Junior Championships (U-17)	Havana, Cuba	8th	200 m	25.86 (0.2 m/s)
1990	Central American and Caribbean; Junior Championships (U-17)	Havana, Cuba	5th (h)	400 m	66.17
1990	Central American and Caribbean; Junior Championships (U-17)	Havana, Cuba	4th	4 × 400 m relay	3:58.88
1992	Central American and Caribbean; Junior Championships (U-17)	Tegucigalpa, Honduras	3rd	200 m	25.2 (-0.1 m/s)
1992	Central American and Caribbean; Junior Championships (U-17)	Tegucigalpa, Honduras	1st	400 m	56.6
1992	Central American and Caribbean; Junior Championships (U-17)	Tegucigalpa, Honduras	1st	4 × 100 m relay	46.7
1993	Central American and Caribbean Games	Ponce, Puerto Rico	6th	400 m	56.55
1993	Central American and Caribbean Games	Ponce, Puerto Rico	4th	4 × 400 m relay	3:39.51
1994	Central American and Caribbean Junior; Championships (U-20)	Port of Spain, Trinidad and Tobago	3rd	400 m	54.0
1994	World Junior Championships	Lisbon, Portugal	15th (sf)	200 m	24.62 (+1.0 m/s)
1994	World Junior Championships	Lisbon, Portugal	27th (h)	400 m	56.16
1997	Central American and Caribbean Championships	San Juan, Puerto Rico	3rd	4 × 400 m relay	3:39.07
1999	Central American and Caribbean Championships	Bridgetown, Barbados	2nd	4 × 100 m relay	45.34
1999	Central American and Caribbean Championships	Bridgetown, Barbados	3rd	4 × 400 m relay	3:39.75
1999	Universiade	Palma, Spain	7th	4 × 100 m relay	45.49
2000	Olympic Games	Sydney, Australia	18th (h)	4 × 400 m relay	3:33.30 NR
2001	Central American and Caribbean Championships	Guatemala City, Guatemala	4th	400 m	54.08
2001	World Championships	Edmonton, Canada	12th (h)	4 × 400 m relay	3:30.81 NR
2002	Ibero-American Championships	Guatemala City, Guatemala	3rd	4 × 400 m relay	3:34.26
2002	Central American and Caribbean Games	San Salvador, El Salvador	2nd	4 × 400 m relay	3:35.94
2003	Central American and Caribbean Championships	St. George's, Grenada	8th	400 m	53.56
2003	Central American and Caribbean Championships	St. George's, Grenada	3rd	4 × 100 m relay	3:33.35
2003	Pan American Games	Santo Domingo, Dominican Republic	6th	4 × 400 m relay	3:32.28
2004	Ibero-American Championships	Huelva, Spain	7th	200 m	24.42 (-2.2 m/s)
2006	Ibero-American Championships	Ponce, Puerto Rico	3rd	200 m	23.46 (0.3 m/s)
2006	Ibero-American Championships	Ponce, Puerto Rico	2nd	4 × 100 m relay	44.50 NR
2006	Central American and Caribbean Games	Cartagena, Colombia	5th	200 metres	23.67
2006	Central American and Caribbean Games	Cartagena, Colombia	4th	4 × 100 m relay	45.05
