= Sandra Moya =

Personal information
- Born: February 14, 1974 (age 52)

Sport
- Sport: Track and field
Medal record
Representing Puerto Rico
Central American and Caribbean Games
Silver medal – second place	2002 San Salvador	4x400 m relay
CAC Junior Championships (U20)
Silver medal – second place	1992 Tegucigalpa	4x400 m relay
Bronze medal – third place	1992 Tegucigalpa	800 m

Sandra Elisa Moya Torres-Cablayan (born February 14, 1974) is a retired female track and field athlete, who competed in the sprints events during her career.

She represented her native country at the 2000 Summer Olympics, where she was eliminated in the first round of the women's 4x400 metres relay competition, alongside Militza Castro, Beatriz Cruz and Maritza Salas. Moya ran the second leg in the heat 2 race.

== International competitions ==
Year	Competition	Venue	Position	Event	Notes
Representing Puerto Rico
1992	Central American and Caribbean Junior Championships (U-20)	Tegucigalpa, Honduras	3rd	800 m	2:18.1
1992	Central American and Caribbean Junior Championships (U-20)	Tegucigalpa, Honduras	2nd	4x400 m	3:56.0
1993	Universiade	Buffalo, United States	7th	4x400 m	3:54.85
1995	Universiade	Fukuoka, Japan	28th (h)	800 m	2:14.97
1996	Ibero-American Championships	Medellín, Colombia	7th	800 m	2:10.64
1997	Central American and Caribbean Championships	San Juan, Puerto Rico	6th	800 m	2:07.78
1997	Central American and Caribbean Championships	San Juan, Puerto Rico	3rd	4x400 m	3:39.07
1999	Central American and Caribbean Championships	Bridgetown, Barbados	3rd	4x400 m	3:39.75
2000	Ibero-American Championships	Rio de Janeiro, Brazil	3rd	800 m	2:05.61
2000	Ibero-American Championships	Rio de Janeiro, Brazil	2nd	4x400 m	3:34.95
2000	Olympic Games	Sydney, Australia	18th (h)	4x400 m	3:33.30 NR
2001	Central American and Caribbean Championships	Guatemala City, Guatemala	3rd	800 m	2:05.45
2001	World Championships	Edmonton, Canada	12th (h)	4x400 m	3:30.81 NR
2002	Ibero-American Championships	Guatemala City, Guatemala	2nd	800 m	2:06.71
2002	Ibero-American Championships	Guatemala City, Guatemala	3rd	4x400 m	3:34.26
2002	Central American and Caribbean Games	San Salvador, El Salvador	4th	800 m	2:06.72
2002	Central American and Caribbean Games	San Salvador, El Salvador	2nd	4x400 m	3:35.94
2003	Pan American Games	Santo Domingo, Dominican Republic	11th (h)	800 m	2:05.52
2003	Pan American Games	Santo Domingo, Dominican Republic	6th	4x400 m	3:32.28
