= Celiangeli Morales =

Puerto Rican sprinter

Personal information
- Born: 2 November 1985 (age 40) York, Pennsylvania

Sport
- Sport: Track and field
- Event(s): 100 metres, 200 metres
- Updated on 29 August 2015

Celiangeli Morales Meléndez (born 2 November 1985) is a sprinter from Puerto Rico. She competed in the 200 metres at the 2015 World Championships in Athletics in Beijing without advancing from the first round.

== International competitions ==
Year	Competition	Venue	Position	Event	Notes
Representing Puerto Rico
2006	Ibero-American Championships	Ponce, Puerto Rico	3rd	100 m	11.72
2006	Ibero-American Championships	Ponce, Puerto Rico	2nd	4 × 100 m relay	44.50
2006	NACAC U23 Championships	Santo Domingo, Dominican Republic	7th	100 m	12.03
2006	NACAC U23 Championships	Santo Domingo, Dominican Republic	2nd	4 × 100 m relay	46.60
2006	Central American and Caribbean Games	Cartagena, Colombia	4th	4 × 100 m relay	45.05
2007	NACAC Championships	San Salvador, El Salvador	12th (h)	100 m	12.02
2007	NACAC Championships	San Salvador, El Salvador	4th	4 × 100 m relay	45.08
2007	Pan American Games	Rio de Janeiro, Brazil	4th	4 × 100 m relay	43.81
2007	Universiade	Bangkok, Thailand	17th (qf)	100 m	11.92
2008	Ibero-American Championships	Iquique, Chile	2nd (h)	100 m	11.93^{1}
2008	Ibero-American Championships	Iquique, Chile	–	4 × 100 m relay	DQ
2008	Central American and Caribbean Championships	Cali, Colombia	20th (h)	100 m	11.87
2008	Central American and Caribbean Championships	Cali, Colombia	4th	4 × 100 m relay	44.34
2009	Central American and Caribbean Championships	Havana, Cuba	5th	4 × 100 m relay	44.08
2010	Ibero-American Championships	San Fernando, Spain	1st (extra)	100 m	11.70
2010	Ibero-American Championships	San Fernando, Spain	–	4 × 100 m relay	DQ
2010	Central American and Caribbean Games	Mayagüez, Puerto Rico	–	4 × 100 m relay	DQ
2014	IAAF World Relays	Nassau, Bahamas	4th (B)	4 × 100 m relay	43.99
2014	Central American and Caribbean Games	Xalapa, Mexico	4th	4 × 100 m relay	44.33
2015	Pan American Games	Toronto, Canada	6th	4 × 100 m relay	44.27
2015	NACAC Championships	San José, Costa Rica	6th	100 m	11.47
2015	NACAC Championships	San José, Costa Rica	5th	200 m	23.03
2015	NACAC Championships	San José, Costa Rica	2nd	4 × 100 m relay	43.51
2015	World Championships	Beijing, China	39th (h)	200 m	23.34
2016	Ibero-American Championships	Rio de Janeiro, Brazil	6th	100 m	11.50
2016	Ibero-American Championships	Rio de Janeiro, Brazil	9th (h)	200 m	23.83
2016	Ibero-American Championships	Rio de Janeiro, Brazil	1st	4 × 100 m relay	43.55
2016	Olympic Games	Rio de Janeiro, Brazil	49th (h)	200 m	23.39

^{1}Disqualified in the final

== Personal bests ==
Outdoor

- 100 metres – 11.39 (0.0 m/s, Mayagüez 2014)
- 200 metres – 23.00 (+0.8 m/s, Rio de Janeiro 2016)
