= Óscar González (decathlete) =

Spanish decathlete

Óscar González Garrido (born 8 August 1976 in Antequera, Málaga) is decathlete from Spain.

== Achievements ==
| Year | Competition | Venue | Position | Event | Notes |
Representing Spain
| 2001 | Universiade | Beijing, China | 4th | Decathlon | 7949 pts |
| 2002 | European Indoor Championships | Vienna, Austria | 7th | Heptathlon | 5873 pts |
| 2003 | Universiade | Daegu, South Korea | 6th | Decathlon | 7755 pts |
| 2004 | Ibero-American Championships | Huelva, Spain | 3rd | Decathlon | 7560 pts |
| 2005 | Mediterranean Games | Almería, Spain | 4th | Decathlon | 7831 pts |
| 2005 | World Championships | Helsinki, Finland | 16th | Decathlon | 7526 pts |
| 2006 | Ibero-American Championships | Ponce, Puerto Rico | 1st | Decathlon | 7498 pts |
| 2006 | European Championships | Gothenburg, Sweden | 18th | Decathlon | 7491 pts |
