= Charlotte Moore (runner) =

British runner

Personal information
- Born: 4 January 1985 (age 41) Bournemouth, Dorset, England
- Years active: 2001–2008

Sport
- Sport: Athletics
- Event: 800 metres

Achievements and titles
- Commonwealth finals: 2002
- Personal best: 1:59.75

Charlotte Moore (born 4 January 1985) is a runner who competed for England in the 800 metres at the 2002 Commonwealth Games in Manchester.

== Career ==
Moore attended Bournemouth School for Girls and was a member of Bournemouth Athletics Club. In 2001, she competed in the European Youth Summer Olympics, where she sustained an ankle injury in the final. Later in the year, she competed at a Great Britain vs USA junior international event.

Aged 17, Moore competed for England in the 800 metres at the 2002 Commonwealth Games, after coming third in the trials for the event. In her semi-final, she set an English under-20 record time of 2:00.95, which was five seconds quicker than her season's best performance. In the final, Moore became the first English junior to run the 800 metres in under 2 minutes. She finished sixth in a time of 1:59.75. She competed in the 800 metres at the 2003 World Championships in Athletics.

After two years away from sport with an injury, Moore won the 2008 Swanage half-marathon.
