= Angélica Sánchez =

Mexican long-distance runner

Personal information
- Born: December 11, 1975 (age 50) Tlaxcala City, Mexico
Medal record
Women's Athletics
Representing Mexico
CAC Championships
| Silver medal – second place | 2005 Nassau | 5,000 metres |
| Bronze medal – third place | 2005 Nassau | 10,000 metres |

Angélica Sánchez Cautelán (born December 11, 1975) is a female long-distance runner from Mexico. She represented her native country at the 2004 Summer Olympics in Athens, Greece, where she finished in 46th place in the women's marathon event, clocking 2:49.04. Sánchez set her personal best (2:31.12) in the marathon on November 30, 2003, in Milan.

== Achievements ==
| Year | Competition | Venue | Position | Event | Notes |
Representing Mexico
| 2002 | Central American and Caribbean Games | San Salvador, El Salvador | 4th | 1500m | 4:35.33 |
| 2003 | Pan American Games | Santo Domingo, Dominican Republic | 7th | Marathon | 2:53:56 |
| 2004 | Olympic Games | Athens, Greece | 46th | Marathon | 2:49:04 |
| 2005 | Central American and Caribbean Championships | Nassau, Bahamas | 5th | 1500 m | 5:00.44 |
| 2005 | Central American and Caribbean Championships | Nassau, Bahamas | 2nd | 5000 m | 17:15.00 |
| 2005 | Central American and Caribbean Championships | Nassau, Bahamas | 3rd | 10,000 m | 36:36.79 |
| 2006 | Ibero-American Championships | Ponce, Puerto Rico | 3rd | 1500 m | 4:25.73 |
| 2006 | Ibero-American Championships | Ponce, Puerto Rico | 4th | 3000 m s'chase | 10:43.07 |
| 2006 | Central American and Caribbean Games | Cartagena, Colombia | 8th | 1500 m | 4:40.16 |
| 2007 | World Championships | Osaka, Japan | – | Marathon | DNF |
