= Michelle Ballentine =

Jamaican middle-distance runner

Michelle Ballentine (born 31 August 1975, in Saint Catherine Parish) is a retired Jamaican athlete who specialised in the 800 metres. She represented her country at the 2004 Summer Olympics reaching the semifinals.

Ballentine competed for the George Mason Patriots track and field team in the 1990s.

She has personal bests of 1:59.92 outdoors and 2:03.77 indoors, both set in 2004.

== Competition record ==
Year	Competition	Venue	Position	Event	Notes
Representing Jamaica
1994	Central American and Caribbean Junior Championships	Port of Spain, Trinidad and Tobago	1st	800 m	2:08.5
1994	World Junior Championships	Lisbon, Portugal	28th (h)	800m	2:10.65
1994	World Junior Championships	Lisbon, Portugal	9th (h)	4 × 400 m relay	3:39.58
1997	Central American and Caribbean Championships	San Juan, Puerto Rico	2nd	4 × 400 m relay	3:32.28
2001	Central American and Caribbean Championships	Guatemala City, Guatemala	2nd	800 m	2:02.11
2002	Commonwealth Games	Manchester, United Kingdom	8th	800 m	2:03.75
2004	World Indoor Championships	Budapest, Hungary	20th (h)	800 m	2:05.94
2004	World Indoor Championships	Budapest, Hungary	5th	4 × 400 m	3:33.77
2004	Olympic Games	Athens, Greece	20th (sf)	800 m	2:00.94
2005	World Championships	Helsinki, Finland	23rd (sf)	800 m	2:03.98
