= Carlos Ávila =

Honduran long-distance runner (1951–2024)

Personal information
- Full name: Carlos Arturo Ávila Raudales
- Nationality: Honduran
- Born: 15 September 1951
- Died: 9 September 2024 (aged 72)

Sport
- Sport: Long-distance running
- Event: Marathon

Carlos Arturo Ávila Raudales (15 September 1951 – 9 September 2024) was a Honduran long-distance runner. He started his career in the 1960s and later competed for Honduras at the 1984 Summer Olympics. There, he competed in the men's marathon and placed 71st. After his sporting career, he became a teacher at a high school and a coach for the Honduran National Athletics Federation.

== Biography ==
Carlos Arturo Ávila Raudales was born on 15 September 1951. As an athlete, he competed for Honduras in international competition. He started competing during the 1960s and was stated to have a long career by Olympedia.

Ávila was selected to compete for Honduras at the 1984 Summer Olympics held in Los Angeles, United States. At the 1984 Summer Games, he was entered to compete in one event, the men's marathon, his favourite event. At the time, he had a height of 168 centimetres (5.51 ft) and a weight of 58 kilograms (128 lb). Ávila competed in the finals of the men's marathon on 12 August 1984. He competed against 106 other competitors. There, he recorded a time of 2:42:03 and placed 71st out of the 78 competitors that completed the race. Although he did not earn a medal, he set a new personal best in the distance.

After his sporting career, he became a teacher at Jesús Milla Selva High School located in the Colonia John F. Kennedy of Tegucigalpa. He also worked for the Honduran National Athletics Federation as a coach. After being in poor health for his later years, he died on 9 September 2024 at the age of 72.
