= Nallely Vela =

Mexican sprinter

Personal information
- Full name: Nallely Vela Rascón
- Nationality: Mexico
- Born: 8 February 1986 (age 40) Veracruz, Veracruz, Mexico
- Height: 1.66 m (5 ft 5 1/2 in)
- Weight: 49 kg (108 lb)

Sport
- Sport: Athletics
- Event: 4 × 400 metres relay

Achievements and titles
- Personal best: 400 m: 52.65 s (2008)
Medal record
Women's athletics
Representing Mexico
Ibero-American Championships
Gold medal – first place	2006 Ponce	4×400 m relay
Gold medal – first place	2008 Iquique	4×400 m relay
Silver medal – second place	2010 San Fernando	4×400 m relay

Nallely Vela Rascón (born February 8, 1986, in Veracruz, Veracruz) is a Mexican sprinter, who specialized in the 400 metres. She won a total of three medals (two golds and one silver), as a member of the Mexican relay team, at the Ibero-American Championships (2006 in Ponce, Puerto Rico, 2008 in Iquique, Chile, and 2010 in San Fernando, Cádiz, Spain).

Vela competed for the women's 4 × 400 m relay at the 2008 Summer Olympics in Beijing, along with her teammates Zudikey Rodríguez, Gabriela Medina, and Ruth Grajeda. Running the third leg, Vela recorded her individual-split time of 53.01 seconds, and the Mexican team went on to finish the second heat in seventh place, for a total time of 3:30.36.
