= Antonio Domingos =

Portuguese-American pianist (born 1977)

Domingos-Antonio Gomes, better known by his stage name Antonio Domingos (born 1977), also known as Domingos Gomes, Antonio Gomes, Domingos António, and Domingos-António, is a Portuguese-American pianist.

== Early life ==
He began his musical studies at the age of 7 in his native city of Pittsburgh, Pennsylvania, USA. At the age of 14, to further his musical education, he traveled to Moscow, Russia, where he was admitted to the Moscow Academic Music College, a high-school-level affiliate of the Moscow State Conservatory. He graduated from there in 1995, known as 'Antonio Gomes'. In 1996, he entered the Moscow State Conservatory, from which he graduated in 2001 with the highest classification, pursuing a degree in piano performance under the tutelage of Professor D. Sakharov.

In 1995, he was awarded third prize at the first international Vladimir Horowitz Competition for Young Pianists in Kyiv, Ukraine.

In 2002, he settled in Portugal, where he adopted the stage name 'Domingos António' and was active as a concert artist over the course of several years.

In 2010, he performed a concert in Braga, Portugal, dedicated to the bicentennial of the births of Frédéric Chopin, Robert Schumann, and Franz Liszt.

In 2016, having adopted a new stage name, "Antonio Domingos", he created a YouTube channel titled 'extremepianochannel', on which videos of his playing can be seen.

In June 2017, he became the official Guinness World Record holder for the category "Most Piano Key Hits in a Minute" (on one key).
