= Ruth Grajeda =

Mexican sprinter (born 1980)

Personal information
- Full name: Ruth del Carmen Grajeda; González
- Nationality: Mexico
- Born: 31 July 1980 (age 46) Ciudad Cuauhtémoc, Chihuahua, Mexico
- Height: 1.67 m (5 ft 5 1/2 in)
- Weight: 55 kg (121 lb)

Sport
- Sport: Athletics
- Event: 4 × 400 metres relay
Medal record
Women's athletics
Representing Mexico
Ibero-American Championships
Gold medal – first place	2006 Ponce	4×400 m relay
Gold medal – first place	2008 Iquique	4×400 m relay

Ruth del Carmen Grajeda González (born 31 July 1980 in Ciudad Cuauhtémoc, Chihuahua) is a Mexican sprinter, who specialized in the 400 metres. She won two gold medals, as a member of the Mexican relay team, at the 2006 Ibero-American Championships in Ponce, Puerto Rico, and at the 2008 Ibero-American Championships in Iquique, Chile.

Grajeda competed for the women's 4 × 400 m relay at the 2008 Summer Olympics in Beijing, along with her teammates Zudikey Rodríguez, Gabriela Medina, and Nallely Vela. Running the start-off leg, Grajeda recorded her individual-split time of 54.71 seconds, and the Mexican team went on to finish the second heat in seventh place, for a total time of 3:30.36.

== Achievements ==
Year	Competition	Venue	Position	Event	Notes
Representing Mexico
2002	NACAC U-25 Championships	San Antonio, Texas, United States	6th	100m	12.22 (wind: +0.3 m/s)
2002	NACAC U-25 Championships	San Antonio, Texas, United States	5th	200m	24.82 (wind: -0.3 m/s)
2002	Central American and Caribbean Games	San Salvador, El Salvador	5th	100m	11.95 w (wind: 2.3 m/s)
