= Maritza Salas =

Maritza Salas Kelly (born January 3, 1975) is a retired female track and field athlete, who competed in the sprints events during her career. She represented her native country, Puerto Rico, at the 2000 Summer Olympics, where she was eliminated in the first round of the women's 4x400 metres relay competition, alongside Militza Castro, Sandra Moya and Beatriz Cruz. Salas ran the fourth and last leg in the heat 2 race. She is the only daughter of Raul Salas and Vinetta Kelly.
