= Juan Sainfleur =

Dominican Republic sprinter

Personal information
- Born: February 17, 1982 (age 44) La Romana, Dominican Republic

Sport
- Sport: Track and field
Medal record
Representing Dominican Republic
Central American and Caribbean Games
Gold medal – first place	2006 Cartagena	4x100m relay

Juan Luis Sainfleur Hernández (born February 17, 1982) is a sprinter from the Dominican Republic specializing in the 100 metres.

He won a bronze medal at the 2004 Ibero-American Championships. Participating in the 2004 Summer Olympics, he failed to finish in his 100 metre heat, thus failing to make it through to the second round. He also participated at the 2005 World Championships, exiting in the quarter-finals.

He finished fifth at the 2006 Central American and Caribbean Games.

His personal best time is 10.22 seconds, achieved in May 2004 in Santo Domingo.

== Achievements ==
Year	Competition	Venue	Position	Event	Notes
Representing the Dominican Republic
2002	NACAC U-25 Championships	San Antonio, Texas, United States	5th (h)	200m	21.56 (wind: +1.6 m/s)
2002	Central American and Caribbean Games	San Salvador, El Salvador	5th	100m	10.47 w (wind: 2.1 m/s)
2002	Central American and Caribbean Games	San Salvador, El Salvador	1st	4 × 100 m relay	39.41
2004	South American U23 Championships	Barquisimeto, Venezuela	2nd	4 × 100 m relay	39.84
2004	NACAC U-23 Championships	Sherbrooke, Canada	5th	4 × 100 m relay	41.30
2004	NACAC U-23 Championships	Sherbrooke, Canada	5th	4 × 400 m relay	3:18.00
