= Mayra González (athlete) =

Mexican sprinter

Personal information
- Full name: Mayra Marcela González Maldonado
- Born: 24 November 1973 (age 52) Jalisco, Mexico

Sport
- Sport: Sprinting
- Event: 4 × 400 metres relay
Medal record
Representing Mexico
Central American and Caribbean Games
Gold medal – first place	2006 Cartagena	4x400m relay

Mayra Marcela González Maldonado (born 24 November 1973) is a Mexican sprinter. She competed in the women's 4 × 400 metres relay at the 2004 Summer Olympics.
