= 2000 NACAC Under-25 Championships in Athletics – Results =

These are the full results of the 2000 NACAC Under-25 Championships in Athletics which took place between August 3 and August 5, 2000, at Universidad Autónoma de Nuevo León in Monterrey, Mexico.

== Men's results ==
=== 100 meters ===
Final – 3 August
Wind: -2.5 m/s

Rank	Name	Nationality	Time	Notes
1st place, gold medalist(s)	Kim Collins	Saint Kitts and Nevis	10.46	
2nd place, silver medalist(s)	Nicolas Macrozonaris	Canada	10.75	
3rd place, bronze medalist(s)	Dion Crabbe	British Virgin Islands	10.82	
4	Rogelio Pizarro	Puerto Rico	11.04	
5	Ebener Dueñas	Mexico	11.06	
6	Russell Brooks	Canada	11.07	
7	Everton Evelyn	Barbados	11.14	
8	Errol Thurton	Belize	11.34	

Heat 1
– 3 August
Wind: -0.5 m/s

Rank	Name	Nationality	Time	Notes
1	Dion Crabbe	British Virgin Islands	10.72	Q
2	Everton Evelyn	Barbados	10.90	Q
3	Ebener Dueñas	Mexico	10.92	Q
4	Russell Brooks	Canada	10.93	q
5	Félix Omar Fernández	Puerto Rico	10.96	
6	Jayson Jones	Belize	10.98	
	Dwight Thomas	Jamaica	DNF	

Heat 2
– 3 August
Wind: -0.9 m/s

Rank	Name	Nationality	Time	Notes
1	Kim Collins	Saint Kitts and Nevis	10.50	Q
2	Nicolas Macrozonaris	Canada	10.59	Q
3	Rogelio Pizarro	Puerto Rico	10.78	Q
4	Errol Thurton	Belize	10.94	q
5	Jorge Ramirez Plazola	Mexico	11.02	
6	James Sherwin	Dominica	11.03	
7	Tacey Harper	Trinidad and Tobago	11.20	

=== 200 meters ===
Final – 5 August
Wind: -3.9 m/s

Rank	Name	Nationality	Time	Notes
1st place, gold medalist(s)	Kim Collins	Saint Kitts and Nevis	20.53	
2nd place, silver medalist(s)	Dominic Demeritte	Bahamas	20.85	
3rd place, bronze medalist(s)	Dion Crabbe	British Virgin Islands	21.27	
4	Jairo Duzant	Netherlands Antilles	21.59	
5	Russell Brooks	Canada	21.87	
6	Rubén Chávez	Mexico	21.91	
7	Osvaldo Nieves	Puerto Rico	22.13	
8	Steve Augustine	British Virgin Islands	22.18	

Heat 1
– 4 August
Wind: +0.9 m/s

Rank	Name	Nationality	Time	Notes
1	Kim Collins	Saint Kitts and Nevis	21.42	Q
2	Dion Crabbe	British Virgin Islands	21.43	Q
3	Jairo Duzant	Netherlands Antilles	21.61	Q
4	James Sherwin	Dominica	21.97	
5	Jayson Jones	Belize	22.16	
6	Javier Gijón	Mexico	22.34	

Heat 2
– 4 August
Wind: +0.7 m/s

Rank	Name	Nationality	Time	Notes
1	Dominic Demeritte	Bahamas	21.55	Q
2	Russell Brooks	Canada	21.85	Q
3	Rubén Chávez	Mexico	21.88	Q
4	Steve Augustine	British Virgin Islands	21.92	q
5	Osvaldo Nieves	Puerto Rico	21.94	q

=== 400 meters ===
Final – 4 August

Rank	Name	Nationality	Time	Notes
1st place, gold medalist(s)	Fabian Rollins	Barbados	46.01	
2nd place, silver medalist(s)	Christopher Brown	Bahamas	46.02	
3rd place, bronze medalist(s)	David Coombs	Jamaica	46.86	
4	Wilan Louis	Barbados	47.53	
5	Jesús Torres	Puerto Rico	47.96	
6	Khalid Brooks	Anguilla	54.58	

=== 800 meters ===
Final – 5 August

Rank	Name	Nationality	Time	Notes
1st place, gold medalist(s)	Milton Browne	Barbados	1:51.02	
2nd place, silver medalist(s)	Martin Cluff	Canada	1:51.20	
3rd place, bronze medalist(s)	Heleodoro Navarro	Mexico	1:52.12	
4	Rodolfo Gómez	Mexico	1:52.43	
5	Nickie Peters	Saint Vincent and the Grenadines	1:54.26	
6	Juan Pablo Tutila	El Salvador	1:58.52	

=== 1500 meters ===
Final – 3 August

Rank	Name	Nationality	Time	Notes
1st place, gold medalist(s)	Jonathon Riley	United States	3:45.48	
2nd place, silver medalist(s)	Alejandro Suárez	Mexico	3:48.09	
3rd place, bronze medalist(s)	Luis Manuel Arias	Mexico	3:49.79	
4	Andy Powell	United States	3:49.79	
5	Heleodoro Navarro	Mexico	3:55.05	
6	Carlos Augusto Allen	Guatemala	3:56.54	
7	Nickie Peters	Saint Vincent and the Grenadines	4:07.92	

=== 5000 meters ===
Final – 5 August

Rank	Name	Nationality	Time	Notes
1st place, gold medalist(s)	Alejandro Suárez	Mexico	14:11.48	
2nd place, silver medalist(s)	Jason Balkman	United States	14:16.44	
3rd place, bronze medalist(s)	Nathan Nutter	United States	14:26.25	
4	Omar Chavarría	Mexico	14:42.52	
	Peter Watson	Canada	DNF	

=== 10,000 meters ===
Final – 3 August

Rank	Name	Nationality	Time	Notes
1st place, gold medalist(s)	David Galindo	Mexico	31:03.25	
2nd place, silver medalist(s)	Jonathan Morales	Mexico	31:48.66	
3rd place, bronze medalist(s)	Sergio de León	Guatemala	32:05.08	

=== Half marathon ===
Final – 5 August

Rank	Name	Nationality	Time	Notes
1st place, gold medalist(s)	Hugo Romero	Mexico	1:08:58.66	
2nd place, silver medalist(s)	Ariel Aguirre	Mexico	1:09:35.62	
3rd place, bronze medalist(s)	Francisco Mondragón	Mexico	1:10:14.65	

=== 3000 meters steeplechase ===
Final – 4 August

Rank	Name	Nationality	Time	Notes
1st place, gold medalist(s)	Tom Chorny	United States	8:47.98	
2nd place, silver medalist(s)	Chuck Sloan	United States	8:48.60	
3rd place, bronze medalist(s)	Alexander Greaux	Puerto Rico	9:00.61	
4	Dennys Salgado	Mexico	9:14.59	
5	Erick Arenas	Mexico	9:19.19	
6	Fredy Velásquez	Guatemala	9:22.48	

=== 110 meters hurdles ===
Final – 5 August
Wind: -1.9 m/s

Rank	Name	Nationality	Time	Notes
1st place, gold medalist(s)	Aubrey Herring	United States	13.96	
2nd place, silver medalist(s)	Andrew Lissade	Canada	13.98	
3rd place, bronze medalist(s)	Randy Gillon	Antigua and Barbuda	14.33	
4	Hugh Henry	Barbados	14.46	
5	Ryan Clarke	Jamaica	14.91	
6	Roberto Castrejón	Mexico	14.96	
7	Roberto Carbajal	Mexico	15.29	

=== 400 meters hurdles ===
Final – 3 August

Rank	Name	Nationality	Time	Notes
1st place, gold medalist(s)	Nick Stewart	Canada	50.06	
2nd place, silver medalist(s)	Jeff Ellis	Canada	50.76	
3rd place, bronze medalist(s)	Ryan Clarke	Jamaica	50.94	
4	Kurt Duncan	Jamaica	51.04	
5	Ryan King	Barbados	51.16	
6	Steve Augustine	British Virgin Islands	51.41	
7	Ednol Rolle	Bahamas	51.42	
8	Ricky Harris	United States	51.45	

Heat 1
– 3 August

Rank	Name	Nationality	Time	Notes
1	Ricky Harris	United States	51.04	Q
2	Jeff Ellis	Canada	51.35	Q
3	Ednol Rolle	Bahamas	52.10	Q
3	Kurt Duncan	Jamaica	52.10	q

Heat 2
– 3 August

Rank	Name	Nationality	Time	Notes
1	Ryan Clarke	Jamaica	51.28	Q
2	Ryan King	Barbados	51.39	Q
3	Nick Stewart	Canada	52.05	Q
4	Steve Augustine	British Virgin Islands	52.19	q
5	Israel Benítez	Mexico	53.16	

=== High jump ===
Final – 5 August

Rank	Name	Nationality	Result	Notes
1st place, gold medalist(s)	Jesse Lipscombe	Canada	2.20m	
2nd place, silver medalist(s)	Jeremy Fischer	United States	2.15m	
3rd place, bronze medalist(s)	Damon Thompson	Barbados	2.05m	
4	Osmand Stanley	Mexico	2.00m	

=== Pole vault ===
Final – 5 August

Rank	Name	Nationality	Result	Notes
1st place, gold medalist(s)	Russ Buller	United States	5.40m	
2nd place, silver medalist(s)	Robinson Pratt	Mexico	5.20m	
	Jacob Pauli	United States	NH	

=== Long jump ===
Final – 4 August

Rank	Name	Nationality	Result	Notes
1st place, gold medalist(s)	Miguel Pate	United States	7.68m (+0.4 m/s)	
2nd place, silver medalist(s)	Aundre Edwards	Jamaica	7.53m (+1.6 m/s)	
3rd place, bronze medalist(s)	Cleavon Dillon	Trinidad and Tobago	7.45m (+1.7 m/s)	
4	James Sherwin	Dominica	7.34m w (+3.7 m/s)	
5	Kevin Bartlett	Barbados	7.18m w (+2.3 m/s)	
6	Abel Orozco	Mexico	7.15m (+1.3 m/s)	
7	Iván Soberanis	Mexico	6.65m (+0.0 m/s)	

=== Triple jump ===
Final – 3 August

Rank	Name	Nationality	Result	Notes
1st place, gold medalist(s)	Allan Mortimer	Bahamas	15.74m w (+3.2 m/s)	
2nd place, silver medalist(s)	Gregory Hughes	Barbados	15.48m (+1.8 m/s)	
3rd place, bronze medalist(s)	Gerardo Martínez	Mexico	15.43m w (+3.7 m/s)	
4	José Santos	Mexico	14.97m w (+3.6 m/s)	

=== Shot put ===
Final – 3 August

Rank	Name	Nationality	Result	Notes
1st place, gold medalist(s)	John Davis	United States	19.50m	
2nd place, silver medalist(s)	Jarred Rome	United States	19.50m	
3rd place, bronze medalist(s)	Dave Stoute	Trinidad and Tobago	18.91m	
4	Paulino Ríos	Mexico	15.40m	
5	Daniel Chapa	Mexico	14.91m	

=== Discus throw ===
Final – 4 August

Rank	Name	Nationality	Result	Notes
1st place, gold medalist(s)	Casey Malone	United States	59.19m	
2nd place, silver medalist(s)	Jarred Rome	United States	58.08m	
3rd place, bronze medalist(s)	Juan Manuel Martínez	Mexico	41.19m	
4	Alan Moroyoqui	Mexico	39.95m	
5	Raúl Alexander Rivera	Guatemala	39.19m	

=== Hammer throw ===
Final – 5 August

Rank	Name	Nationality	Result	Notes
1st place, gold medalist(s)	Kevin Mannon	United States	67.72m	
2nd place, silver medalist(s)	Raúl Alexander Rivera	Guatemala	59.57m	
3rd place, bronze medalist(s)	Carlos Valencia	Mexico	57.27m	
4	Héctor Ponce de Leon	Mexico	53.12m	
5	Miguel Sarquiz	Mexico	50.93m	

=== Javelin throw ===
Final – 3 August

Rank	Name	Nationality	Result	Notes
1st place, gold medalist(s)	Brian Kollar	United States	71.51m	
2nd place, silver medalist(s)	Javier Ugarte	Nicaragua	61.58m	
3rd place, bronze medalist(s)	Gustavo Siller	Mexico	59.05m	
4	Javier Alonso López	Mexico	57.90m	

=== Decathlon ===
Final – 3 August

Rank	Name	Nationality	Points	Notes
1st place, gold medalist(s)	Maurice Smith	Jamaica	7090	
2nd place, silver medalist(s)	Juan Enrique Tenorio	Mexico	5853	
3rd place, bronze medalist(s)	Alejandro Escalona	Mexico	5778	

=== 20,000 meters walk ===
Final – 4 August

Rank	Name	Nationality	Time	Notes
1st place, gold medalist(s)	Edgar Hernández	Mexico	1:25:36.67	
2nd place, silver medalist(s)	Jesús Sánchez	Mexico	1:29:30.64	
3rd place, bronze medalist(s)	John Nunn	United States	1:45:37.35	

=== 4×100 meters relay ===
Final – 4 August

Rank	Nation	Competitors	Time	Notes
1st place, gold medalist(s)	Puerto Rico		40.45	
	Mexico		DQ	
	Canada		DQ	

=== 4×400 meters relay ===
Final – 5 August

Rank	Nation	Competitors	Time	Notes
1st place, gold medalist(s)	Barbados		3:10.76	
2nd place, silver medalist(s)	Mexico	Israel Benítez; Roberto Carbajal; Roberto Castrejón; Ebener Dueñas	3:13.66	
3rd place, bronze medalist(s)	Canada		3:25.33	

== Women's results ==
=== 100 meters ===
Final – 3 August
Wind: -1.6 m/s

Rank	Name	Nationality	Time	Notes
1st place, gold medalist(s)	Angela Williams	United States	11.57	
2nd place, silver medalist(s)	Aleen Bailey	Jamaica	11.66	
3rd place, bronze medalist(s)	Cydonie Mothersill	Cayman Islands	11.83	
4	Yessica Torres	Mexico	11.94	
5	Krysha Bayley	Canada	12.19	
6	Violeta González	Mexico	12.69	
7	Irma Navarrete	Nicaragua	13.12	

=== 200 meters ===
Final – 5 August
Wind: -3.1 m/s

Rank	Name	Nationality	Time	Notes
1st place, gold medalist(s)	Aleen Bailey	Jamaica	23.47	
2nd place, silver medalist(s)	Cydonie Mothersill	Cayman Islands	23.72	
3rd place, bronze medalist(s)	Christine Amertil	Bahamas	24.05	
4	Melissa Straker	Barbados	24.26	
5	Yessica Torres	Mexico	24.70	
6	Adwoa Gyasi	Canada	24.87	
7	Tanya Oxley	Barbados	25.41	
8	Irma Navarrete	Nicaragua	26.73	

=== 400 meters ===
Final – 4 August

Rank	Name	Nationality	Time	Notes
1st place, gold medalist(s)	Christine Amertil	Bahamas	52.65	
2nd place, silver medalist(s)	Tanya Oxley	Barbados	52.92	
3rd place, bronze medalist(s)	Tonique Williams	Bahamas	53.05	
4	Sherline Williams	Barbados	53.22	
5	Adia McKinnor	Trinidad and Tobago	53.72	
6	Samantha George	Canada	54.12	
7	Gabriela Medina	Mexico	57.33	
8	Irma Navarrete	Nicaragua	59.67	

=== 800 meters ===
Final – 5 August

Rank	Name	Nationality	Time	Notes
1st place, gold medalist(s)	Elizabeth Diaz	United States	2:03.59	
2nd place, silver medalist(s)	Ashley Wysong	United States	2:04.92	
3rd place, bronze medalist(s)	Sheena Gooding	Barbados	2:12.92	
4	Ana Lucía Hurtado	Guatemala	2:19.74	

=== 1500 meters ===
Final – 3 August

Rank	Name	Nationality	Time	Notes
1st place, gold medalist(s)	Susan Taylor	United States	4:20.31	
2nd place, silver medalist(s)	Margarita Tapia	Mexico	4:27.45	
3rd place, bronze medalist(s)	Janill Williams	Antigua and Barbuda	4:32.34	
4	Madaí Pérez	Mexico	4:35.67	

=== 5000 meters ===
Final – 5 August

Rank	Name	Nationality	Time	Notes
1st place, gold medalist(s)	Margarita Tapia	Mexico	16:51.57	
2nd place, silver medalist(s)	Janill Williams	Antigua and Barbuda	18:16.78	
3rd place, bronze medalist(s)	Guadalupe García	Mexico	18:38.48	

=== 10,000 meters ===
Final – 4 August

Rank	Name	Nationality	Time	Notes
1st place, gold medalist(s)	Guadalupe García	Mexico	38:59.43	
2nd place, silver medalist(s)	Kary Tripp	Mexico	39:01.36	

=== Half marathon ===
Final – 5 August

Rank	Name	Nationality	Time	Notes
1st place, gold medalist(s)	Madaí Pérez	Mexico	1:25:01.04	

=== 100 meters hurdles ===
Final – 4 August
Wind: -1.8 m/s

Rank	Name	Nationality	Time	Notes
1st place, gold medalist(s)	Jenny Adams	United States	13.54	
2nd place, silver medalist(s)	Dalanda Jackson	United States	13.87	
3rd place, bronze medalist(s)	Angela Whyte	Canada	14.14	
4	Keitha Mosley	Barbados	14.40	
5	Astrid Stoopen	Mexico	14.55	
6	Beatriz Tejeda	Mexico	15.12	

=== 400 meters hurdles ===
Final – 3 August

Rank	Name	Nationality	Time	Notes
1st place, gold medalist(s)	Tawa Babatunde	Canada	57.99	
2nd place, silver medalist(s)	Deniece Bell	Canada	58.30	
3rd place, bronze medalist(s)	Sheena Johnson	United States	59.81	

=== High jump ===
Final – 4 August

Rank	Name	Nationality	Result	Notes
1st place, gold medalist(s)	Celly Martínez	Mexico	1.75m	
2nd place, silver medalist(s)	Yunuen Alejandri	Mexico	1.60m	

=== Pole vault ===
Final – 3 August

Rank	Name	Nationality	Result	Notes
1st place, gold medalist(s)	Tracey O'Hara	United States	4.00m	
2nd place, silver medalist(s)	Dana Ellis	Canada	3.80m	
3rd place, bronze medalist(s)	Kristin Hagel	Canada	3.70m	
4	Alejandra Meza	Mexico	3.40m	
	Jéssica Piñon	Mexico	NH	
	Kathleen Donoghue	United States	NH	

=== Long jump ===
Final – 5 August

Rank	Name	Nationality	Result	Notes
1st place, gold medalist(s)	Jenny Adams	United States	6.34m (+2.0 m/s)	
2nd place, silver medalist(s)	Tisha Parker	United States	6.32m w (+5.5 m/s)	
3rd place, bronze medalist(s)	Ayesha Maycock	Barbados	6.15m w (+4.0 m/s)	
4	Gabrielle Deshong	Canada	6.08m (+1.1 m/s)	
5	Krysha Bayley	Canada	5.86m w (+3.1 m/s)	
6	Gabriela Martínez	Mexico	5.34m (+1.7 m/s)	

=== Triple jump ===
Final – 4 August

Rank	Name	Nationality	Result	Notes
1st place, gold medalist(s)	Nicole Gamble	United States	13.27m (-0.7 m/s)	
2nd place, silver medalist(s)	Dahlia Ingram	United States	12.72m (-0.3 m/s)	
3rd place, bronze medalist(s)	Mónica Martínez	Mexico	11.98m (-0.1 m/s)	
4	Christian Atala	Mexico	11.44m (-0.9 m/s)	

=== Shot put ===
Final – 5 August

Rank	Name	Nationality	Result	Notes
1st place, gold medalist(s)	Tina MacDonald	Canada	16.07m	
2nd place, silver medalist(s)	Marie Josée LeJour	Canada	14.83m	
3rd place, bronze medalist(s)	Melissa Gibbon	Jamaica	14.76m	
4	Doris Thompson	Bahamas	13.32m	
5	María de los Ángeles Sánchez	Mexico	11.94m	
6	Mariana Vargas	Mexico	11.88m	

=== Discus throw ===
Final – 3 August

Rank	Name	Nationality	Result	Notes
1st place, gold medalist(s)	Tina MacDonald	Canada	49.23m	
2nd place, silver medalist(s)	Melissa Gibbon	Jamaica	48.99m	
3rd place, bronze medalist(s)	Marie Josée LeJour	Canada	46.41m	
4	Ana Lucía Espinosa	Guatemala	45.67m	
5	Doris Thompson	Bahamas	41.65m	
6	Jenny Hinojosa	Mexico	41.61m	
7	Flor Acosta	Mexico	40.76m	
8	Tamara Popo	Saint Lucia	32.63m	

=== Hammer throw ===
Final – 3 August

Rank	Name	Nationality	Result	Notes
1st place, gold medalist(s)	Melissa Price	United States	61.83m	
2nd place, silver medalist(s)	Mauren Griffin	United States	60.47m	
3rd place, bronze medalist(s)	Violeta Guzmán	Mexico	58.84m	
4	Nancy Guillén	El Salvador	58.19m	
5	Marie Josée LeJour	Canada	53.68m	
6	Nathalie Thénor	Canada	53.59m	
7	Jéssica Ponce de León	Mexico	50.84m	
8	Ana Lucía Espinosa	Guatemala	48.88m	

=== Javelin throw ===
Final – 5 August

Rank	Name	Nationality	Result	Notes
1st place, gold medalist(s)	Kendra Wecker	United States	53.18m	
2nd place, silver medalist(s)	Ana Érika Gutiérrez	Mexico	47.28m	

=== Heptathlon ===
Final – 4 August

Rank	Name	Nationality	Points	Notes
1st place, gold medalist(s)	Tracye Lawyer	United States	5557	
2nd place, silver medalist(s)	Christi Smith	United States	5180	
3rd place, bronze medalist(s)	Rocío González	Mexico	4065	
4	Lauren Maul	Barbados	3846	

=== 20,000 meters walk ===
Final – 4 August

Rank	Name	Nationality	Time	Notes
1st place, gold medalist(s)	Victoria Palacios	Mexico	1:39:01.14	
2nd place, silver medalist(s)	Sarah Stevenson	United States	1:39:54.03	
3rd place, bronze medalist(s)	Abigail Sáenz	Mexico	1:44:50.42	

=== 4×100 meters relay ===
Final – 4 August

Rank	Nation	Competitors	Time	Notes
1st place, gold medalist(s)	Canada		46.37	
	Mexico		DQ	

=== 4×400 meters relay ===
Final – 5 August

Rank	Nation	Competitors	Time	Notes
1st place, gold medalist(s)	Barbados		3:36.58	
2nd place, silver medalist(s)	Canada		3:37.90	
3rd place, bronze medalist(s)	Mexico	Yuridia Bustamante; Claudia Miranda; Gabriela Medina; Yessica Torres	3:49.83	
