= 2002 Ibero-American Championships in Athletics – Results =

These are the results of the 2002 Ibero-American Championships in Athletics which took place on May 11–12, 2002 on Estadio Cementos Progreso in Guatemala City, Guatemala. As the stadium is located 1402 meters above sea level, performances in some of the events were aided by high altitude.

== Men's results ==
=== 100 meters ===
Heats – May 11
Wind:
Heat 1: +2.6 m/s, Heat 2: +2.0 m/s, Heat 3: +1.9 m/s

Rank	Heat	Name	Nationality	Time	Notes
1	1	Vicente de Lima	Brazil	10.22	Q
2	2	Jesús Carrión	Puerto Rico	10.28	Q
3	2	Heber Viera	Uruguay	10.29	Q
4	1	John Jairo Córdoba	Colombia	10.31	Q
4	2	Édson Ribeiro	Brazil	10.31	q
6	1	Luis Morán	Ecuador	10.38	q
7	1	Gabriel Simón	Argentina	10.45	
8	1	Rubén Techeira	Uruguay	10.47	
9	1	Bob Brown	Costa Rica	10.55	
10	2	Juan Morillo	Venezuela	10.58	
10	3	Sebastián Keitel	Chile	10.58	Q
12	3	Rogelio Pizarro	Puerto Rico	10.59	Q
13	2	Juan Sainfleur	Dominican Republic	10.62	
13	3	Nilson Palacios	Venezuela	10.90	
14	2	Isaí Cruz	Guatemala	11.26	
15	3	Miguel Ángel Flores	Honduras	11.40	

Final – May 11
Wind:
+3.0 m/s

Rank	Name	Nationality	Time	Notes
1st place, gold medalist(s)	Heber Viera	Uruguay	10.08	
2nd place, silver medalist(s)	Vicente de Lima	Brazil	10.08	
3rd place, bronze medalist(s)	Édson Ribeiro	Brazil	10.22	
4	John Jairo Córdoba	Colombia	10.26	
5	Jesús Carrión	Puerto Rico	10.31	
6	Luis Morán	Ecuador	10.33	
7	Sebastián Keitel	Chile	10.43	
8	Rogelio Pizarro	Puerto Rico	10.52	

=== 200 meters ===
Heats – May 12
Wind:
Heat 1: -2.8 m/s, Heat 2: -1.4 m/s, Heat 3: +1.3 m/s

Rank	Heat	Name	Nationality	Time	Notes
1	2	André da Silva	Brazil	20.63	Q
2	2	Heber Viera	Uruguay	20.82	Q
3	3	José Carabalí	Venezuela	21.00	Q
4	3	Osvaldo Nieves	Puerto Rico	21.16	Q
5	2	John Jairo Córdoba	Colombia	21.20	q
5	3	Luis Morán	Ecuador	21.20	q
7	3	Rubén Techeira	Uruguay	21.31	
8	1	Joseph Brown	Costa Rica	21.44	Q
9	3	Juan Sainfleur	Dominican Republic	21.49	
10	1	Fabio Gonçalves Silva	Brazil	21.58	Q
11	2	Jorge Richardson	Puerto Rico	21.77	
12	1	Jonnie Lowe	Honduras	22.25	
13	1	Isaí Cruz	Guatemala	22.77	

Final – May 12
Wind:
+3.0 m/s

Rank	Name	Nationality	Time	Notes
1st place, gold medalist(s)	André da Silva	Brazil	20.22	
2nd place, silver medalist(s)	Heber Viera	Uruguay	20.46	
3rd place, bronze medalist(s)	John Jairo Córdoba	Colombia	20.99	
4	José Carabalí	Venezuela	20.99	
5	Fabio Gonçalves Silva	Brazil	21.14	
6	Joseph Brown	Costa Rica	21.16	
7	Luis Morán	Ecuador	22.32	
	Osvaldo Nieves	Puerto Rico	DNS	

=== 400 meters ===
Heats – May 11

Rank	Heat	Name	Nationality	Time	Notes
1	1	Carlos Santa	Dominican Republic	46.34	Q
2	2	Ricardo Roach	Chile	46.96	Q
3	2	Luis Antônio Eloi	Brazil	47.02	Q
4	1	Jonathan Palma	Venezuela	47.05	Q
5	2	Luis Luna	Venezuela	47.42	Q
6	1	Román Basil	Panama	47.54	Q
7	1	Luis da Silveira	Brazil	47.63	q
8	2	José Peralta	Dominican Republic	47.65	q
9	1	Cristian Gutiérrez	Ecuador	49.84	
10	2	Alex Navas	Honduras	51.40	
11	2	Oscar Vinici	Guatemala	51.40	

Final – May 12

Rank	Name	Nationality	Time	Notes
1st place, gold medalist(s)	Carlos Santa	Dominican Republic	45.69	
2nd place, silver medalist(s)	Jonathan Palma	Venezuela	46.09	
3rd place, bronze medalist(s)	Ricardo Roach	Chile	46.37	
4	Luis Antônio Eloi	Brazil	46.49	
5	Luis da Silveira	Brazil	46.59	
6	José Peralta	Dominican Republic	46.91	
7	Román Basil	Panama	47.21	
8	Luis Luna	Venezuela	47.42	

=== 800 meters ===
May 11

Rank	Name	Nationality	Time	Notes
1st place, gold medalist(s)	Hudson de Souza	Brazil	1:46.74	
2nd place, silver medalist(s)	Osmar dos Santos	Brazil	1:46.81	
3rd place, bronze medalist(s)	Ricardo Etheridge	Puerto Rico	1:47.08	
4	Miguel Quesada	Spain	1:47.10	
5	Sergio Gallardo	Spain	1:47.73	
6	Heliodoro Navarro	Mexico	1:49.05	
7	Manuel González	Venezuela	1:50.76	
8	Cristian Matute	Ecuador	1:50.88	
9	Juan Luis Barrios	Mexico	1:50.98	
10	Kenneth Zamora	Costa Rica	1:52.39	
11	Carlos Allen	Guatemala	1:56.30	

=== 1500 meters ===
May 12

Rank	Name	Nationality	Time	Notes
1st place, gold medalist(s)	Hudson de Souza	Brazil	3:45.46	
2nd place, silver medalist(s)	Manuel Damiao	Portugal	3:47.09	
3rd place, bronze medalist(s)	Javier Carriqueo	Argentina	3:48.73	
4	Rodolfo Gómez	Mexico	3:49.26	
5	Javier Moro	Spain	3:49.86	
6	Juan Luis Barrios	Mexico	3:50.87	
7	Alexander Greaux	Puerto Rico	3:51.27	
8	Bayron Piedra	Ecuador	3:58.01	
9	Jeffrey Fernández	Costa Rica	3:58.53	
10	Carlos Allen	Guatemala	3:58.95	
11	Manuel González	Venezuela	4:01.84	
12	Ricardo Etheridge	Puerto Rico	4:02.71	
13	Luis Martínez	Guatemala	4:03.97	

=== 3000 meters ===
May 12

Rank	Name	Nationality	Time	Notes
1st place, gold medalist(s)	Pablo Villalobos	Spain	8:10.28	
2nd place, silver medalist(s)	Alejandro Suárez	Mexico	8:10.62	
3rd place, bronze medalist(s)	David Galván	Mexico	8:12.18	
4	Ricardo Fernández	Spain	8:18.63	
5	Ramiro Nogueira Filho	Brazil	8:23.25	
6	Francisco Gómez Vega	Costa Rica	8:28.32	
7	Freddy González	Venezuela	8:35.98	

=== 5000 meters ===
May 11

Rank	Name	Nationality	Time	Notes
1st place, gold medalist(s)	Alejandro Suárez	Mexico	14:16.22	
2nd place, silver medalist(s)	Teodoro Vega	Mexico	14:17.18	
3rd place, bronze medalist(s)	Mauricio Díaz	Chile	14:19.92	
4	Francisco Gómez Vega	Costa Rica	14:33.82	
5	Iván Hierro	Spain	14:46.64	
6	Sergi de León	Guatemala	14:51.88	

=== 110 meters hurdles ===
May 12
Wind:
+1.4 m/s

Rank	Name	Nationality	Time	Notes
1st place, gold medalist(s)	Paulo Villar	Colombia	13.57	
2nd place, silver medalist(s)	Matheus Facho Inocencio	Brazil	13.58	
3rd place, bronze medalist(s)	Anselmo da Silva	Brazil	13.66	
4	Sadros Sánchez	Panama	14.06	
5	David Umana	Costa Rica	16.30	

=== 400 meters hurdles ===
May 11

Rank	Name	Nationality	Time	Notes
1st place, gold medalist(s)	Sergio Hierrezuelo	Cuba	50.60	
2nd place, silver medalist(s)	Eronilde de Araújo	Brazil	50.78	
3rd place, bronze medalist(s)	Cleverson da Silva	Brazil	50.88	
4	Andrés Carchi	Ecuador	54.73	
5	Oscar Vinici	Guatemala	56.47	
6	David Umana	Costa Rica	57.94	

=== 3000 meters steeplechase ===
May 12

Rank	Name	Nationality	Time	Notes
1st place, gold medalist(s)	Salvador Miranda	Mexico	8:47.79	
2nd place, silver medalist(s)	José María González	Spain	8:50.72	
3rd place, bronze medalist(s)	Francisco Munuera	Spain	8:59.95	
4	Néstor Nieves	Venezuela	9:08.00	
5	Romualdo Sánchez	Mexico	9:08.17	

=== 4 x 100 meters relay ===
May 11

Rank	Nation	Competitors	Time	Notes
1st place, gold medalist(s)	Brazil	Vicente de Lima, Édson Ribeiro, André da Silva, Fabio Gonçalves Silva	38.58	
2nd place, silver medalist(s)	Puerto Rico	Carlos Santos, Jesús Carrión, Osvaldo Nieves, Rogelio Pizarro	39.47	
3rd place, bronze medalist(s)	Venezuela	Juan Morillo, Ellis Ollarves, José Carabalí, Nilson Palacios	40.15	
4	Honduras	José Calixto Sierra, Miguel Ángel Flores, Alex Navas, Jonnie Lowe	43.92	

=== 4 x 400 meters relay ===
May 12

Rank	Nation	Competitors	Time	Notes
1st place, gold medalist(s)	Brazil	Luis da Silveira, Luis Antônio Eloi, Diego Venâncio, Flávio Godoy	3:05.71	
2nd place, silver medalist(s)	Venezuela	José Carabalí, Danny Núnez, Luis Luna, Jonathan Palma	3:08.87	
3rd place, bronze medalist(s)	Puerto Rico	Jorge Richardson, Ricardo Etheridge, Alexander Greaux, Rogelio Pizarro	3:12.64	
4	Ecuador	Cristián Matute, Andrés Carchi, Luis Morán, Cristián Gutiérrez	3:13.90	
5	Honduras	Miguel Ángel Flores, José Calixto Sierra, Alex Navas, Jonnie Lowe	3:33.11	

=== 20,000 meters walk ===
May 11

Rank	Name	Nationality	Time	Notes
1st place, gold medalist(s)	Jefferson Pérez	Ecuador	1:23:51	
2nd place, silver medalist(s)	Julio René Martínez	Guatemala	1:24:31	
3rd place, bronze medalist(s)	Luis Fernando García	Guatemala	1:25:27	
4	Claudio Erasmo Vargas	Mexico	1:26:25	
5	José Alejandro Cambil	Spain	1:27:25	
6	José Alessandro Bagio	Brazil	1:28:18	
7	Rogelio Sánchez	Mexico	1:28:44	
8	Fausto Quinde	Ecuador	1:31:24	
9	Sérgio Galdino	Brazil	1:32:12	
10	Allan Segura	Costa Rica	1:34:29	
11	Edwin Centeno	Peru	1:34:50	

=== High jump ===
May 12

Rank	Name	Nationality	1.80	1.85	1.90	1.95	2.00	2.05	2.08	2.11	2.14	2.17	2.20	2.23	2.26	2.30	Result	Notes
1st place, gold medalist(s)	Gilmar Mayo	Colombia	–	–	–	–	–	–	–	–	o	–	o	–	xo	xxx	2.26	
2nd place, silver medalist(s)	Jessé de Lima	Brazil	–	–	–	–	–	–	–	o	o	xo	o	o	xxx		2.23	
3rd place, bronze medalist(s)	Javier Bermejo	Spain	–	–	–	–	–	o	–	o	o	o	xxo	xo	xxx		2.23	
4	Fabrício Romero	Brazil	–	–	–	–	–	–	–	o	–	o	o	xxo	xxx		2.23	
5	Felipe Apablaza	Chile	–	–	–	–	–	–	–	o	o	–	o	xxx			2.20	
6	Julio Luciano	Dominican Republic	–	–	–	–	–	–	–	o	xo	–	xxo	xxx			2.20	
7	Omar Camacho	Puerto Rico	–	–	–	–	o	o	–	o	–	xxo	xxx				2.17	
8	Gerardo Martínez	Mexico	–	–	–	–	o	o	–	o	o	xxx					2.14	
8	Víctor Moya	Cuba	–	–	–	–	–	–	o	–	o	xxx					2.14	
10	Lemen Fatty	Spain	–	–	–	–	o	o	–	xo	xxx						2.11	
11	Tulio Ernesto Quiroz	Honduras	–	–	xxo	xxx											1.90	
12	Emerson Cruz	Guatemala	o	xxx													1.80	

=== Pole vault ===
May 11

Rank	Name	Nationality	4.60	4.80	5.00	5.10	5.15	5.20	5.25	5.30	5.45	Result	Notes
1st place, gold medalist(s)	Javier Benítez	Argentina	–	–	xo	–	o	–	o	–	xxx	5.25	
2nd place, silver medalist(s)	Nuno Fernandes	Portugal	–	o	xo	–	–	xo	–	xxx		5.20	
3rd place, bronze medalist(s)	José Francisco Nava	Chile	–	xo	xo	–	o	xxo	–	xxx		5.20	
4	Edgar León	Mexico	–	–	xo	xo	–	xxo	xxx			5.20	
5	Gustavo Rehder	Brazil	–	o	xo	–	xo	–	xxx			5.15	
6	Henrique Martins	Brazil	–	o	o	–	xxx					5.00	
6	Jorge Naranjo	Chile	o	o	o	xxx						5.00	
	Ricardo Diez	Venezuela	–	–	xxx							NM	
	Robert Villa	Spain	–	xxx								NM	
	Jorge Solórzano	Guatemala	–	–	xxx							NM	

=== Long jump ===
May 11

Rank	Name	Nationality	#1	#2	#3	#4	#5	#6	Result	Notes
1st place, gold medalist(s)	Ibrahim Camejo	Cuba	7.83	x	7.75	x	x	x	7.83	
2nd place, silver medalist(s)	José Miguel Martínez	Spain	7.43	7.53	7.70	7.54	7.62	7.75	7.75	
3rd place, bronze medalist(s)	Thiago Dias	Brazil	7.37	x	7.48	7.61	x	7.73	7.73	
4	Marcos da Costa	Brazil	7.71	7.50	7.61	x	7.48	7.37	7.71	
5	Antonio Adsuar	Spain	7.44	x	7.60	x	x	x	7.60	
6	Pablo Quiroga	Chile	6.68	7.06	7.25	6.95	x	7.37	7.37	
7	Álvaro Piaz	Guatemala	x	x	6.60	6.84	6.67	7.13	7.13	
8	Julio Valverde	Costa Rica	6.64	x	6.75	6.67	6.98	6.81	6.98	
	Esteban Capuano	Venezuela	x	–	–				NM	
	Jorge Naranjo	Chile	x	x	x				NM	

=== Triple jump ===
May 12

Rank	Name	Nationality	#1	#2	#3	#4	#5	#6	Result	Notes
1st place, gold medalist(s)	Jadel Gregório	Brazil	16.27	16.90	16.81	x	x	16.68	16.90	
2nd place, silver medalist(s)	Aliecer Urrutia	Cuba	16.26	x	x	–	–	–	16.26	
3rd place, bronze medalist(s)	Felipe Apablaza	Chile	15.06	x	15.35	15.57	15.86	13.96	15.86	
4	Antonio da Costa	Brazil	13.54	15.45	x	14.67	15.31	x	15.45	
5	Álvaro Piaz	Guatemala	14.42	x	x	14.87	x	15.23	15.23	

=== Shot put ===
May 11

Rank	Name	Nationality	#1	#2	#3	#4	#5	#6	Result	Notes
1st place, gold medalist(s)	Marco Antonio Verni	Chile	x	17.34	18.44	19.79	19.09	x	19.79	
2nd place, silver medalist(s)	Yojer Medina	Venezuela	18.32	18.61	19.11	19.27	19.22	19.21	19.27	
3rd place, bronze medalist(s)	Jhonny Rodríguez	Colombia	18.87	x	18.59	18.47	18.54	x	18.87	
4	Gustavo de Mendoça	Brazil	x	16.89	17.52	15.10	15.66	17.00	17.52	
5	Édson Miguel	Brazil	16.08	16.86	x	x	16.33	x	16.86	
6	Daniel Munoz	Chile	16.16	16.53	x	15.89	x	16.45	16.53	
7	Edson Monzón	Guatemala	x	15.07	14.68	14.40	x	x	15.07	
8	Henry Santos	Guatemala	14.39	14.90	14.12	14.33	x	14.48	14.90	

=== Discus throw ===
May 12

Rank	Name	Nationality	#1	#2	#3	#4	#5	#6	Result	Notes
1st place, gold medalist(s)	Marcelo Pugliese	Argentina	x	59.00	x	x	57.63	x	59.00	
2nd place, silver medalist(s)	Paulo Bernardo	Portugal	54.54	x	x	x	x	58.22	58.22	
3rd place, bronze medalist(s)	Gustavo de Mendoça	Brazil	51.66	49.77	51.07	49.69	49.92	52.20	52.20	
4	Yojer Medina	Venezuela	x	x	47.24	x	51.20	x	51.20	
5	Marco Antonio Verni	Chile	x	50.68	x	x	x	48.59	50.68	
6	Alessandro Rosa	Brazil	x	47.54	x	50.50	49.16	49.33	50.50	
7	Nelson Chavarría	Costa Rica	x	41.53	44.80	x	44.88	44.50	44.88	
8	Raúl Rivera	Guatemala	x	x	37.44	39.03	37.15	x	39.03	
	Luis Carlos Puerto	Honduras	x	x	x				NM	

=== Hammer throw ===
May 11

Rank	Name	Nationality	#1	#2	#3	#4	#5	#6	Result	Notes
1st place, gold medalist(s)	Moisés Campeny	Spain	x	69.60	65.59	70.30	69.78	69.00	70.30	
2nd place, silver medalist(s)	Yosmel Montes	Cuba	x	68.96	69.38	x	x	x	69.38	
3rd place, bronze medalist(s)	Adrián Marzo	Argentina	x	66.71	x	66.58	66.71	65.53	66.71	
4	Patricio Palma	Chile	63.27	63.93	60.20	61.74	63.60	63.83	63.93	
5	José Manuel Llano	Chile	x	x	57.07	x	60.57	62.01	62.01	
6	Carlos Valencia	Mexico	60.33	x	x	x	59.45	60.95	60.95	
7	Mário Leme	Brazil	x	60.74	60.27	55.35	x	59.15	60.74	
8	Raúl Rivera	Guatemala	59.35	58.96	58.60	x	59.82	x	59.82	
9	Ignacio Calderón	Spain	x	x	56.11				56.11	
10	Diego Berríos	Guatemala	x	42.31	46.48				46.48	

=== Javelin throw ===
May 11

Rank	Name	Nationality	#1	#2	#3	#4	#5	#6	Result	Notes
1st place, gold medalist(s)	Isbel Luaces	Cuba	x	81.64	79.35	77.05	75.14	78.16	81.64	
2nd place, silver medalist(s)	Luiz Fernando da Silva	Brazil	72.15	71.56	x	x	74.66	73.12	74.66	
3rd place, bronze medalist(s)	Ronald Noguera	Venezuela	69.00	65.58	66.46	64.84	72.23	70.09	72.23	
4	Manuel Fuenmayor	Venezuela	66.96	x	70.06	x	68.96	70.15	70.15	
5	Alexon Maximiano	Brazil	64.95	x	67.98	–	–	–	67.98	
6	Pablo Pietrobelli	Argentina	59.94	61.45	67.66	61.37	65.47	x	67.66	
7	Diego Moraga	Chile	65.23	66.18	x	x	67.58	64.34	67.58	
8	Rigoberto Calderón	Nicaragua	63.99	x	x	62.76	66.05	x	66.05	
9	Gustavo Siller	Mexico	60.51	63.32	62.76				63.32	
10	Daniel Alonzo	Dominican Republic	60.63	x	61.51				61.51	
11	Henry Saneaux	Dominican Republic	57.66	58.41	x				58.41	

=== Decathlon ===
May 11–12

The highest mark recorded in each event is highlighted in yellow

Rank	Athlete	Nationality	100m	LJ	SP	HJ	400m	110m H	DT	PV	JT	1500m	Points	Notes
1st place, gold medalist(s)	Yosbel Gómez	Cuba	10.96	7.06	13.08	1.91	48.60	15.01	42.68	3.50	66.09	4:53.67	7449	
2nd place, silver medalist(s)	Édson Bindilatti	Brazil	11.25	7.07	12.16	2.09	49.65	15.20	39.80	4.70	41.80	5:03.75	7280	
3rd place, bronze medalist(s)	Iván Scolfaro da Silva	Brazil	11.46	6.69	13.15	1.97	50.90	15.39	38.92	4.30	56.08	4:50.29	7172	
4	Eric Kerwitz	Argentina	11.22	7.10	11.72	1.88	50.01	15.49	31.17	4.20	55.88	5:03.75	6915	
5	Enrique Aguirre	Argentina	11.18	6.84	13.33	1.91	50.53	15.34	35.39	NM	47.74	5:51.86	6031	
	Cristián Lyon	Chile	11.35	7.29	11.91	1.91	53.65	15.65	31.94	NM	DNS	–	DNF	

== Women's results ==
=== 100 meters ===
Heats – May 11
Wind:
Heat 1: +1.5 m/s, Heat 2: +0.5 m/s

Rank	Heat	Name	Nationality	Time	Notes
1	1	Roxana Díaz	Cuba	11.31	Q
2	1	Thatiana Regina Ignâcio	Brazil	11.54	Q
3	2	Severina Cravid	Portugal	11.63	Q
4	2	Norma González	Colombia	11.65	Q
5	2	Lucimar de Moura	Brazil	11.66	Q
6	1	Melissa Murillo	Colombia	11.76	Q
7	2	Vanesa Wohlgemuth	Argentina	11.83	q
8	1	Gabriela Moya	Costa Rica	11.96	q
9	2	Sicylle Jeria	Chile	11.97	
10	2	Ana Caicedo	Ecuador	12.01	
11	1	María Izabel Coloma	Chile	12.09	

Final – May 11
Wind:
+2.3 m/s

Rank	Name	Nationality	Time	Notes
1st place, gold medalist(s)	Roxana Díaz	Cuba	11.32	
2nd place, silver medalist(s)	Thatiana Regina Ignâcio	Brazil	11.49	
3rd place, bronze medalist(s)	Severina Cravid	Portugal	11.53	
4	Norma González	Colombia	11.59	
5	Vanesa Wohlgemuth	Argentina	11.72	
6	Melissa Murillo	Colombia	11.74	
7	Lucimar de Moura	Brazil	11.88	
8	Gabriela Moya	Costa Rica	11.96	

=== 200 meters ===
Heats – May 12
Wind:
Heat 1: -1.9 m/s, Heat 2: +1.9 m/s

Rank	Heat	Name	Nationality	Time	Notes
1	2	Roxana Díaz	Cuba	22.80	Q, CR
2	2	Felipa Palacios	Colombia	22.99	Q
3	1	Norma González	Colombia	24.01	Q
4	2	Lorena de Oliveira	Brazil	24.05	Q
5	1	Kátia Regina Santos	Brazil	24.09	Q
6	1	Severina Cravid	Portugal	24.40	Q
7	2	Vanesa Wohlgemuth	Argentina	24.62	q
8	1	Gabriela Moya	Costa Rica	24.65	q
9	1	Sicylle Jeria	Chile	24.90	

Final – May 12
Wind:
+2.7 m/s

Rank	Name	Nationality	Time	Notes
1st place, gold medalist(s)	Felipa Palacios	Colombia	22.76	
2nd place, silver medalist(s)	Roxana Díaz	Cuba	23.00	
3rd place, bronze medalist(s)	Norma González	Colombia	23.47	
4	Kátia Regina Santos	Brazil	23.77	
5	Lorena de Oliveira	Brazil	23.92	
6	Severina Cravid	Portugal	24.04	
7	Vanesa Wohlgemuth	Argentina	24.36	
8	Gabriela Moya	Costa Rica	24.39	

=== 400 meters ===
Heats – May 11

Rank	Heat	Name	Nationality	Time	Notes
1	1	Ana Pena	Cuba	53.12	Q
2	2	Maria Laura Almirao	Brazil	53.21	Q
3	1	Lucimar Teodoro	Brazil	53.45	Q
4	1	Mirtha Brock	Colombia	53.73	Q
5	1	Beatriz Cruz	Puerto Rico	54.07	q
6	2	Eliana Pacheco	Venezuela	54.63	Q
7	2	Lorena de la Rosa	Dominican Republic	54.79	Q
8	1	Clara Hernández	Dominican Republic	56.27	q
9	2	Lucy Jaramillo	Ecuador	56.63	
10	1	Patricia Valenzuela	Guatemala	1:00.83	

Final – May 12

Rank	Name	Nationality	Time	Notes
1st place, gold medalist(s)	Maria Laura Almirao	Brazil	52.14	
2nd place, silver medalist(s)	Lucimar Teodoro	Brazil	52.55	
3rd place, bronze medalist(s)	Ana Pena	Cuba	52.74	
4	Beatriz Cruz	Puerto Rico	53.50	
5	Mirtha Brock	Colombia	53.52	
6	Clara Hernández	Dominican Republic	54.08	
7	Lorena de la Rosa	Dominican Republic	54.16	
8	Eliana Pacheco	Venezuela	54.79	

=== 800 meters ===
May 11

Rank	Name	Nationality	Time	Notes
1st place, gold medalist(s)	Christiane dos Santos	Brazil	2:06.30	
2nd place, silver medalist(s)	Sandra Moya	Puerto Rico	2:06.71	
3rd place, bronze medalist(s)	Niusha Mancilla	Bolivia	2:08.53	
4	Lysaira del Valle	Puerto Rico	2:09.72	
5	Rocío Rodríguez	Spain	2:09.90	
6	Juliana de Azevedo	Brazil	2:10.15	
7	Alheli Tapia	Mexico	2:11.59	
8	Ana Lucía Hurtado	Guatemala	2:12.79	

=== 1500 meters ===
May 12

Rank	Name	Nationality	Time	Notes
1st place, gold medalist(s)	Adoración García	Spain	4:22.37	
2nd place, silver medalist(s)	Niusha Mancilla	Bolivia	4:25.25	
3rd place, bronze medalist(s)	Valeria Rodríguez	Argentina	4:27.41	
4	Michelle Costa	Brazil	4:35.11	
5	Evelyn Guerra	Panama	4:43.37	
6	Dina Cruz	Guatemala	4:43.57	
7	Gabriela Trana	Costa Rica	4:47.81	
	Christiane dos Santos	Brazil	DNF	

=== 3000 meters ===
May 12

Rank	Name	Nationality	Time	Notes
1st place, gold medalist(s)	Nora Rocha	Mexico	9:28.12	
2nd place, silver medalist(s)	Margarita Tapia	Mexico	9:29.61	
3rd place, bronze medalist(s)	Bertha Sánchez	Colombia	9:34.99	
4	Selma dos Reis	Brazil	9:37.65	
5	Lucélia Peres	Brazil	9:58.48	
6	Mónica Amboya	Ecuador	10:17.12	
	Érika Olivera	Chile	DNF	

=== 5000 meters ===
May 11

Rank	Name	Nationality	Time	Notes
1st place, gold medalist(s)	Adriana Fernández	Mexico	16:25.25	
2nd place, silver medalist(s)	América Mateos	Mexico	16:26.81	
3rd place, bronze medalist(s)	Lucélia Peres	Brazil	16:45.25	
4	Bertha Sánchez	Colombia	17:00.36	
5	Dina Cruz	Guatemala	18:06.91	
6	Gabriela Trana	Costa Rica	18:48.67	
	Elsa Monterroso	Guatemala	DNF	
	Érika Olivera	Chile	DNF	

=== 100 meters hurdles ===
May 12
Wind:
+1.0 m/s

Rank	Name	Nationality	Time	Notes
1st place, gold medalist(s)	Maíla Machado	Brazil	13.15	
2nd place, silver medalist(s)	Gilvaneide de Oliveira	Brazil	13.46	
3rd place, bronze medalist(s)	Princesa Oliveros	Colombia	13.53	
4	Francisca Guzmán	Chile	13.71	
5	Lucila Contreras	Mexico	13.92	
6	Astrid Stoopen	Mexico	14.44	
7	Carolina Castellán	Guatemala	15.58	

=== 400 meters hurdles ===
May 11

Rank	Name	Nationality	Time	Notes
1st place, gold medalist(s)	Isabel Silva	Brazil	56.99	
2nd place, silver medalist(s)	Princesa Oliveros	Colombia	57.37	
3rd place, bronze medalist(s)	Ivonne Harrison	Puerto Rico	58.22	
4	Lucy Jaramillo	Ecuador	1:00.84	
5	Luciana França	Brazil	1:00.97	
6	Patricia Valenzuela	Guatemala	1:04.36	

=== 3000 meters steeplechase ===
May 11

Rank	Name	Nationality	Time	Notes
1st place, gold medalist(s)	Michelle Costa	Brazil	10:36.5	
2nd place, silver medalist(s)	Érika Olivera	Chile	10:48.5	
3rd place, bronze medalist(s)	Mónica Amboya	Ecuador	11:02.7	
4	María Peralta	Argentina	11:40.3	
5	Anahí Soto	Chile	12:17.0	
	Cintia dos Santos	Brazil	DNF	

=== 4 x 100 meters relay ===
May 11

Rank	Nation	Competitors	Time	Notes
1st place, gold medalist(s)	Brazil	Thatiana Regina Ignâcio, Rosemar Maria Neto, Lucimar de Moura, Kátia Regina Santos	44.28	
2nd place, silver medalist(s)	Colombia	Melissa Murillo, Mirtha Brock, Felipa Palacios, Norma González	44.44	

=== 4 x 400 meters relay ===
May 11

Rank	Nation	Competitors	Time	Notes
1st place, gold medalist(s)	Brazil	Lucimar Teodoro, Geisa Coutinho, Claudete Alves Pina, Maria Laura Almirao	3:33.13	
2nd place, silver medalist(s)	Colombia	Felipa Palacios, Mirtha Brock, Princesa Oliveros, Norma González	3:33.35	
3rd place, bronze medalist(s)	Puerto Rico	Beatriz Cruz, Militza Castro, Sandra Moya, Yvonne Harrison	3:34.26	
4	Guatemala	Patricia Valenzuela, Dina Cruz, Sofia Briz, Ana Lucía Hurtado	4:11.62	

=== 20,000 meters walk ===
May 12

Rank	Name	Nationality	Time	Notes
1st place, gold medalist(s)	Aura Morales	Mexico	1:36:58	
2nd place, silver medalist(s)	Geovana Irusta	Bolivia	1:37:32	
3rd place, bronze medalist(s)	Francisca Martínez	Mexico	1:38:28	
4	Teresita Collado	Guatemala	1:41:56	
5	Gianetti Bonfim	Brazil	1:42:43	
6	Ariana Quino	Bolivia	1:43:40	
	Cristina López	El Salvador	DNF	
	Alessandra Picagevicz	Brazil	DNF	
	Ivis Martínez	El Salvador	DQ	

=== High jump ===
May 12

Rank	Name	Nationality	1.60	1.65	1.70	1.75	1.78	1.81	1.84	1.87	1.91	Result	Notes
1st place, gold medalist(s)	Juana Arrendel	Dominican Republic	–	–	–	o	o	o	o	xxo	xxx	1.87	
2nd place, silver medalist(s)	Luciane Dambacher	Brazil	–	o	o	xo	xo	o	o	xxx		1.84	
3rd place, bronze medalist(s)	Thais de Andrade	Brazil	–	o	o	o	o	xo	xxx			1.81	
	Meryann Roesch	Guatemala	xxx									NM	

=== Pole vault ===
May 12

Rank	Name	Nationality	3.30	3.40	3.50	3.60	3.70	3.75	3.80	3.90	4.00	4.10	4.15	4.25	4.35	Result	Notes
1st place, gold medalist(s)	Alejandra García	Argentina	–	–	–	–	–	–	–	–	o	–	o	o	xxx	4.25	
2nd place, silver medalist(s)	Karla Rosa da Silva	Brazil	–	o	–	o	o	–	o	o	xo	xxx				4.00	
3rd place, bronze medalist(s)	Alina Alló	Argentina	–	–	–	o	o	–	o	o	xxx					3.90	
4	Michelle Vélez	Puerto Rico	–	–	–	xo	o	–	xxo	o	xxx					3.90	
5	Déborah Gyurcsek	Uruguay	–	–	o	xo	xxo	–	xxx							3.70	
6	Andrea Zambrana	Puerto Rico	–	xo	–	xo	xxo	xxx								3.70	
6	Alejandra Meza	Mexico	–	–	o	xxo	xxo	–	xxx							3.70	
8	Pamela Barnet	Chile	o	–	o	–	xxx									3.50	
	Rosângela da Silva	Brazil	xxx													NM	

=== Long jump ===
May 11

Rank	Name	Nationality	#1	#2	#3	#4	#5	#6	Result	Notes
1st place, gold medalist(s)	Maurren Maggi	Brazil	x	6.73	6.74	6.86	6.97	6.64	6.97	
2nd place, silver medalist(s)	Yesenia Rivera	Puerto Rico	x	6.16	x	6.33	x	x	6.33	
3rd place, bronze medalist(s)	Yudelkis Fernández	Cuba	6.10	x	x	x	5.71	5.98	6.10	
4	Maria de Souza	Brazil	5.66	5.92	5.90	x	5.95	x	5.95	
5	Jennifer Arveláez	Venezuela	5.66	5.92	5.90	x	5.95	x	5.88	
6	Mónica Castro	Chile	5.36	5.46	5.55	5.55	5.46	5.44	5.55	
7	Sabrina Asturias	Guatemala	5.37	5.42	5.48	x	x	5.54	5.54	
8	Mónica Valverde	Costa Rica	x	5.50	5.29	x	x	5.11	5.50	

=== Triple jump ===
May 12

Rank	Name	Nationality	#1	#2	#3	#4	#5	#6	Result	Notes
1st place, gold medalist(s)	Mabel Gay	Cuba	13.57	13.99	14.18	x	–	14.06	14.18	
2nd place, silver medalist(s)	Jennifer Arveláez	Venezuela	13.65	13.65w	13.52	13.45	–	12.76	13.65	
3rd place, bronze medalist(s)	Luciana dos Santos	Brazil	13.23	x	13.34	13.18	x	13.53w	13.53w	
4	María José Paiz	Guatemala	x	12.82	13.13w	12.75	–	–	13.13w	
5	Mónica Falcioni	Uruguay	13.02	12.85	12.76	12.58	12.64	12.59w	13.02	
6	Peggy Ovalle	Guatemala	11.61	11.30	11.34	11.19	x	x	11.61	

=== Shot put ===
May 12

Rank	Name	Nationality	#1	#2	#3	#4	#5	#6	Result	Notes
1st place, gold medalist(s)	Yumileidi Cumbá	Cuba	x	18.14	18.87	x	18.66	18.48	18.87	
2nd place, silver medalist(s)	Martina de la Puente	Spain	17.20	17.10	16.99	16.78	x	16.35	17.20	
3rd place, bronze medalist(s)	Elisângela Adriano	Brazil	16.63	–	–	–	–	–	16.63	
4	Fior Vásquez	Dominican Republic	15.42	15.78	15.64	15.73	15.23	x	15.78	
5	Luz Dary Castro	Colombia	x	15.61	15.57	15.47	x	15.36	15.61	
6	Marianne Berndt	Chile	15.18	15.22	x	14.50	14.84	15.05	15.22	
7	Andréa Pereira	Brazil	14.46	14.38	x	14.74	14.76	14.94	14.94	
8	Neolanis Suárez	Venezuela	13.45	x	14.04	x	14.08	14.02	14.08	

=== Discus throw ===
May 11

Rank	Name	Nationality	#1	#2	#3	#4	#5	#6	Result	Notes
1st place, gold medalist(s)	Elisângela Adriano	Brazil	58.20	57.43	54.76	x	–	–	58.20	
2nd place, silver medalist(s)	Yania Ferrales	Cuba	51.01	48.81	56.12	57.63	55.77	53.13	57.63	
3rd place, bronze medalist(s)	Luz Dary Castro	Colombia	x	53.91	x	51.64	x	x	53.91	
4	Renata de Figueiredo	Brazil	39.27	48.69	52.84	47.93	46.98	47.01	52.84	
5	Neolanis Suárez	Venezuela	49.53	47.89	x	46.52	50.70	50.31	50.70	
6	Karina Díaz	Ecuador	41.77	x	x	42.48	43.64	43.22	43.64	
7	Ana Lucía Espinoza	Guatemala	x	42.87	41.03	43.29	40.44	43.21	43.29	
8	Yessica Gómez	Honduras	x	x	35.99	x	33.92	x	35.99	

=== Hammer throw ===
May 11

Rank	Name	Nationality	#1	#2	#3	#4	#5	#6	Result	Notes
1st place, gold medalist(s)	Vânia Silva	Portugal	65.02	63.11	x	63.23	64.51	64.31	65.02	
2nd place, silver medalist(s)	Aldenay Vasallo	Cuba	59.90	x	x	60.34	63.75	63.61	63.75	
3rd place, bronze medalist(s)	Dolores Pedrares	Spain	59.14	61.83	61.52	x	61.10	x	61.83	
4	Josiane Soares	Brazil	59.21	x	57.94	57.63	x	x	59.21	
5	Karina Moya	Argentina	54.60	x	54.53	x	x	56.19	56.19	
6	María Eugenia Villamizar	Colombia	54.59	52.75	52.76	x	52.92	53.10	54.59	
7	Katiuscia de Jesus	Brazil	50.25	63.53	54.49	52.14	53.71	53.55	54.49	
8	Amarilys Alméstica	Puerto Rico	54.39	x	x	48.15	54.09	54.48	54.48	
9	Adriana Benaventa	Venezuela	50.29	52.40	x				52.40	
10	Dubraska Rodríguez	Venezuela	x	50.76	x				50.76	
11	Odette Palma	Chile	x	49.69	50.65				50.65	
12	Silvana Avila	Uruguay	46.66	x	46.58				46.66	

=== Javelin throw ===
May 12

Rank	Name	Nationality	#1	#2	#3	#4	#5	#6	Result	Notes
1st place, gold medalist(s)	Sabina Moya	Colombia	55.83	55.22	53.44	62.62	53.74	53.78	62.62	
2nd place, silver medalist(s)	Xiomara Rivero	Cuba	55.56	60.17	59.41	61.41	x	60.25	61.41	
3rd place, bronze medalist(s)	Marta Míguez	Spain	49.82	x	58.06	x	55.85	53.16	58.06	
4	Mercedes Chilla	Spain	x	x	56.30	57.74	57.08	x	57.74	
5	Alessandra Resende	Brazil	x	51.86	x	x	x	47.15	51.86	
6	María González	Venezuela	39.08	47.53	51.04	49.91	50.06	x	51.04	
7	Silvia de Oliveira	Brazil	x	x	45.77	44.04	45.45	46.38	46.38	
8	Dalila Rugama	Nicaragua	43.52	40.89	42.29	x	42.28	40.13	43.52	

=== Heptathlon ===
May 11–12

The highest mark recorded in each event is highlighted in yellow

Rank	Athlete	Nationality	100m H	HJ	SP	200m	LJ	JT	800m	Points	Notes
1st place, gold medalist(s)	Yuleidis Limonta	Cuba	14.26	1.84	12.10	25.41	5.95	36.49	2:31.83	5593	
2nd place, silver medalist(s)	Elizete da Silva	Brazil	14.61	1.66	11.41	25.97	5.62	39.85	2:24.19	5288	
3rd place, bronze medalist(s)	Anabella von Kesselstatt	Argentina	14.20	1.69	9.55	24.85	5.72w	28.63	2:19.68	5237	
4	Valeria Steffens	Chile	14.91	1.60	11.88	25.81	5.22	38.42	2:23.64	5089	
5	Judith Méndez	Dominican Republic	14.30	1.57	12.20	25.09	5.25	42.02	2:47.93	5009	
6	Patricia de Oliveira	Brazil	15.08	1.60	9.81	26.20	5.53	34.93	2:19.79	4969	
7	Sheila Acosta	Puerto Rico	14.92	1.60	12.81	26.82	5.20	39.99	2:38.54	4901	
