= 2002 Ibero-American Championships in Athletics =

X Ibero-American Championships
- Dates: 11 & 12 May
- Host city: Ciudad de Guatemala, Guatemala
- Venue: Estadio Cementos Progreso
- Events: 44
- Participation: 312 athletes from 21 nations
- Records set: 6 Championship records

The 2002 Ibero-American Championships in Athletics (Spanish: X Campeonato Iberoamericano de Atletismo) was the tenth edition of the international athletics competition between Ibero-American nations which was held at the Estadio Cementos Progreso in Ciudad de Guatemala, Guatemala on 11 and 12 May. A total of 328 athletes participated in the 44-event programme. The 3000 metres was introduced for both men and women, replacing the longer 10,000 metres event.

Following on from the success of the 2001 Central American and Caribbean Championships in Athletics and 2001 Central American Games, Guatemala hosted the Ibero-American Championships for the first time. The competition was a factor for selection for the Americas team in the 2002 IAAF World Cup. Cuba, Spain and Portugal all sent small delegations to the competition, which was held at an altitude of 1402 m – a factor which raised performances in the sprints and jumps.

Brazil topped the medal table for the second time running, taking 38 medals (15 of them gold) from the events. Despite its reduced numbers, Cuba placed second as its athletes won eight events and 16 medals overall. Mexico had the next highest number of event winners, with five gold medallists, while Colombia had the third highest medal haul (13). Fifteen of the 21 nations present reached the medal table.

Six new championship records were set at the competition. Maurren Maggi cleared a record of 6.97 m to win the long jump, while Isbel Luaces's javelin throw of 81.64 m bettered the championship record. Vânia Silva improved the women's hammer throw mark by several metres. Uruguay's Heber Viera and Brazil's Vicente de Lima needed a photo finish to separate them in the 100 metres. The Uruguayan took the honours by 2/1000 of a second – a difference which may have been made by de Lima's premature celebration before the line. Viera went on take the 200 metres silver in a Uruguayan record time.

Former Olympic champion Jefferson Pérez was present for the men's racewalk and won by half a minute. Hudson de Souza defended his 800/1500 metres double from the 2000 edition. Others to defend their titles were Alejandra García in the women's pole vault, Felipa Palacios in the 200 m and Gilmar Mayo in the men's high jump.

== Medal summary ==
=== Men ===
Event	Gold		Silver		Bronze	
100 metres (Wind: 3.0 m/s)	Heber Viera (URU)	10.08w	Vicente de Lima (BRA)	10.08w	Édson Ribeiro (BRA)	10.22w
200 metres	André da Silva (BRA)	20.22	Heber Viera (URU)	20.46 NR	John Jairo Córdoba (COL)	20.99
400 metres	Carlos Santa (DOM)	45.69	Jonathan Palma (VEN)	46.09	Ricardo Roach (CHI)	46.37
800 metres	Hudson de Souza (BRA)	1:46.74	Osmar dos Santos (BRA)	1:46.81	Ricardo Etheridge (PUR)	1:47.08
1500 metres	Hudson de Souza (BRA)	3:45.46	Manuel Damião (POR)	3:47.09	Javier Carriqueo (ARG)	3:48.73
3000 metres	Pablo Villalobos (ESP)	8:10.28 CR	Alejandro Suárez (MEX)	8:10.62	José David Galván (MEX)	8:12.18
5000 metres	Alejandro Suárez (MEX)	14:16.22	Teodoro Vega (MEX)	14:17.18	Mauricio Díaz (CHI)	14:19.92
110 metres hurdles	Paulo Villar (COL)	13.57	Mateus Inocêncio (BRA)	13.58	Anselmo da Silva (BRA)	13.66
400 metres hurdles	Sergio Hierrezuelo (CUB)	50.60	Eronilde de Araújo (BRA)	50.78	Cleverson da Silva (BRA)	50.88
3000 metres steeplechase	Salvador Miranda (MEX)	8:47.79	José María González (ESP)	8:50.72	Francisco Munuera (ESP)	8:59.95
4×100 metres relay	Brazil (BRA); Vicente de Lima; Édson Ribeiro; André da Silva; Fabio Gonçalves Silva	38.58	Puerto Rico (PUR); Carlos Santos; Jesús Carrión; Osvaldo Nieves; Rogelio Pizarro	39.47	Venezuela (VEN); Juan Morillo; Ellis Ollarves; José Carabalí; Nilson Palacios	40.15
4×400 metres relay	Brazil (BRA); Luis Enrique Serra da Silveira; Luiz Antonio Eloi; Diego Venancio; Flavio Godoy	3:05.71	Venezuela (VEN); José Carabalí; Danny Núñez; Luis Luna; Jonathan Palma	3:08.87	Puerto Rico (PUR); Jorge Richardson; Ricardo Etheridge; Alexander Greaux; Rogelio Pizarro	3:12.64
20,000 m track walk	Jefferson Pérez (ECU)	1:23:51	Julio René Martínez (GUA)	1:24:31	Luis García (GUA)	1:25:27
High jump ^{†}	Gilmar Mayo (COL)	2.26 m	Jessé de Lima (BRA)	2.23 m	Javier Bermejo (ESP)	2.23 m
Pole vault ^{‡}	Javier Benítez (ARG)	5.25 m	Nuno Fernandes (POR)	5.20 m	José Francisco Nava (CHI)	5.20 m
Long jump	Ibrahim Camejo (CUB)	7.83 m	José Miguel Martínez (ESP)	7.75 m	Thiago Dias (BRA)	7.73 m
Triple jump	Jadel Gregório (BRA)	16.90 m	Aliecer Urrutia (CUB)	16.26 m	Felipe Apablaza (CHI)	15.86 m
Shot put	Marco Antonio Verni (CHI)	19.79 m	Yojer Medina (VEN)	19.27 m	Jhonny Rodríguez (COL)	18.87 m
Discus throw	Marcelo Pugliese (ARG)	59.00 m	Paulo Bernardo (POR)	58.22 m	Gustavo de Mendonça (BRA)	52.20 m
Hammer throw	Moisés Campeny (ESP)	70.30 m	Yosmel Montes (CUB)	69.38 m	Adrián Marzo (ARG)	66.71 m
Javelin throw	Isbel Luaces (CUB)	81.64 m CR	Luiz Fernando da Silva (BRA)	74.66 m	Ronald Noguera (VEN)	72.23 m
Decathlon	Yosbel Gómez (CUB)	7449 pts	Édson Bindilatti (BRA)	7280 pts	Ivan da Silva (BRA)	7172 pts

- ^{†} Note: The results for the men's high jump listed by GBR Athletics conflict with those of the official report. Javier Bermejo (ESP) and Jessé de Lima (BRA) are listed as joint silver medallists, but Bermejo came third on countback.
- ^{‡} Note: The results for the men's pole vault listed by GBR Athletics conflict with those of the official report. José Francisco Nava (CHI) and Edgar León (MEX) are listed as joint silver medallists, but the athletes were third and fourth, respectively, on countback.

=== Women ===
Event	Gold		Silver		Bronze	
100 metres (Wind: 2.3 m/s)	Roxana Díaz (CUB)	11.32w	Thatiana Ignácio (BRA)	11.49w	Severina Cravid (POR)	11.53w
200 metres (Wind: 2.7 m/s)	Felipa Palacios (COL)	22.76w	Roxana Díaz (CUB)	23.00w	Norma González (COL)	23.47w
400 metres	Maria Laura Almirão (BRA)	52.14	Lucimar Teodoro (BRA)	52.55	Ana Peña (CUB)	52.74
800 metres	Christiane dos Santos (BRA)	2:06.30	Sandra Moya (PUR)	2:06.71	Niusha Mancilla (BOL)	2:08.53
1500 metres	Adoración García (ESP)	4:22.37	Niusha Mancilla (BOL)	4:25.25	Valeria Rodríguez (ARG)	4:27.41
3000 metres	Nora Rocha (MEX)	9:28.12	Margarita Tapia (MEX)	9:29.61	Bertha Sánchez (COL)	9:34.99
5000 metres	Adriana Fernández (MEX)	16:25.25	América Mateos (MEX)	16:26.81	Lucélia Peres (BRA)	16:45.25
100 metres hurdles	Maíla Machado (BRA)	13.15	Gilvaneide de Oliveira (BRA)	13.46	Princesa Oliveros (COL)	13.53
400 metres hurdles	Isabel Silva (BRA)	56.99	Princesa Oliveros (COL)	57.37	Yvonne Harrison (PUR)	58.22
3000 metres steeplechase	Michelle Costa (BRA)	10:36.47 CR	Érika Olivera (CHI)	10:48.75	Mónica Amboya (ECU)	11:02.68
4×100 metres relay	Brazil (BRA); Thatiana Ignácio; Rosemar Coelho Neto; Lucimar de Moura; Kátia de Jesus Santos	44.28	Colombia (COL); Melissa Murillo; Mirtha Brock; Felipa Palacios; Norma González	44.44	Only two teams started	
4×400 metres relay	Brazil (BRA); Lucimar Teodoro; Geisa Coutinho; Claudete Alves Pina; Maria Laura Almirao	3:33.13	Colombia (COL); Felipa Palacios; Mirtha Brock; Princesa Oliveros; Norma González	3:33.35	Puerto Rico (PUR); Beatriz Cruz; Militza Castro; Sandra Moya; Yvonne Harrison	3:34.26
20,000 m track walk	Aura Morales (MEX)	1:36:58 CR	Geovana Irusta (BOL)	1:37:32	Francisca Martínez (MEX)	1:38:28
High jump	Juana Arrendel (DOM)	1.87 m	Luciane Dambacher (BRA)	1.84 m	Thais de Andrade (BRA)	1.81 m
Pole vault ^{†}	Alejandra García (ARG)	4.25 m	Karla da Silva (BRA)	4.00 m	Alina Alló (ARG)	3.90 m
Long jump	Maurren Maggi (BRA)	6.97 m CR	Yesenia Rivera (PUR)	6.33 m	Yudelkis Fernández (CUB)	6.10 m
Triple jump	Mabel Gay (CUB)	14.18 m	Jennifer Arveláez (VEN)	13.65 m	Luciana dos Santos (BRA)	13.53 m
Shot put	Yumileidi Cumbá (CUB)	18.87 m	Martina de la Puente (ESP)	17.20 m	Elisângela Adriano (BRA)	16.63 m
Discus throw	Elisângela Adriano (BRA)	58.20 m	Yania Ferrales (CUB)	57.63 m	Luz Dary Castro (COL)	53.91 m
Hammer throw	Vânia Silva (POR)	65.02 m CR	Aldenay Vasallo (CUB)	63.75 m	Dolores Pedrares (ESP)	61.83 m
Javelin throw	Sabina Moya (COL)	62.62 m	Xiomara Rivero (CUB)	61.41 m	Marta Míguez (ESP)	58.06 m
Heptathlon	Yuleidis Limonta (CUB)	5593 pts	Elizete da Silva (BRA)	5288 pts	Anabella von Kesselstatt (ARG)	5237 pts

- ^{†} Note: The results for the women's pole vault listed by GBR Athletics conflict with those of the official report. Puerto Rico's Michelle Vélez is listed as joint bronze medallist, but she finished fourth on countback.

== Medal table ==
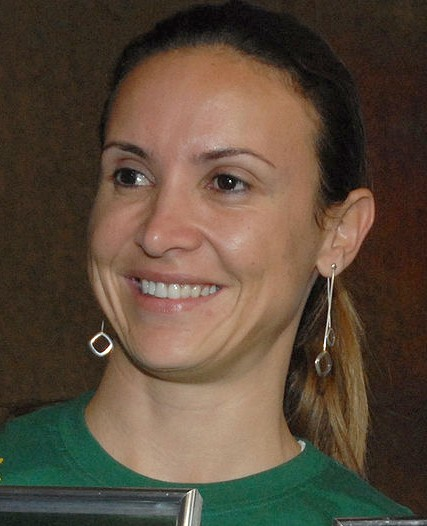
Brazilian Maurren Maggi's record in the long jump was a highlight.

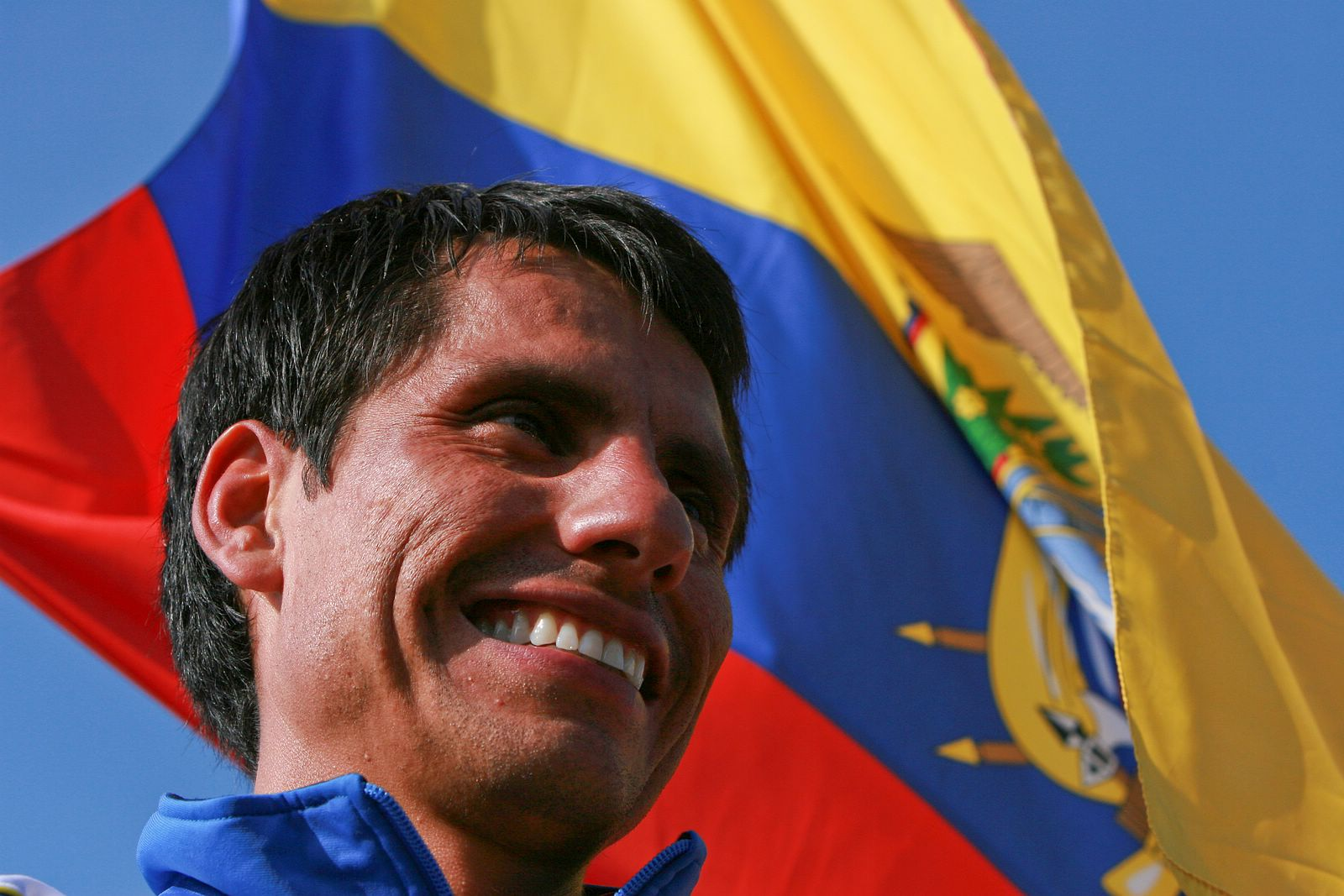
Ecuador's first Olympic champion Jefferson Pérez won a race walk gold medal.

* Host nation (Guatemala)

Rank	Nation	Gold	Silver	Bronze	Total
1	Brazil (BRA)	15	13	10	38
2	Cuba (CUB)	8	6	2	16
3	Mexico (MEX)	5	4	2	11
4	Colombia (COL)	4	3	6	13
5	Spain (ESP)	3	3	4	10
6	Argentina (ARG)	3	0	5	8
7	Dominican Republic (DOM)	2	0	0	2
8	Portugal (POR)	1	3	1	5
9	Chile (CHI)	1	1	4	6
10	Uruguay (URU)	1	1	0	2
11	Ecuador (ECU)	1	0	1	2
12	Venezuela (VEN)	0	4	2	6
13	Puerto Rico (PUR)	0	3	4	7
14	Bolivia (BOL)	0	2	1	3
15	Guatemala (GUA)*	0	1	1	2
Totals (15 entries)		44	44	43	131

- ^{†} Note: The medal table in the official 2010 report by RFEA incorrectly lists Argentina as having won a silver medal in the women's section. It also states that Venezuela gained one more men's bronze medal than it did (José Carabalí had the same 200 m time as the bronze medalist but was ranked fourth).

== Participation ==
Of the twenty-eight member nations of the Asociación Iberoamericana de Atletismo twenty-one sent delegations to the competition. None of the six African members took part. All the original 22 founding member nations were present with the sole exception of Paraguay. A total of 312 athletes participated at the event.

- Argentina (15)
- Bolivia (3)
- Brazil (71)
- Chile (23)
- Colombia (13)
- Costa Rica (12)
- Cuba (16)
- Dominican Republic (11)
- Ecuador (11)
- Guatemala (26)
- Honduras (7)
- Mexico (24)
- Nicaragua (2)
- Panama (3)
- Peru (1)
- Portugal (5)
- Puerto Rico (19)
- El Salvador (2)
- Spain (22)
- Uruguay (5)
- Venezuela (21)
