= Claudio Erasmo Vargas =

Mexican race walker (born 1974)

Personal information
- Born: 9 December 1974 (age 51)

Sport
- Sport: Race walking

Claudio Erasmo Vargas Castillo (born 9 December 1974) is a Mexican race walker.

== Achievements ==
Year	Competition	Venue	Position	Event	Notes
Representing Mexico
2002	Ibero-American Championships	Guatemala City, Guatemala	4th	20,000 m	1:26:25
2002	Central American and Caribbean Games	San Salvador, El Salvador	—	20 km	DQ
2005	Pan American Race Walking Cup	Lima, Peru	3rd	50 km	4:03:03
2006	World Race Walking Cup	A Coruña, Spain	12th	50 km	3:54:16
2010	Ibero-American Championships	San Fernando, Spain	4th	20,000 m	1:27:00.1
