= 2003 USA Outdoor Track and Field Championships =

- Dates: June 19–22
- Host city: Palo Alto, California
- Venue: Cobb Track & Angell Field
- Level: Senior
- Type: Outdoor
- Events: 40 (men: 20; women: 20)

The 2003 USA Outdoor Track and Field Championships was organised by USA Track & Field and held from June 19 to 22 at the Cobb Track & Angell Field in Palo Alto, California. The four-day competition served as the national championships in track and field for the United States and also the trials for the 2003 World Championships in Athletics.

It was the second consecutive time that the stadium in Palo Alto had held the combined gender national track and field event. The Cobb Track & Angell Field, connected to Stanford University, was the host of the annual Payton Jordan U.S. Open – a high-profile mixed senior and college level meet. The USA Junior Championships were held in conjunction with the event and the events served as selection for the 2003 Pan American Junior Athletics Championships. Senior performances also informed the team selection for the athletics sections of the 2003 Pan American Games and 2003 Summer Universiade.

Gail Devers had a fifth consecutive win in the women's 100 m hurdles, bringing her career total to nine national hurdles titles. Stacy Dragila also had her fifth straight win, bringing her total to seven titles. Marla Runyan won her third straight title in the 5000 m, while David Krummenacker achieved the same feat in the men's 800 m. Hurdler Allen Johnson extended his unbeaten streak to four titles, bringing him to a career sum of six. Breaux Greer won his fourth title to remain unbeaten in the men's javelin since 2000.

There was extensive doping at the competition, with national champions Kelli White (100 m and 200 m), Regina Jacobs (1500 m), Eric Thomas (400 m hurdles), Kevin Toth (shot put), and Melissa Price (hammer) all subsequently having their national titles removed from the record. Then-world record holder Tim Montgomery was also later disqualified, having finished as men's 100 m runner-up. The men's 400 m runner-up Calvin Harrison and women's 400 m hurdles third placer Sandra Glover had their performances annulled due to doping as well.

== Results ==
Key:

≠ Not selected for World Championships in Athletics due to failure to reach IAAF qualifying standard within the specified time limit

† Denied national team selection as another athlete subsequently banned for doping was sent to the World Championships in Athletics instead.

=== Men track events ===
Event	Gold		Silver		Bronze	
100 meters^{[dq1]} Wind +1.6	Bernard Williams	10.11	Jon Drummond	10.18	Coby Miller†	10.23
200 meters Wind +0.1	Darvis Patton	20.15	John Capel	20.17	Joshua J. Johnson	20.22
400 meters^{[dq2]}	Tyree Washington	44.33	Jerome Young	44.79	Derrick Brew†	45.05
800 meters	David Krummenacker	1:45.53	Khadevis Robinson	1:46.21	Jonathon Johnson≠	1:46.76
1500 meters	Jason Lunn	3:44.00	Bryan Berryhill≠	3:44.30	Grant Robison≠	3:44.83
5000 meters	Tim Broe≠	13:35.23	Adam Goucher≠	13:35.67	Jorge Torres	13:36.42
10,000 meters	Alan Culpepper	27:55.36	Meb Keflezighi	27:57.59	Dan Browne	28:03.48
110 m hurdles Wind -2.4	Allen Johnson	13.37	Terrence Trammell	13.38	Larry Wade	13.43
400 m hurdles^{[dq3]}	Bershawn Jackson	49.01	Joey Woody	49.22	James Carter†	49.23
3000 m s'chase	Steve Slattery	8:23.58	Daniel Lincoln	8:24.10	Robert Gary	8:24.82
20,000 m walk	Kevin Eastler	1:23:52.20	Tim Seaman≠	1:24:47.37	John Nunn≠	1:25:15.89

=== Men field events ===
Event	Gold		Silver		Bronze	
High jump	Jamie Nieto	2.30 m (7 ft 6 1/2 in)	Matt Hemingway	2.27 m (7 ft 5 1/4 in)	Terrance Woods≠	2.27 m (7 ft 5 1/4 in)
Pole vault	Jeff Hartwig	5.70 m (18 ft 8 1/4 in)	Derek Miles	5.70 m (18 ft 8 1/4 in)	Timothy Mack	5.70 m (18 ft 8 1/4 in)
Long jump	Dwight Phillips	8.24 m (27 ft 1/4 in)	Walter Davis	8.24 m (27 ft 1/4 in)	Savanté Stringfellow	8.22 m (26 ft 11 1/2 in)
Triple jump	Kenta Bell	17.59 m (57 ft 8 1/2 in)	Walter Davis	17.55 m (57 ft 6 3/4 in)	Tim Rusan	17.19 m (56 ft 4 3/4 in)
Shot put^{[dq4]}	John Godina	21.04 m (69 ft 1/4 in)	Reese Hoffa	20.64 m (67 ft 8 1/2 in)	Adam Nelson	20.61 m (67 ft 7 1/4 in)
Discus throw	Carl Brown	66.66 m (218 ft 8 1/4 in)	Adam Setliff≠	62.92 m (206 ft 5 in)	Doug Reynolds≠	62.71 m (205 ft 8 3/4 in)
Hammer throw	James Parker	73.04 m (239 ft 7 1/2 in)	Patrick McGrath≠	72.12 m (236 ft 7 1/4 in)	Tom Freeman≠	70.08 m (229 ft 11 in)
Javelin throw	Breaux Greer	79.37 m (260 ft 4 3/4 in)	Rob Minnitti	77.21 m (253 ft 3 3/4 in)	Joshua Johnson	76.16 m (249 ft 10 1/4 in)
Decathlon	Tom Pappas	8784 pts	Bryan Clay	8482 pts	Paul Terek	8275 pts

- ^{dq1} Tim Montgomery was originally runner-up in the men's 100 m, but was disqualified due to doping. Jon Drummond and Coby Miller were raised to second and third place.
- ^{dq2} Calvin Harrison was originally runner-up in the men's 400 m, but was disqualified due to doping. Jerome Young and Derrick Brew were raised to second and third place.
- ^{dq3} Eric Thomas originally won the men's 400 m hurdles, but was disqualified due to doping. Bershawn Jackson was elevated to the national title. Joey Woody and James Carter were raised to second and third place.
- ^{dq4} Kevin Toth originally won the men's shot put, but was disqualified due to doping. John Godina was elevated to the national title. Reese Hoffa and Adam Nelson were raised to second and third place.

=== Women track events ===
Event	Gold		Silver		Bronze	
100 meters^{[dq5]} Wind -1.1	Torri Edwards	11.13	Gail Devers	11.16	Inger Miller†	11.17
200 meters^{[dq6]} Wind +0.0	Torri Edwards	22.45	Allyson Felix	22.59	LaTasha Jenkins†	22.65
400 meters	Sanya Richards	51.01	Demetria Washington	51.54	DeeDee Trotter	51.78
800 meters	Jearl Miles Clark	1:58.84	Nicole Teter	1:59.91	Jen Toomey	2:00.12
1500 meters^{[dq7]}	Suzy Favor Hamilton	4:03.70	Tiffany McWilliams≠	4:10.85	Collette Liss≠	4:11.04
5000 meters	Marla Runyan≠	15:16.18	Shalane Flanagan≠	15:20.54	Shayne Culpepper≠	15:23.59
10,000 meters	Deena Drossin	31:28.97	Elva Dryer	31:35.74	Katie McGregor≠	31:54.78
100 m hurdles Wind -0.1	Gail Devers	12.61	Miesha McKelvy-Jones	12.62	Jenny Adams	12.68
400 m hurdles^{[dq8]}	Raasin McIntosh	54.62	Joanna Hayes	54.76	Brenda Taylor†	55.60
3000 m s'chase^{[note1]}	Briana Shook	9:44.71	Kathryn Andersen	9:47.17	Lisa Nye	9:49.14
20,000 m walk	Michelle Rohl≠	1:34:31.06	Joanne Dow	1:34:57.79	Teresa Vaill≠	1:36:38.38

=== Women field events ===
Event	Gold		Silver		Bronze	
High jump	Amy Acuff	1.95 m (6 ft 4 3/4 in)	Gwen Wentland Tisha Waller	1.92 m (6 ft 3 1/2 in)	Not awarded	
Pole vault	Stacy Dragila	4.50 m (14 ft 9 in)	Jillian Schwartz	4.40 m (14 ft 5 in)	Mary Sauer Becky Holliday	4.35 m (14 ft 3 1/4 in)
Long jump	Grace Upshaw	6.64 m (21 ft 9 1/4 in)	Rose Richmond≠	6.56 m (21 ft 6 1/4 in)w	Jenny Adams≠	6.45 m (21 ft 1 3/4 in)
Triple jump	Yuliana Pérez	14.23 m (46 ft 8 in)	Tiombe Hurd≠	13.96 m (45 ft 9 1/2 in)	Nicole Gamble≠	13.90 m (45 ft 7 in)
Shot put	Kristin Heaston	18.33 m (60 ft 1 1/2 in)	Seilala Sua≠	17.69 m (58 ft 1/4 in)	Laura Gerraughty≠	17.61 m (57 ft 9 1/4 in)
Discus throw	Aretha Hill	63.98 m (209 ft 10 3/4 in)	Suzy Powell	62.58 m (205 ft 3 3/4 in)	Seilala Sua≠	60.01 m (196 ft 10 1/2 in)
Hammer throw^{[dq9]}	Anna Mahon	69.04 m (226 ft 6 in)	Dawn Ellerbe	66.76 m (219 ft 1/4 in)	Jukina Dickerson†	65.58 m (215 ft 1 3/4 in)
Javelin throw	Erica Wheeler≠	56.85 m (186 ft 6 in)	Kim Kreiner	56.39 m (185 ft 0 in)	Denise O'Connell≠	53.38 m (175 ft 1 1/2 in)
Heptathlon	Shelia Burrell	6159 pts	Kim Schiemenz	6003 pts	Tiffany Lott-Hogan≠	5843 pts

- ^{dq5} Kelli White originally won the women's 100 m, but was disqualified due to doping. Torri Edwards was elevated to the national title. Gail Devers and Inger Miller were raised to second and third place.
- ^{dq6} Kelli White originally won the women's 200 m, but was disqualified due to doping. Torri Edwards was elevated to the national title. Allyson Felix and LaTasha Jenkins were raised to second and third place.
- ^{dq7} Regina Jacobs originally won the women's 1500 m, but was disqualified due to doping. Suzy Favor Hamilton was elevated to the national title. Tiffany McWilliams and Collette Liss were raised to second and third place.
- ^{dq8} Sandra Glover originally placed third in the women's 400 m hurdles, but was disqualified due to doping. Brenda Taylor was raised to third place.
- ^{dq9} Melissa Price originally won the women's hammer throw, but was disqualified due to doping. Anna Mahon was elevated to the national title. Dawn Ellerbe and Jukina Dickerson were raised to second and third place.
- ^{note1} The women's steeplechase was a national championship event, but was not part of the selection for the World Championships as the women's event was not added to the competition program until the 2005 edition.

== Doping ==
Doping was widespread at the 2003 USA Championships. A year after the competition, hurdler Brenda Taylor revealed she was offered banned substance modafinil and claimed that she thought she was "the only person that didn't take it". This followed the revelation that several athletes had tested positive for that drug at the championships and received bans from the sport, including Kelli White, Chryste Gaines, Sandra Glover and Eric Thomas and John McEwen. The governing body USA Track & Field was criticised for not acting more quickly in reporting the failed tests. Despite the failed drug test, the American body failed to report this to the International Association of Athletics Federations until after she had won gold medals in both the 100 m and 200 m at the World Championships.

Others to later have their national championship results be disqualified for doping were: Regina Jacobs, Damu Cherry, Melissa Price, Tim Montgomery, Calvin Harrison, Alvin Harrison and Kevin Toth. Many of these athlete bans were related to the BALCO scandal and the use of Tetrahydrogestrinone (THG).

== World Championships qualification ==
=== Automatic byes ===
A total of five American athletes were eligible for automatic byes into the 2003 World Championships in Athletics as a result of their being the defending champions from the 2001 World Championships in Athletics. All the athletes used their byes.

- Maurice Greene (sprinter): men's 100 meters
- John Godina: men's shot put
- Allen Johnson: men's 110 m hurdles
- Anjanette Kirkland: women's 100 m hurdles
- Stacy Dragila: women's pole vault

=== Non-top three selections ===
Men's shot put fourth placer Christian Cantwell would have been given the fourth national team spot due to Godina's bye, but was omitted as Kevin Toth, whose performance was later disqualified for doping, was chosen instead.

Sam Burley, sixth in the men's 800 m, was given the third national team place as the highest finisher with the "A" qualifying standard. Chris Phillips, fourth in the men's 110 m hurdles, was selected as a result of Allen Johnson's bye. Tora Harris was given the third men's high jump spot for his fifth-place finish as he was the only other athlete with the "A" standard. Low finishers in the men's discus were selected by merit of having the standard – Nick Petrucci had come fifth while Casey Malone was ninth nationally.

None of the top three finishers in the women's 5000 m had the "A" qualifying standard so Lauren Fleshman, fourth in Palo Alto, was the United States' sole World Championships representative in the event. Women's discus third placer Seilala Sua did not reach the standard so fourth place Kris Kuehl was selected instead.
