= Alejandro Suárez (runner) =

Mexican long-distance runner (born 1980)

Personal information
- Born: 30 November 1980 (age 45) Santiago de Querétaro, Mexico

Sport
- Sport: Track and field
- Event: Long-distance running
Medal record
Representing Mexico
Pan American Games
Bronze medal – third place	2007 Rio de Janeiro	10,000m

Alejandro Suárez Velázquez (born 30 November 1980) is a Mexican former long-distance runner who specializes in the 5000 metres. His personal best time is 13:18.13 minutes, achieved in June 2003 in Victoria. He clocked a sub four-minute mile (3:59.81) in Burnaby, BC in 2005.

He was a two-time winner of the North American 5K Championships, taking the 2003 and 2004 titles – he was the only man to win multiple times at the competition. He won the silver medal at the 2006 NACAC Cross Country Championships.

== International competitions ==
Year	Competition	Venue	Position	Event	Notes
Representing Mexico
2000	NACAC U-25 Championships	Monterrey, Mexico	2nd	1500m	3:48.09
2000	NACAC U-25 Championships	Monterrey, Mexico	1st	5000m	14:11.48
2001	Central American and Caribbean Championships	Guatemala City, Guatemala	2nd	5000 m	14:11.76
2002	Ibero-American Championships	Guatemala City, Guatemala	2nd	3000 m	8:10.62
2002	Ibero-American Championships	Guatemala City, Guatemala	1st	5000 m	14:16.22
2003	North American Men's Marathon Relay Championships	Akron, United States	1st	Marathon relay	2:05:30
2003	Pan American Games	Santo Domingo, Dominican Republic	4th	5000 m	13:58.19
2004	North American Men's Marathon Relay Championships	Akron, United States	1st	Marathon relay	2:05:35
2006	Central American and Caribbean Games	Cartagena, Colombia	2nd	5000 m	14:10.58
2007	Pan American Games	Rio de Janeiro, Brazil	3rd	10,000 m	28:09.95
2007	World Championships	Osaka, Japan	14th	10,000 m	28:52.19
2008	Olympic Games	Beijing, China	35th	10,000 m	29:24.78
2008	Ibero-American Championships	Iquique, Chile	2nd	5000 m	13:51.20
2009	World Championships	Berlin, Germany	37th	Marathon	2:18:55
2011	Central American and Caribbean Championships	Mayagüez, Puerto Rico	2nd	10,000 m	29:15.49
