= Melissa Price =

Melissa Price is the name of:

- Melissa Price (pole vaulter) (born 1977), American pole vaulter
- Melissa Price (politician) (born 1963), Australian politician

== See also ==
- Melissa Myerscough (born 1979), American hammer thrower; born Melissa Price
