= Alexander Greaux =

Puerto Rican steeplechaser (born 1977)

Personal information
- Born: 22 September 1977 (age 48)

Sport
- Sport: Track and field
Medal record
Representing Puerto Rico
Central American and Caribbean Games
| Gold medal – first place | 2002 San Salvador | 3000m steeplechase |
| Gold medal – first place | 2006 Cartagena | 3000m steeplechase |
| Gold medal – first place | 2010 Mayaguez | 3000m steeplechase |
| Silver medal – second place | 2002 San Salvador | 1500m |

Alexander "Alex" Greaux (born 22 September 1977) is a retired Puerto Rican steeplechaser who competed in the 2004 Summer Olympics.

== Competition record ==
| Year | Competition | Venue | Position | Event | Notes |
Representing Puerto Rico
| 1994 | CAC Junior Championships (U20) | Port of Spain, Trinidad and Tobago | 6th | 5000 m | 15:47.2 |
| 1994 | CAC Junior Championships (U20) | Port of Spain, Trinidad and Tobago | 3rd | 3000 m s'chase | 9:27.8 |
| 1995 | Pan American Junior Championships | Santiago, Chile | 1st | 3000 m s'chase | 9:10.30 |
| 1996 | CAC Junior Championships (U20) | San Salvador, El Salvador | 2nd | 3000 m s'chase | 9:25.72 |
| 1998 | Central American and Caribbean Games | Maracaibo, Venezuela | 9th | 1500 m | 3:52.12 |
| 1998 | Central American and Caribbean Games | Maracaibo, Venezuela | – | 3000 m s'chase | DNF |
| 1999 | Universiade | Palma de Mallorca, Spain | 18th (h) | 1500 m | 3:54.26 |
| 2000 | NACAC U25 Championships | Monterrey, Mexico | 3rd | 3000 m s'chase | 9:00.61 |
| 2001 | Central American and Caribbean Championships | Guatemala City, Guatemala | 3rd | 3000 m s'chase | 9:03.52 |
| 2002 | Ibero-American Championships | Guatemala City, Guatemala | 7th | 1500 m | 3:51.27 |
| 2002 | Ibero-American Championships | Guatemala City, Guatemala | 3rd | 4 × 400 m relay | 3:12.64 |
| 2002 | Central American and Caribbean Games | San Salvador, El Salvador | 2nd | 1500 m | 3:45.75 |
| 2002 | Central American and Caribbean Games | San Salvador, El Salvador | 1st | 3000 m s'chase | 8:42.39 |
| 2003 | Central American and Caribbean Championships | St. George's, Grenada | 1st | 3000 m s'chase | 8:39.68 |
| 2003 | Pan American Games | Santo Domingo, Dom. Rep. | – | 3000 m s'chase | DQ |
| 2004 | Ibero-American Championships | Huelva, Spain | 9th | 3000 m s'chase | 9:11.11 |
| 2004 | Olympic Games | Athens, Greece | 28th (h) | 3000 m s'chase | 8:33.62 |
| 2005 | Central American and Caribbean Championships | Nassau, Bahamas | 1st | 3000 m s'chase | 8:56.15 |
| 2005 | World Championships | Helsinki, Finland | 34th (h) | 3000 m s'chase | 8:39.91 |
| 2006 | Ibero-American Championships | Ponce, Puerto Rico | 1st | 3000 m s'chase | 9:12.70 |
| 2006 | Central American and Caribbean Games | Cartagena, Colombia | 1st | 3000 m s'chase | 8:44.51 |
| 2007 | Pan American Games | Rio de Janeiro, Brazil | 8th | 3000 m s'chase | 8:59.47 |
| 2008 | Central American and Caribbean Championships | Cali, Colombia | 2nd | 3000 m s'chase | 9:12.70 |
| 2010 | Ibero-American Championships | San Fernando, Spain | 6th | 3000 m s'chase | 8:55.55 |
| 2010 | Central American and Caribbean Games | Mayagüez, Puerto Rico | 1st | 3000 m s'chase | 8:56.47 |
