= Jonathan Johnson (runner) =

American middle-distance runner

Personal information
- Nationality: American
- Born: March 5, 1982 (age 44)
- Height: 1.75 m (5 ft 9 in)

Sport
- Sport: Middle-distance running
- Event: 800 metres

Achievements and titles
- Personal best: 1:44.69 min (2007)

Jonathan Johnson (born March 5, 1982) is an American middle-distance runner who specialized in the 800 metres.

He is an "Abilene native". He made his collegiate breakthrough during his first year running for the Texas Tech Red Raiders, in 2002. Indoors, he finished second in the Big 12 Conference Championship and sixth in the 2002 NCAA Division I Indoor Track and Field Championships; and outdoors he won the Big 12 Conference Championship in Columbia and finished fourth at the 2002 NCAA Division I Outdoor Track and Field Championships. In 2003 he barely ran indoors, but outdoors he won both the Big 12 Conference Championships and the NCAA Midwest Regional Championships, before winning the silver medal at the 2003 NCAA Division I Outdoor Track and Field Championships and the bronze medal at the 2003 USA Outdoor Track and Field Championships.

In 2004 he won back-to-back-to-back titles at the Big 12 Conference Championships, the NCAA Midwest Regional Championships and the 2004 United States Olympic trials. This qualified him for the 2004 Summer Olympics, and his Olympic trial time of 1:44.77 minutes was a personal best. Travelling to Europe, he competed at the Weltklasse meet almost three weeks ahead of the Games, placing lowly. In the Olympic 800 metres, he finished second in his initial heat, but was knocked out in the semi-final. He was the first-ever Olympian for Texas Tech.

His 2005 season was a step down as he finished fifth at the Big 12 Indoor Championship and sixth at the 2005 NCAA Division I Indoor Track and Field Championships. Although he won the Big 12 Conference Championship outdoors, in Manhattan, Kansas while recording 1:44.86 minutes to come close to his personal best, he proceeded to place sixth at the 2005 NCAA Division I Outdoor Track and Field Championships and failed to reach the final at the 2005 USA Outdoor Track and Field Championships. In Europe, he competed at the London Grand Prix, DN-Galan, Bislett Games and Meeting de Liege. His collegiate career ended in 2005

2006 saw him compete more in Europe, as well as Kingston, Jamaica, but he did not progress past the heats at the 2006 USA Outdoor Track and Field Championships. He bounced back to finish fourth at the 2007 USA Outdoor Track and Field Championships, continuing to compete in Europe as well as Osaka. The most notable outing was the Night of Athletics meet in Heusden-Zolder, where Johnson achieved his lifetime best of 1:44.69 minutes. By that time, he had relocated to Orlando, Florida to train with Team Reebook. 2008 saw Johnson go to Jamaica, Brazil and Europe as well as finishing eighth at the 2008 United States Olympic trials. He failed to reach the final at either the 2009 USA Outdoor Track and Field Championships or the 2010 USA Indoor Track and Field Championships.

== See also ==
- NCAA Division I Outdoor Track and Field Championships – Men's 800 meter run
