= Dolores Pedrares =

Spanish hammer thrower

Personal information
- Born: 17 January 1973 (age 53) Tuy, Pontevedra, Spain

Sport
- Sport: Track and field

María Dolores Pedrares Alonso (born 17 January 1973) is a retired female hammer thrower from Spain. She set her personal best (67.14 metres) on 26 June 2004 at a meet in Valladolid. Pedrares is a four-time national champion in the women's hammer throw event with straight victories from 1999 to 2002.

== Competition record ==
Year	Competition	Venue	Position	Notes
Representing Spain
1998	Ibero-American Championships	Lisbon, Portugal	6th	54.78 m
1998	European Championships	Budapest, Hungary	23rd (q)	54.34 m
1999	Universiade	Palma de Mallorca, Spain	21st (q)	55.61 m
1999	World Championships	Seville, Spain	19th (q)	57.66 m
2000	Ibero-American Championships	Rio de Janeiro, Brazil	1st	61.39 m
2001	Universiade	Beijing, China	19th (q)	57.79 m
2001	Mediterranean Games	Radès, Tunisia	9th	57.27 m
2002	Ibero-American Championships	Guatemala City, Guatemala	3rd	61.83 m
2002	European Championships	Munich, Germany	28th (q)	59.93 m
2004	Ibero-American Championships	Huelva, Spain	10th	58.97 m
2005	Mediterranean Games	Almería, Spain	11th	61.48 m
2006	Ibero-American Championships	Ponce, Puerto Rico	3rd	64.52 m
2006	European Championships	Gothenburg, Sweden	27th (q)	61.69 m
