= Édgar Hernández (race walker) =

Mexican racewalker

Edgar Hernández (born 8 June 1977) is a male race walker from Mexico. He won the bronze medal in the 50 km distance at the 2001 World Championships in Edmonton.

== Achievements ==
Year	Competition	Venue	Position	Event	Notes
Representing Mexico
2000	NACAC U-25 Championships	Monterrey, Mexico	1st	20,000m walk	1:25:36.67
2001	Pan American Race Walking Cup	Cuenca, Ecuador	1st	50 km	4:05:24
2001	World Championships	Edmonton, Canada	3rd	50 km	3:46:12
