= Madaí Pérez =

Mexican long-distance runner

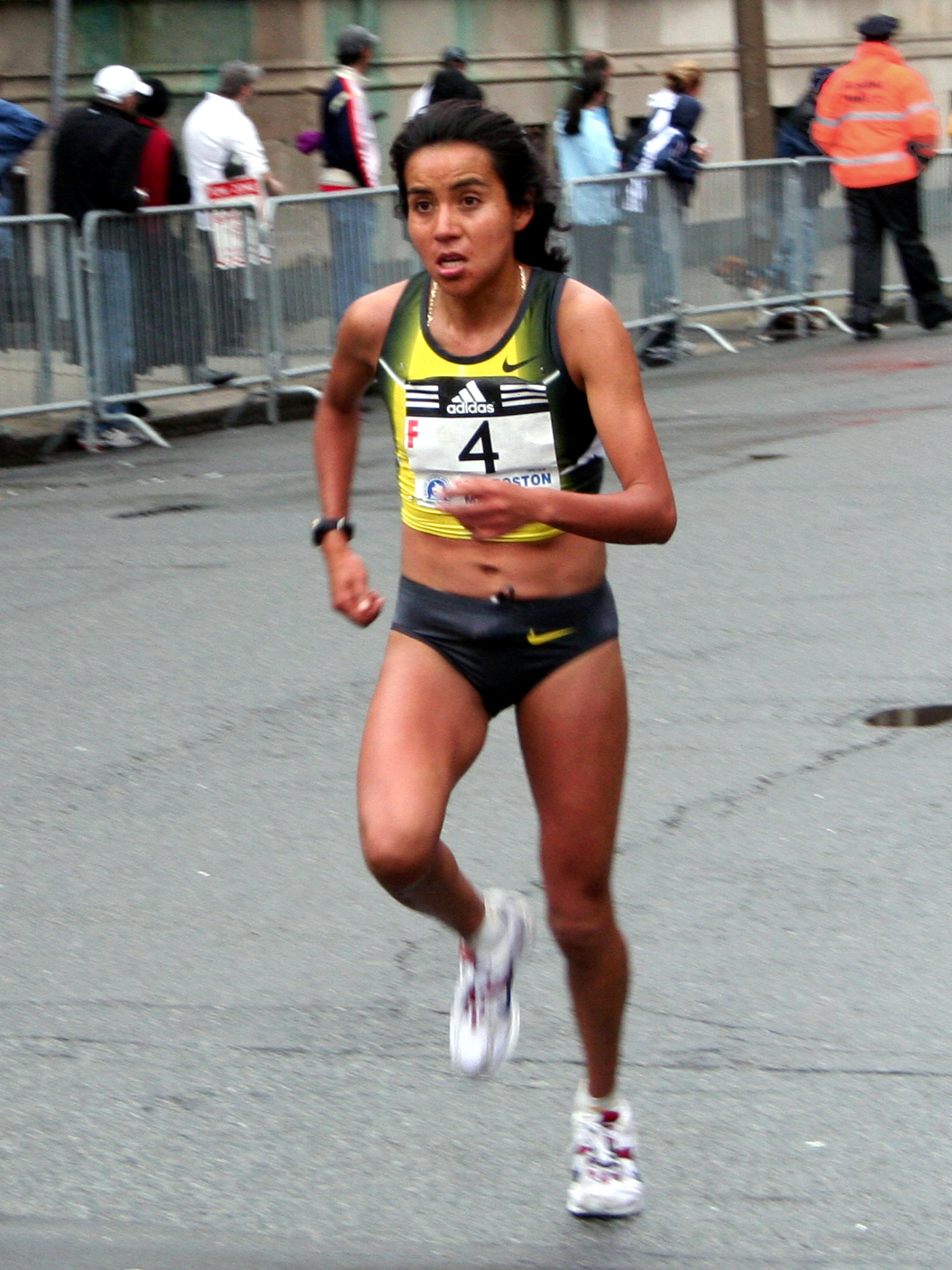
- Madaí Pérez at the 2007 Boston Marathon

Personal information
- Born: 2 February 1980 (age 46) Tlaxcala City, Tlaxcala, Mexico
- Height: 1.58 m (5 ft 2 in)
- Weight: 46 kg (101 lb)

Sport
- Country: Mexico
- Sport: Athletics
- Events: Marathon, Half marathon
Medal record
Women's track and field
Representing Mexico
Pan American Games
Silver medal – second place	2011 Guadalajara	Marathon
Bronze medal – third place	2003 Santo Domingo	10,000m
CAC Junior Championships (U20)
Gold medal – first place	1998 George Town	5000 m

Madaí Pérez Carrillo (born 2 February 1980 in Tlaxcala) is a Mexican long-distance runner. She represented Mexico in the marathon at the 2008 and 2012 Summer Olympics and 2016 Summer Olympics.

== Career ==
Her first full marathon race was the 2003 Chicago Marathon, where she finished twelfth in 2:31:34. She finished fifth over 10,000 metres at the 2003 Pan American Games. She won the Bolder Boulder 10K race in 2004, and also won the Guadalajara Half Marathon that year, in the first of three consecutive wins. In 2005, she finished eleventh in the marathon at the World Championships in a personal best time of 2:26:50, and sixth at the 2005 IAAF World Half Marathon Championships. In 2006, she finished fourth at the Chicago Marathon in a new Mexican record time of 2:22:59. In the 2007 Boston Marathon she came in third (2:30:16). At the 2007 Athletics World Championships in Osaka, Japan she finished in 15th position, thus being the best female Latin American participant (2:35:17). The old record belonged to Adriana Fernández.

At the 2008 Payton Jordan Cardinal Invitation at Stanford she finished sixth in the 10,000 meters. with a personal best of 31:30:23. In Ixtapa, Mexico on 11 May 2008, she qualified for the Olympic Marathon in a 30 km trial, finishing in first position (1:45:05), followed by Dulce Maria Rodriguez and Patricia Retiz who formed part of the team for Beijing. On 7 June, Perez finished six seconds behind winner Hilda Kibet in 32:49 for second place at the New York Mini 10K. In her last competition on 27 July 2008 before the Olympic Games, Madai finished second in the New York Half Marathon behind Catherine Ndereba and improved her personal best to 1:10:26. On 17 August 2008, Madaí finished 19th on the Olympic Marathon in Beijing – her time was 2:31:47.

Since 2002 Pérez has been coached by Germán Silva, champion of the 1994-1995 New York City Marathon. She is married to fellow marathon runner Odilón Cuahutle, who is her coach now, and they have a son Kenjiro. She had her second child, Kenia, in May 2009. She returned successfully to participate in a few competitions at the end of 2009 in Mexico. She ran her PR in the New York Half Marathon on 21 March, a time of 1:09:45. She finished in third position. In April she ran the 2010 Boston Marathon however, due to an infection, she wasn't able to run a good time.

Madai returned to compete in the New York City Marathon on 7 November and finished in ninth place with a time of 2:29:53, a few minutes behind the winner. She defeated Kara Goucher to win the Arizona Half Marathon in January 2011 with a time of 1:11:49.

Madai ran the Half Marathon of Guadalajara on 20 February in a time of 1:13:26 (3rd) and one month later participated in the Half Marathon of New York (1:11:12) in 10th place. Qualifying for the Pan American Games in October, she ran the London Marathon on 17 April in 2:27:02. Two months later she participated in the Father's Day Half Marathon in Puebla, obtaining a victory. Consecutively Madai ran two races in the U.S. On 4 July she participated in the Peachtree 10k, one of the largest 10ks in the world, running a time of 32:57 (7th place) and 30 July she came in at fourth place (38:33). She continued preparing herself for the Pan American Games in Veracruz and obtained an easy victory in the Half Marathon of Atlas Colomos on 4 September. At the Pan American Games, Madai won the silver medal in the marathon.

In March 2012, she competed in the NY City Half Marathon running 1:10 her second fastest time. On 20 April at the Mt. SAC Relays she participated in the 5000 metres, finishing second with a PB of 15:41.

Before her specific preparation for the London Olympics she ran the 10000 metres in the Payton Jordan Invitational in Stanford finishing with a time of 32:27. Unfortunately Madai had to withdraw from the Olympics due to an injury.

She made her come-back in the spring of 2013, achieving a 5th-place finish in the NY City Half Marathon (1:10:05), followed by a 7th-place finish (2:28:59) in the Boston Marathon. In the summer of 2013 she ran the Bolder Boulder competition, and won 2nd place with her team for Mexico, in July in the Peachtree 10k, she came in sixth with 32:39. She represented Mexico in 2013 at the World Championships Athletics in Moscow, finishing 7th in a hot marathon with 2:34:23. During her preparation for the Hamburg Marathon she got injured and had to retire, she's in rehabilitation. After surgery she ran the half marathon of NY in March 2016 finishing in 12th position in 1:12:54. In the Hamburg marathon in April 2016 she qualified for her third Olympics. Her preparation for the Rio Olympics was far from perfect and she wasn't able to improve her result of the Beijing Olympics (19th), crossing the finish in 32nd place. In 2017 she definitively showed in the Chicago marathon she is still a tough competitor finishing with a 2:24:44 the Chicago marathon in 4th place. In the Hamburg marathon of 2019 with a 6th place she ran 2:30:04 and in October in Chicago a 2:31:44. In her own country she was the winner in several shorter races, like in the Half marathon of Guadalajara in Autumn.

== Achievements ==
Year	Competition	Venue	Position	Event	Notes
Representing Mexico
1998	Central American and Caribbean; Junior Championships (U20)	Georgetown, Cayman Islands	1st	5000 m	17:41.88
1999	Pan American Junior Championships	Tampa, United States	2nd	3000 m	9:38.44
1999	Pan American Junior Championships	Tampa, United States	1st	5000 m	16:50.77
1999	Pan American Games	Winnipeg, Canada	–	10,000 m	DNF
2000	NACAC U-25 Championships	Monterrey, Mexico	4th	1500m	4:35.67
2000	NACAC U-25 Championships	Monterrey, Mexico	1st	Half marathon	1:25:02
2002	NACAC U-25 Championships	San Antonio, Texas, United States	1st	Half marathon	1:16:05
2003	Pan American Games	Santo Domingo, Dominican Republic	3rd	10,000 m	33:56.17
2005	World Championships	Helsinki, Finland	11th	Marathon	2:26:50
2005	World Half Marathon Championships	Edmonton, Canada	6th	Half marathon	1:10:37
2006	Central American and Caribbean Games	Cartagena, Colombia	3rd	5000 m	16:19.38
2007	World Championships	Osaka, Japan	15th	Marathon	2:35:17
2008	Olympic Games	Beijing, PR China	19th	Marathon	2:31:47
2011	Pan American Games	Guadalajara, Mexico	2nd	Marathon	2:38:03
2013	Boston Marathon	Boston, Massachusetts	7o	Marathon	2:28:59
2013	World Championships	Moscow, Russia	7th	Marathon	2:34:23 SB
