= Heber Viera =

Uruguayan sprinter (born 1979)

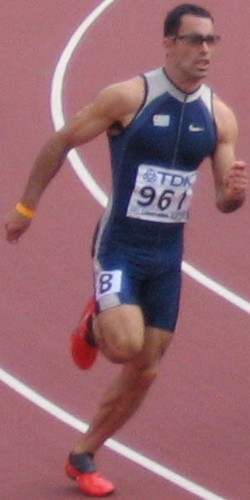
- Viera at the 2005 World Championships

Personal information
- Born: April 29, 1979 (age 47) Salto, Uruguay

Sport
- Sport: Track and field
Medal record
Representing Uruguay
South American Games
Silver medal – second place	1998 Cuenca	200 m

Heber Williams Viera da Silva (born April 29, 1979) is a Uruguayan sprinter who has been prominent in South American sprints since the turn of the century. He competed at the Summer Olympics in 2000, 2004 and 2008, being knocked out in the heats each time.

Viera represented Uruguay at the 2008 Summer Olympics in Beijing. He competed at the 200 metres and placed sixth in his first round heat in a time of 20.93 seconds, which was not enough to advance to the second round.

== Competition record ==
Year	Competition	Venue	Position	Event	Notes
Representing Uruguay
1996	South American Junior Championships	Bucaramanga, Colombia	3rd	100 m	10.5
1996	South American Junior Championships	Bucaramanga, Colombia	2nd	200 m	20.9 (w)
1996	South American Junior Championships	Bucaramanga, Colombia	6th	4 × 400 m relay	3:28.3
1997	South American Championships	Mar del Plata, Argentina	8th	100 m	10.77
1997	Pan American Junior Championships	San Carlos, Uruguay	8th	200 m	22.20
1997	South American Junior Championships	San Carlos, Uruguay	2nd	100 m	11.04
1997	South American Junior Championships	San Carlos, Uruguay	1st	200 m	21.57
1997	South American Junior Championships	San Carlos, Uruguay	3rd	4 × 100 m relay	42.58
1998	South American Junior Championships	Córdoba, Argentina	1st	200 m	21.33 (w)
1998	South American Junior Championships	Córdoba, Argentina	5th	4 × 100 m relay	42.11
1998	World Junior Championships	Annecy, France	21st (qf)	200 m	21.58
1998	South American Games	Cuenca, Ecuador	4th	100 m	10.53
1998	South American Games	Cuenca, Ecuador	2nd	200 m	21.0
1999	South American Championships	Bogotá, Colombia	3rd	100 m	10.15
1999	South American Championships	Bogotá, Colombia	3rd	200 m	20.76 (w)
1999	South American Championships	Bogotá, Colombia	4th	4 × 100 m relay	40.14
1999	Pan American Games	Winnipeg, Canada	8th	200 m	21.19
1999	World Championships	Seville, Spain	–	200 m	DQ
2000	Ibero-American Championships	Rio de Janeiro, Brazil	6th	100 m	10.65
2000	Ibero-American Championships	Rio de Janeiro, Brazil	4th	200 m	21.19
2000	Olympic Games	Sydney, Australia	55th (h)	100 m	10.54
2000	Olympic Games	Sydney, Australia	30th (qf)	200 m	20.97
2001	World Indoor Championships	Lisbon, Portugal	15th (h)	200 m	21.55
2001	South American Championships	Manaus, Brazil	3rd	100 m	10.37
2001	South American Championships	Manaus, Brazil	2nd	200 m	20.68
2001	South American Championships	Manaus, Brazil	3rd	4 × 100 m relay	40.34
2001	World Championships	Edmonton, Canada	24th (qf)	200 m	20.83
2002	Ibero-American Championships	Guatemala City, Guatemala	1st	100 m	10.08 (w)
2002	Ibero-American Championships	Guatemala City, Guatemala	2nd	200 m	20.46
2003	World Indoor Championships	Birmingham, United Kingdom	–	200 m	DQ
2003	South American Championships	Barquisimeto, Venezuela	2nd	100 m	10.33
2003	South American Championships	Barquisimeto, Venezuela	1st	200 m	20.60
2003	Pan American Games	Santo Domingo, Dominican Republic	5th	200 m	20.85
2003	World Championships	Paris, France	32nd (h)	200 m	20.87
2004	World Indoor Championships	Budapest, Hungary	18th (h)	200 m	21.36
2004	Ibero-American Championships	Huelva, Spain	3rd	200 m	21.30
2004	Olympic Games	Athens, Greece	35th (h)	200 m	20.94
2005	South American Championships	Cali, Colombia	3rd	100 m	10.43
2005	South American Championships	Cali, Colombia	2nd	200 m	20.62 (w)
2005	World Championships	Helsinki, Finland	48th (h)	200 m	21.71
2006	Ibero-American Championships	Ponce, Puerto Rico	3rd	100 m	10.45
2006	Ibero-American Championships	Ponce, Puerto Rico	2nd	200 m	20.80
2006	South American Championships	Tunja, Colombia	–	100 m	DQ
2006	South American Championships	Tunja, Colombia	3rd	200 m	21.10
2007	South American Championships	São Paulo, Brazil	2nd	200 m	20.59
2007	Pan American Games	Rio de Janeiro, Brazil	19th (h)	200 m	21.29
2008	Ibero-American Championships	Iquique, Chile	7th	100 m	10.94
2008	Ibero-American Championships	Iquique, Chile	11th (h)	200 m	21.74
2008	Olympic Games	Beijing, China	34th (h)	200 m	20.93
2011	South American Championships	Buenos Aires, Argentina	14th (h)	100 m	11.17
2011	South American Championships	Buenos Aires, Argentina	14th (h)	200 m	22.45

== Personal bests ==
- 100 metres - 10.08 (2002)
- 200 metres - 20.46 (2002)
