= Tanya Oxley =

Barbadian sprinter

Personal information
- Born: 13 May 1979 (age 47)
Medal record
Women's Athletics
Representing Barbados
Pan American Games
Bronze medal – third place	1999 Winnipeg	4x400m relay
CAC Junior Championships (U20)
Bronze medal – third place	1996 San Salvador	200 m
Bronze medal – third place	1996 San Salvador	4x400 m relay
CARIFTA Games Junior (U20)
Gold medal – first place	1997 Bridgetown	400m
Bronze medal – third place	1995 George Town	4x400m relay

Tanya Oxley (born 13 May 1979) is a retired female track and field sprinter from Barbados.

== Career ==
She represented her native country at the 2000 Summer Olympics in Sydney, Australia. She won a bronze medal in the women's 4x400 metres relay at the 1999 Pan American Games, alongside Melissa Straker, Andrea Blackett, and Joanne Durant.

== Personal life ==
She is currently employed at The Berkeley Institute (Bermuda).

== Achievements ==
Year	Competition	Venue	Position	Event	Notes
Representing Barbados
1994	CARIFTA Games (U-17)	Bridgetown, Barbados	8th	400 m	58.39
1995	CARIFTA Games (U-17)	George Town, Cayman Islands	7th	100 m	12.22 (0.2 m/s)
1995	CARIFTA Games (U-17)	George Town, Cayman Islands	5th	200 m	24.52 (0.2 m/s)
1995	CARIFTA Games (U-20)	George Town, Cayman Islands	3rd	4 × 400 m relay	3:40.16
1996	Central American and Caribbean Junior Championships (U-20)	San Salvador, El Salvador	7th	100 m	12.20 (0.7 m/s)
1996	Central American and Caribbean Junior Championships (U-20)	San Salvador, El Salvador	3rd	200 m	24.56 (0.6 m/s)
1996	Central American and Caribbean Junior Championships (U-20)	San Salvador, El Salvador	3rd	4 × 400 m relay	3:48.76
1996	World Junior Championships	Sydney, Australia	35th (h)	200m	24.92 (wind: -1.1 m/s)
1997	CARIFTA Games (U-20)	Bridgetown, Barbados	1st	400 m	54.64
1999	Central American and Caribbean Championships	Bridgetown, Barbados	3rd	4 × 100 m relay	46.78
1999	Central American and Caribbean Championships	Bridgetown, Barbados	2nd	4 × 400 m relay	3:32.40
1999	Pan American Games	Winnipeg, Canada	9th (h)	200 m	23.90
1999	Pan American Games	Winnipeg, Canada	3rd	4 × 400 m relay	3:30.72
2000	NACAC U-25 Championships	Monterrey, Mexico	7th	200m	25.41 (wind: -3.1 m/s)
2000	NACAC U-25 Championships	Monterrey, Mexico	2nd	400m	52.92
2000	NACAC U-25 Championships	Monterrey, Mexico	1st^{†}	4 × 400 m relay	3:36.58^{†}
2000	Olympic Games	Sydney, Australia	42nd (h)	400 m	54.22
2000	Olympic Games	Sydney, Australia	11th (h)	4 × 400 m relay	3:30.83 SB

^{†}: Most probable, but relay team members could not be retrieved.
