= Rogelio Pizarro =

Spanish track and field athlete

Personal information
- Born: August 23, 1979 (age 47)

Sport
- Sport: Track and field

Rogelio Manuel Pizarro Domenech (born August 23, 1979) is a retired male track and field athlete, who competed in the sprints events during his career. He represented his native country at the 2000 Summer Olympics, where he was eliminated in the first round of the men's 4×100 metres relay, alongside Jorge Richardson, Osvaldo Nieves and Félix Omar Fernández. Pizarro ran the second leg in the heat 4 race.

== Achievements ==
Year	Competition	Venue	Position	Event	Notes
Representing Puerto Rico
2000	NACAC U-25 Championships	Monterrey, Mexico	4th	100m	11.04 (wind: -2.5 m/s)
2000	NACAC U-25 Championships	Monterrey, Mexico	1st^{†}	4 × 100 m relay	40.45^{†}
2002	NACAC U-25 Championships	San Antonio, Texas, United States	7th	4 × 100 m relay	40.66
2002	NACAC U-25 Championships	San Antonio, Texas, United States	4th	4 × 400 m relay	3:12.46
2002	Central American and Caribbean Games	San Salvador, El Salvador	—	4 × 100 m relay	DNF

^{†}: Most probable, but relay team members could not be retrieved.
