= Errol Thurton =

Belizean sprinter

Errol Thurton Sr.
Personal information
- Born: 1944 (age 81–82) Belize

Sport
- Sport: Sprinting
- Event: 400 metres

Errol Thurton (born 1944) is a Belizean sprinter. He competed in the men's 400 metres at the 1976 Summer Olympics.

Thurton was an All-American sprinter for the Manhattan Jaspers track and field team, finishing 4th in the 4 × 400 m relay at the 1976 NCAA Division I Indoor Track and Field Championships.
