= Félix Omar Fernández =

Puerto Rican sprinter

Personal information
- Born: July 22, 1976 (age 50) Río Piedras, Puerto Rico

Sport
- Sport: Track and field

Félix Omar Fernández Rodríguez (born July 22, 1976) is a retired Puerto Rican track and field athlete. He competed in the sprints events during his career. He competed for Puerto Rico at the 2000 Summer Olympics, where he was eliminated in the first round of the men's 4×100 metres relay, alongside Osvaldo Nieves, Rogelio Pizarro and Jorge Richardson. Fernández ran the fourth and last leg.
