= Steve Augustine =

British athletics competitor

Steve Augustine (born 11 March 1977 in Road Town, Tortola) is a sprinter who represented the British Virgin Islands.

Augustine represented British Virgin Islands at the Summer Olympics when he competed in the 1996 Summer Olympics in Atlanta, he entered the 4x400 metres relay the team finished 6th in the heat so didn't qualify for the next round.
