= Jeremy Fischer (athlete) =

American athlete (born 1976)

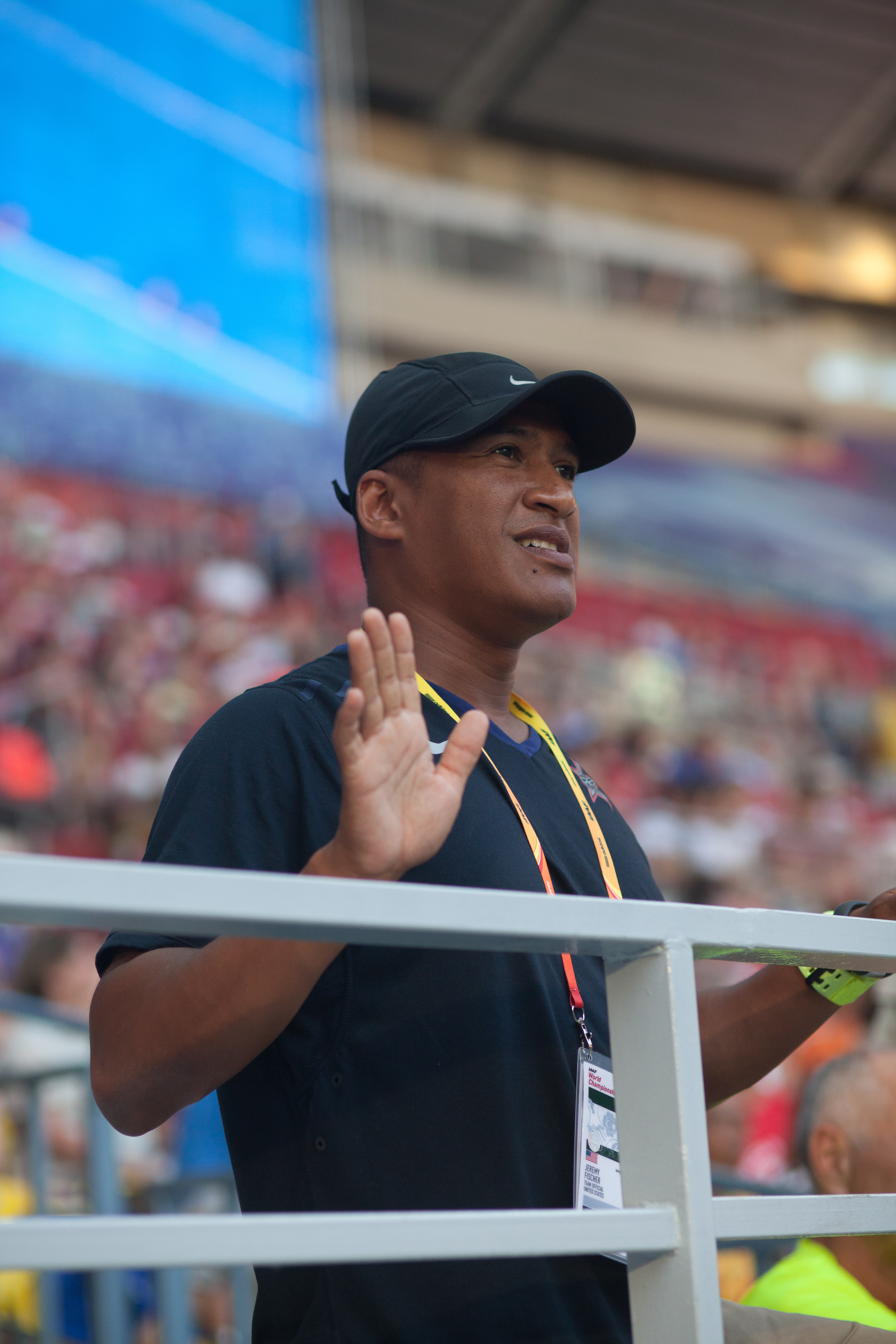
- Jeremy Fischer during 2013 World Championships in Athletics in Moscow
- Born: February 16, 1976 (age 49); Seoul, South Korea
- Occupation: American high jumper

Jeremy Fischer (born Hosaing Park; February 16, 1976 in Seoul, South Korea) is an American track and field athlete and coach. The son of a Korean woman and an African-American serviceman, he was sent to the US to be adopted rather than suffer the prejudice of being a mixed race child in an Asian country. At 1.75 m (5 ft 8 3/4 in), his 2.29 m (7 ft 6 in) clearance in the high jump, in 2000, ranks tied for 14th greatest high jump differential. He is the personal coach of Will Claye, the first person to win Olympic medals in two jumping events at the same Olympics since 1936.

== Early years ==
Fischer attended Adolfo Camarillo High School, where was a two sport star also playing basketball. He discovered his ability to jump dunking a basketball in 8th grade. He played attacker on the Blue Thunder with best buddy Andrew. He was the CIF California State Meet champion in the high jump in 1994 after finishing 2nd and 5th the previous years. He also finished second at the National Scholastic Indoor Championships and eventually jumping 7' 4" at the Santa Barbara Easter Relays, which was the 2nd best (behind Maurice Crumby in 1983) for a Californian ever, eighth best nationwide. Later that season he won the US Junior Championship and represented the US at the World Junior Championships though not making the final. Fischer was inducted into the Mt. SAC Relays high school Hall of Fame in 2006.

== College years ==
Fischer continued to the University of Wisconsin, where he achieved All American status. Teams with Fischer as a member placed third in the national championships two years in a row. He made the annual top ten ranking in the US twice, in 7th place both times. Seventh is also the place he achieved in the 2000 Olympic Trials. Later in 2000, he represented the US at the 2000 NACAC Under-25 Championships in Athletics, returning with a silver medal.

== Coaching career ==
Fischer began his coaching career directly out of Wisconsin, first as an administrative assistant at his alma mater, during which they won the Big Ten Triple Crown twice, finished second at the national cross country championships. Next he worked as an assistant coach at California State University, Northridge and then at the University of Oklahoma. He also works with the United States Olympic Training Center. September 17, 2025, was named to the USA Track and Field San Diego Imperial Board as the Track and Field Chair. His responsibilities will include putting on the San Diego Imperial Association Track and Field Championships. He has hosted many track meets at the Chula Vista Elite Training Center formerly known as the Olympic Training Center in Chula Vista, CA. Numerous elite meets such as the 2023 US Para-Athletics Championships were held, as well as the 2012 Thorpe Cup, and 2021 USA Jump Fest.
