= Osvaldo Nieves =

Puerto Rican Olympian sprinter

Osvaldo Nieves Morales (born March 20, 1980) is a retired male track and field athlete, who competed in the sprints events during his career. He competed for his native country Puerto Rico at the 2000 Summer Olympics, where he was eliminated in the first round of the men's 4×100 metres relay, alongside Jorge Richardson, Rogelio Pizarro and Félix Omar Fernández. Nieves ran the first leg in the race.

== Achievements ==
Year	Competition	Venue	Position	Event	Notes
Representing Puerto Rico
2000	NACAC U-25 Championships	Monterrey, Mexico	7th	200m	22.13 (wind: -3.9 m/s)
2000	NACAC U-25 Championships	Monterrey, Mexico	1st^{†}	4×100m relay	40.45^{†}
2002	NACAC U-25 Championships	San Antonio, Texas, United States	4th (h)	200m	21.49 (wind: +1.6 m/s)
2002	NACAC U-25 Championships	San Antonio, Texas, United States	7th	4×100m relay	40.66
2002	Central American and Caribbean Games	San Salvador, El Salvador	4th (h)	200m	21.49 (wind: 0.4 m/s)
2002	Central American and Caribbean Games	San Salvador, El Salvador	—	4×100m relay	DNF

^{†}: Most probable, but relay team members could not be retrieved.
