= Jenny Adams =

American track and field athlete

Personal information
- Born: July 8, 1978 (age 47) Tomball, Texas, United States

Sport
- Sport: Track and field
- Club: Houston Cougars

Jenny Adams (born July 8, 1978) is an American former track and field athlete who specialized in the 100 metres hurdles.

Adams was an All-American hurdler and jumper for the Houston Cougars track and field team, winning the long jump at the 2000 NCAA Division I Outdoor Track and Field Championships and 2001 NCAA Division I Indoor Track and Field Championships.

At the 2001 World Championships in Edmonton, Alberta, Canada, she achieved her personal best time (12.63 seconds) and competed in the long jump as well. Her personal best in that event is 6.64 m (21 ft 9 1/4 in).

== International competitions ==
Year	Competition	Venue	Position	Event	Notes
Representing the United States
2000	NACAC U-25 Championships	Monterrey, Mexico	1st	100 m hurdles	13.54 (wind: -1.8 m/s)
2000	NACAC U-25 Championships	Monterrey, Mexico	1st	Long jump	6.34m (wind: +2.0 m/s)
2001	World Championships	Edmonton, Alberta, Canada	5th	100 m hurdles	12.63 (wind: +2.0 m/s)
2001	World Championships	Edmonton, Alberta, Canada	12th (q)	Long jump	6.48m
2001	Goodwill Games	Brisbane, Australia	2nd	100 m hurdles	12.87
2002	IAAF Grand Prix Final	Paris, France	5th	100 m hurdles	12.88 (wind: +0.1 m/s)
2003	World Championships	Paris, France	6th	100 m hurdles	12.77 (wind: -0.2 m/s)
2003	World Athletics Final	Monte Carlo, Monaco	4th	100 m hurdles	12.78 (wind: +1.3 m/s)
2004	World Athletics Final	Monte Carlo, Monaco	2nd	100 m hurdles	12.68 (wind: +1.0 m/s)
