= 2000 NACAC Under-25 Championships in Athletics =

I NACAC Under-25 Championships in Athletics
- Dates: August 3–5
- Host city: Monterrey, Mexico
- Venue: Universidad Autónoma de Nuevo León
- Level: U-25
- Events: 45
- Participation: 184 athletes from 21 nations

The 1st NACAC Under-25 Championships in Athletics were held in Monterrey, Nuevo León, Mexico on August 3–5, 2000. This year and in 2002 the event was open for athletes younger than 25 years.

== Medal summary ==
Medal winners are published. Complete results can be found on the AtletismoCR, on the CFPI, and the Nevis Amateur Athletic Association websites.

=== Men ===
Event	Gold		Silver		Bronze	
100 metres	Kim Collins (SKN)	10.46	Nicolas Macrozonaris (CAN)	10.75	Dion Crabbe (IVB)	10.82
200 metres	Kim Collins (SKN)	20.53	Dominic Demeritte (BAH)	20.85	Dion Crabbe (IVB)	21.27
400 metres	Fabian Rollins (BAR)	46.01	Chris Brown (BAH)	46.02	David Coombs (JAM)	46.86
800 metres	Milton Browne (BAR)	1:51.02	Martin Cluff (CAN)	1:51.20	Heleodoro Navarro (MEX)	1:52.12
1500 metres	Jonathon Riley (USA)	3:45.48	Alejandro Suárez (MEX)	3:48.09	Luis Arias (MEX)	3:49.79
5000 metres	Alejandro Suárez (MEX)	14:11.48	Jason Balkman (USA)	14:16.44	Nathan Nutter (USA)	14:26.25
10,000 metres	David Galindo (MEX)	31:03.25	Jonathan Morales (MEX)	31:48.66	Sergio de León (GUA)	32:05.08
Half Marathon	Hugo Romero (MEX)	1:08:59	Ariel Aguirre (MEX)	1:09:36	Francisco Mondragón (MEX)	1:10:15
3000 metres steeplechase	Tom Chorny (USA)	8:47.98	Chuck Sloan (USA)	8:48.60	Alex Greaux (PUR)	9:00.61
110 metres hurdles	Aubrey Herring (USA)	13.96	Andrew Lissade (CAN)	13.98	Randy Gillon (ATG)	14.33
400 metres hurdles	Nick Stewart (CAN)	50.06	Jeff Ellis (CAN)	50.76	Ryan Clarke (JAM)	50.94
High jump	Jesse Lipscombe (CAN)	2.20m	Jeremy Fischer (USA)	2.15m	Damon Thompson (BAR)	2.05m
Pole vault	Russ Buller (USA)	5.40m	Robison Pratt (MEX)	5.20m		
Long jump	Miguel Pate (USA)	7.68m	Aundre Edwards (JAM)	7.53m	Cleavon Dillon (TRI)	7.45m
Triple jump	Allen Mortimer (BAH)	15.74m w	Gregory Hughes (BAR)	15.48m	Gerardo Martínez (MEX)	15.43m w
Shot put	John Davis (USA)	19.50m	Jarred Rome (USA)	19.50m	Dave Stoute (TRI)	18.91m
Discus throw	Casey Malone (USA)	59.19m	Jarred Rome (USA)	58.08m	Juan Martínez (MEX)	41.19m
Hammer throw	Kevin Mannon (USA)	67.72m	Raúl Rivera (GUA)	59.57m	Carlos Valencia (MEX)	57.27m
Javelin throw	Brian Kollar (USA)	71.51m	Javier Ugarte (NCA)	61.58m	Gustavo Siller (MEX)	59.05m
Decathlon	Maurice Smith (JAM)	7090 pts	Juan Tenorio (MEX)	5853 pts	Alejandro Escalona (MEX)	5778 pts
20 Kilometres Road Walk	Édgar Hernández (MEX)	1:25:37	Jesús Sánchez (MEX)	1:29:31	John Nunn (USA)	1:45:38
4 × 100 metres relay	Puerto Rico	40.45				
4 × 400 metres relay	Barbados	3:10.76	Mexico	3:13.66	Canada	3:25.33

=== Women ===
Event	Gold		Silver		Bronze	
100 metres	Angela Williams (USA)	11.57	Aleen Bailey (JAM)	11.66	Cydonie Mothersill (CAY)	11.83
200 metres	Aleen Bailey (JAM)	23.47	Cydonie Mothersill (CAY)	23.72	Christine Amertil (BAH)	24.05
400 metres	Christine Amertil (BAH)	52.65	Tanya Oxley (BAR)	52.92	Tonique Williams (BAH)	53.05
800 metres	Elizabeth Diaz (USA)	2:03.59	Ashley Wysong (USA)	2:04.92	Sheena Gooding (BAR)	2:12.92
1500 metres	Susan Taylor (USA)	4:20.31	Margarita Tapia (MEX)	4:27.45	Janill Williams (ATG)	4:32.34
5000 metres	Margarita Tapia (MEX)	16:51.57	Janill Williams (ATG)	18:16.78	Guadalupe García (MEX)	18:38.48
10,000 metres	Guadalupe García (MEX)	38:59.43	Kary Tripp (MEX)	39:01.36		
Half Marathon	Madai Pérez (MEX)	1:25:02				
100 metres hurdles	Jenny Adams (USA)	13.54	Dalanda Jackson (USA)	13.87	Angela Whyte (CAN)	14.14
400 metres hurdles	Tawa Babatunde (CAN)	57.99	Deniece Bell (CAN)	58.30	Sheena Johnson (USA)	59.81
High jump	Celly Martínez (MEX)	1.75m	Yunuen Alejandri (MEX)	1.60m		
Pole vault	Tracy O'Hara (USA)	4.00m	Dana Ellis (CAN)	3.80m	Kristin Hagel (CAN)	3.70m
Long jump	Jenny Adams (USA)	6.34m	Tisha Parker (USA)	6.32m w	Ayesha Maycock (BAR)	6.15m w
Triple jump	Nicole Gamble (USA)	13.27m	Dahlia Ingram (USA)	12.72m	Mónica Martínez (MEX)	11.98m
Shot put	Tina McDonald (CAN)	16.07m	Marie-Josée LeJour (CAN)	14.83m	Melissa Gibbons (JAM)	14.76m
Discus throw	Tina McDonald (CAN)	49.23m	Melissa Gibbons (JAM)	48.99m	Marie-Josée LeJour (CAN)	46.41m
Hammer throw	Melissa Price (USA)	61.83m	Maureen Griffin (USA)	60.47m	Violeta Guzmán (MEX)	58.84m
Javelin throw	Kendra Wecker (USA)	53.18m	Ana Gutiérrez (MEX)	47.28m		
Heptathlon	Tracye Lawyer (USA)	5557 pts	Christi Smith (USA)	5180 pts	Rocío González (MEX)	4065 pts
20 Kilometres Road Walk	Victoria Palacios (MEX)	1:39:02	Sarah Stevenson (USA)	1:39:55	Abigail Sáenz (MEX)	1:44:51
4 × 100 metres relay	Canada	46.37				
4 × 400 metres relay	Barbados	3:36.58	Canada	3:37.90	Mexico	3:49.83

== Medal table ==
* Host nation (Mexico)

Rank	Nation	Gold	Silver	Bronze	Total
1	United States (USA)	19	12	3	34
2	Mexico (MEX)*	9	11	14	34
3	Canada (CAN)	6	8	4	18
4	Barbados (BAR)	4	2	3	9
5	Jamaica (JAM)	2	3	3	8
6	Bahamas (BAH)	2	2	2	6
7	Saint Kitts and Nevis (SKN)	2	0	0	2
8	Puerto Rico (PUR)	1	0	1	2
9	Netherlands Antilles (ANT)	0	1	2	3
10	Cayman Islands (CAY)	0	1	1	2
10	Guatemala (GUA)	0	1	1	2
12	Nicaragua (NCA)	0	1	0	1
13	British Virgin Islands (IVB)	0	0	2	2
Totals (13 entries)		45	42	36	123

== Team scores ==
Team scores were published.

The host country is highlighted in lavender blue

Rank	Nation	Points
1st place, gold medalist(s)	Mexico	365
2	United States	263
3	Canada	161
4	Barbados	105
5	Jamaica	66
6	Bahamas	53
7	Guatemala	34
8	Puerto Rico	25
9	Antigua and Barbuda	19
10	British Virgin Islands	16
10	Saint Kitts and Nevis	16
10	Trinidad and Tobago	16
13	Cayman Islands	13
14	Nicaragua	11
15	El Salvador	8
16	Saint Vincent and the Grenadines	6
17	Dominica	5
17	Netherlands Antilles	5
19	Anguilla	3
20	Belize	1
20	Saint Lucia	1

== Participation ==
The participation of 184 athletes from 21 countries was reported.

- Anguilla (1)
- Antigua and Barbuda (2)
- Bahamas (7)
- Barbados (16)
- Belize (2)
- British Virgin Islands (2)
- Canada (20)
- Cayman Islands (1)
- Dominica (1)
- El Salvador (2)
- Guatemala (6)
- Jamaica (8)
- Mexico (64)
- (flag) Netherlands Antilles (1)
- Nicaragua (2)
- Puerto Rico (5)
- Saint Kitts and Nevis (1)
- Saint Lucia (1)
- Saint Vincent and the Grenadines (2)
- Trinidad and Tobago (4)
- United States (36)
