= Luis Luna (athlete) =

Venezuelan sprinter

Personal information
- Nationality: Venezuelan
- Born: 29 December 1983 (age 42)

Sport
- Sport: Sprinting
- Event: 400 metres
Medal record
Representing Venezuela
Central American and Caribbean Games
Bronze medal – third place	2002 San Salvador	4x400m relay
South American Games
Silver medal – second place	2002 Belem	400m
Silver medal – second place	2002 Belem	4x400m relay

Luis Raúl Luna Lemus (born 29 December 1983) is a Venezuelan sprinter. He competed in the men's 400 metres at the 2004 Summer Olympics.

Luna later competed for the Kentucky Wildcats track and field team in the NCAA.
