= Jorge Richardson =

Puerto Rican sprinter

Jorge L. Richardson Osorio (born February 11, 1976) is a retired male track and field athlete, who competed in the sprints events during his career. He competed for his native country at the 2000 Summer Olympics, where he was eliminated in the first round of the men's 4×100 metres relay, alongside Osvaldo Nieves, Rogelio Pizarro and Félix Omar Fernández. Richardson ran the third leg in the race.

== International competitions ==
| Year | Competition | Venue | Position | Event | Notes |
Representing Puerto Rico
| 2002 | Central American and Caribbean Games | San Salvador, El Salvador | — | 100m | DQ |
| 2002 | Central American and Caribbean Games | San Salvador, El Salvador | 5th | 200m | 21.21 (wind: -0.4 m/s) |
| 2002 | Central American and Caribbean Games | San Salvador, El Salvador | — | 4×100m relay | DNF |
