= Hugo Romero =

Ecuadorian sports shooter (born 1946)

Personal information
- Nationality: Ecuadorian
- Born: 11 October 1946 (age 78)

Sport
- Sport: Sports shooting

Hugo Romero (born 11 October 1946) is an Ecuadorian sports shooter. He competed at the 1984 Summer Olympics, the 1988 Summer Olympics and the 1992 Summer Olympics.
