= Margarita Tapia =

Mexican long-distance runner

Personal information
- Full name: Margarita Tapia García
- Born: 16 November 1976 (age 49) Mexico City, Mexico

Sport
- Sport: Long-distance running
- Event: Marathon

Margarita Tapia García (born 16 November 1976) is a Mexican long-distance runner. She competed in the women's marathon at the 2004 Summer Olympics. In January, 2004 she won the Houston Marathon with a time of 2:28:36, a performance which landed her on the Mexican national Olympic team. In 2008 she won the Guadalajara Marathon.

On March 1, 2009 at the Maratón de la Comarca Lagunera she finished in first but was disqualified for Betamethasone doping and subsequently banned for 6 months, giving Dulce María Rodríguez the victory.
