= 2003 Central American and Caribbean Championships in Athletics – Results =

These are the official results of the 2003 Central American and Caribbean Championships in Athletics which took place on July 4–6, 2003 in St. George's, Grenada.

== Men's results ==
=== 100 meters ===
Heats – July 4
Wind:
Heat 1: +0.6 m/s, Heat 2: +1.1 m/s, Heat 3: +0.8 m/s, Heat 4: +0.5 m/s, Heat 5: +0.8 m/s

Rank	Heat	Name	Nationality	Time	Notes
1	3	Sheldon Morant	Jamaica	10.21	Q
2	5	Fabrice Calligny	Martinique	10.22	Q
3	2	Ronald Pognon	Martinique	10.29	Q
3	5	Churandy Martina	Netherlands Antilles	10.29	Q, NJR
5	1	Kim Collins	Saint Kitts and Nevis	10.44	Q
6	1	Darrel Brown	Trinidad and Tobago	10.45	Q
7	4	Marc Burns	Trinidad and Tobago	10.49	Q
8	4	Bruce Swan	Grenada	10.52	Q
8	5	Derrick Atkins	Bahamas	10.52	Q
10	1	Adrian Durant	United States Virgin Islands	10.53	Q
11	3	Delwayne Delaney	Saint Kitts and Nevis	10.56	Q
12	2	Clement Campbell	Jamaica	10.57	Q
13	4	Jorge Richardson	Puerto Rico	10.59	Q
14	1	Charlton Rafaela	Netherlands Antilles	10.60	Q
15	4	Kevin Bartlett	Barbados	10.61	Q
16	2	Jamial Rolle	Bahamas	10.63	Q
16	4	Sherwin James	Dominica	10.63	q
18	5	Omar Cortes	Venezuela	10.65	Q
19	1	Juan Morillo	Venezuela	10.66	q
19	3	Andre Blackman	Guyana	10.66	Q
19	3	Kenneth John	Dominica	10.66	Q
22	5	Andrew Hinds	Barbados	10.69	q
23	4	Xavier James	Bermuda	10.78	q
24	3	Azik Graham	Saint Vincent and the Grenadines	10.80	
25	3	Darian Forbes	Turks and Caicos Islands	10.81	NR
26	5	Marlon Martin	Saint Vincent and the Grenadines	10.87	
27	1	Jermaine Scantlebury	Antigua and Barbuda	10.88	
28	2	Olivier Saint-Aude	Haiti	10.89	Q
29	2	Ferron McIntosh	Grenada	10.92	
30	1	Pierre de Windt	Aruba	11.07	
31	3	Rodney Pitts	United States Virgin Islands	11.38	
32	2	Anthony Missick	Turks and Caicos Islands	11.78	
	2	Osvaldo Nieves	Puerto Rico	DNS	
	4	Rolando Blanco	Guatemala	DNS	

Semifinals – July 4
Wind:
Heat 1: +2.6 m/s, Heat 2: +0.4 m/s, Heat 3: +3.0 m/s

Rank	Heat	Name	Nationality	Time	Notes
1	3	Ronald Pognon	Martinique	10.12	Q
2	3	Kim Collins	Saint Kitts and Nevis	10.14	Q
3	1	Sheldon Morant	Jamaica	10.24	Q
4	1	Darrel Brown	Trinidad and Tobago	10.24	Q
5	1	Churandy Martina	Netherlands Antilles	10.32	q
6	2	Marc Burns	Trinidad and Tobago	10.35	Q
7	2	Fabrice Calligny	Martinique	10.41	Q
8	1	Adrian Durant	United States Virgin Islands	10.42	q
9	2	Derrick Atkins	Bahamas	10.44	
10	1	Jamial Rolle	Bahamas	10.45	
11	3	Jorge Richardson	Puerto Rico	10.51	
12	2	Bruce Swan	Grenada	10.53	
13	1	Delwayne Delaney	Saint Kitts and Nevis	10.54	
14	3	Charlton Rafaela	Netherlands Antilles	10.64	
15	3	Sherwin James	Dominica	10.65	
16	2	Kevin Bartlett	Barbados	10.68	
17	3	Juan Morillo	Venezuela	10.69	
18	3	Andre Blackman	Guyana	10.83	
19	1	Kenneth John	Dominica	10.84	
19	2	Xavier James	Bermuda	10.84	
21	3	Clement Campbell	Jamaica	10.86	
22	2	Olivier Saint-Aude	Haiti	10.91	
23	2	Omar Cortes	Venezuela	10.92	
	1	Andrew Hinds	Barbados	DNS	

Final – July 4
Wind: +0.6 m/s

Rank	Name	Nationality	Time	Notes
1st place, gold medalist(s)	Kim Collins	Saint Kitts and Nevis	10.13	
2nd place, silver medalist(s)	Darrel Brown	Trinidad and Tobago	10.17	
3rd place, bronze medalist(s)	Marc Burns	Trinidad and Tobago	10.29	
4	Ronald Pognon	Martinique	10.30	
5	Sheldon Morant	Jamaica	10.34	
6	Churandy Martina	Netherlands Antilles	10.52	
7	Fabrice Calligny	Martinique	10.53	
8	Adrian Durant	United States Virgin Islands	10.76	

=== 200 meters ===
Heats – July 5
Wind:
Heat 1: +2.7 m/s, Heat 2: +3.3 m/s, Heat 3: +0.8 m/s

Rank	Heat	Name	Nationality	Time	Notes
1	1	Dominic Demeritte	Bahamas	20.29	Q
2	1	Ainsley Waugh	Jamaica	20.57	Q
3	2	Kim Collins	Saint Kitts and Nevis	20.61	Q
4	1	Jacey Harper	Trinidad and Tobago	20.68	q
5	2	Julien Raeburn	Trinidad and Tobago	20.78	Q
6	3	Christopher Williams	Jamaica	20.79	Q
7	3	Troy McIntosh	Bahamas	20.84	Q
8	3	Rogelio Pizarro	Puerto Rico	20.94	q
9	3	Bruce Swan	Grenada	20.97	
10	1	Kevin Arthurton	Saint Kitts and Nevis	21.05	
11	1	José Carabalí	Venezuela	21.14	
12	2	Hely Ollarves	Venezuela	21.15	
13	2	Jorge Richardson	Puerto Rico	21.36	
14	3	Xavier James	Bermuda	21.54	
15	2	Ferron McIntosh	Grenada	21.60	
16	3	Jermaine Scantlebury	Antigua and Barbuda	21.62	
17	2	Andre Blackman	Guyana	21.71	
18	1	Prince Kwidama	Netherlands Antilles	21.77	
19	1	Darian Forbes	Turks and Caicos Islands	22.05	
20	3	Abasey Ralph	Saint Vincent and the Grenadines	22.24	
21	3	Olivier Saint-Aude	Haiti	23.42	
22	2	Anthony Missick	Turks and Caicos Islands	23.46	
	1	Marlon Martin	Saint Vincent and the Grenadines	DNS	

Final – July 6
Wind:
0.0 m/s

Rank	Name	Nationality	Time	Notes
1st place, gold medalist(s)	Dominic Demeritte	Bahamas	20.43	
2nd place, silver medalist(s)	Julien Raeburn	Trinidad and Tobago	20.57	
3rd place, bronze medalist(s)	Christopher Williams	Jamaica	20.58	
4	Jacey Harper	Trinidad and Tobago	20.80	
5	Ainsley Waugh	Jamaica	20.86	
6	Rogelio Pizarro	Puerto Rico	20.93	
7	Troy McIntosh	Bahamas	21.60	
	Kim Collins	Saint Kitts and Nevis	DNS	

=== 400 meters ===
Heats – July 4

Rank	Heat	Name	Nationality	Time	Notes
1	2	Chris Brown	Bahamas	45.83	Q
2	1	Alleyne Francique	Grenada	45.84	Q
3	2	Glauber Garzon	Cuba	45.86	Q
4	1	Lanceford Spence	Jamaica	45.97	Q
5	3	Dennis Darling	Bahamas	46.18	Q
6	2	Richard James	Jamaica	46.21	q
7	3	Damion Barry	Trinidad and Tobago	46.26	Q
8	1	Ato Modibo	Trinidad and Tobago	46.31	q
9	3	William Hernández	Venezuela	46.41	
10	3	Chris Lloyd	Dominica	46.55	
11	2	Félix Martínez	Puerto Rico	47.06	
12	1	Melville Rogers	Saint Kitts and Nevis	47.31	
13	2	Jason Hunte	Barbados	47.38	
14	1	Geronimo Goeloe	Netherlands Antilles	47.39	
15	2	Jonathan Palma	Venezuela	47.40	
16	3	Enote Inanga	Saint Kitts and Nevis	47.50	
17	1	Kenneth Telemaque	United States Virgin Islands	48.29	
18	3	Sheldon Noel	Grenada	48.94	
19	2	Kevin Fahie	British Virgin Islands	49.77	
20	3	Wilan Louis	Barbados	50.22	
21	3	Bernell Smithen	United States Virgin Islands	50.57	
22	1	Courtney Bascombe	Saint Vincent and the Grenadines	51.68	
23	2	Andrew Bradshaw	Saint Vincent and the Grenadines	51.82	

Final – July 5

Rank	Name	Nationality	Time	Notes
1st place, gold medalist(s)	Alleyne Francique	Grenada	45.27	
2nd place, silver medalist(s)	Chris Brown	Bahamas	45.42	
3rd place, bronze medalist(s)	Ato Modibo	Trinidad and Tobago	45.81	
4	Glauber Garzon	Cuba	46.08	
5	Richard James	Jamaica	46.22	
6	Damion Barry	Trinidad and Tobago	46.30	
7	Lanceford Spence	Jamaica	46.31	
8	Dennis Darling	Bahamas	46.59	

=== 800 meters ===
Heats – July 4

Rank	Heat	Name	Nationality	Time	Notes
1	3	Simeon Bovell	Trinidad and Tobago	1:50.32	Q
2	3	Marvin Watts	Jamaica	1:50.43	Q
3	1	Sherridan Kirk	Trinidad and Tobago	1:51.35	Q
4	1	Simoncito Silvera	Venezuela	1:51.39	Q
5	1	Tai Payne	Guyana	1:51.99	q
6	2	Ricardo Etheridge	Puerto Rico	1:52.56	Q
7	2	Jermaine Myers	Jamaica	1:52.92	Q
8	3	Luis Soto	Puerto Rico	1:52.92	q
9	2	Jean Destine	Haiti	1:52.96	
10	1	Nigel Leonce	Saint Lucia	1:53.53	
11	1	Kendall Simon	Grenada	1:55.30	
12	3	William Richards	Antigua and Barbuda	1:56.00	
13	3	Samuel Noel	Saint Vincent and the Grenadines	1:56.01	
14	2	Michael Donawa	Bermuda	1:56.97	
15	3	Richard Walcott	Bermuda	1:57.42	
16	2	Andy Grant	Saint Vincent and the Grenadines	1:58.81	
	2	Juan Luis Barrios	Mexico	DNS	

Final – July 5

Rank	Name	Nationality	Time	Notes
1st place, gold medalist(s)	Sherridan Kirk	Trinidad and Tobago	1:49.10	
2nd place, silver medalist(s)	Jermaine Myers	Jamaica	1:49.36	
3rd place, bronze medalist(s)	Marvin Watts	Jamaica	1:49.48	
4	Luis Soto	Puerto Rico	1:49.76	
5	Simeon Bovell	Trinidad and Tobago	1:49.90	
6	Simoncito Silvera	Venezuela	1:51.00	
7	Ricardo Etheridge	Puerto Rico	1:51.62	
8	Tai Payne	Guyana	1:51.90	

=== 1500 meters ===
July 6

Rank	Name	Nationality	Time	Notes
1st place, gold medalist(s)	Juan Luis Barrios	Mexico	3:44.78	
2nd place, silver medalist(s)	Ricardo Etheridge	Puerto Rico	3:48.68	
3rd place, bronze medalist(s)	Mario Smith	Jamaica	3:52.22	
4	Kendall Simon	Grenada	4:00.04	
5	William Richards	Antigua and Barbuda	4:03.04	
6	William Bonike	United States Virgin Islands	4:04.65	
7	Michael Donawa	Bermuda	4:11.15	
8	Samuel Noel	Saint Vincent and the Grenadines	4:13.13	
	Miguel García	Venezuela	DNS	
	Glenn Semerel	Aruba	DNS	
	Isaías Haro	Mexico	DNS	
	Mario Wright	Jamaica	DNS	
	Alexander Greaux	Puerto Rico	DNS	

=== 5000 meters ===
Non-championship event – July 4

Rank	Name	Nationality	Time	Notes
1	Eduardo Rojas	Mexico	14:29.88	
2	José Amado García	Guatemala	14:40.94	
3	Pamenos Ballantyne	Saint Vincent and the Grenadines	14:43.72	
4	Glenn Semerel	Aruba	16:54.59	
	Coyetano Hernández	Mexico	DNS	
	José Acierno	Mexico	DNS	

=== 10,000 meters ===
July 5

Rank	Name	Nationality	Time	Notes
1st place, gold medalist(s)	Eduardo Rojas	Mexico	29:37.08	
2nd place, silver medalist(s)	Alfredo Arévalo	Guatemala	29:39.48	
3rd place, bronze medalist(s)	José Amado García	Guatemala	29:42.52	
4	José Alejandro Semprún	Venezuela	31:02.62	
	Pamenos Ballantyne	Saint Vincent and the Grenadines	DNS	
	Odilon Cuanville	Mexico	DNS	

=== Half marathon ===
July 6

Rank	Name	Nationality	Time	Notes
1st place, gold medalist(s)	Pamenos Ballantyne	Saint Vincent and the Grenadines	1:09:14	
2nd place, silver medalist(s)	Alfredo Arévalo	Guatemala	1:09:39	
3rd place, bronze medalist(s)	Claude Nohile	Martinique	1:10:59	
4	Casimir Janivel	Martinique	1:15:46	
5	José Alejandro Semprún	Venezuela	1:16:13	
6	Victor Ledgers	Saint Lucia	1:16:40	
7	Eduardo Rojas	Mexico	1:17:57	
8	Luis Collazo	Puerto Rico	1:31:07	
9	Alexander Martínez	Cuba	1:31:50	
	Catalino Yucute	Guatemala	DNS	
	Alejandro Cuatepitzi	Mexico	DNS	
	Jesús Primo	Mexico	DNS	

=== 110 meters hurdles ===
Non-championship event – July 5
Wind:
+0.5 m/s

Rank	Name	Nationality	Time	Notes
1	Hugh Henry	Barbados	13.85	
2	Alleyne Lett	Grenada	13.98	NR
3	Ricardo Melbourne	Jamaica	14.01	
4	Luis López	Mexico	14.37	

=== 400 meters hurdles ===
Heats – July 4

Rank	Heat	Name	Nationality	Time	Notes
1	1	Sergio Hierrezuelo	Cuba	49.31	
2	1	Oscar Juanz	Mexico	50.68	
3	1	Ryan King	Barbados	50.75	
4	1	Greg Little	Jamaica	51.00	
5	2	Roberto Carvajal	Mexico	51.54	
6	2	Shane Charles	Grenada	51.63	
7	2	Douglas Lynes-Bell	Bahamas	51.67	
8	2	Ryan Smith	Barbados	51.90	
9	2	Javier Culson	Puerto Rico	52.44	
10	1	Samuel Rivera	Puerto Rico	52.83	
11	1	Demarius Cash	Bahamas	52.88	
12	2	Roberto Cortés	El Salvador	53.00	
	1	Roberto Cortés	Venezuela	DNF	
	2	Ian Weakley	Jamaica	DNS	

Final – July 5

Rank	Heat	Athlete	Nationality	Time	Notes
1st place, gold medalist(s)	1	Greg Little	Jamaica	50.04	
2nd place, silver medalist(s)	1	Sergio Hierrezuelo	Cuba	50.26	
3rd place, bronze medalist(s)	1	Oscar Juanz	Mexico	50.34	
4	2	Ryan Smith	Barbados	50.98	
5	2	Roberto Carvajal	Mexico	51.11	
6	1	Ryan King	Barbados	51.26	
7	2	Douglas Lynes-Bell	Bahamas	51.42	
8	2	Shane Charles	Grenada	51.54	NR
9	2	Javier Culson	Puerto Rico	52.13	
10	2	Roberto Cortés	El Salvador	52.35	
11	1	Samuel Rivera	Puerto Rico	54.36	
	1	Roberto Cortés	Venezuela	DNS	
	1	Demarius Cash	Bahamas	DNS	
	2	Ian Weakley	Jamaica	DNS	

=== 3000 meters steeplechase ===
Non-championship event – July 5

Rank	Name	Nationality	Time	Notes
1	Alexander Greaux	Puerto Rico	8:39.68	
2	Néstor Nieves	Venezuela	8:40.27	
	Salvador Miranda	Mexico	DNS	
	César Lizano	Costa Rica	DNS	

=== 4 x 100 meters relay ===
Heats – July 5

Rank	Heat	Nation	Competitors	Time	Notes
1	1	Netherlands Antilles	Geronimo Goeloe, Charlton Rafaela, Jairo Duzant, Churandy Martina	39.53	Q
2	2	Trinidad and Tobago	Cleavon Dillon, Marc Burns, Nicconnor Alexander, Darrel Brown	39.70	Q
3	1	Jamaica	Marvin Essor, Sheldon Morant, Christopher Williams, Ainsley Waugh	39.94	Q
4	1	Venezuela	Juan Morillo, Omar Cortes, José Carabalí, Hely Ollarves	39.95	Q
5	2	Bahamas	Michael Beckley, Clement Taylor, Jamial Rolle, Derrick Atkins	40.02	Q
6	2	Saint Kitts and Nevis	Kevin Arthurton, Delwayne Delaney, Donnell Esdaille, Kim Collins	40.10	Q
7	1	Grenada	Andon Mitchell, Bruce Swan, Ferron McIntosh, Aldin Alexander	40.13	q, NR
8	2	Cayman Islands	Robert Ibeh, Stephan Johnson, Andre Burton, Kareem Streete-Thompson	40.29	q
9	1	Puerto Rico		40.32	
10	1	Dominica	Fabian Florant, Sherwin James, Chris Lloyd, Kenneth John	40.48	NR
11	2	United States Virgin Islands	Rodney Pitts, Adrian Durant, Kenneth Telemaque, J. Felex	41.72	
	2	Saint Vincent and the Grenadines	Marlon Martin, Ozari Williams, Casnel Bushay, Abasey Ralph	DQ	
	1	Barbados		DNS	
	2	Guatemala		DNS	

Final – July 5

Rank	Nation	Competitors	Time	Notes
1st place, gold medalist(s)	Trinidad and Tobago		39.05	CR
2nd place, silver medalist(s)	Jamaica		39.20	
3rd place, bronze medalist(s)	Netherlands Antilles		39.46	NR
4	Bahamas		39.70	
5	Saint Kitts and Nevis		39.88	NR
6	Venezuela		40.19	
7	Grenada		40.34	
8	Cayman Islands		41.50	

=== 4 x 400 meters relay ===
July 6

Rank	Nation	Competitors	Time	Notes
1st place, gold medalist(s)	Bahamas	Avard Moncur, Carl Oliver, Nathaniel McKinney, Chris Brown	3:02.56	
2nd place, silver medalist(s)	Jamaica	Marvin Essor, Lanceford Spence, Jermaine Myers, Richard James	3:04.08	
3rd place, bronze medalist(s)	Trinidad and Tobago	Damion Barry, Julieon Raeburn, Simeon Bovell, Sherridan Kirk	3:04.48	
4	Venezuela	Jonathan Palma, Simoncito Silvera, Luis Luna, William Hernández	3:05.44	
5	Grenada	Bruce Swan, Alleyne Francique, Sheldon Noel, Shane Charles	3:06.98	NR
6	Puerto Rico	Félix Martínez, Luis Soto, Ricardo Etheridge, Jorge Richardson	3:08.62	
7	Saint Kitts and Nevis	Melville Rogers, Enote Inanga, Jakaba Joseph, Kevin Arthurton	3:10.93	NR
8	Saint Vincent and the Grenadines	Andrew Bradshaw, Courtney Bascombe, Samuel Noel, Andy Grant	3:26.23	

=== 18,000 meters walk ===
Non-championship event – July 4

Rank	Name	Nationality	Time	Notes
1	Julio René Martínez	Guatemala	1:22:07	
2	Jose Olivares	Mexico	1:24:02	
3	Luis Fernando García	Guatemala	1:26:01	
3	Ezequiel Nazario	Puerto Rico	1:26:01	
	Oscar Ramírez	Mexico	DNS	

=== High jump ===
July 6

Rank	Name	Nationality	1.90	1.95	2.00	2.05	2.10	2.15	2.18	2.21	2.27	Result	Notes
1st place, gold medalist(s)	Lisvany Pérez	Cuba	–	–	–	–	–	o	–	xxo	xxx	2.21	
2nd place, silver medalist(s)	Huguens Jean	Haiti	–	–	–	–	o	xo	xxx			2.15	
3rd place, bronze medalist(s)	Henderson Dottin	Barbados	–	–	–	–	xo	xo	xxx			2.15	
4	Damon Thompson	Barbados	–	–	–	xo	xo	xxo	xxx			2.15	
5	Romel Lightbourne	Bahamas	xxo	o	o	o	xxo	xxx				2.10	
6	Omar Camacho	Puerto Rico	–	–	o	o	–	xxx				2.05	
7	Garvin Peters	Grenada	–	–	–	xo	xxx					2.05	
7	James Rolle	Bahamas	–	–	–	xo	xxx					2.05	
9	Pierre de Windt	Aruba	o	o	o	xxo	xxx					2.05	NR
10	James Grayman	Antigua and Barbuda	xo	xo	xxx							1.95	
	Pedro Pineira	Mexico										DNS	
	Gerardo Martínez	Mexico										DNS	

=== Pole vault ===
Non-championship event – July 6

Rank	Name	Nationality	4.80	5.00	5.10	5.30	5.45	Result	Notes
1	Giovanni Lanaro	Mexico	–	–	o	xxo	xxx	5.30	
2	Ricardo Diez	Venezuela	xo	o	xxx			5.00	
	Robison Pratt	Mexico						DNS	
	Christian Sánchez	Mexico						DNS	
	Jorge Solórzano	Guatemala						DNS	

=== Long jump ===
Qualification – July 5

Rank	Group	Name	Nationality	Result	Notes
1	A	Osbourne Moxey	Bahamas	8.10	q
1	B	Víctor Castillo	Venezuela	8.10	q
3	A	Kareem Streete-Thompson	Cayman Islands	7.85	q
4	B	Aundre Edwards	Jamaica	7.63	q
5	A	Kevin Bartlett	Barbados	7.50	q
6	A	Cleavon Dillon	Trinidad and Tobago	7.39	q
7	A	Carlos Nieves	Puerto Rico	7.25	q
8	A	Sherwin James	Dominica	7.24	q
9	A	Devon Bean	Bermuda	7.23	q
9	A	Yann Fitt-Duval	Martinique	7.23	q
11	B	Caraballo Soto	Puerto Rico	7.20	q
12	B	Lloyd Browne	Saint Kitts and Nevis	7.20	q
14	B	Ayata Joseph	Antigua and Barbuda	7.20	
15	B	Joel Phillip	Grenada	7.08	
16	A	Ralston Henry	British Virgin Islands	7.01	
16	B	Jean Cummings	Saint Vincent and the Grenadines	7.01	
18	B	Wayne McSween	Grenada	6.82	
19	A	Kevin Arthurton	Saint Kitts and Nevis	6.76	

Final – July 6

Rank	Name	Nationality	#1	#2	#3	#4	#5	#6	Result	Notes
1st place, gold medalist(s)	Kareem Streete-Thompson	Cayman Islands	6.03	x	8.12w	7.64	7.97w	x	8.12w	
2nd place, silver medalist(s)	Osbourne Moxey	Bahamas	7.72	7.56	7.79w	7.85w	7.61	7.78	7.85w	
3rd place, bronze medalist(s)	Aundre Edwards	Jamaica	7.47w	7.74w	7.69	7.52	x	7.70	7.74w	
4	Víctor Castillo	Venezuela	7.60	x	7.59	x	–	–	7.60	
5	Devon Bean	Bermuda	6.86w	7.18w	7.29	7.47w	5.61w	7.24w	7.47w	
6	Sherwin James	Dominica	x	7.01	7.21w	7.18w	7.13	7.39	7.39	
7	Cleavon Dillon	Trinidad and Tobago	7.35w	7.24	–	7.16	x	7.06	7.35w	
8	Lloyd Browne	Saint Kitts and Nevis	6.97w	6.83	7.22	–	–	–	7.22	
9	Carlos Nieves	Puerto Rico	6.79	7.16	x				7.16	
10	Yann Fitt-Duval	Martinique	x	7.07	x				7.07	
11	Caraballo Soto	Puerto Rico	6.93w	6.75	6.91				6.93w	
	Kevin Bartlett	Barbados	x	x	x				NM	

=== Triple jump ===
July 6

Rank	Name	Nationality	#1	#2	#3	#4	#5	#6	Result	Notes
1st place, gold medalist(s)	Leevan Sands	Bahamas	16.77	16.62	16.86	16.72	16.49	17.16	17.16	
2nd place, silver medalist(s)	Gregory Hughes	Barbados	15.43w	15.90w	x	16.17	x	x	16.17	
3rd place, bronze medalist(s)	Ayata Joseph	Antigua and Barbuda	15.63	15.67	15.94	x	x	15.91	15.94	
4	José Reyes	Venezuela	x	15.13	15.67	15.65	15.72	x	15.72	
5	Daniel Mayaud	Martinique	15.72	x	x	15.21	x	x	15.72	
6	Johnny Rodríguez	Venezuela	15.62w	x	15.68	15.61	15.71	x	15.71	
7	Kenneth Sylvester	Jamaica	15.00	15.34	x	13.49	15.03w	–	15.34	
8	Lloyd Browne	Saint Kitts and Nevis	14.02w	14.64	14.51	14.75	14.71	14.87	14.87	
9	Brian Wellman	Bermuda	x	13.85	x				13.85	
	Fabian Florant	Dominica							DNS	
	Wayne McSween	Grenada							DNS	
	Álvaro Paiz	Guatemala							DNS	

=== Shot put ===
July 5

Rank	Name	Nationality	#1	#2	#3	#4	#5	#6	Result	Notes
1st place, gold medalist(s)	Yojer Medina	Venezuela	x	x	19.04	x	19.17	x	19.17	
2nd place, silver medalist(s)	Francisco Guzmán	Mexico	16.40	17.80	17.82	17.63	17.48	x	17.82	
3rd place, bronze medalist(s)	Dave Stoute	Trinidad and Tobago	17.20	17.50	17.70	x	x	x	17.70	
4	Expedi Pena	Dominican Republic	15.00	15.62	15.56	15.28	15.40	15.60	15.62	
5	Kerlon Peters	Grenada	14.69	14.77	x	x	x	x	14.77	
	Manuel Repollet	Puerto Rico	x	x	x	x	x	x	NM	
	Paulino Ríos	Mexico							DNS	
	Cliff Williams	British Virgin Islands							DNS	

=== Discus throw ===
July 4

Rank	Name	Nationality	#1	#2	#3	#4	#5	#6	Result	Notes
1st place, gold medalist(s)	Alfredo Romero	Puerto Rico	x	54.09	x	51.97	52.62	x	54.09	
2nd place, silver medalist(s)	Alleyne Lett	Grenada	49.46	51.83	52.42	x	53.14	50.35	53.14	
3rd place, bronze medalist(s)	David Bissoly	Martinique	49.94	52.33	51.46	x	52.26	52.38	52.38	
4	Jesús Parejo	Venezuela	51.23	50.10	51.50	x	50.55	51.85	51.85	
5	Eric Matthias	British Virgin Islands	x	51.42	49.71	48.69	49.11	45.30	51.42	
6	Héctor Hurtado	Venezuela	49.26	x	x	x	x	x	49.26	
7	Expedi Pena	Dominican Republic	40.10	x	47.28	48.58	47.71	46.68	48.58	
	Cliff Williams	British Virgin Islands	x	x	–	–	–	–	NM	
	Raúl Rivera	Guatemala							DNS	

=== Hammer throw ===
Non-championship event – July 5

Rank	Name	Nationality	#1	#2	#3	#4	#5	#6	Result	Notes
1	Yosvany Suárez	Cuba	x	68.53	x	x	x	69.59	69.59	
2	Aldo Bello	Venezuela	62.70	62.65	62.05	62.37	64.26	61.43	64.26	
3	Raúl Rivera	Guatemala	x	60.94	60.55	x	58.94	x	60.94	
4	Santos Vega	Puerto Rico	x	x	x	x	x	57.94	57.94	

=== Javelin throw ===
July 4

Rank	Name	Nationality	#1	#2	#3	#4	#5	#6	Result	Notes
1st place, gold medalist(s)	Manuel Fuenmayor	Venezuela	71.72	x	72.35	67.13	x	x	72.35	
2nd place, silver medalist(s)	Rigoberto Calderón	Nicaragua	63.64	64.59	65.76	62.68	62.86	67.50	67.50	
3rd place, bronze medalist(s)	Robert Barnes	Jamaica	64.44	63.20	66.57	63.28	63.50	63.70	66.57	
4	Christophe Marie-Nely	Martinique	63.90	61.09	59.49	63.28	61.39	59.40	63.90	
5	Trevor Modeste	Grenada	60.14	63.64	60.14	61.91	56.32	61.60	63.64	
6	Mike Modeste	Grenada	61.05	62.36	61.40	58.60	61.92	62.45	62.45	
7	Jamal Forde	Barbados	57.70	x	x				57.70	
	Luis Enrique Guzmán	Mexico							DNS	
	Edgar Maroyoaui	Mexico							DNS	
	Ronald Noguera	Venezuela							DNS	

=== Decathlon ===
July 4–5

The highest mark recorded in each event is highlighted in yellow

Rank	Athlete	Nationality	100m	LJ	SP	HJ	400m	110m H	DT	PV	JT	1500m	Points	Notes
1st place, gold medalist(s)	Yonelvis Águila	Cuba	11.13	7.05	12.79	1.96	50.16	14.76	43.42	3.95	57.79	5:05.26	7337	
2nd place, silver medalist(s)	Decosma Wright	Jamaica	10.75	6.89	13.90	1.81	49.41	14.29	39.16	NM	49.93	5:50.40	6383	
3rd place, bronze medalist(s)	Guillermo Toledo	Puerto Rico	11.18	6.80	10.76	1.75	52.87	15.46	29.42	3.25	43.64	5:06.64	6074	

== Women's results ==
=== 100 meters ===
Heats – July 4
Wind:
Heat 1: +0.7 m/s, Heat 2: +0.6 m/s, Heat 3: +0.8 m/s

Rank	Heat	Name	Nationality	Time	Notes
1	3	Virgen Benavides	Cuba	11.41	Q
2	3	Tamicka Clarke	Bahamas	11.44	Q
3	1	Kerron Stewart	Jamaica	11.45	Q
3	2	Judith Kitson	Jamaica	11.45	Q
5	3	Fana Ashby	Trinidad and Tobago	11.47	q
6	1	Heather Samuel	Antigua and Barbuda	11.54	Q
7	1	Shandria Brown	Bahamas	11.63	q
8	2	LaVerne Jones	United States Virgin Islands	11.67	Q
9	2	Wanda Hutson	Trinidad and Tobago	11.68	
10	3	Valma Bass	United States Virgin Islands	11.79	
11	2	Virgil Hodge	Saint Kitts and Nevis	11.82	
12	1	Roxana Mercado	Puerto Rico	11.87	
13	1	Carol Clarke	Saint Kitts and Nevis	11.92	
14	2	Sylvie Bisoly	Martinique	11.93	
15	1	Jessica Defreitas	Guyana	11.94	
15	3	Genna Williams	Barbados	11.94	
17	2	Chandora Cordington	Antigua and Barbuda	12.05	
18	3	Sherry Fletcher	Grenada	12.45	
19	1	Kenisha Joseph	Grenada	12.49	
	2	Tajuana Sully	Dominica	DNS	
	3	Wilmary Álvarez	Venezuela	DNS	
	3	Liliana Allen	Mexico	DNS	

Final – July 4
Wind:
+0.6 m/s

Rank	Name	Nationality	Time	Notes
1st place, gold medalist(s)	Fana Ashby	Trinidad and Tobago	11.32	
2nd place, silver medalist(s)	Tamicka Clarke	Bahamas	11.33	
3rd place, bronze medalist(s)	Judith Kitson	Jamaica	11.34	
4	Virgen Benavides	Cuba	11.37	
5	Kerron Stewart	Jamaica	11.48	
6	Heather Samuel	Antigua and Barbuda	11.56	
7	Shandria Brown	Bahamas	11.62	
8	LaVerne Jones	United States Virgin Islands	11.63	

=== 200 meters ===
Heats – July 5
Wind:
Heat 1: +4.5 m/s, Heat 2: +3.9 m/s, Heat 3: +0.5 m/s

Rank	Heat	Name	Nationality	Time	Notes
1	1	Cydonie Mothersille	Cayman Islands	22.41	Q
2	2	Christine Amertil	Bahamas	22.86	Q
3	1	Roxana Díaz	Cuba	23.03	Q
4	1	Tonique Williams	Bahamas	23.11	q
5	3	Danielle Browning	Jamaica	23.32	Q
6	3	Wilmary Álvarez	Venezuela	23.39	Q, NR
7	2	Jenice Daley	Jamaica	23.52	Q
8	3	Valma Bass	United States Virgin Islands	23.96	q
9	3	Carol Clarke	Saint Kitts and Nevis	24.02	
10	1	Ameerah Bello	United States Virgin Islands	24.05	
11	1	Genna Williams	Barbados	24.35	
12	2	Yelmi Martínez	Dominican Republic	24.40	
13	1	Sherry Fletcher	Grenada	24.51	
14	3	Chandora Cordington	Antigua and Barbuda	24.55	
15	2	Nadesca Sprockel	Netherlands Antilles	24.90	
16	2	Nathandra John	Saint Kitts and Nevis	25.39	
17	3	Kerry Telesford	Grenada	25.40	
	1	Heather Samuel	Antigua and Barbuda	DNS	
	2	Militza Castro	Puerto Rico	DNS	
	2	Liliana Allen	Mexico	DNS	
	3	Elma Pabon	Puerto Rico	DNS	

Final – July 6
Wind:
+0.2 m/s

Rank	Name	Nationality	Time	Notes
1st place, gold medalist(s)	Cydonie Mothersille	Cayman Islands	22.45	NR
2nd place, silver medalist(s)	Roxana Díaz	Cuba	22.74	
3rd place, bronze medalist(s)	Tonique Williams	Bahamas	22.80	
4	Christine Amertil	Bahamas	22.88	
5	Danielle Browning	Jamaica	23.23	
6	Wilmary Álvarez	Venezuela	23.45	
7	Valma Bass	United States Virgin Islands	24.18	
	Jenice Daley	Jamaica	DNS	

=== 400 meters ===
Heats

Rank	Heat	Name	Nationality	Time	Notes
1	2	Hazel-Ann Regis	Grenada	52.52	Q
2	1	Michelle Burgher	Jamaica	53.06	Q
3	1	Ana Pena	Cuba	53.33	Q
4	1	Gabriela Medina	Mexico	53.85	Q
5	2	Eliana Pacheco	Venezuela	54.18	Q
6	2	Maira González	Mexico	54.25	Q
7	1	Militza Castro	Puerto Rico	54.31	q
8	2	Adia McKinnon	Trinidad and Tobago	54.58	q
9	1	Ángela Alfonzo	Venezuela	55.00	
10	1	Yelmy Martínez	Dominican Republic	55.82	
11	2	Marcia Daniel	Dominica	57.29	
12	2	Kady Joseph	United States Virgin Islands	57.54	
13	1	Shanna Williams	United States Virgin Islands	1:02.08	
	1	Tonique Williams	Bahamas	DNS	
	2	Christine Amertil	Bahamas	DNS	
	2	Kineke Alexander	Saint Vincent and the Grenadines	DNS	

Final

Rank	Name	Nationality	Time	Notes
1st place, gold medalist(s)	Hazel-Ann Regis	Grenada	51.56	
2nd place, silver medalist(s)	Michelle Burgher	Jamaica	52.19	
3rd place, bronze medalist(s)	Eliana Pacheco	Venezuela	52.87	
4	Ana Pena	Cuba	52.89	
5	Adia McKinnon	Trinidad and Tobago	53.50	
6	Maira González	Mexico	53.51	
7	Gabriela Medina	Mexico	53.55	NJR
8	Militza Castro	Puerto Rico	53.56	

=== 800 meters ===
July 5

Rank	Name	Nationality	Time	Notes
1st place, gold medalist(s)	Neisha Bernard-Thomas	Grenada	2:04.12	
2nd place, silver medalist(s)	Kenia Sinclair	Jamaica	2:04.50	
3rd place, bronze medalist(s)	Sheena Gooding	Barbados	2:04.55	
4	Melissa de Leon	Trinidad and Tobago	2:04.86	
5	Sandra Moya	Puerto Rico	2:04.88	
6	Carlene Robinson	Jamaica	2:07.10	
7	Lizaira del Valle	Puerto Rico	2:07.63	
8	María Ángeles Pantoja	Mexico	2:11.32	
9	Alelhi Tapia	Mexico	2:11.56	
10	Tamika Williams	Bermuda	2:12.46	
11	Sherma Aurelin	United States Virgin Islands	2:24.31	

=== 1500 meters ===
Non-championship event – July 6

Rank	Name	Nationality	Time	Notes
1	Ashley Couper	Bermuda	4:27.71	
2	Alelhi Tapia	Mexico	4:32.16	
3	Elsa Monterroso	Guatemala	4:39.44	
4	Gabriela Trana	Costa Rica	4:42.85	
	Margarita Tapia	Mexico	DNS	
	Dina Cruz	Guatemala	DNS	

=== 10,000 meters ===
Non-championship event – July 4

Rank	Name	Nationality	Time	Notes
1	Yudelkis Martínez	Cuba	34:29.05	
2	Elsa Monterroso	Guatemala	35:54.46	NR
3	Lourdes Cruz	Puerto Rico	35:54.46	
	Adelaide Carrington	Saint Vincent and the Grenadines	DNF	
	Adriana Sánchez	Mexico	DNS	
	Angélica Sánchez	Mexico	DNS	

=== Half marathon ===
Non-championship event – July 6

Rank	Name	Nationality	Time	Notes
1	Lourdes Cruz	Puerto Rico	1:31:50	
2	Adelaide Carrington	Saint Vincent and the Grenadines	1:38:45	
3	Kenisha Pascal	Grenada	2:02:28	
	Bertha González	Guatemala	DNS	
	Erika Guevara	Mexico	DNS	
	Dolores Valencia	Mexico	DNS	
	Herlinda Xol	Guatemala	DNS	

=== 100 meters hurdles ===
July 5

Rank	Name	Nationality	Time	Notes
1st place, gold medalist(s)	Delloreen Ennis-London	Jamaica	12.70	CR
2nd place, silver medalist(s)	Nadine Faustin	Haiti	12.82	
3rd place, bronze medalist(s)	Vonette Dixon	Jamaica	13.35	
4	Dainelky Pérez	Cuba	13.48	
5	Thaimara Rivas	Venezuela	14.57	
6	Kenisha Joseph	Grenada	15.29	
	Andrea Blackett	Barbados	DNS	
	Sandrine Legenort	Venezuela	DNS	

=== 400 meters hurdles ===
July 5

Rank	Name	Nationality	Time	Notes
1st place, gold medalist(s)	Allison Beckford	Jamaica	55.12	CR
2nd place, silver medalist(s)	Yvonne Harrison	Puerto Rico	55.29	
3rd place, bronze medalist(s)	Andrea Blackett	Barbados	56.12	
4	Yusmely García	Venezuela	57.09	NR
5	Naleya Downer	Jamaica	57.44	
6	Josanne Lucas	Trinidad and Tobago	59.37	
7	Kishara George	Grenada	1:00.53	
8	Jackie-Ann Morain	Grenada	1:00.68	

=== 4 x 100 meters relay ===
July 5

Rank	Nation	Competitors	Time	Notes
1st place, gold medalist(s)	Bahamas	Tamicka Clarke, Debbie Ferguson, Christine Amertil, Shandria Brown	43.06	CR
2nd place, silver medalist(s)	Jamaica		43.30	
3rd place, bronze medalist(s)	Cuba	Dainelky Pérez, Roxana Díaz, Virgen Benavides, Magalys García	43.83	
4	Trinidad and Tobago	Josanne Lucas	44.42	
5	Puerto Rico		45.35	
6	United States Virgin Islands		45.85	
	Grenada	Trish Bartholomew, Kenisha Joseph, Kerry Telesford, Sherry Fletcher	DNF	
	Saint Kitts and Nevis		DNS	

=== 4 x 400 meters relay ===
July 6

Rank	Nation	Competitors	Time	Notes
1st place, gold medalist(s)	Jamaica	Naleya Downer, Michelle Burgher, Carlene Robinson, Allison Beckford	3:29.75	
2nd place, silver medalist(s)	Grenada	Kishara George, Neisha Bernard-Thomas, Jackie-Ann Morain, Hazel-Ann Regis	3:32.99	NR
3rd place, bronze medalist(s)	Puerto Rico	?, Sandra Moya, Lizaira del Valle, Militza Castro	3:33.35	
4	Mexico	America Rangel, Gabriela Medina, Magali Yánez, Maira González	3:35.07	
5	Venezuela	Wilmary Álvarez, Yusmely García, Ángela Alfonzo, Eliana Pacheco	3:38.06	
	Antigua and Barbuda		DNS	
	Bahamas		DNS	
	United States Virgin Islands		DNS	

=== 10,000 meters walk ===
Non-championship event – July 5

Rank	Name	Nationality	Time	Notes
1	Rosario Sánchez	Mexico	49:06.00	
2	Estela Hernández	Mexico	52:03.00	
	Teresita Collado	Guatemala	DNS	

=== High jump ===
July 4

Rank	Name	Nationality	1.60	1.65	1.70	1.73	1.76	1.79	1.81	1.83	Result	Notes
1st place, gold medalist(s)	Desiree Crichlow	Barbados	–	–	o	o	o	o	o	xxx	1.81	
2nd place, silver medalist(s)	Yetzálida Pérez	Venezuela	–	–	o	o	xxo	o	xxx		1.79	
3rd place, bronze medalist(s)	Keitha Mosley	Barbados	o	o	xxo	xo	o	xxx			1.76	
4	Vanessa Gladone	Martinique	o	o	o	xxo	xxx				1.73	
	Patricia Cornwall	Grenada	–	xxx							NM	
	Fabiola Ayala	Mexico									DNS	
	Romary Rifka	Mexico									DNS	

=== Pole vault ===
Non-championship event – July 4

Rank	Name	Nationality	3.70	3.80	3.90	4.00	4.10	Result	Notes
1	Alejandra Meza	Mexico	o	o	xo	xxo	xxx	4.00	NR
2	Dennise Orengo	Puerto Rico	xxo	o	xo	xxx		3.90	
	Katiuska Pérez	Cuba	–	xxx				NM	
	Lorena Espinoza	Mexico						DNS	

=== Long jump ===
July 5

Rank	Name	Nationality	#1	#2	#3	#4	#5	#6	Result	Notes
1st place, gold medalist(s)	Elva Goulbourne	Jamaica	6.81	6.95w	6.84w	6.72w	–	6.96w	6.96w	CR
2nd place, silver medalist(s)	Jackie Edwards	Bahamas	6.51	x	6.60w	6.38w	6.43	6.63w	6.63w	
3rd place, bronze medalist(s)	Yuridia Bustamante	Mexico	5.94	x	6.09	x	6.28w	x	6.28w	
4	Yesenia Rivera	Puerto Rico	x	6.27w	x	x	x	x	6.27w	
5	Daphne Saunders	Bahamas	5.88	6.06	6.09w	x	6.12w	6.26w	6.26w	
6	Elise Vesanes	Martinique	5.32w	5.24	6.23w	x	x	6.11	6.23w	
7	Keitha Mosley	Barbados	6.17	5.94	5.98w	6.07w	x	5.81	6.17	
8	María Espencer	Dominican Republic	5.62	5.78	6.04w	5.91	x	6.13w	6.13w	
9	Patricia Cornwall	Grenada	5.73	6.02w	5.89				6.02w	
10	Jessica Defreitas	Guyana	5.87	5.89	6.00				6.00	
11	Nyota Peters	Guyana	5.93	5.63	5.36w				5.93	
12	Stephanie Nisbett	Saint Kitts and Nevis	5.86	5.59	x				5.86	
13	Michelle Vaughn	Guyana	5.70	5.71	5.78				5.78	
14	Thaimara Rivas	Venezuela	5.57	x	4.25w				5.57	
	Sabrina Asturias	Guatemala							DNS	
	Magalys García	Cuba							DNS	

=== Triple jump ===
July 4

Rank	Name	Nationality	#1	#2	#3	#4	#5	#6	Result	Notes
1st place, gold medalist(s)	Suzette Lee	Jamaica	13.35w	13.40	13.22w	13.32	13.43	13.89w	13.89w	
2nd place, silver medalist(s)	María Espencer	Dominican Republic	13.21	12.76	13.41w	x	13.14	13.39	13.41w	
3rd place, bronze medalist(s)	Michelle Vaughn	Guyana	12.14	12.56	12.01w	12.10	12.68	12.74	12.74	
4	Daphne Saunders	Bahamas	x	x	x	x	11.50	11.82w	11.82w	
5	Patricia Cornwall	Grenada	x	x	x	x	11.35	11.72	11.72	NR
6	Stephanie Nisbett	Saint Kitts and Nevis	x	11.69	x	x	11.49w	11.30	11.69	
	María Paiz	Guatemala							DNS	

=== Shot put ===
July 6

Rank	Name	Nationality	#1	#2	#3	#4	#5	#6	Result	Notes
1st place, gold medalist(s)	Misleydis González	Cuba	17.75	18.09	x	x	x	17.85	18.09	
2nd place, silver medalist(s)	Cleopatra Borel	Trinidad and Tobago	x	17.46	x	16.99	x	17.79	17.79	NR
3rd place, bronze medalist(s)	Rosario Ramos	Venezuela	14.61	14.86	15.02	13.93	14.38	14.70	15.02	
4	Doris Thompson	Bahamas	11.61	12.16	13.04	x	13.22	x	13.22	
5	Isabella Charles	Dominica	12.60	11.53	x	x	11.42	11.74	12.60	
6	Tahirah Lewis	British Virgin Islands	10.46	11.42	x	10.99	x	x	11.42	
	Erandi Arteaga	Mexico							DNS	
	Tamara Lechuga	Mexico							DNS	
	Nyota Peters	Guyana							DNS	
	Catherine Stoute	Dominica							DNS	

=== Discus throw ===
July 4

Rank	Name	Nationality	#1	#2	#3	#4	#5	#6	Result	Notes
1st place, gold medalist(s)	Yania Ferrales	Cuba	58.25	59.07	58.78	57.57	58.00	58.53	59.07	
2nd place, silver medalist(s)	María Cubillán	Venezuela	49.05	47.28	x	45.37	44.52	x	49.05	
3rd place, bronze medalist(s)	Doris Thompson	Bahamas	x	31.05	31.40	38.82	43.88	x	43.88	
4	Shernelle Nicholls	Barbados	38.17	39.05	37.67	41.08	41.48	41.07	41.48	
5	Isabella Charles	Dominica	x	32.58	x	32.88	x	–	32.88	
6	Tajuana Sully	Dominica	x	x	31.93	x	32.82	x	32.82	
	Ana Espinoza	Guatemala							DNS	
	Sheba George	Grenada							DNS	

=== Hammer throw ===
Non-championship event – July 4

Rank	Name	Nationality	#1	#2	#3	#4	#5	#6	Result	Notes
1	Violeta Guzmán	Mexico	52.92	49.25	53.28	55.16	54.42	55.72	55.72	
2	Adriana Benaventa	Venezuela	50.82	x	x	x	x	x	50.82	
	Ana Espinoza	Guatemala							DNS	
	Ana Erika Gutiérrez	Mexico							DNS	

=== Javelin throw ===
July 6

Rank	Name	Nationality	#1	#2	#3	#4	#5	#6	Result	Notes
1st place, gold medalist(s)	Laverne Eve	Bahamas	54.31	56.75	54.24	56.58	56.23	53.64	56.75	
2nd place, silver medalist(s)	Kateema Riettie	Jamaica	49.59	43.54	50.67	51.36	x	51.19	51.36	
3rd place, bronze medalist(s)	Dalila Rugama	Nicaragua	44.60	x	47.40	40.86	43.34	x	47.40	
4	Natalie Vincent	Grenada	40.80	42.83	40.40	x	43.13	43.16	43.16	
5	Catherine Stoute	Dominica	40.85	x	40.85	x	x	35.58	40.85	
6	Thaimara Rivas	Venezuela	35.50	38.89	37.74	40.72	40.05	–	40.72	
7	Kathy-Ann Gilchrist	Grenada	36.16	32.84	36.08	32.73	36.72	39.66	39.66	
	Nyota Peters	Guyana							DNS	
	Magalys García	Cuba							DNS	
