= 1997 Pan American Junior Athletics Championships =

IX Pan American Junior Athletics Championships
- Dates: July 18–20
- Host city: Havana, Cuba
- Level: Junior
- Events: 43
- Participation: about 437 athletes from 25 nations

The 9th Pan American Junior Athletics Championships were held in Havana, Cuba, on July 18–20, 1997.

== Participation (unofficial) ==
Detailed result lists can be found on the "World Junior Athletics History" website. An unofficial count yields the number of about 437 athletes from about 25 countries: Argentina (11), Bahamas (14), Barbados (16), Brazil (31), Canada (40), Cayman Islands (4), Chile (10), Colombia (7), Costa Rica (2), Cuba (71), Dominican Republic (13), Ecuador (6), El Salvador (3), Guatemala (8), Guyana (2), Jamaica (41), Mexico (47), Panama (3), Paraguay (3), Peru (2), Puerto Rico (9), Trinidad and Tobago (7), United States (73), Uruguay (4), Venezuela (10).

== Medal summary ==
Medal winners are published. Complete results can be found on the "World Junior Athletics History" website.

=== Men ===
Event	Gold		Silver		Bronze	
100 metres	Ja'Warren Hooker (USA)	10.39	Josiah Howard (USA)	10.48	Misael Ortíz (CUB)	10.60
200 metres	Geno White (USA)	21.05	Bryan Harrison (USA)	21.10	Juan Pedro Toledo (MEX)	21.31
400 metres	Shane Niemi (CAN)	45.83	Avard Moncur (BAH)	46.56	Carlos Santa (DOM)	46.59
800 metres	Moses Washington (USA)	1:51.38	Shawn Gray (USA)	1:51.43	John Chávez (COL)	1:52.46
1500 metres	Michael Stember (USA)	3:49.81	Gabe Jennings (USA)	3:50.07	Claudinei Vítor (BRA)	3:51.17
5000 metres	Steve Lawrence (CAN)	14:23.65	Cristián Rosales (URU)	14:26.09	Gonzalo Gutiérrez (MEX)	14:27.01
10,000 metres	Edegar Lobo (BRA)	30:45.73	Adelmir Maier (BRA)	30:49.03	Gonzalo Gutiérrez (MEX)	30:54.70
3000 metres steeplechase	Yasser Noa (CUB)	8:59.50	Yunier González (CUB)	9:05.80	Raúl Mora (CHI)	9:09.38
110 metres hurdles	John McAfee (USA)	14.18	Stephen Jones (BAR)	14.34	Carlos Patterson (CUB)	14.49
400 metres hurdles	Angelo Taylor (USA)	50.03	Jeff Ellis (CAN)	51.62	John McAfee (USA)	51.66
4 × 100 metres relay	United States; Lawrence Armstrong; Josephus Howard; Bryan Harrison; Ja'warren Hooker	39.87	Cuba; José Ángel César; Misael Ortíz; Juan Blanco; Diosdado de la Cruz	40.21	Bahamas; Everette Fraser; Avard Moncur; T. Gray; Dominic Demeritte	40.77
4 × 400 metres relay	United States; Geno White; Ja'warren Hooker; Eddie Levine; Angelo Taylor	3:05.34	Bahamas; Dominic Demeritte; Chris Brown; Ednol Rolle; Avard Moncur	3:09.11	Jamaica; Sanjay Ayre; David Spencer; Dwayne Miller; Michael Campbell	3:09.48
10,000 metres track walk	Saúl Méndez (MEX)	43:55.90	Loisel Gutiérrez (CUB)	44:39.75	Yoandri Álvarez (CUB)	44:39.80
High jump	Mike Ponikvar (CAN)	2.24	Fabrício Romero (BRA)	2.18	Wagner Príncipe (BRA)	2.12
Pole vault	Robison Pratt (MEX)	5.00	Ina Bashnik (CAN)	4.80	Gustavo Rehder (BRA)	4.70
Long jump	Joan Lino Martínez (CUB)	8.06	Dwight Barrett (JAM)	7.87	Cameron Howard (USA)	7.80
Triple jump	Lenton Herring (USA)	16.00	Etién Hernández (CUB)	15.74	Yowalbis Rodríguez (CUB)	15.48
Shot put	Scott Denbo (USA)	16.76	Jhonny Rodríguez (COL)	16.56	Shawn Cormier (CAN)	16.30
Discus throw	Frank Casañas (CUB)	56.28	Sheddrick Gurley (USA)	54.12	Steve McCown (USA)	52.12
Hammer throw	Matthew Kavanagh (USA)	60.68	Abdul Munguía (CUB)	59.54	Cristian Fernández (ARG)	56.00
Javelin throw	Elier Duharte (CUB)	70.88	Pablo Gallardo (CUB)	70.08	Patrick Ramsey (USA)	67.14
Decathlon	Rashad Stafford (USA)	6762	Santiago Lorenzo (ARG)	6738	Michel Hernández (CUB)	6586

=== Women ===
Event	Gold		Silver		Bronze	
100 metres	Angela Williams (USA)	11.34	Aleisha Latimer (USA)	11.39	Cydonie Mothersill (CAY)	11.68
200 metres	Kinshasa Davis (USA)	23.90	Dewana Wright (BAH)	24.10	Cydonie Mothersill (CAY)	24.13
400 metres	Mairelín Fuentes (CUB)	53.50	Yudalis Díaz (CUB)	53.88	Keisha Downer (JAM)	53.98
800 metres	Mairelín Fuentes (CUB)	2:03.70	Yanelis Lara (CUB)	2:06.21	Chantee Earl (USA)	2:07.67
1500 metres	Fabiana Cristine da Silva (BRA)	4:16.07	Niuvis Pie (CUB)	4:18.22	Yahyma Millares (CUB)	4:22.48
3000 metres	Fabiana Cristine da Silva (BRA)	9:42.05	Julia Stamps (USA)	9:45.97	Yoenny Mayacen (CUB)	9:46.04
5000 metres	Yaremis Torres (CUB)	16:34.59	Erin Jones (USA)	16:35.68	Yailén García (CUB)	16:35.75
100 metres hurdles	Charmaine Walker (USA)	13.61	Nicole Hoxie (USA)	13.83	Katia Brito (CUB)	14.32
400 metres hurdles	Peta-Gaye Gayle (JAM)	57.50	Yasnay Lescay (CUB)	58.26	Nasha Neal (USA)	58.27
4 × 100 metres relay	United States; Angela Williams; Aleisha Latimer; Aleah Williams; Kinshasa Davis	44.02	Jamaica; Tulia Robinson; Aleen Bailey; Misrah Crooks; Maria Brown	44.63	Bahamas; Monica Rolle; Marcia Dorsett; Tamicka Clarke; Dewanna Wright	45.49
4 × 400 metres relay	Jamaica; Sashanie Simpson; Keasha Downer; Shellene Williams; Petagay Gayle	3:36.75	Cuba; Yudalis Díaz; Yaznai Lescay; Yanelis Lara; Mairelín Fuentes	3:36.96	United States; Ysanne Williams; Natasha Neal; Laila Brock; Carron Allen	3:38.97
5000 metres track walk	Aura Morales (MEX)	24:36.53	Lisa Kutzing (USA)	24:36.69	Gladys Criollo (ECU)	25:01.15
High jump	Niurka Lussón (CUB)	1.85	Whitney Evans (CAN)	1.82	Jessica Thompson (USA)	1.76
Pole vault	Karina Elstrom (USA)	3.70	Mari Lou Badillo (USA)	3.50	Alejandra Meza (MEX)	3.35
Long jump	Elva Goulbourne (JAM)	6.10	Keyon Soley (USA)	6.02	Shanelle Marshall (JAM)	5.98
Triple jump	Christine Simmons (USA)	13.22	Yuliana Pérez (CUB)	13.01	Yaquelín Iglesias (CUB)	12.85
Shot put	Seilala Sua (USA)	16.25	Antuanett Depreste (CUB)	15.28	Nicole Hicks (USA)	14.87
Discus throw	Seilala Sua (USA)	57.88	Krista Keir (USA)	50.00	Yuneidis Bonne (CUB)	49.88
Hammer throw	Yipsi Moreno (CUB)	55.74	Maureen Griffin (USA)	55.28	Dubraska Rodríguez (CUB)	47.48
Javelin throw	Osleidys Menéndez (CUB)	61.76	Emily Carlsten (USA)	53.10	Marisela Robles (DOM)	49.80
Heptathlon	Miroslava Ibarra (CUB)	5094	Judy Anderson (USA)	4950	Nicole Bethel (USA)	4892

== Medal table (unofficial) ==
* Host nation (Cuba)

Rank	Nation	Gold	Silver	Bronze	Total
1	United States	20	16	10	46
2	Cuba*	11	13	12	36
3	Canada	3	3	1	7
4	Brazil	3	2	3	8
4	Jamaica	3	2	3	8
6	Mexico	3	0	4	7
7	Bahamas	0	3	2	5
8	Argentina	0	1	1	2
8	Colombia	0	1	1	2
10	Barbados	0	1	0	1
10	Uruguay	0	1	0	1
12	Cayman Islands	0	0	2	2
12	Dominican Republic	0	0	2	2
14	Chile	0	0	1	1
14	Ecuador	0	0	1	1
Totals (15 entries)		43	43	43	129
