= 1996 World Junior Championships in Athletics – Women's 4 × 400 metres relay =

The women's 4x400 metres relay event at the 1996 World Junior Championships in Athletics was held in Sydney, Australia, at International Athletic Centre on 24 and 25 August.

== Medalists ==
Gold	Peggy Müller; Claudia Gesell; Doreen Harstick; Ulrike Urbansky; Germany
Silver	Medina Tudor; Anca Safta; Otilia Ruicu; Andrea Burlacu; Romania
Bronze	Jennifer Marshall; Tamsyn Lewis; Josephine Fowley; Rosemary Hayward; Australia

== Results ==
=== Final ===
25 August

Rank	Nation	Competitors	Time	Notes
1st place, gold medalist(s)	Germany	Peggy Müller; Claudia Gesell; Doreen Harstick; Ulrike Urbansky	3:31.12	
2nd place, silver medalist(s)	Romania	Medina Tudor; Anca Safta; Otilia Ruicu; Andrea Burlacu	3:32.16	
3rd place, bronze medalist(s)	Australia	Jennifer Marshall; Tamsyn Lewis; Josephine Fowley; Rosemary Hayward	3:32.47	
4	United States	Heather Hanchak; Tamieka Grizzle; Theodoesha Rivers; Suziann Reid	3:34.26	
5	China	Wu Wei; Bi Tanna; Chen Yuxiang; Li Jing	3:35.33	
6	Russia	Yuliya Nosova; Olga Sakharova; Yekaterina Solovyova; Yuliya Taranova	3:37.34	
	France	Sylviane Félix; Katiana Rene; Sylvanie Morandais; Cindy Ega	DQ	IAAF rule 170.6
	Jamaica	Michelle Burgher; Keasha Downer; Ronetta Smith; Tanya Jarrett	DQ	IAAF rule 170.6

=== Heats ===
24 August

==== Heat 1 ====
Rank	Nation	Competitors	Time	Notes
1	Australia	Renee Robson; Tamsyn Lewis; Jennifer Marshall; Josephine Fowley	3:37.75	Q
2	United States	Heather Hanchak; Tamieka Grizzle; Theodoesha Rivers; Suziann Reid	3:37.91	Q
3	Germany	Claudia Marx; Peggy Müller; Jennifer Vollrath; Ulrike Urbansky	3:38.26	Q
4	Yugoslavia	Jovana Miljković; Biljana Mitrović; Sanja Tripković; Jelena Stanisavljević	3:44.34	
5	Greece	Aryiró Tsoka; Chrísoula Goudenoúdhi; Anastasía Thomatdou; Kasiani Dimopoúlou	3:50.54	

==== Heat 2 ====
Rank	Nation	Competitors	Time	Notes
1	Romania	Medina Tudor; Anca Safta; Otilia Ruicu; Andrea Burlacu	3:38.55	Q
2	Russia	Yuliya Nosova; Olga Sakharova; Yekaterina Solovyova; Yuliya Taranova	3:39.84	Q
3	France	Sylviane Félix; Katiana Rene; Sylvanie Morandais; Cindy Ega	3:39.99	Q
4	Jamaica	Keasha Downer; Michelle Burgher; Ronetta Smith; Peta-Gaye Gayle	3:40.58	q
5	China	Wu Wei; Bi Tanna; Chen Yuxiang; Li Jing	3:41.97	q

== Participation ==
According to an unofficial count, 44 athletes from 10 countries participated in the event.

- Australia (5)
- China (4)
- France (4)
- Germany (6)
- Greece (4)
- Jamaica (5)
- Romania (4)
- Russia (4)
- United States (4)
- Yugoslavia (4)
