= 2001 Central American and Caribbean Championships in Athletics =

18th Central American and Caribbean Championships
- Dates: 20–22 July
- Host city: Guatemala City, Guatemala
- Venue: Estadio Mateo Flores
- Level: Senior
- Events: 45

The 2001 Central American and Caribbean Championships in Athletics were held at the Estadio Mateo Flores in Guatemala City, Guatemala between 20–22 July.

== Medal summary ==
Full results were published.

=== Men's events ===
Event	Gold		Silver		Bronze	
100 metres	Kim Collins; Saint Kitts and Nevis	10.04A CR	Julien Dunkley; Jamaica	10.35A	Jaycey Harper; Trinidad and Tobago	10.39A
200 metres	Kim Collins; Saint Kitts and Nevis	20.55A	Juan Pedro Toledo; Mexico	20.82A	Keita Cline; British Virgin Islands	20.88A
400 metres	Danny McFarlane; Jamaica	45.20A	Brandon Simpson; Jamaica	45.46A	Alejandro Cárdenas; Mexico	45.85A
800 metres	Norberto Téllez; Cuba	1:46.51A	Marvin Watts; Jamaica	1:47.14A	Simoncito Silvera; Venezuela	1:48.12A
1500 metres	Salvador Miranda; Mexico	3:46.78A	Freddy González; Venezuela	3:47.04A	Juan Luis Barrios; Mexico	3:47.62A
5000 metres	Teodoro Vega; Mexico	14:00.46A	Alejandro Suárez; Mexico	14:11.76A	Freddy González; Venezuela	14:25.84A
10000 metres	Isaac Gómez; Mexico	30:40.96A	Jonathan Morales; Mexico	30:41.99A	José Amado García; Guatemala	30:53.52A
Half marathon	Procopio Franco; Mexico	1:06:33A	Francisco Bautista; Mexico	1:06:33A	José de Jesús; Mexico	1:06:39A
3000 metres steeplechase	Salvador Miranda; Mexico	8:50.36A	Néstor Nieves; Venezuela	9:01.48A	Alex Greaux; Puerto Rico	9:03.52A
110 metres hurdles	Maurice Wignall; Jamaica	13.76A	Gabriel Burnett; Barbados	13.82A	Stephen Jones; Barbados	13.83A
400 metres hurdles	Mario Watts; Jamaica	49.31A	Jorge Moreno; Cuba	50.05A	Oscar Juanz; Mexico	50.11A
4 × 100 metres relay	Bahamas; Jamial Rolle; Andrew Tynes; Iram Lewis; Brian Babbs	39.27A	Venezuela; Juan Morillo; José Peña; José Carabalí; Ellis Ollarves	39.31A (NR)	Puerto Rico; Carlos Santos; Jorge Richardson; Osvaldo Nieves; Jesús Carrión	39.63A
4 × 400 metres relay	Jamaica; Orville Taylor; Brandon Simpson; Mario Watts; Danny McFarlane	3:00.83A CR	Mexico; Alejandro Cárdenas; Roberto Carbajal; Juan Pedro Toledo; Oscar Juanz	3:03.29A	Venezuela; Jonathan Palma; Nilson Palacios; Luis Luna; William Hernández	3:06.93A
20 km road walk	Luis Fernando García; Guatemala	1:25:44A	Mario Iván Flores; Mexico	1:25:45A	Julio René Martínez; Guatemala	1:29:47A
High jump	Henderson Dottin; Barbados	2.20A	Raúl Touset; Cuba	2.20A	Damon Thompson; Barbados	2.15A
Pole vault	Dominic Johnson; Saint Lucia	5.20A	Ricardo Diez; Venezuela; Jorge Tienda; Mexico	5.05A		
Long jump	Kareem Streete-Thompson; Cayman Islands	7.97A	Leevan Sands; Bahamas	7.85A	Chris Wright; Bahamas	7.75A
Triple jump	Brian Wellman; Bermuda	17.24A CR	Yoandri Betanzos; Cuba	16.64A	Gregory Hughes; Barbados	15.99A
Shot put	Yojer Medina; Venezuela	18.86A	Alexis Paumier; Cuba	18.66A	Dave Stoute; Trinidad and Tobago	17.79A
Discus throw	Michel Hemmings; Cuba	57.69A	Alfredo Romero; Puerto Rico	52.04A	Mauricio Serna; Mexico	50.50A
Hammer throw	Yosmel Montes; Cuba	69.24A	Santos Vega; Puerto Rico	63.11A	Aldo Bello; Venezuela	61.80A
Javelin throw	Manuel Fuenmayor; Venezuela	68.73A	Rigoberto Calderón; Nicaragua	67.00A	Javier Ugarte; Nicaragua	62.81A
Decathlon	Maurice Smith; Jamaica	7755A CR	Luiggy Llanos; Puerto Rico	7272A	Yonelvis Águila; Cuba	7196A

=== Women's events ===
Event	Gold		Silver		Bronze	
100 metres	Liliana Allen; Mexico	11.32A	Astia Walker; Jamaica	11.41A	Vírgen Benavides; Cuba	11.48A
200 metres	Cydonie Mothersille; Cayman Islands	22.54A	Liliana Allen; Mexico	23.13A	Vírgen Benavides; Cuba	23.36A
400 metres	Michelle Burgher; Jamaica	53.04A	Allison Beckford; Jamaica	53.28A	Beatriz Cruz; Puerto Rico	53.90A
800 metres	Yanelis Lara; Cuba	2:01.86A	Michelle Ballentine; Jamaica	2:02.11A	Sandra Moya; Puerto Rico	2:05.45A
1500 metres	Yanelis Lara; Cuba	4:32.37A	Margarita Tapia; Mexico	4:36.55A	Gabriela Traña; Costa Rica	4:40.73A
5000 metres	América Mateos; Mexico	16:27.59A CR	Margarita Tapia; Mexico	16:28.76A	Elsa Monterroso; Guatemala	17:17.00A
10000 metres	América Mateos; Mexico	34:42.91A	Norelis Lugo; Venezuela	36:29.09A	Ileana Arroyo; Puerto Rico	37:48.2A
Half marathon	Mariela González; Cuba	1:18:33A	Liliana Merlo; Mexico	1:18:47A	Guadelupe García; Mexico	1:22:18A
100 metres hurdles	Dainelky Pérez; Cuba	13.31A	Astia Walker; Jamaica	13.32A	Keitha Moseley; Barbados	13.74A
400 metres hurdles	Yvonne Harrison; Puerto Rico	55.86A	Peta-Gaye Gayle; Jamaica	55.92A	Yamelis Ortiz; Puerto Rico	57.26A
4 × 100 metres relay	Jamaica; Astia Walker; Nadine Palmer; Peta-Gaye Barrett; Elva Goulbourne	43.83A CR	Cuba; Katiuska Pérez; Yudalis Díaz; Dainelky Pérez; Vírgen Benavides	45.09A	Guatemala; Rossana Rodríguez; Carolina Castellanos; Denisse Jerez; María José Paiz	50.08A
4 × 400 metres relay	Jamaica; Peta-Gaye Gayle; Michelle Burgher; Michelle Ballentine; Allison Beckford	3:33.96A	Puerto Rico; Militza Castro; Beatriz Cruz; Yamelis Ortiz; Yvonne Harrison	3:36.40A	Guatemala; Rossana Rodríguez; Luz Patricia Valenzuela; Sandra Oliveros; Ana Lucía Hurtado	3:58.03A
10 km road walk	Rosario Sánchez; Mexico	45:47A CR	Teresita Collado; Guatemala	47.36A	Ivis Martínez; El Salvador	48:02A
High jump	Levern Spencer; Saint Lucia	1.80A	Romary Rifka; Mexico	1.75A	Lauren Maul; Barbados	1.75A
Pole vault	Katiuska Pérez; Cuba	3.85A CR	Lorena Espinoza; Mexico	3.45A	Michelle Rivera; El Salvador	3.30A
Long jump	Elva Goulbourne; Jamaica	6.77A CR	Trecia Smith; Jamaica	6.68A	Betsabé Berríos; Puerto Rico	6.23A
Triple jump	Trecia Smith; Jamaica	14.12A	Suzette Lee; Jamaica	13.75A	Yusmay Bicet; Cuba	13.62A
Shot put	Misleydis González; Cuba	17.20A	Neolanis Suárez; Venezuela	13.90A	Shernelle Nicholls; Barbados	13.49A
Discus throw	Yania Ferrales; Cuba	56.34A	Neolanis Suárez; Venezuela	48.64A	Chafree Bain; Bahamas	46.25A
Hammer throw	Yunaika Crawford; Cuba	58.68A CR	Nancy Guillén; El Salvador	58.24A	Violeta Guzmán; Mexico	54.92A
Javelin throw	Laverne Eve; Bahamas	59.30A	Noraida Bicet; Cuba	57.04A	Dalila Rugama; Nicaragua	42.19A
Heptathlon	Sheila Acosta; Puerto Rico	5029A	Juana Espinal; Dominican Republic	4836A	Beatriz Pompa; Mexico	4825A

A = affected by altitude

== Medal table ==
Rank	Nation	Gold	Silver	Bronze	Total
1	Cuba (CUB)	11	6	4	21
2	Jamaica (JAM)	10	10	0	20
3	Mexico (MEX)	9	12	8	29
4	Venezuela (VEN)	2	7	4	13
5	Puerto Rico (PUR)	2	4	7	13
6	Bahamas (BAH)	2	1	2	5
7	Cayman Islands (CAY)	2	0	0	2
7	Saint Kitts and Nevis (SKN)	2	0	0	2
7	Saint Lucia (LCA)	2	0	0	2
10	Barbados (BAR)	1	1	6	8
11	Guatemala (GUA)	1	1	5	7
12	Bermuda (BER)	1	0	0	1
13	El Salvador (ESA)	0	1	2	3
13	Nicaragua (NIC)	0	1	2	3
15	Dominican Republic (DOM)	0	1	0	1
16	Trinidad and Tobago (TTO)	0	0	2	2
17	British Virgin Islands (IVB)	0	0	1	1
17	Costa Rica (CRC)	0	0	1	1
Totals (18 entries)		45	45	44	134

== See also ==
- 2001 in athletics (track and field)
