= 1997 CARIFTA Games =

XXVI CARIFTA Games
- Dates: April 4–6
- Host city: Bridgetown, Barbados
- Venue: Barbados National Stadium
- Level: Junior and Youth
- Events: 58 (33 junior, 25 youth)
- Participation: about 271 (147 junior, 124 youth) athletes from about 19 nations

The 26th CARIFTA Games was held at the National Stadium in Bridgetown, Barbados, on April 4–6, 1997.

== Participation (unofficial) ==
Detailed result lists can be found on the "World Junior Athletics History" website. An unofficial count yields the number of about 270 athletes (146 junior (under-20) and 124 youth (under-17)) from about 19 countries: Antigua and Barbuda (8), Aruba (1), Bahamas (27), Barbados (41), Bermuda (11), British Virgin Islands (2), Cayman Islands (5), Dominica (6), Grenada (10), Guadeloupe (16), Guyana (11), Jamaica (53), Martinique (30), Saint Kitts and Nevis (3), Saint Lucia (3), Saint Vincent and the Grenadines (7), Suriname (1), Trinidad and Tobago (29), US Virgin Islands (7).

== Austin Sealy Award ==
The Austin Sealy Trophy for the most outstanding athlete of the games was awarded for the first time jointly to two athletes: Aleen Bailey and Roy Bailey, both from Jamaica. Aleen Bailey won a gold (200m) and a silver medal (100m), while Roy Bailey won 3 gold medals (100m, 200m, and 4 × 100m relay). Both athletes competed in the junior (U-20) category.

== Medal summary ==
Medal winners are published by category: Boys under 20 (Junior), Girls under 20 (Junior), Boys under 17 (Youth), and Girls under 17 (Youth). Complete results can be found on the "World Junior Athletics History" website.

=== Boys under 20 (Junior) ===
Event	Gold		Silver		Bronze	
100 metres (0.0 m/s)	Roy Bailey (JAM)	10.40	Dree Ryan (TRI)	10.86	Dimitri Demonière (MTQ)	10.88
200 metres (1.3 m/s)	Roy Bailey (JAM)	20.48	Steve Slowly (JAM)	20.95	Cédric Gold-Dalg (MTQ)	21.18
400 metres	Avard Moncur (BAH)	46.90	Michael Campbell (JAM)	47.33	Chris Brown (BAH)	47.46
800 metres	Dwayne Miller (JAM)	1:54.78	Carlon Harrison (JAM)	1:54.79	Chris Brown (BAH)	1:56.59
1500 metres	Omar Brooks (JAM)	4:01.4	Carlon Harrison (JAM)	4:02.4	Elliot Mason (ATG)	4:03.0
5000 metres	Omar Brooks (JAM)	16:05.04	Narvin Beharry (TRI)	16:13.24	Jermain Bijlhout (SUR)	16:17.52
110 metres hurdles (8.3 m/s)	Stephen Jones (BAR)	14.19w	Omari Francis (BAH)	14.61w	Nester Keith (JAM)	14.64w
400 metres hurdles	David Lloyd (JAM)	53.43	Ednol Rolle (BAH)	54.28	Seth Billy (BAR)	54.62
High jump	Kevin Cumberbatch (BAR)	2.08	Kerry Edwards (TRI)	2.06	Micky Ruben (TRI)	1.95
Pole vault	Omar Gardiner (JAM)	4.31	Dion Kong (TRI)	3.65	Jabari Ennis (JAM)	3.65
Long jump	Sébastien Pincemail (GLP)	7.45	Steve Slowly (JAM)	7.23	Maurice Clarke (BAR)	7.21
Triple jump	Sébastien Pincemail (GLP)	15.87w	Randy Lewis (GRN)	15.66w	Godfrey Rahming (BAH)	15.22w
Shot put	Dave Stoute (TRI)	14.43	Rory Marsh (JAM)	14.18	Claston Bernard (JAM)	13.68
Discus throw	Rory Marsh (JAM)	43.34	David Bissoly (MTQ)	43.02	Jamico Sands (BAH)	39.68
Javelin throw	Brian Husbands (BAR)	55.60	Mike Modeste (GRN)	55.38	Terry Nurse (BAR)	53.78
4 × 100 metres relay	Jamaica; Dwight Thomas Roy Bailey	39.87	Guadeloupe	41.15	Martinique	41.44
4 × 400 metres relay	Jamaica	3:09.07	Bahamas	3:12.67	Trinidad and Tobago	3:18.16

=== Girls under 20 (Junior) ===
Event	Gold		Silver		Bronze	
100 metres (0.0 m/s)	Cydonie Mothersill (CAY)	11.54	Aleen Bailey (JAM)	11.60	Sonia Williams (ATG)	11.83
200 metres (0.9 m/s)	Aleen Bailey (JAM)	23.65	Chanelle Marshall (JAM)	23.83	Cynthia Octavia (MTQ)	23.88
400 metres	Tanya Oxley (BAR)	54.64	Keisha Downer (JAM)	55.31	Ronetta Smith (JAM)	55.78
800 metres	Pechana Tomlin (JAM)	2:11.22	Janelle Inniss (BAR)	2:12.43	Aileen Smith (JAM)	2:12.52
1500 metres	Pechana Tomlin (JAM)	4:44.56	Aileen Smith (JAM)	4:47.78	Anisha Humes (TRI)	4:48.56
3000 metres	Janill Williams (ATG)	10:23.26	Tameica Brown (JAM)	10:28.75	Stacey Quashie (ATG)	10:31.62
100 metres hurdles (2.7 m/s)	Susanne Dickenson (JAM)	14.10w	Cynthia Octavia (MTQ)	14.19w	Stacia Small (BAR)	14.59w
400 metres hurdles	Peta-Gaye Gayle (JAM)	59.28	Sylvanie Morandais (GLP)	62.62	Julia Lewis (BAR)	63.03
High jump	Daneesh McIntosh (BAH)	1.68	Julia Lewis (BAR)	1.68	Christine Brown (JAM); Bernice Penn (BAH)	1.60
Long jump	Marie-Hélène Carabin (GLP)	6.08	Chanelle Marshall (JAM)	6.07	Anna-Lee Walcott (TRI)	5.83
Triple jump	Christine Brown (JAM)	12.56	Stéphanie Xavier (GLP)	12.55	Chrissy Zabeau (GLP)	12.49
Shot put	Christelle Bornil (MTQ)	15.25	Doris Thompson (BAH)	14.34	Sandrine André (GUY)	12.48
Discus throw	Christelle Bornil (MTQ)	48.36	Béatrice Louisy-Louis (MTQ)	43.56	Tanya Thomas (JAM)	43.06
Javelin throw	Marie-Christine Lincertin (GLP)	40.80	Nadine Clarke (JAM)	40.34	Béatrice Louisy-Louis (MTQ)	39.96
4 × 100 metres relay	Jamaica; Lisa Sharpe Veronica Campbell	45.27	Barbados	46.19	Bahamas	46.28
4 × 400 metres relay	Jamaica	3:39.30	Barbados	3:45.69	Trinidad and Tobago	3:48.43

=== Boys under 17 (Youth) ===
Event	Gold		Silver		Bronze	
100 metres (0.0 m/s)	Michael Frater (JAM)	11.04	Kevin Bartlett (BAR)	11.09	Rodney Pitts (ISV)	11.09
200 metres (1.4 m/s)	André Murray (JAM)	22.06	Kevin Bartlett (BAR)	22.18	Richard Nicely (JAM)	22.32
400 metres	Wilan Louis (BAR)	48.75	Ryan Smith (BAR)	49.12	Gregory McFarlane (JAM)	49.38
800 metres	Aldwyn Sappleton (JAM)	1:58.59	Xavier Larifla (GLP)	2:01.53	Roland Hemmings (TRI)	2:02.38
1500 metres	Aldwyn Sappleton (JAM)	4:14.35	Xavier Larifla (GLP)	4:18.83	Clifford Campbell (JAM)	4:22.29
100 metres hurdles (5.2 m/s)	Richard Nicely (JAM)	13.33w	Brent Harry (TRI)	13.65w	Ricardo Melbourne (JAM)	13.76w
400 metres hurdles	Ryan Smith (BAR)	54.64	Ricardo Melbourne (JAM)	55.66	Jason Haynes (BAR)	57.40
High jump	Yohan Virapin (MTQ)	1.98	Samuel Prescod (BAR)	1.95	Nicolas Bellemare (MTQ)	1.90
Long jump	Kevin Bartlett (BAR)	7.05	Paul Thompson (JAM)	6.93	Marc Marsillon (MTQ)	6.81
Triple jump	Leevan Sands (BAH)	14.73	Paul Thompson (JAM)	14.43	Kevin Bartlett (BAR)	14.38
Shot put	Godfrey Ellis (BAH)	15.04	Dave Vainqueur (GLP)	14.42	Stephenson Carter (BAR)	13.18
Discus throw	Jean François Aurokiom (MTQ)	41.12	Damion Cameron (JAM)	40.76	Godfrey Ellis (BAH)	40.62
Javelin throw	Sheldon Black (TRI)	49.96	Alroy Peters (GRN)	49.42	Daniel Bellerophon (MTQ)	48.14

=== Girls under 17 (Youth) ===
Event	Gold		Silver		Bronze	
100 metres (0.8 m/s)	Fana Ashby (TRI)	12.03	Marcia Dorsett (BAH)	12.04	Rodneshya Pitts (ISV)	12.15
200 metres (0.3 m/s)	Fana Ashby (TRI)	24.23	Lucyann Richards (BAR)	24.31	Marcia Dorsett (BAH)	24.46
400 metres	Yanique Chambers (JAM)	54.76	Lucyann Richards (BAR)	55.14	Hazel-Ann Regis (GRN)	56.04
800 metres	Tameica Brown (JAM)	2:13.29	Sheena Gooding (BAR)	2:13.21	Letitia Gilkes (BAR)	2:14.56
1500 metres	Letitia Gilkes (BAR)	4:48.42	Tameica Brown (JAM)	4:50.31	Jascinth Salmon (JAM)	4:51.62
100 metres hurdles (4.4 m/s)	Kareecia Thompson (JAM)	13.85w	Cindy Mondelice (GLP)	14.12w	Keitha Moseley (BAR)	14.30w
300 metres hurdles	Renee Layne (BAR)	43.17	Kareecia Thompson (JAM)	43.69	Authea Chambers (JAM)	43.94
High jump	Keitha Moseley (BAR)	1.65	Janice Ezegbunam (BAH)	1.65	Raneika Bean (BER)	1.65
Long jump	Authea Chambers (JAM)	5.62	Kelsie Johnson (BAH)	5.46	Aurélie Talbot (GLP)	5.38
Shot put	Shanell Andrews (BAH)	11.90	Latanya Dickinson (BER)	10.72	Evia Morrison (BAH)	10.28
Discus throw	Shanell Andrews (BAH)	34.18	Kasheta Smith (JAM)	34.10	Antoinette Vernon (CAY)	30.84
Javelin throw	Francette Pognon (MTQ)	43.66	Séphora Bissoly (MTQ)	39.18	Nikkisha Maynard (BAR)	37.68

== Medal table (unofficial) ==
* Host nation (Barbados)

Rank	Nation	Gold	Silver	Bronze	Total
1	Jamaica (JAM)	27	20	13	60
2	Barbados (BAR)*	10	11	11	32
3	Bahamas (BAH)	6	7	9	22
4	Martinique (MTQ)	5	4	8	17
5	Guadeloupe (GLP)	4	7	2	13
6	Trinidad and Tobago (TTO)	4	5	6	15
7	Antigua and Barbuda (ATG)	1	0	3	4
8	Cayman Islands (CAY)	1	0	1	2
9	Grenada (GRN)	0	3	1	4
10	Bermuda (BER)	0	1	1	2
11	U.S. Virgin Islands (VIR)	0	0	2	2
12	Guyana (GUY)	0	0	1	1
12	Suriname (SUR)	0	0	1	1
Totals (13 entries)		58	58	59	175
