= 2001 European Athletics U23 Championships – Women's 400 metres hurdles =

The women's 400 metres hurdles event at the 2001 European Athletics U23 Championships was held in Amsterdam, Netherlands, at Olympisch Stadion on 13 and 14 July.

== Medalists ==
Gold	Sylvanie Morandais; France
Silver	Aleksandra Pielużek; Poland
Bronze	Irēna Žauna; Latvia

== Results ==
=== Final ===
14 July

Rank	Name	Nationality	Time	Notes
1st place, gold medalist(s)	Sylvanie Morandais	France	56.30	
2nd place, silver medalist(s)	Aleksandra Pielużek	Poland	56.51	
3rd place, bronze medalist(s)	Irēna Žauna	Latvia	57.03	
4	Marjolein de Jong	Netherlands	57.26	
5	Alena Rücklová	Czech Republic	58.28	
6	Erica Martensson	Sweden	58.49	
7	Karolina Tłustochowska	Poland	58.95	
8	Marina Shiyan	Russia	59.75	

=== Heats ===
13 July
Qualified: first 3 in each heat and 2 best to the Final

==== Heat 1 ====
Rank	Name	Nationality	Time	Notes
1	Sylvanie Morandais	France	57.16	Q
2	Irēna Žauna	Latvia	57.23	Q
3	Alena Rücklová	Czech Republic	58.32	Q
4	Marina Shiyan	Russia	58.34	q
5	Karolina Tłustochowska	Poland	58.78	q
6	Tina Kron	Germany	59.24	
	Tracey Duncan	United Kingdom	DNF	

==== Heat 2 ====
Rank	Name	Nationality	Time	Notes
1	Marjolein de Jong	Netherlands	57.66	Q
2	Aleksandra Pielużek	Poland	58.56	Q
3	Erica Martensson	Sweden	59.07	Q
4	Heidi Trollsås	Norway	59.38	
5	Benedetta Ceccarelli	Italy	59.51	
6	Olivia Abderrhamane	France	59.90	
7	Elodie Cruchant	France	60.12	

== Participation ==
According to an unofficial count, 14 athletes from 11 countries participated in the event.

- Czech Republic (1)
- France (3)
- Germany (1)
- Italy (1)
- Latvia (1)
- Netherlands (1)
- Norway (1)
- Poland (2)
- Russia (1)
- Sweden (1)
- United Kingdom (1)
