= 1998 World Junior Championships in Athletics – Women's 4 × 400 metres relay =

The women's 4x400 metres relay event at the 1998 World Junior Championships in Athletics was held in Annecy, France, at Parc des Sports on 1 and 2 August.

== Medalists ==
Gold	Patricia Hall; Peta-Gaye Gayle; Keasha Downer; Allison Beckford; Jamaica
Silver	Svetlana Pospelova; Olga Mikayeva; Olesya Zykina; Natalya Nazarova; Russia
Bronze	Mikele Barber; Myra Combs; Demetria Washington; Nakiya Johnson; United States

== Results ==
=== Final ===
2 August

Rank	Nation	Competitors	Time	Notes
1st place, gold medalist(s)	Jamaica	Patricia Hall; Peta-Gaye Gayle; Keasha Downer; Allison Beckford	3:32.29	
2nd place, silver medalist(s)	Russia	Svetlana Pospelova; Olga Mikayeva; Olesya Zykina; Natalya Nazarova	3:32.35	
3rd place, bronze medalist(s)	United States	Mikele Barber; Myra Combs; Demetria Washington; Nakiya Johnson	3:32.85	
4	China	Sun Hong Wei; Liu Qifang; Lu Minling; Li Yulian	3:37.10	
5	Romania	Otilia Lungu; Mihaela Stăncescu; Medina Tudor; Alina Rîpanu	3:37.41	
6	Germany	Nadine Weissmann; Kerstin Seitz; Julia Wollstadt; Kristin Götz	3:37.47	
7	Australia	Kylie Wheeler; Sonia Brito; Rosemary Hayward; Jennifer Marshall	3:37.60	
8	France	Audrey Rouyer; Olivia Abderrhamane; Dado Kamissoko; Laure Kouassi	3:39.18	

=== Heats ===
1 August

==== Heat 1 ====
Rank	Nation	Competitors	Time	Notes
1	Jamaica	Shellene Williams; Sashanie Simpson; Patricia Hall; Allison Beckford	3:37.19	Q
2	China	Sun Hong Wei; Liu Qifang; Lu Minling; Li Yulian	3:37.90	Q
3	Australia	Kylie Wheeler; Sonia Brito; Rosemary Hayward; Jennifer Marshall	3:38.41	Q
4	Germany	Kerstin Seitz; Julia Wollstadt; Saskia Dickhaut; Nadine Weissmann	3:39.27	q
5	Croatia	Kristina Perica; Suzana Rubin; Bozidarka Crncan; Helena Janecic	3:47.48	

==== Heat 2 ====
Rank	Nation	Competitors	Time	Notes
1	United States	Mikele Barber; Crystal Cox; Demetria Washington; Nakiya Johnson	3:33.16	Q
2	Russia	Svetlana Pospelova; Olesya Zykina; Olga Mikayeva; Natalya Nazarova	3:37.15	Q
3	Romania	Otilia Lungu; Mihaela Stăncescu; Medina Tudor; Alina Rîpanu	3:38.40	Q
4	France	Audrey Rouyer; Olivia Abderrhamane; Dado Kamissoko; Laure Kouassi	3:38.98	q
5	South Africa	Vanessa Becker; Stephanie Schoeman; Yolandé Neethling; Estie Wittstock	3:39.44	
6	Italy	Sonia Orfei; Benedetta Ceccarelli; Barbara Bello; Alexia Oberstolz	3:43.26	

== Participation ==
According to an unofficial count, 48 athletes from 11 countries participated in the event.

- Australia (4)
- China (4)
- Croatia (4)
- France (4)
- Germany (5)
- Italy (4)
- Jamaica (6)
- Romania (4)
- Russia (4)
- South Africa (4)
- United States (5)
