= 1996 CARIFTA Games =

XXV CARIFTA Games
- Dates: April 6–8
- Host city: Kingston, Jamaica
- Level: Junior and Youth
- Events: 58
- Participation: about 272 athletes from about 23 nations

The 25th CARIFTA Games was held in Kingston, Jamaica, on April 6–8, 1996. An appraisal of the results has been given on the occasion of 40th anniversary of the games.

== Participation (unofficial) ==
Detailed result lists can be found on the "World Junior Athletics History" website. An unofficial count yields the number of about 272 athletes (152 junior (under-20) and 120 youth (under-17)) from about 23 countries: Antigua and Barbuda (8), Aruba (4), Bahamas (23), Barbados (28), Belize (2), Bermuda (12), British Virgin Islands (3), Cayman Islands (13), Dominica (2), French Guiana (1), Grenada (9), Guadeloupe (20), Guyana (2), Jamaica (56), Martinique (15), Montserrat (4), Netherlands Antilles (4), Saint Kitts and Nevis (5), Saint Lucia (1), Saint Vincent and the Grenadines (1), Trinidad and Tobago (30), Turks and Caicos Islands (11), US Virgin Islands (18).

== Austin Sealy Award ==
The Austin Sealy Trophy for the most outstanding athlete of the games was awarded to Cydonie Mothersill from the Cayman Islands. She won 2 gold medals (100m, and 200m) in the junior (U-20) category.

== Medal summary ==
Medal winners are published by category: Boys under 20 (Junior), Girls under 20 (Junior), Boys under 17 (Youth), and Girls under 17 (Youth). Complete results can be found on the "World Junior Athletics History" website.

=== Boys under 20 (Junior) ===
Event	Gold		Silver		Bronze	
100 metres (0.4 m/s)	Lindel Frater (JAM)	10.50	Ruddy Zami (GLP)	10.51	Roy Bailey (JAM)	10.65
200 metres (-3.2 m/s)	Roy Bailey (JAM)	21.51	David Spencer (JAM)	21.70	Ruddy Zami (GLP)	21.81
400 metres	Michael Campbell (JAM)	46.92	Avard Moncur (BAH)	47.10	Addis Huyler (BAH)	48.21
800 metres	Winston Aberdeen (TRI)	1:52.65	Dwayne Miller (JAM)	1:53.48	Eugène Miath (GLP)	1:54.90
1500 metres	Winston Aberdeen (TRI)	4:01.10	Oral Williamson (JAM)	4:02.82	Marlon Tomlinson (JAM)	4:03.13
5000 metres	Damian Sobers (TRI)	15:38.32	Oral Williamson (JAM)	15:41.45	Narvin Beharry (TRI)	15:56.01
110 metres hurdles (-4.0 m/s)	Stephen Jones (BAR)	14.86	Agarette Evans (BAH)	15.07	Désiré Delric (MTQ)	15.18
400 metres hurdles	Kurt Duncan (JAM)	52.32	Kwesi Davis (JAM)	54.05	Jake Belgrave (BAR)	54.24
High jump	Enrico Gordon (JAM)	2.10	Kerry Edwards (TRI)	2.07	Ryan Chambers (JAM)	2.07
Pole vault	Dion Kong (TRI)	3.80	Robert Pantry (BAH)	3.37	Fenton McDuffus (JAM)	3.17
Long jump	Sébastien Pincemail (GLP)	7.95	Mervin Swaby (JAM)	7.92	Allen Mortimer (BAH)	7.90
Triple jump	Sébastien Pincemail (GLP)	15.60	Allen Mortimer (BAH)	15.56	Randy Lewis (GRN)	14.97
Shot put	Dave Stoute (TRI)	14.51	Dereck Flowers (BAH)	13.46	Ahville Black (JAM)	12.95
Discus throw	Ahville Black (JAM)	43.52	Rory Marsh (JAM)	41.48	Luciano Saint-Val (MTQ)	39.74
Javelin throw	Coyotito Gray (BAH)	58.38	Marcellin Delphine (MTQ)	57.86	Moise Louisy-Louis (MTQ)	57.48
4 × 100 metres relay	Jamaica	40.60	Guadeloupe	41.09	Bahamas	41.60
4 × 400 metres relay	Jamaica	3:09.90	Bahamas	3:10.01	Trinidad and Tobago	3:13.45

=== Girls under 20 (Junior) ===
Event	Gold		Silver		Bronze	
100 metres (0.9 m/s)	Cydonie Mothersill (CAY)	11.35	Peta-Gaye Dowdie (JAM)	11.44	Maria Brown (JAM)	11.48
200 metres (-4.4 m/s)	Cydonie Mothersill (CAY)	23.77	Peta-Gaye Dowdie (JAM)	24.01	Sarah Patterson (JAM)	24.45
400 metres	Sherline Williams (BAR)	54.11	Michelle Burgher (JAM)	54.36	Alicia Tyson (TRI)	55.54
800 metres	Sherline Williams (BAR)	2:11.31	Mashire Harrison (JAM)	2:13.00	Vernae Ingram (BER)	2:13.86
1500 metres	Vernae Ingram (BER)	5:12.54	Petrona McClymont (JAM)	5:12.98	Bobbette Stewart (JAM)	5:14.20
3000 metres	Tameica Brown (JAM)	10:31.03	Keisha Gray (TRI)	10:31.16	Petrona McClymont (JAM)	10:33.24
100 metres hurdles (-6.2 m/s)	Tulia Robinson (JAM)	15.17	Annetta Whyte (JAM)	15.22	Makeda Prime (TRI)	15.56
400 metres hurdles	Michelle Burgher (JAM)	59.98	Peta-Gaye Gayle (JAM)	60.03	Sylvanie Morandais (GLP)	61.66
High jump	Keisha Spencer (JAM)	1.76	Daneesh McIntosh (BAH)	1.73	Tanya Wildgoose (BAH)	1.70
Long jump	Dolette Blake (JAM)	6.08	Nathalie Smith (BAR)	5.74	Marie-Hélène Carabin (GLP)	5.72
Triple jump	Christine Brown (JAM)	12.80	Eugénie Elisabeth (GUF)	12.67	Nathalie Smith (BAR)	12.01
Shot put	Doris Thompson (BAH)	14.18	Christelle Bornil (MTQ)	14.15	Rhonda Hackett (TRI)	13.64
Discus throw	Christelle Bornil (MTQ)	44.04	Béatrice Louisy-Louis (MTQ)	42.86	Rhonda Hackett (TRI)	39.02
Javelin throw	Nasha Belfon (GRN)	39.76	Béatrice Louisy-Louis (MTQ)	39.44	Doris Thompson (BAH)	38.96
4 × 100 metres relay	Jamaica	44.24	Trinidad and Tobago	46.22	Guadeloupe	46.31
4 × 400 metres relay	Jamaica	3:39.87	Trinidad and Tobago	3:42.47	Barbados	3:43.28

=== Boys under 17 (Youth) ===
Event	Gold		Silver		Bronze	
100 metres (-0.4 m/s)	Dave Vainqueur (GLP)	11.01	Tariq Hewey (BER)	11.05	Ryan Clarke (JAM)	11.11
200 metres (-6.0 m/s)	Kayode Farrell (TRI)	23.00	Tariq Hewey (BER)	23.06	O'Dell Taylor (TRI)	23.11
400 metres	O'Neil Wright (JAM)	49.03	O'Dell Taylor (TRI)	49.92	Tristan Dickson (ATG)	49.99
800 metres	Carlon Harrison (JAM)	1:56.53	Presley Cherubin (BAR)	1:58.85	Lorris Adams (BAR)	2:00.52
1500 metres	Carlon Harrison (JAM)	4:06.61	Dorlan Jacobs (ATG)	4:10.55	Kadian Flemming (JAM)	4:13.57
100 metres hurdles (-5.2 m/s)	Quayne Baccas (JAM)	13.52	Ryan Clarke (JAM)	13.83	Didier Beaunol-Richard (MTQ)	13.94
400 metres hurdles	O'Neil Wright (JAM)	54.07	Quayne Baccas (JAM)	55.63	Kevin Cumberbatch (BAR)	55.64
High jump	Kevin Cumberbatch (BAR)	2.05	Yohan Virapin (MTQ)	1.99	Ricky Nelson (ARU)	1.96
Long jump	Maurice Clarke (BAR)	6.85	Dwight Barrett (JAM)	6.71	Antonio Saunders (BAH)	6.68
Triple jump	Didier Beaunol-Richard (MTQ)	14.14	Aundre Edwards (JAM)	13.80	Maurice Clarke (BAR)	13.33
Shot put	Dave Vainqueur (GLP)	14.33	Sheldon Lewis (JAM)	11.78	Ronnie Mendoza (BAR)	11.74
Discus throw	Ronnie Mendoza (BAR)	39.16	Sheldon Lewis (JAM)	39.10	Terry Nurse (BAR)	38.22
Javelin throw	Elarius Frank (GRN)	53.30	Richard Rock (BAR)	51.54	Edward Cartwright (BAH)	48.74

=== Girls under 17 (Youth) ===
Event	Gold		Silver		Bronze	
100 metres	Aleen Bailey (JAM)	11.85	Marcia Dorsett (BAH)	12.00	Fana Ashby (TRI)	12.22
200 metres (-5.1 m/s)	Aleen Bailey (JAM)	24.88	Lucyann Richards (BAR)	25.46	Keisha Robb (JAM)	25.50
400 metres	Gabriella Edwards (TRI)	54.49	Lucyann Richards (BAR)	55.47	Keisha Downer (JAM)	55.92
800 metres	Janelle Inniss (BAR)	2:11.81	Keisha Gray (TRI)	2:12.28	Sheena Gooding (BAR)	2:12.35
1500 metres	Janelle Inniss (BAR)	4:44.59	Sheena Gooding (BAR)	4:46.78	Tameica Brown (JAM)	4:49.18
100 metres hurdles (-4.8 m/s)	Tiana Burke (JAM)	14.3	Keitha Moseley (BAR)	14.7	Cindy Mondelice (GLP)	14.9
300 metres hurdles	Andrea Bliss (JAM)	43.6	Lucyann Richards (BAR)	44.5	Alicia Cave (TRI)	45.2
High jump	Keitha Moseley (BAR)	1.69	Jessica Pina (ARU)	1.66	Shelly-Ann Gallimore (JAM)	1.63
Long jump	Anna-Lee Walcott (TRI)	5.72	Shelly-Ann Gallimore (JAM)	5.45	Onika James (TRI)	5.32
Shot put	Shanell Andrews (BAH)	11.32	Joëlle Julianne (MTQ)	11.26	Sandrine André (GUY)	10.61
Discus throw	Dagira Gordon (JAM)	36.22	Joëlle Julianne (MTQ)	35.64	Chafree Bain (BAH)	31.84
Javelin throw	Francette Pognon (MTQ)	38.94	Anna-Lee Walcott (TRI)	36.28	Roshanda Robinson (BAH)	32.92

== Medal table (unofficial) ==
* Host nation (Jamaica)

Rank	Nation	Gold	Silver	Bronze	Total
1	Jamaica (JAM)*	26	21	15	62
2	Barbados (BAR)	9	8	9	26
3	Trinidad and Tobago (TTO)	8	7	10	25
4	Guadeloupe (GLP)	4	2	6	12
5	Bahamas (BAH)	3	8	9	20
6	Martinique (MTQ)	3	7	4	14
7	Grenada (GRN)	2	0	1	3
8	Cayman Islands (CAY)	2	0	0	2
9	Bermuda (BER)	1	2	1	4
10	Antigua and Barbuda (ATG)	0	1	1	2
10	Aruba (ARU)	0	1	1	2
12	French Guiana (GUF)	0	1	0	1
13	Guyana (GUY)	0	0	1	1
Totals (13 entries)		58	58	58	174
