= Athletics at the 2003 Pan American Games – Men's long jump =

Men's long jump at the Pan American Games

The final of the Men's Long Jump event at the 2003 Pan American Games took place on Wednesday August 6, 2003. Title holder Iván Pedroso from Cuba won the title for the third time in a row.

== Medalists ==
Gold	Iván Pedroso; Cuba
Silver	Luis Méliz; Cuba
Bronze	Víctor Castillo; Venezuela

== Records ==
World Record	Mike Powell (USA)	8.95 m	August 30, 1991	Tokyo, Japan
Pan Am Record	Carl Lewis (USA)	8.75 m	August 16, 1987	Indianapolis, United States

== Results ==
Rank	Athlete	Attempts						Final
Rank	Athlete	1	2	3	4	5	6	Result
1	Iván Pedroso (CUB)	8.00	X	8.23	X	X	-	8.23 m
2	Luis Méliz (CUB)	8.01	8.20	6.10	7.75	-	7.83	8.20 m
3	Víctor Castillo (VEN)	7.66	7.50	X	7.85	7.98	X	7.98
4	Kareem Streete-Thompson (CAY)	7.78	X	7.86	X	7.88	7.96	7.96 m
5	Osbourne Moxey (BAH)	7.58	7.86	7.80	7.80	7.85	7.93	7.93 m
6	Kevin Dilworth (USA)	7.76	7.67	7.70	X	7.86	6.15	7.86 m
7	Aundre Edwards (JAM)	X	X	7.76	X	X	-	7.76 m
8	Kevin Bartlett (BAR)	7.60	6.76	X	X	7.39	X	7.60 m
9	Melvin Lister (USA)	X	X	7.56				7.56 m
10	Jean Cummings (VIN)	5.82	7.44	7.37				7.44 m
11	José Raúl Mercedes (DOM)	6.89	7.11	6.65				7.11 m
12	Keita Cline (IVB)	X	X	6.96				6.96 m
13	Vaughaligan Walwyn (ISV)	X	6.69	X				6.69 m
14	Orson Elrington (BIZ)	3.77	X	X				3.77 m
—	Cleavon Dillon (TRI)	X	X	X				NM

== See also ==
- 2003 World Championships in Athletics – Men's long jump
- Athletics at the 2004 Summer Olympics – Men's long jump
