= Benedetta Ceccarelli =

Italian hurdler (born 1980)

Personal information
- Born: 23 January 1980 (age 46) Perugia, Italy
- Height: 1.70 m (5 ft 7 in)
- Weight: 51 kg (112 lb)

Sport
- Country: Italy
- Sport: Athletics
- Event: 400 metres hurdles
- Club: CUS Roma

Achievements and titles
- Personal best: 400 m hs: 54.79 (2005)
Medal record
Summer Universiade
Silver medal – second place	2005 Izmir	400 m hurdles
Mediterranean Games
Gold medal – first place	2005 Almeria	400 m hurdles
European Athletics Junior Championships
Silver medal – second place	1999 Riga	400 m hurdles

Benedetta Ceccarelli (born 23 January 1980, in Perugia) is an Italian athlete who specializes in the 400 metres hurdles.

== Biography ==
She won two medals, at the individual level, at the International athletics competitions. Her personal best time is 54.79 seconds, achieved in August 2005 in Rieti.

== Achievements ==
Year	Competition	Venue	Position	Event	Notes
Representing Italy
1998	World Junior Championships	Annecy, France	26th (h)	400m hurdles	61.85
1998	World Junior Championships	Annecy, France	10th (h)	4 × 400 m relay	3:43.26
2001	European U23 Championships	Amsterdam, Netherlands	11th (h)	400m hurdles	59.51
2004	World Athletics Final	Monte Carlo, Monaco	8th	400 metres hurdles	57.23
2005	Universiade	İzmir, Turkey	2nd	400 metres hurdles	55.22
2005	Mediterranean Games	Almería, Spain	1st	400 metres hurdles	55.76
2006	European Cup	Prague, Czech Republic	5th	400 metres hurdles	58.25

== National titles ==
Benedetta Ceccarelli has won 6 times the individual national championship.

- 6 wins in the 100 metres hurdles (2004, 2005, 2006, 2007, 2008, 2009)

== See also ==
- Italian records in athletics
- Italian all-time lists - 400 metres hurdles
