= Kevin Bartlett (athlete) =

Barbadian long jumper (born 1981)

Personal information
- Born: 20 January 1981 (age 44)

Sport
- Sport: Track and field

Kevin Bartlett (born 20 January 1981) is a retired Barbadian long jumper and sprinter.

In the young age categories, he won several regional medals, including four medals at the 1997 CARIFTA Games, and he finished eleventh at the 2000 World Junior Championships. He later finished eighth at the 2003 Pan American Games. At the 2003 Central American and Caribbean Championships he had less success as he no-marked in the long jump final, and reached the 100 metres semifinal.

He became the Barbadian champion several times. His personal best jump was 7.85 metres indoor, achieved in January 2002 in Joplin. Outdoors he only had 7.67 metres, achieved in 2000. His personal best jump is the Barbadian indoor record.
