= 1998 World Junior Championships in Athletics – Women's 400 metres hurdles =

The women's 400 metres hurdles event at the 1998 World Junior Championships in Athletics was held in Annecy, France, at Parc des Sports on 28, 29 and 31 July.

== Medalists ==
Gold	Li Yulian; China
Silver	Allison Beckford; Jamaica
Bronze	Sun Hong Wei; China

== Results ==
=== Final ===
31 July

Rank	Name	Nationality	Time	Notes
1st place, gold medalist(s)	Li Yulian	China	55.93	
2nd place, silver medalist(s)	Allison Beckford	Jamaica	57.19	
3rd place, bronze medalist(s)	Sun Hong Wei	China	57.43	
4	Peta-Gaye Gayle	Jamaica	57.73	
5	Vanessa Becker	South Africa	58.19	
6	Olivia Abderrhamane	France	58.22	
7	Medina Tudor	Romania	58.56	
8	Astrid Joziasse	Netherlands	59.70	

=== Semifinals ===
29 July

==== Semifinal 1 ====
Rank	Name	Nationality	Time	Notes
1	Sun Hong Wei	China	57.77	Q
2	Peta-Gaye Gayle	Jamaica	57.79	Q
3	Vanessa Becker	South Africa	59.06	Q
4	Astrid Joziasse	Netherlands	59.25	q
5	Angeles Pantoja	Mexico	59.43	
6	Kylie Wheeler	Australia	59.80	
7	Rachael Kay	United Kingdom	60.12	
8	Hedda Jacob	Germany	60.45	

==== Semifinal 2 ====
Rank	Name	Nationality	Time	Notes
1	Li Yulian	China	57.07	Q
2	Allison Beckford	Jamaica	57.28	Q
3	Olivia Abderrhamane	France	58.47	Q
4	Medina Tudor	Romania	58.69	q
5	Tracey Duncan	United Kingdom	59.39	
6	Kristin Ringel	Germany	59.57	
7	Jamillah Wade	United States	59.66	
8	Sonia Brito	Australia	60.25	

=== Heats ===
28 July

==== Heat 1 ====
Rank	Name	Nationality	Time	Notes
1	Allison Beckford	Jamaica	58.53	Q
2	Kylie Wheeler	Australia	59.44	Q
3	Hedda Jacob	Germany	60.12	Q
4	Elodie Cruchant	France	60.90	
5	Marina Shiyan	Russia	61.13	
6	Velveth Moreno	Panama	61.68	
7	Barbara Bello	Italy	61.69	
8	Faní Halkiá	Greece	62.50	

==== Heat 2 ====
Rank	Name	Nationality	Time	Notes
1	Li Yulian	China	58.06	Q
2	Medina Tudor	Romania	59.05	Q
3	Sonia Brito	Australia	59.42	Q
4	Kristin Ringel	Germany	59.86	q
5	Lise Margareth Jensen	Norway	61.34	
6	Marina Kravtsova	Russia	61.50	
7	Anja Rantanen	Finland	61.78	

==== Heat 3 ====
Rank	Name	Nationality	Time	Notes
1	Peta-Gaye Gayle	Jamaica	58.46	Q
2	Sun Hong Wei	China	59.61	Q
3	Astrid Joziasse	Netherlands	59.69	Q
4	Angeles Pantoja	Mexico	60.07	q
5	Jamillah Wade	United States	60.36	q
6	Rachael Kay	United Kingdom	60.58	q
7	Isabel Silva	Brazil	61.53	

==== Heat 4 ====
Rank	Name	Nationality	Time	Notes
1	Vanessa Becker	South Africa	59.26	Q
2	Olivia Abderrhamane	France	59.67	Q
3	Tracey Duncan	United Kingdom	60.74	Q
4	Keiko Kikugawa	Japan	61.48	
5	Benedetta Ceccarelli	Italy	61.85	
6	Verónica Quijano	El Salvador	62.91	
7	Sheena Johnson	United States	63.92	
8	Avikali Kainoko	Fiji	65.83	

== Participation ==
According to an unofficial count, 30 athletes from 21 countries participated in the event.

- Australia (2)
- Brazil (1)
- China (2)
- El Salvador (1)
- Fiji (1)
- Finland (1)
- France (2)
- Germany (2)
- Greece (1)
- Italy (2)
- Jamaica (2)
- Japan (1)
- Mexico (1)
- Netherlands (1)
- Norway (1)
- Panama (1)
- Romania (1)
- Russia (2)
- South Africa (1)
- United Kingdom (2)
- United States (2)
