= Xavier James =

Bermudian sprinter

Personal information
- Born: 28 December 1975 (age 50)

Sport
- Sport: Track and field

Xavier James (born 28 December 1975) is a sprinter who represented Bermuda at the 2004 Summer Olympics. He is a primary school teacher.
