= Robison Pratt =

Mexican pole vaulter (born 1980)

Personal information
- Nickname: Robbie
- Nationality: Mexican
- Born: Robison Merrell Pratt Hinton; February 25, 1980 (age 46) Jiddah, Saudi Arabia
- Height: 6 ft 6 in (1.98 m)

Sport
- Country: Mexico
- Sport: Pole vaulting
- College team: BYU Cougars
- Coached by: Elbert Pratt, Yuri Volkov, Valeri Karapetov, Larry Berryhill (2003–2004), Jeremy Bailey (2004–2006)

Achievements and titles
- Olympic finals: 2000 Summer Olympics: Semifinalist
- Regional finals: 2003 Mountain West Conference: Champion
- National finals: 2005 NCAA National Championships: Champion; 2006 NCAA National Championships: Runner-up
- Highest world ranking: 16th (2006)
- Personal best: 18 feet 8.25 inches (5.70 m) (2006)
Medal record
Representing Mexico
Central American and Caribbean Games
Gold medal – first place	2006 Cartagena	Pole vault

Robison "Robbie" Pratt (born February 25, 1980) is an Olympic pole vaulter and an NCAA national champion.

== Early life ==
Pratt was born in Jiddah, Saudi Arabia to Elbert Pratt and Anne Hinton Pratt. He was named after the Brigham Young University coach, Clarence Robison, for whom his father competed in 1974 as a decathlete. Pratt moved to Dublan, near Chihuahua, Mexico when he was two years old, and gained Mexican citizenship. At age thirteen, he moved to El Paso, Texas, where he began participating in track and field. His father, Elbert, is a professional coach and saw to it that he and his four younger siblings all learned to pole vault. Pratt started serious training at age sixteen, and he won his first pole vaulting medal at age seventeen when he placed first at the Pan American Junior Championships in Havana, Cuba.

Early in his career and up until after the Olympics, Pratt was coached by his father, Elbert Pratt, and by Yuri Volkov and Valeri Karapetov. While at Brigham Young University, he was coached by Larry Berryhill from 2003 to 2004 and by Jeremy Bailey from the fall of 2004–2006. Bailey continued to coach Pratt throughout his professional career.

Soon after winning the Pan American Junior Championships at seventeen, Pratt sustained a cerebral hemorrhage, which was incurred unrelated to his vaulting. He was hospitalized for two weeks and was unable to vault for eight months. At age nineteen, Pratt returned to competition and broke the Mexican Junior National Record six times, finishing the season with a personal best of 17 feet 6.5 inches (5.35 m).

== 2000 Olympic Games ==
With a height of 6 ft 6 in (1.98 m), Pratt was among the tallest international pole vaulters. He qualified for the 2000 Summer Olympics with another personal best of 18 feet 4.5 inches (5.60 m). At the Olympics, Pratt represented Mexico, the country where he had lived the longest. Being only twenty years old, he was the youngest vaulter, and he finished the competition as a semi-finalist.

Immediately after the Olympics, Pratt withdrew from competitive sports for two years. As a member of the Church of Jesus Christ of Latter-day Saints (LDS Church), he volunteered for a mission preaching the gospel of Christ and serving the people in Torreón, Mexico.

== Brigham Young University and professional career ==
In 2003, Pratt began school at Brigham Young University. That year, he was the Mountain West Conference Champion and a finalist in the Pan American Games in the Dominican Republic. In 2004, he married Lisa Antonelli, a fellow BYU track athlete and All-American. In 2005, he became the NCAA National Champion and a finalist in the World University Games in İzmir, Turkey. In 2006, Pratt jumped a personal best of 18 feet 8.25 inches (5.70 m) and finished the indoor season with a world ranking of sixteenth, according to the International Association of Athletics Federations. He was the runner-up in both the indoor and outdoor NCAA National Championships, and he claimed his first senior title in a major international championship by winning the Central American and Caribbean Games, breaking the Games record in the process. Additionally, he was named to the 2006 IAAF World Cup Team to represent the Americas, where he finished in ninth place. In 2007, Pratt became a semi-finalist at the World Championships in Osaka, Japan and a finalist in the Pan American Games in Rio de Janeiro, Brazil.
