= Michelle Burgher =

Jamaican athlete (born 1977)

Personal information
- Born: 12 March 1977 (age 49) Kingston, Jamaica

Sport
- Sport: Track and field
Medal record
Representing Jamaica
Olympic Games
Silver medal – second place	2000 Sydney	4 × 400 m relay
Bronze medal – third place	2004 Athens	4 × 400 m relay
World Championships
Gold medal – first place	2001 Edmonton	4 × 400 m relay
CAC Championships
Gold medal – first place	2001 Guatemala City	400 m
Gold medal – first place	2003 St. George's	4 × 400 m relay
Silver medal – second place	2003 St. George's	400
Pan American Games
Silver medal – second place	2003 Sto Domingo	4 × 400 metres relay
CAC Junior Championships (U20)
Gold medal – first place	1996 San Salvador	4 × 400 m relay
CARIFTA Games Junior (U20)
Gold medal – first place	1996 Kingston	400 m hurdles
Silver medal – second place	1996 Kingston	400 m

Michelle Burgher-Duncan (born 12 March 1977) is a track and field athlete, competing internationally for Jamaica.

== Career ==
Burgher competed for the George Mason Patriots and Clemson Tigers track and field teams in the NCAA.

She was a bronze medalist in the 4 × 400 m relay at the 2004 Olympic Games in Athens, Greece.

She conducts coaching clinics and talks for school kids. Her ambition is to become a pediatric psychologist.

In 2008, Burgher joined the track and field coaching staff at the Indiana University of Pennsylvania in Indiana, PA. The move reunited Burgher with IUP's head coach, Ralph White. White coached Burgher at Clemson and she was an assistant coach under White at Williams from 2001 to 2004.^{1}

== Achievements ==
Year	Competition	Venue	Position	Event	Notes
Representing Jamaica
1996	CARIFTA Games (U-20)	Kingston, Jamaica	2nd	400 m	54.36
1996	CARIFTA Games (U-20)	Kingston, Jamaica	1st	400 m hurdles	59.98
1996	Central American and Caribbean Junior Championships (U-20)	San Salvador, El Salvador	5th	400 m	56.12
1996	Central American and Caribbean Junior Championships (U-20)	San Salvador, El Salvador	1st	4 × 400 m relay	3:41.99
1996	World Junior Championships	Sydney, Australia	7th (h)	4 × 400 m relay	3:40.58
2000	Olympic Games	Sydney, Australia	2nd	4 × 400 m relay	3:25.65 (h)
2001	Central American and Caribbean Championships	Ciudad de Guatemala, Guatemala	1st	400 m	53.04 A
2001	World Championships	Edmonton, Canada	1st	4 × 400 m relay	3:24.87 (h)
2003	Central American and Caribbean Championships	St. George's, Grenada	2nd	400 m	52.19
2003	Central American and Caribbean Championships	St. George's, Grenada	1st	4 × 400 m relay	52.19
2003	Pan American Games	Santo Domingo, Dominican Republic	8th	400 m	53.26
2003	Pan American Games	Santo Domingo, Dominican Republic	2nd	4 × 400 m relay	3:27.34
2004	Olympic Games	Athens, Greece	3rd	4 × 400 m relay	3:22.00 SB
