= Aleen Bailey =

Jamaican sprinter (born 1980)

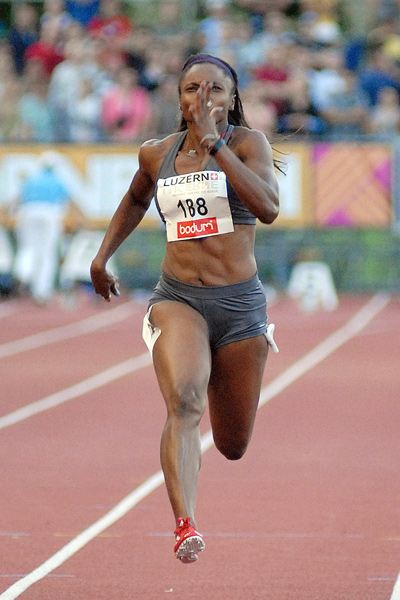
- Bailey in 2012

Personal information
- Born: 25 November 1980 (age 45) Islington, Jamaica

Sport
- Sport: Track and field
Medal record
Women's athletics
Representing Jamaica
Olympic Games
Gold medal – first place	2004 Athens	4 × 100 m relay
World Championships
Gold medal – first place	2009 Berlin	4 × 100 m relay
Silver medal – second place	2005 Helsinki	4 × 100 m relay
Bronze medal – third place	1999 Seville	4 × 100 m relay
Pan American Games
Gold medal – first place	1999 Winnipeg	4 × 100 m relay
Gold medal – first place	2007 Rio de Janeiro	4 × 100 m relay
World Athletics Final
Silver medal – second place	2004 Monte Carlo	100 m
Bronze medal – third place	2004 Monte Carlo	200 m
CAC Junior Championships (U20)
Gold medal – first place	1996 San Salvador	4 × 400 m relay
CAC Junior Championships (U17)
Gold medal – first place	1996 San Salvador	100 m
Gold medal – first place	1996 San Salvador	200 m
Gold medal – first place	1996 San Salvador	4 × 100 m relay
CARIFTA Games (Under 20s)
Gold medal – first place	1997 Bridgetown	200 m
Gold medal – first place	1997 Bridgetown	4 × 100 m relay
Gold medal – first place	1998 Port of Spain	100 m
Gold medal – first place	1998 Port of Spain	200 m
Gold medal – first place	1998 Port of Spain	4 × 100 m relay
Gold medal – first place	1999 Fort-de-France	100 m
Gold medal – first place	1999 Fort-de-France	200 m
Silver medal – second place	1997 Bridgetown	100 m
CARIFTA Games (Under 17s)
Gold medal – first place	1996 Kingston	100 m
Gold medal – first place	1996 Kingston	200 m
Gold medal – first place	1996 Kingston	4 × 100 m relay
Bronze medal – third place	1995 George Town	100 m

Aleen May Bailey (born 25 November 1980) is a retired Jamaican track and field sprinter who competed in the 100 metres and 200 m.

== Career ==
She competed in the 2004 Summer Olympics and won the gold medal as a member of the 4 × 100 m relay team. Bailey trains in Columbia, South Carolina under Curtis Frye and is the sister of the reggae star Capleton.

Bailey graduated from the University of South Carolina, where she competed during her Junior and Senior season after transferring from Barton County Community College.

In the 2003 NCAA Outdoor Track and Field Championships, Bailey won the 100 and 200 meters, both times defeating heavily favored Muna Lee of LSU. She was also a member of the 4 × 100 m championship team at the 2002 outdoor championships.

Bailey competed for her native Jamaica at the 2004 Summer Olympics where she placed 5th in the 100 meters and 4th at the 200 meters. She teamed with 200 m champion Veronica Campbell, Tayna Lawrence, and Sherone Simpson to win the 4 × 100 m relay.

At the 2005 World Championships in Athletics she won (together with Daniele Browning, Sherone Simpson and Veronica Campbell-Brown) a silver medal. At the 2007 Pan American Games she finished fifth in the 200 m and won a gold medal in relay.

Bailey represented Jamaica at the 2008 Summer Olympics in Beijing. She competed at the 4 × 100 m relay together with Shelly-Ann Fraser-Pryce, Sheri-Ann Brooks and Veronica Campbell-Brown. In its first round heat, Jamaica placed first in front of Russia, Germany and China. The Jamaica relay's time of 42.24 seconds was the first time overall out of sixteen participating nations. With this result, Jamaica qualified for the final, replacing Brooks and Bailey with Sherone Simpson and Kerron Stewart. Jamaica did not finish the race due to a mistake in the baton exchange.

== Personal bests ==
Her personal bests are:
100 m: 11.04
200 m: 22.33

== Achievements ==
Year	Competition	Venue	Position	Event	Notes
Representing Jamaica
1995	CARIFTA Games (U-17)	George Town, Cayman Islands	3rd	100 m	12.10 (0.2 m/s)
1995	CARIFTA Games (U-17)	George Town, Cayman Islands	4th	200 m	24.46 (0.2 m/s)
1996	CARIFTA Games (U-17)	Kingston, Jamaica	1st	100 m	11.85
1996	CARIFTA Games (U-17)	Kingston, Jamaica	1st	200 m	24.88 (-5.1 m/s)
1996	CARIFTA Games (U-20)	Kingston, Jamaica	1st	4 × 100 m relay	44.24
1996	Central American and Caribbean Junior Championships (U-17)	San Salvador, El Salvador	1st	100 m	11.75 (0.7 m/s)
1996	Central American and Caribbean Junior Championships (U-17)	San Salvador, El Salvador	1st	200 m	24.50
1996	Central American and Caribbean Junior Championships (U-17)	San Salvador, El Salvador	1st	4 × 100 m relay	46.31
1996	Central American and Caribbean Junior Championships (U-20)	San Salvador, El Salvador	1st	4 × 400 m relay	3:41.99
1996	World Junior Championships	Sydney, Australia	10th (sf)	200 m	24.33
1996	World Junior Championships	Sydney, Australia	2nd	4 × 100 m relay	44.26
1997	CARIFTA Games (U-20)	Bridgetown, Barbados	2nd	100 m	11.60 (0.0 m/s)
1997	CARIFTA Games (U-20)	Bridgetown, Barbados	1st	200 m	23.65 (0.9 m/s)
1997	CARIFTA Games (U-20)	Bridgetown, Barbados	1st	4 × 100 m relay	45.27
1998	CARIFTA Games (U-20)	Port of Spain, Trinidad and Tobago	1st	100 m	11.37
1998	CARIFTA Games (U-20)	Port of Spain, Trinidad and Tobago	1st	200 m	23.16 (2.4 m/s) w
1998	CARIFTA Games (U-20)	Port of Spain, Trinidad and Tobago	1st	4 × 100 m relay	44.97
1998	World Junior Championships	Annecy, France	3rd	4 × 100 m relay	44.61
1999	CARIFTA Games (U-20)	Fort-de-France, Martinique	1st	100 m	11.60 (-0.8 m/s)
1999	CARIFTA Games (U-20)	Fort-de-France, Martinique	1st	200 m	23.39 (1.6 m/s)
1999	Pan American Games	Winnipeg, Canada	1st	4 × 100 m relay	42.62
1999	World Championships	Seville, Spain	3rd	4 × 100 m relay	42.15 SB
2000	NACAC U-25 Championships	Monterrey, Mexico	2nd	100 m	11.66 (wind: -1.6 m/s)
2000	NACAC U-25 Championships	Monterrey, Mexico	1st	200 m	23.47 (wind: -3.1 m/s)
2001	World Championships	Edmonton, Canada	7th (h)	200 m	23.70 (0.2 m/s)
2003	World Championships	Paris, France	6th	100 m	11.07 (0.9 m/s)
2003	World Championships	Paris, France	2nd (h)	200 m	22.98 (-0.4 m/s)
2004	Olympic Games	Athens, Greece	5th	100 m	11.05 (-0.1 m/s)
2004	Olympic Games	Athens, Greece	4th	200 m	22.42 (0.8 m/s)
2004	Olympic Games	Athens, Greece	1st	4 × 100 m relay	41.73 NR
2005	World Championships	Helsinki, Finland	5th (sf)	100 m	11.23 (0.4 m/s)
2005	World Championships	Helsinki, Finland	2nd	4 × 100 m relay	41.99 SB
2007	Pan American Games	Rio de Janeiro, Brazil	5th	200 m	23.09 (-0.6 m/s)
2007	Pan American Games	Rio de Janeiro, Brazil	1st	4 × 100 m relay	43.58
2007	World Championships	Osaka, Japan	6th	200 m	22.72 (1.7 m/s)
2008	Central American and Caribbean Championships	Cali, Colombia	4th	100 m	11.43 (1.2 m/s)
2008	Central American and Caribbean Championships	Cali, Colombia	6th	200 m	23.34 (0.3 m/s)
2008	Olympic Games	Beijing, China	1st (h)	4 × 100 m relay	42.24 SB
2009	World Championships	Berlin, Germany	8th	100 m	11.16 (0.1 m/s)
2009	World Championships	Berlin, Germany	1st	4 × 100 m relay	42.06
2013	Central American and Caribbean Championships	Morelia, Mexico	3rd	100 m	11.34 (+0.1 m/s)
2013	Central American and Caribbean Championships	Morelia, Mexico	2nd	200 m	23.08 (-0.6 m/s)
2013	Central American and Caribbean Championships	Morelia, Mexico	1st	4 × 100 m relay	43.58
