= Elbert Pratt =

American track and field coach

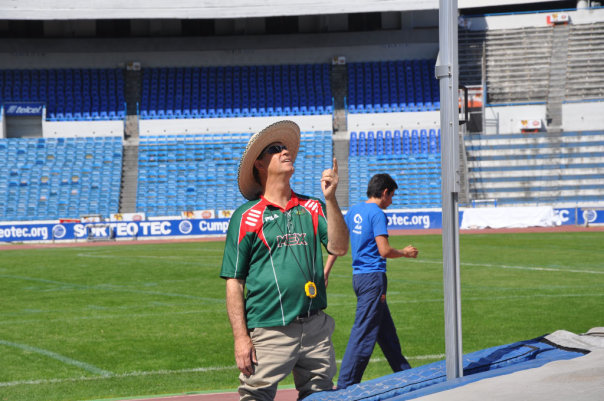
Elbert Pratt

Elbert Pratt is a track and field coach. He currently resides in Monterrey, Mexico and serves as the Olympic Development Coach at the Tec de Monterrey and the President of the Pan American Pole Vault Association. Elbert Pratt also owns UniversalSport, a supplier of brand-name fitness equipment.

== Accomplishments ==
President of Pan American Pole Vault Association, 2009–present

USA Track & Field, University Pole Vault Coach of the Year, 2001

National Track & Field Coach - Mexico, 1992–2007

- Coached National Teams in more than 60 international meets
- Coached Mexican athletes to 26 National Records

National President of Collegiate Track and Field - Mexico, 1996–2002

All-American Decathlete at Brigham Young University

== Coaching experience ==
Olympic Development Coach, Tec de Monterrey - Mexico 2006–present

- Four consecutive National Team Championships – Women (2007–2009)
- Four consecutive National Team Championships – Men (2007–2010)

Head Coach, University of Juarez - Mexico, 1993–2002

- Eight consecutive National Team Championships-Women (1995–2002)
- Eight consecutive National Team Championships-Men (1995–2002)
- Ten athletes in Olympic Games and World Championships

National Olympic Coach - Saudi Arabia, 1979–1982

- Helped Saudi athletes break 17 national records in a three-year period
- Coached first medalists for Saudi Arabia in international competitions
- Assistant Track and Field Coach, Brigham Young University - Utah, 1976–1979
- Head Track Coach, University of Wyoming - Wyoming, 1976

Pratt organized, ran, and participated in many successful pole vault camps. He will be a featured coach 7–9 July 2011 in at UVU with his son Gary organized by Vaulted life
