= Andy Grant =

Retired Vincentian Olympic runner

Personal information
- Full name: Andy Grant
- Nationality: Saint Vincent and the Grenadines
- Born: 7 May 1984 (age 42)
- Height: 1.70 m (5 ft 7 in)
- Weight: 57 kg (126 lb)

Sport
- Sport: Athletics
- Event: Middle distance running

Achievements and titles
- Personal best: 800 m: 1:54.53 (2004)

Andy Grant (born May 7, 1984) is a retired middle distance runner from Saint Vincent and the Grenadines. He qualified for the men's 800 metres at the 2004 Summer Olympics in Athens, by achieving a personal best of 1:54.53 from the NACAC Championships in Sherbrooke, Canada. Grant threw down a time of 1:57.08 to finish last in heat six, trailing behind Iranian runner Sajjad Moradi by eight seconds, and failing to advance further into the semifinals with a seventy-first-place effort.
