= Carol Clarke =

American news anchor

- Born: United States
- Occupation(s): News anchor, journalist

Carol Clarke is an American news anchor.

Clarke works for WYFF News 4, broadcasting out of Greenville, South Carolina, and serving the upstate of South Carolina, western North Carolina and northeastern Georgia. It's the nation's 36th television market. Clarke has anchored and reported for WYFF-TV since 1985. She has won numerous national and regional awards. In 2009, she was awarded the George Foster Peabody Award for her role as producer and reporter of the documentary "Paul's Gift," which explored the issue of organ donation through the story of one family's loss. Clarke won seven southeastern regional Emmy awards, and was also inducted into the Emmys Silver Circle. She has won three National Headliner Awards and the Champion-Tuck Economics Prize for Business Reporting for a series she did on the textile industry in Hong Kong and Taiwan in 1985. In 2007, the South Carolina Broadcaster's Association awarded Clarke one of its highest honors, the Masters Award, it "acknowledges lifetime achievements of on-air broadcasters who have made significant contributions to broadcasting in South Carolina and who personify high broadcast industry standards within their communities."

Clarke co-anchors the six and 11 o'clock newscasts for WYFF-TV, weekdays. She is also a health and medical reporter. She is a native of Michigan's Upper Peninsula, and a 1979 graduate of Northern Michigan University with a degree in mass communications. She also has a master's degree in health and nutrition education.

Clarke has been married to composer and choirmaster Arlen Clarke since 2018. She has two adult children from her previous marriage.
