= Christine Simmons =

American businesswoman

Christine N. Simmons
- Born: Pomona, California, U.S.
- Education: University of California, Los Angeles
- Occupation: Chief Operating Officer
- Employer: Academy of Motion Picture Arts and Sciences

Christine Nicole Simmons is an American businesswoman and the first African American and woman to serve as Chief Operating Officer for the Academy of Motion Picture Arts and Sciences. She leads the Academy's first Office of Representation, Inclusion, and Equity.

== Early life ==
Simmons was born Christine Nicole Maye in Pomona, California, and grew up in Rancho Cucamonga, California, as the youngest of four girls. She gained a younger stepsister in her teenage years. She was an athlete in high school on the volleyball, basketball, and track team. Simmons attended the University of California, Los Angeles and received her Bachelor of Science in Physiological Sciences. She was a campus activist, student leader, and a member of several organizations, including mentoring programs and programs to improve the community.

== Career ==
Simmons began her career as a director for the UCLA Academic Supports Program, in which she directly recruited, hired, trained, and supervised staff, interns and volunteers. She later became Assistant Manager of Finance & Accounting for the Australian Trade Commission. In 2001, she joined Corporate World HQ as a Supplier Diversity Analyst, where she managed projects for Global and Latin America Supplier Diversity Managers to ensure more supply contracts were granted to women and minority-owned businesses.

From 2003 to 2009, Simmons developed customized supplier diversity programs to facilitate strategic relationships between Fortune 500 companies and adverse suppliers for the So. Cal. Minority Business Development Council and later went on to a role at The Walt Disney Company where she identified qualified, competitive, and diverse suppliers for sourcing opportunities supporting Film, Media Networks, Marketing, and Technology.

In early 2009, Simmons joined Magic Johnson Enterprises as Vice President of Strategic Alliances. Simmons left Magic Johnson Enterprises for a short stint in 2012 to lead supplier diversity at NBCUniversal. However, she returned to Magic Johnson Enterprises in 2014 as Executive Vice President. In October 2014, she became the LA Sparks President and Chief Operating Officer, creating a holistic vision and strategic approach to maximize limited resources and obtain new fans in nontraditional categories. She also led the design of the Sparks championship ring. Her time with the LA Sparks earned her several awards and honors, including the Women in Sports and Events (WISE) Woman of Inspiration Award in 2017.

In January 2019, the Academy of Motion Picture Arts and Sciences named Simmons to the position of Chief Operating Officer. She leads the first Office of Representation, Inclusion, and Equity and the COVID-19 response task force. She oversees the Academy Foundation, consisting of the Margaret Herrick Library, Academy Film Archive, its educational programs, Talent Development and Diversity programs, and the Science and Technology Council.

=== Boards and committees ===
Simmons is Regent Emeritus for the UC Board of Regents. She is the immediate past president of the Board of the UCLA Alumni and a re-elected member of the UCLA Foundation Board of Directors. She also served as treasurer of the Alumni Associations of the UC.

Simmons is also on the Advisory Council for Next Play Capital, Shared Harvest Fund, MyCOVID MD, Committee for the LA 2020 Women on Boards, as well as a delegate for the Hollywood Commission.

=== Philanthropy ===
Simmons volunteers for Better Futures for Thomazeau, a small, grassroots nonprofit that provides aid in Haiti. The organization aims to promote the well-being, health, and education of needy children, thereby improving their quality of life and community at large.

Simmons also volunteers for Cari Champion's foundation, Brown Girls Dream, a mentor program for high potential young women of color. The program pairs young women leaders with multi-media industry veterans committed to helping them navigate through the early stages of their careers.

=== Recognition ===
Simmons was named a 2020 CSQ Visionary and honored by the YMCA with its 2019 Brotherhood Award and WISE LA with their 2017 Woman of Inspiration Award. Simmons was also listed on the 2018 Ebony Magazine Power 100 list, included on the University of California President's list of 2017 Remarkable Women of UC and the LA Business Journal’s 2016, 2017 & 2018 list of 500 most influential people in Los Angeles.
