= Peta-Gaye Gayle =

Jamaican athlete (born 1979)

Medal record

Athletics

Representing Jamaica

CAC Junior Championships (U20)
Gold medal – first place	1998 George Town	400 m hurdles
Gold medal – first place	1998 George Town	4x400 m relay

CARIFTA Games Junior (U20)
Gold medal – first place	1993 Fort-de-France	4 x 100 m relay
Gold medal – first place	1995 George Town	100 m hurdles
Gold medal – first place	1997 Bridgetown	400 m hurdles
Silver medal – second place	1995 George Town	200 m
Silver medal – second place	1996 Kingston	100 m
Silver medal – second place	1996 Kingston	200 m
Silver medal – second place	1996 Kingston	400 m hurdles
Bronze medal – third place	1994 Bridgetown	100 m hurdles
Bronze medal – third place	1995 George Town	4 x 100 m relay

CARIFTA Games Youth (U17)
Silver medal – second place	1993 Fort-de-France	200 m

Peta-Gaye Gayle (born 19 January 1979) is a retired female track and field sprinter from Jamaica, who competed in the 400 m hurdles during her career. Her personal best time in the women's 400 m hurdles is 55.92, set on 22 July 2001 in Guatemala City.

Gayle was an All-American hurdler for the Alabama Crimson Tide track and field team, finishing 3rd in the 400 m hurdles at the 2000 NCAA Division I Outdoor Track and Field Championships.

== Achievements ==
Year	Competition	Venue	Position	Event	Notes
Representing Jamaica
1996	World Junior Championships	Sydney, Australia	7th (h)	4 × 400 m relay	3:40.58
1998	World Junior Championships	Annecy, France	4th	400m hurdles	57.73
1998	World Junior Championships	Annecy, France	1st	4 × 400 m relay	3:32.29
2001	Central American and Caribbean Championships	Guatemala City, Guatemala	2nd	400 m hurdles	55.92 s
