= Sylvanie Morandais =

French hurdler (born 1979)

Personal information
- Nationality: French
- Born: 14 July 1979 (age 46) Pointe-Noire
- Years active: 2000s
- Height: 1.62 m (5 ft 4 in)
- Weight: 50 kg (110 lb)

Sport
- Event: 400 m hurdles
Medal record
Women's Athletics
Representing Guadeloupe
CARIFTA Games Junior (U20)
Silver medal – second place	1997 Bridgetown	400m hurdles
Bronze medal – third place	1996 Kingston	400m hurdles

Sylvanie Morandais (born 14 July 1979) is a retired French-Guadeloupen athlete who specialized in the 400 metres hurdles.

== Career ==
Morandais was born in Pointe-Noire, Guadeloupe. Morandais held the 300 metre hurdles youth record for Guadeloupe between 1996 and 2014. She won the gold medal at the 2005 Jeux de la Francophonie, and the 2005 Mediterranean Games. She also competed without reaching the final at the 2001 World Championships and the 2002 European Championships. In the 4 x 400 metres relay she finished fifth at the 2002 European Championships.

In 2006, she finished third in during the French Athletics Championships in Nancy, where she collapsed in tears after it due to feeling unable to accelerate at the end. In 2007, Morandais had to retire from competing due to an injury. By 2010, she was partaking in athletics competitions in various lengths of running, including 100 metres, 200 metres and 400 metres and also entered javelin competitions in addition to her traditional 400 metres hurdling discipline. In 2011, she announced she was in training to make a comeback to professional athletics. She started marathon running training whilst looking for athletics funding.

Her personal best times are 55.30 seconds in the 400 metres, achieved in May 2006 in Baie-Mahault; and 55.49 seconds in the 400 metres hurdles, achieved in July 2001 in Monaco.

== Personal life ==
Outside of athletics, she worked as a Contract Professional in the General Council of Essonne. She moved to Metropolitan France in 2001 to study for a business diploma in Essonne.
