= Allison Beckford =

Jamaican sprinter (born 1979)

Personal information
- Born: 8 May 1979 (age 47) Westmoreland Parish, Jamaica

Sport
- Sport: Track and field
Medal record
Athletics
Representing Jamaica
World Championships
Bronze medal – third place	2003 Paris	4x400 m relay
Pan American Games
Silver medal – second place	2003 Santo Domingo	4x400 metres relay
CAC Championships
Gold medal – first place	1999 Bridgetown	4×400 m
World Junior Championships
Gold medal – first place	1998 Annecy	4×400 m relay
Silver medal – second place	1998 Annecy	400 m hurdles
CAC Junior Championships (U20)
Gold medal – first place	1998 George Town	4x400 m relay
Bronze medal – third place	1998 George Town	400 m hurdles
CARIFTA Games Junior (U20)
Gold medal – first place	1998 Port of Spain	400m hurdles
Bronze medal – third place	1998 Port of Spain	400m

Allison J. Beckford (born 8 May 1979) is a Jamaican sprinter competing in the 400 metres. She attended the Manning's School in Savanna-la-Mar, Westmoreland, Jamaica, where she was one of the star athletes coached by Howard Daugharty. She was also academically astute passing several CXC (Caribbean Examination Council) exams and also A-levels exams after completing her upper six forms education. Her personal best of 50.83 was set in 2002. She has also competed in 400 m hurdles.

Beckford was a part of the Jamaican team that won the bronze medal in the 4 x 400 metres relay at the 2003 World Championships in Athletics. She was not selected for the bronze-winning relay team at the 2004 Summer Olympics. She did compete in the 400 metre race, but suffered a severe hamstring injury.

Beckford is a relative of long jumper James Beckford. She attended Rice University in Houston, Texas.

== Achievements ==
Year	Competition	Venue	Position	Event	Notes
Representing Jamaica
1998	World Junior Championships	Annecy, France	2nd	400m hurdles	57.19
1998	World Junior Championships	Annecy, France	1st	4 × 400 m relay	3:32.29
1999	Central American and Caribbean Championships	Bridgetown, Barbados	1st	4 × 400 m relay	3:30.00
1999	Pan American Games	Winnipeg, Canada	4th	4 × 400 m relay	3:30.76
2002	NACAC U-25 Championships	San Antonio, Texas, United States	1st	400 m	51.21
2002	NACAC U-25 Championships	San Antonio, Texas, United States	1st	4 × 400 m relay	3:34.06
2003	Pan American Games	Santo Domingo, Dominican Republic	6th	400 m hurdles	55.50
2003	Pan American Games	Santo Domingo, Dominican Republic	2nd	4 × 400 m relay	3:27.34
2003	World Championships	Paris, France	3rd	4 × 400 m relay	3:22.92
2004	Olympic Games	Athens, Greece	31st (h)	400 m	52.85
