= Naleya Downer =

Jamaican athlete (born 1980)

Personal information
- Born: 27 January 1980 (age 46)

Sport
- Sport: Track and field
- Club: Texas Longhorns
Medal record
Representing United States
Pan American Games
Silver medal – second place	2003 Santo Domingo	4x400m relay
World Junior Championships
Gold medal – first place	1998 Annecy	4x400m relay

Naleya Downer (born 27 January 1980), also known as Keasha Downer, is a retired female track and field sprinter from Jamaica, who competed in the 400 metres and the 400 metres hurdles during her career. Her personal best time in the women's 400 metres is 52.61, set on 4 May 2002 in Austin, Texas. She won a silver medal in the women's 4x400 metres relay at the 2003 Pan American Games, alongside Michelle Burgher, Novlene Williams, and Allison Beckford.

She ran track for the University of Texas at Austin.

== Achievements ==
Year	Competition	Venue	Position	Event	Notes
Representing Jamaica
2003	Pan American Games	Santo Domingo, Dominican Republic	2nd	4 × 400 m relay	3:27.34
