= 1999 South American Cross Country Championships =

- Organisers: CONSUDATLE
- Edition: 14th
- Date: February 27–28
- Host city: Artur Nogueira, São Paulo, Brazil
- Events: 8
- Distances: 12 km – Senior men 4 km – Men's short 8 km – Junior men (U20); 4 km – Youth men (U18); 8 km – Senior women 4 km – Women's short 6 km – Junior women (U20); 3 km – Youth women (U18)
- Participation: 89 athletes from 8 nations

The 1999 South American Cross Country Championships took place on February 27–28, 1999. The races were held in Artur Nogueira, Brazil.

Complete results, results for junior and youth competitions, and medal winners were published.

== Medallists ==
Event	Gold		Silver		Bronze	
Individual
Senior men (12 km)	Sérgio Correa Couto; Brazil	38:53	Franklin Tenorio; Ecuador	39:15	William Vásquez; Colombia	39:22
Men's short (4 km)	Valdenor Pereira dos Santos; Brazil	12:21	Juan José Cruz; Argentina	12:22	Freddy González; Venezuela	12:22
Junior (U20) men (8 km)	Jonathan Moraes Matos; Brazil	26:55	Thiago Pereira Cecatto; Brazil	26:58	Ricardo Ariel Franzón; Argentina	27:03
Youth (U18) men (4 km)	Marcel Siefert; Chile	13:30	Jeferson de Souza Sá; Brazil	13:46	Edson Moreira Barros; Brazil	13:46
Senior women (8 km)	Érika Olivera; Chile	29:48	Maria Cristina Bernardo Vaqueiro Rodrigues; Brazil	29:51	Rosângela Raimunda Pereira Faria; Brazil	29:58
Women's short (4 km)	Érika Olivera; Chile	14:05	Niusha Mancilla; Bolivia	14:11	María Paredes; Ecuador	14:15
Junior (U20) women (6 km)	Lucélia de Oliveira Peres; Brazil	22:39	Valquíria Silva Santos; Brazil	23:17	Keli Aparecida de Godoy; Brazil	23:38
Youth (U18) women (3 km)	Michelli de Carvalho Inácio; Brazil	11:32	Débora Regina Gomes Ferraz; Brazil	11:51	Raphaela Ribeiro de Lima; Brazil	11:52
Team
Senior men	Brazil	13	Colombia	15		
Men's short	Brazil	10	Argentina	21	Venezuela	34
Junior (U20) men	Brazil	7	Colombia	22		
Youth (U18) men	Brazil	9	Paraguay	24		
Senior women	Brazil	9	Chile	16		
Women's short	Chile	15	Brazil	17	Ecuador	30
Junior (U20) women	Brazil	6	Colombia	20		
Youth (U18) women	Brazil	6				

== Race results ==
=== Senior men's race (12 km) ===
Individual race
Rank	Athlete	Country	Time
1st place, gold medalist(s)	Sérgio Correa Couto	Brazil	38:53
2nd place, silver medalist(s)	Franklin Tenorio	Ecuador	39:15
3rd place, bronze medalist(s)	William Vásquez	Colombia	39:22
4	Marilson Gomes dos Santos	Brazil	39:24
5	Jacinto Navarrete	Colombia	39:25
6	Alejandro Semprún	Venezuela	39:37
7	Luis Ochoa	Colombia	39:39
8	Wellington Correia Fraga	Brazil	40:00
9	José Telles de Souza	Brazil	40:20
10	Edson Pereira de Souza	Brazil	40:41
11	Ricardo dos Reis Maestrello	Brazil	41:06
12	Juan Perea	Colombia	42:30
13	Ramón Aranda	Paraguay	44:22
—	Richard Arias	Ecuador	DNF

Teams
Rank
Team
Points

Brazil

Sérgio Correa Couto	1
Marilson Gomes dos Santos	4
Wellington Correia Fraga	8
(José Telles de Souza)	(9)
(Edson Pereira de Souza)	(10)
(Ricardo dos Reis Maestrello)	(11)

13

Colombia

William Vásquez	3
Jacinto Navarrete	5
Luis Ochoa	7
(Juan Perea)	(12)

15

- Note: Athletes in parentheses did not score for the team result.

=== Men's short race (4 km) ===
Individual race
Rank	Athlete	Country	Time
1st place, gold medalist(s)	Valdenor Pereira dos Santos	Brazil	12:21
2nd place, silver medalist(s)	Juan José Cruz	Argentina	12:22
3rd place, bronze medalist(s)	Freddy González	Venezuela	12:22
4	Israel dos Anjos	Brazil	12:28
5	Márcio Ribeiro da Silva	Brazil	12:30
6	João Carlos Leite	Brazil	12:33
7	Richard Arias	Ecuador	12:34
8	Javier Carriqueo	Argentina	12:35
9	José Carlos Dias de Oliveira	Brazil	12:35
10	Wellington Correa Fraga	Brazil	12:43
11	Ricardo Ariel Franzón	Argentina	12:56
12	Leonardo Malgor	Argentina	13:01
13	José Gregorio López	Venezuela	13:01
14	José Alberto Mansilla	Argentina	13:23
15	Antonio Ibañez	Argentina	13:27
16	Ramón Aranda	Paraguay	13:31
17	Carlos Barrientos	Paraguay	13:47
18	Néstor Nieves	Venezuela	13:50
19	Lucas Panadero	Paraguay	14:04
20	Mark Olivo	Venezuela	14:34
21	Emigdio Delgado	Venezuela	15:33

Teams
Rank	Team	Points
1st place, gold medalist(s)	Brazil: Valdenor Pereira dos Santos / 1; Israel dos Anjos / 4; Márcio Ribeiro da Silva / 5; (João Carlos Leite) / (6); (José Carlos Dias de Oliveira) / (9); (Wellington Correa Fraga) / (10)	10
2nd place, silver medalist(s)	Argentina: Juan José Cruz / 2; Javier Carriqueo / 8; Ricardo Ariel Franzón / 11; (Leonardo Malgor) / (12); (José Alberto Mansilla) / (14); (Antonio Ibañez) / (15)	21
3rd place, bronze medalist(s)	Venezuela: Freddy González / 3; José Gregorio López / 13; Néstor Nieves / 18; (Mark Olivo) / (20); (Emigdio Delgado) / (21)	34
4	Paraguay: Ramón Aranda / 16; Carlos Barrientos / 17; Lucas Panadero / 19	52

- Note: Athletes in parentheses did not score for the team result.

=== Junior (U20) men's race (8 km) ===
Individual race
Rank	Athlete	Country	Time
1st place, gold medalist(s)	Jonathan Moraes Matos	Brazil	26:55
2nd place, silver medalist(s)	Thiago Pereira Cecatto	Brazil	26:58
3rd place, bronze medalist(s)	Ricardo Ariel Franzón	Argentina	27:03
4	Guilherme Pizzirani	Brazil	27:11
5	Jonathan Monje	Chile	27:20
6	Víctor Ocampo	Colombia	27:27
7	Jaime Baquero	Colombia	27:35
8	André Pereira da Silva	Brazil	27:52
9	Arbey Rivera	Colombia	28:03
10	Jorge Cabrera	Paraguay	29:59
11	Williams Panadero	Paraguay	30:47
—	Dalton Luiz Barbosa	Brazil	DNF
—	Valcy Pedo de Lima	Brazil	DNF

Teams
Rank
Team
Points

Brazil

Jonathan Moraes Matos	1
Thiago Pereira Cecatto	2
Guilherme Pizzirani	4
(André Pereira da Silva)	(8)
(Dalton Luiz Barbosa)	(DNF)
(Valcy Pedo de Lima)	(DNF)

7

Colombia

Víctor Ocampo	6
Jaime Baquero	7
Arbey Rivera	9

22

- Note: Athletes in parentheses did not score for the team result.

=== Youth (U18) men's race (4 km) ===
Individual race
Rank	Athlete	Country	Time
1st place, gold medalist(s)	Marcel Siefert	Chile	13:30
2nd place, silver medalist(s)	Jeferson de Souza Sá	Brazil	13:46
3rd place, bronze medalist(s)	Edson Moreira Barros	Brazil	13:46
4	Vinícius José Campos Lopes	Brazil	13:46
5	Felipe Gonçalves Monteiro	Brazil	13:50
6	Erick Molina	Bolivia	14:41
7	Rubén Paniagua	Paraguay	14:57
8	Gustavo López	Paraguay	15:21
9	Alcides Fernández	Paraguay	15:37
—	Diego Augeor	Paraguay	DNF

Teams
Rank
Team
Points

Brazil

Jeferson de Souza Sá	2
Edson Moreira Barros	3
Vinícius José Campos Lopes	4
(Felipe Gonçalves Monteiro)	(5)

9

Paraguay

Rubén Paniagua	7
Gustavo López	8
Alcides Fernández	9
(Diego Augeor)	(DNF)

24

- Note: Athletes in parentheses did not score for the team result.

=== Senior women's race (8 km) ===
Individual race
Rank	Athlete	Country	Time
1st place, gold medalist(s)	Érika Olivera	Chile	29:48
2nd place, silver medalist(s)	Maria Cristina Bernardo Vaqueiro Rodrigues	Brazil	29:51
3rd place, bronze medalist(s)	Rosângela Raimunda Pereira Faria	Brazil	29:58
4	Dione D'Agostini Chillemi	Brazil	30:19
5	Rita de Cássia Santos de Jesus	Brazil	30:27
6	Marlene Flores	Chile	30:34
7	Selma Cândida dos Reis	Brazil	30:39
8	Miriam Pulido	Colombia	30:54
9	Clara Morales	Chile	31:20
10	Verónica Páez	Argentina	31:50
11	Flor Venegas	Chile	32:54
—	Miriam Caldasso	Brazil	DNF

Teams
Rank
Team
Points

Brazil

Maria Cristina Bernardo Vaqueiro Rodrigues	2
Rosângela Raimunda Pereira Faria	3
Dione D'Agostini Chillemi	4
(Rita de Cássia Santos de Jesus)	(5)
(Selma Cândida dos Reis)	(7)
(Miriam Caldasso)	(DNF)

9

Chile

Érika Olivera	1
Marlene Flores	6
Clara Morales	9
(Flor Venegas)	(11)

16

- Note: Athletes in parentheses did not score for the team result.

=== Women's short race (4 km) ===
Individual race
Rank	Athlete	Country	Time
1st place, gold medalist(s)	Érika Olivera	Chile	14:05
2nd place, silver medalist(s)	Niusha Mancilla	Bolivia	14:11
3rd place, bronze medalist(s)	María Paredes	Ecuador	14:15
4	Ana Claudia de Souza	Brazil	14:19
5	Marlene Flores	Chile	14:21
6	Rosângela Raimunda Pereira Faria	Brazil	14:23
7	Maria Cristina Bernardo Vaqueiro Rodrigues	Brazil	14:27
8	Dione D'Agostini Chillemi	Brazil	14:30
9	Clara Morales	Chile	14:45
10	Miriam Pulido	Colombia	14:46
11	Verónica Páez	Argentina	14:48
12	Marina Claudia do Nascimento	Brazil	14:48
13	Mónica Amboya	Ecuador	15:04
14	Gabriela Cevallos	Ecuador	15:12

Teams
Rank	Team	Points
1st place, gold medalist(s)	Chile: Érika Olivera / 1; Marlene Flores / 5; Clara Morales / 9	15
2nd place, silver medalist(s)	Brazil: Ana Claudia de Souza / 4; Rosângela Raimunda Pereira Faria / 6; Maria Cristina Bernardo Vaqueiro Rodrigues / 7; (Dione D'Agostini Chillemi) / (8); (Marina Claudia do Nascimento) / (12)	17
3rd place, bronze medalist(s)	Ecuador: María Paredes / 3; Mónica Amboya / 13; Gabriela Cevallos / 14	30

- Note: Athletes in parentheses did not score for the team result.

=== Junior (U20) women's race (6 km) ===
Individual race
Rank	Athlete	Country	Time
1st place, gold medalist(s)	Lucélia de Oliveira Peres	Brazil	22:39
2nd place, silver medalist(s)	Valquíria Silva Santos	Brazil	23:17
3rd place, bronze medalist(s)	Keli Aparecida de Godoy	Brazil	23:38
4	Tatiane de Souza Sá	Brazil	23:52
5	Claudia Ramírez	Colombia	24:07
6	Adriana Aparecida da Silva	Brazil	24:26
7	Claudia Barajas	Colombia	25:06
8	Martha Roncería	Colombia	25:32
9	Josiene Sacramento Serqueira	Brazil	28:54

Teams
Rank
Team
Points

Brazil

Lucélia de Oliveira Peres	1
Valquíria Silva Santos	2
Keli Aparecida de Godoy	3
(Tatiane de Souza Sá)	(4)
(Adriana Aparecida da Silva)	(6)
(Josiene Sacramento Serqueira)	(9)

6

Colombia

Claudia Ramírez	5
Claudia Barajas	7
Martha Roncería	8

20

- Note: Athletes in parentheses did not score for the team result.

=== Youth (U18) women's race (3 km) ===
Individual race
Rank	Athlete	Country	Time
1st place, gold medalist(s)	Michelli de Carvalho Inácio	Brazil	11:32
2nd place, silver medalist(s)	Débora Regina Gomes Ferraz	Brazil	11:51
3rd place, bronze medalist(s)	Raphaela Ribeiro de Lima	Brazil	11:52
4	Janeth Grageda	Bolivia	11:54
5	Fabiani da Silva	Brazil	12:13
6	Silvia Hellweg	Paraguay	14:05
7	Viviana Fretes	Paraguay	14:43

Teams
Rank

Team
Brazil

Michelli de Carvalho Inácio	1
Débora Regina Gomes Ferraz	2
Raphaela Ribeiro de Lima	3
(Fabiani da Silva)	(5)

Points
6

- Note: Athletes in parentheses did not score for the team result.

== Medal table (unofficial) ==
* Host nation (Brazil)

Rank	Nation	Gold	Silver	Bronze	Total
1	Brazil*	12	6	4	22
2	Chile	4	1	0	5
3	Colombia	0	3	1	4
4	Argentina	0	2	1	3
5	Ecuador	0	1	2	3
6	Bolivia	0	1	0	1
6	Paraguay	0	1	0	1
8	Venezuela	0	0	2	2
Totals (8 entries)		16	15	10	41

- Note: Totals include both individual and team medals, with medals in the team competition counting as one medal.

== Participation ==
According to an unofficial count, 89 athletes from 8 countries participated.

- Argentina (7)
- Bolivia (3)
- Brazil (40)
- Chile (6)
- Colombia (11)
- Ecuador (5)
- Paraguay (11)
- Venezuela (6)

== See also ==
- 1999 in athletics (track and field)
