= 1998 South American Cross Country Championships =

- Organisers: CONSUDATLE
- Edition: 13th
- Date: March 7–8
- Host city: Artur Nogueira, São Paulo, Brazil
- Events: 8
- Distances: 12 km – Senior men 4 km – Men's short 8 km – Junior men (U20); 4 km – Youth men (U17); 8 km – Senior women 4 km – Women's short 6 km – Junior women (U20); 3 km – Youth women (U17)
- Participation: 117 athletes from 9 nations

The 1998 South American Cross Country Championships took place on March 7–8, 1998. The races were held in Artur Nogueira, Brazil.

Complete results, results for junior and youth competitions, and medal winners were published.

== Medallists ==
Event	Gold		Silver		Bronze	
Individual
Senior men (12 km)	Sérgio Gonçalves da Silva; Brazil	37:56	Sérgio Correa Couto; Brazil	38:13	Diego Colorado; Colombia	38:23
Men's short (4 km)	João Carlos Leite; Brazil	12:03	Daniel Bernardo das Neves; Brazil	12:07	Juan José Cruz; Argentina	12:08
Junior (U20) men (8 km)	Luís Fernando de Almeida Paula; Brazil	26:25	Jonathan Moraes Matos; Brazil	26:29	Gustavo Nicolás Pereira; Uruguay	26:31
Youth (U17) men (4 km)	Marcel Siefert; Chile	13:17	Federico Guerrero; Argentina	13:19	Jeferson de Souza Sá; Brazil	13:36
Senior women (8 km)	Rosângela Raimunda Pereira Faria; Brazil	29:50	Marlene Flores; Chile	29:56	Rosa Mila Ibarra; Colombia	30:02
Women's short (4 km)	Ana Claudia de Souza; Brazil	14:16	Janeth Caizalitín; Ecuador	14:18	Wilma Guerra; Ecuador	14:30
Junior (U20) women (6 km)	Keli Aparecida de Godoy; Brazil	22:58	Michelle Barreto da Costa; Brazil	23:00	Adriana Agudelo; Colombia	23:02
Youth (U17) women (3 km)	Tatiane de Souza Sá; Brazil	11:10	Fabiani da Silva; Brazil	11:27	Débora Regina Gomes Ferraz; Brazil	11:33
Team
Senior men	Brazil	7	Colombia	19		
Men's short	Brazil	7	Argentina	20	Paraguay	36
Junior (U20) men	Brazil	9	Colombia	23	Uruguay	26
Youth (U17) men	Argentina	14	Brazil	14	Paraguay	30
Senior women	Brazil	11	Colombia	24	Ecuador	24
Women's short	Brazil	11	Ecuador	15	Argentina	38
Junior (U20) women	Brazil	8	Argentina	30		
Youth (U17) women	Brazil	6	Argentina	15		

== Race results ==
=== Senior men's race (12 km) ===
Individual race
Rank	Athlete	Country	Time
1st place, gold medalist(s)	Sérgio Gonçalves da Silva	Brazil	37:56
2nd place, silver medalist(s)	Sérgio Correa Couto	Brazil	38:13
3rd place, bronze medalist(s)	Diego Colorado	Colombia	38:23
4	Daniel Lopes Ferreira	Brazil	38:32
5	Elias Rodrigues Bastos	Brazil	38:37
6	Jacinto Navarrete	Colombia	38:51
7	Leonardo Vieira Guedes	Brazil	39:00
8	Alejandro Semprún	Venezuela	39:05
9	Juan José Cruz	Argentina	39:17
10	Julián Jaramillo	Colombia	39:29
11	Everton Luduvice Moraes	Brazil	39:32
12	Néstor García	Uruguay	39:44
13	Marco Condori	Bolivia	40:09
14	Julián Berrío	Colombia	40:12
15	Eduardo Carrasco	Chile	40:46
16	Leonel Guevara	Venezuela	42:05
17	Ramón Aranda	Paraguay	43:48
—	Zenón Patiño	Argentina	DNF
—	Mariano Tarilo	Argentina	DNF

Teams
Rank	Team	Points
1st place, gold medalist(s)	Brazil: Sérgio Gonçalves da Silva / 1; Sérgio Correa Couto / 2; Daniel Lopes Ferreira / 4; (Elias Rodrigues Bastos) / (5); (Leonardo Vieira Guedes) / (7); (Everton Luduvice Moraes) / (11)	7
2nd place, silver medalist(s)	Colombia: Diego Colorado / 3; Jacinto Navarrete / 6; Julián Jaramillo / 10; (Julián Berrío) / (14)	19
—	Argentina: (Juan José Cruz) / (9); (Zenón Patiño) / (DNF); (Mariano Tarilo) / (DNF)	DNF

- Note: Athletes in parentheses did not score for the team result.

=== Men's short race (4 km) ===
Individual race
Rank	Athlete	Country	Time
1st place, gold medalist(s)	João Carlos Leite	Brazil	12:03
2nd place, silver medalist(s)	Daniel Bernardo das Neves	Brazil	12:07
3rd place, bronze medalist(s)	Juan José Cruz	Argentina	12:08
4	Márcio Ribeiro da Silva	Brazil	12:08
5	Ricardo Luiz da Silva	Brazil	12:15
6	Rômulo Wagner da Silva	Brazil	12:23
7	Jaime Valenzuela	Chile	12:26
8	Antonio Soliz	Argentina	12:28
9	Mariano Tarilo	Argentina	12:30
10	Zenón Patiño	Argentina	12:35
11	Oscar Mesa	Paraguay	12:51
12	Ramón Aranda	Paraguay	13:22
13	Carlos Barrientos	Paraguay	13:33
14	Lucas Panadero	Paraguay	13:54
—	Ademir Fernandes da Silva	Brazil	DNF

Teams
Rank	Team	Points
1st place, gold medalist(s)	Brazil: João Carlos Leite / 1; Daniel Bernardo das Neves / 2; Márcio Ribeiro da Silva / 4; (Ricardo Luiz da Silva) / (5); (Rômulo Wagner da Silva) / (6); (Ademir Fernandes da Silva) / (DNF)	7
2nd place, silver medalist(s)	Argentina: Juan José Cruz / 3; Antonio Soliz / 8; Mariano Tarilo / 9; (Zenón Patiño) / (10)	20
3rd place, bronze medalist(s)	Paraguay: Oscar Mesa / 11; Ramón Aranda / 12; Carlos Barrientos / 13; (Lucas Panadero) / (14)	36

- Note: Athletes in parentheses did not score for the team result.

=== Junior (U20) men's race (8 km) ===
Individual race
Rank	Athlete	Country	Time
1st place, gold medalist(s)	Luís Fernando de Almeida Paula	Brazil	26:25
2nd place, silver medalist(s)	Jonathan Moraes Matos	Brazil	26:29
3rd place, bronze medalist(s)	Gustavo Nicolás Pereira	Uruguay	26:31
4	Javier Guarín	Colombia	26:35
5	Javier Carriqueo	Argentina	26:42
6	Adelmir José Maier	Brazil	26:47
7	Arvey Rivera	Colombia	26:48
8	Marcos Silva	Uruguay	26:59
9	Oscar Meza	Paraguay	27:01
10	Edegar José Lobo	Brazil	27:14
11	Cristian Hidalgo	Chile	27:21
12	Juan Hernández	Colombia	27:53
13	Juan Carlos de Bastos	Argentina	28:02
14	Ricardo Ariel Franzón	Argentina	28:04
15	Mario Martínez	Uruguay	28:04
16	Francisco Salcedo	Chile	28:08
17	William Salgado Gomes	Brazil	28:35
18	José Alberto Mansilla	Argentina	28:47
19	William Panadero	Paraguay	28:53
20	Cristian González	Paraguay	29:00
21	Jorge de los Santos	Uruguay	29:06
22	Lucirio Garrido Jr.	Venezuela	29:18
23	Rodrigo Escobar	Chile	29:29
24	Omar Álvarez	Venezuela	29:45

Teams
Rank	Team	Points
1st place, gold medalist(s)	Brazil: Luís Fernando de Almeida Paula / 1; Jonathan Moraes Matos / 2; Adelmir José Maier / 6; (Edegar José Lobo) / (10); (William Salgado Gomes) / (17)	9
2nd place, silver medalist(s)	Colombia: Javier Guarín / 4; Arvey Rivera / 7; Juan Hernández / 12	23
3rd place, bronze medalist(s)	Uruguay: Gustavo Nicolás Pereira / 3; Marcos Silva / 8; Mario Martínez / 15	26
4	Argentina: Javier Carriqueo / 5; Juan Carlos de Bastos / 13; Ricardo Ariel Franzón / 14; (José Alberto Mansilla) / (18)	32
5	Paraguay: Oscar Meza / 9; William Panadero / 19; Cristian González / 20	48
6	Chile: Cristian Hidalgo / 11; Francisco Salcedo / 16; Rodrigo Escobar / 23	50
7	Venezuela: Lucirio Garrido Jr. / 22; Omar Álvarez / 24; Santos Márquez / 25	71

- Note: Athletes in parentheses did not score for the team result.

=== Youth (U17) men's race (4 km) ===
Individual race
Rank	Athlete	Country	Time
1st place, gold medalist(s)	Marcel Siefert	Chile	13:17
2nd place, silver medalist(s)	Federico Guerrero	Argentina	13:19
3rd place, bronze medalist(s)	Jeferson de Souza Sá	Brazil	13:36
4	Juan Gabriel Gómez	Argentina	13:38
5	Osmar Fernando Mitev	Brazil	14:04
6	Bruno Gomes Camacho	Brazil	14:05
7	Vinícius José Campos Lopes	Brazil	14:36
8	Sebastián Gesualdo	Argentina	14:40
9	Diego Agüero	Paraguay	14:50
10	Rubén Paniagua	Paraguay	14:52
11	Oscar Sotomayor	Paraguay	14:56
12	Cristian Cuello	Argentina	15:08
13	Federico Montedomeq	Paraguay	15:46

Teams
Rank	Team	Points
1st place, gold medalist(s)	Argentina: Federico Guerrero / 2; Juan Gabriel Gómez / 4; Sebastián Gesualdo / 8; (Cristian Cuello) / (12)	14
2nd place, silver medalist(s)	Brazil: Jeferson de Souza Sá / 3; Osmar Fernando Mitev / 5; Bruno Gomes Camacho / 6; (Vinícius José Campos Lopes) / (7)	14
3rd place, bronze medalist(s)	Paraguay: Diego Agüero / 9; Rubén Paniagua / 10; Oscar Sotomayor / 11; (Federico Montedomeq) / (13)	30

- Note: Athletes in parentheses did not score for the team result.

=== Senior women's race (8 km) ===
Individual race
Rank	Athlete	Country	Time
1st place, gold medalist(s)	Rosângela Raimunda Pereira Faria	Brazil	29:50
2nd place, silver medalist(s)	Marlene Flores	Chile	29:56
3rd place, bronze medalist(s)	Rosa Mila Ibarra	Colombia	30:02
4	Fabiana Cristine da Silva	Brazil	30:02
5	Wilma Guerra	Ecuador	30:11
6	Luciene Soares de Deus	Brazil	30:18
7	Janeth Caizalitín	Ecuador	30:20
8	María Eugenia Rodríguez	Colombia	30:23
9	Maria Lúcia Alves Vieira	Brazil	30:32
10	Miriam Celina Caldasso	Brazil	30:55
11	Adriana de Souza	Brazil	31:19
12	Yolanda Quimbita	Ecuador	32:01
13	Claudia Robles	Colombia	33:40
14	Gertrudis Carvajal	Venezuela	34:28

Teams
Rank	Team	Points
1st place, gold medalist(s)	Brazil: Rosângela Raimunda Pereira Faria / 1; Fabiana Cristine da Silva / 4; Luciene Soares de Deus / 6; (Maria Lúcia Alves Vieira) / (9); (Miriam Celina Caldasso) / (10); (Adriana de Souza) / (11)	11
2nd place, silver medalist(s)	Colombia: Rosa Mila Ibarra / 3; María Eugenia Rodríguez / 8; Claudia Robles / 13	24
3rd place, bronze medalist(s)	Ecuador: Wilma Guerra / 5; Janeth Caizalitín / 7; Yolanda Quimbita / 12	24

- Note: Athletes in parentheses did not score for the team result.

=== Women's short race (4 km) ===
Individual race
Rank	Athlete	Country	Time
1st place, gold medalist(s)	Ana Claudia de Souza	Brazil	14:16
2nd place, silver medalist(s)	Janeth Caizalitín	Ecuador	14:18
3rd place, bronze medalist(s)	Wilma Guerra	Ecuador	14:30
4	Maria Lúcia Alves Vieira	Brazil	14:32
5	Niusha Mancilla	Bolivia	14:33
6	Marina Cláudia Nascimento	Brazil	14:37
7	Célia Regina Ferreira dos Santos	Brazil	14:44
8	Selma Cândida dos Reis	Brazil	14:53
9	Ana Paula de Almeida Ferreira	Brazil	15:02
10	Yolanda Quimbita	Ecuador	15:05
11	Nélida Vivas	Argentina	15:17
12	Susana Rebolledo	Chile	15:18
13	Lelys Salazar	Argentina	15:25
14	Rita López	Argentina	15:27
15	María de los Ángeles Peralta	Argentina	15:40
16	Lilian López	Paraguay	17:08

Teams
Rank	Team	Points
1st place, gold medalist(s)	Brazil: Ana Claudia de Souza / 1; Maria Lúcia Alves Vieira / 4; Marina Cláudia Nascimento / 6; (Célia Regina Ferreira dos Santos) / (7); (Selma Cândida dos Reis) / (8); (Ana Paula de Almeida Ferreira) / (9)	11
2nd place, silver medalist(s)	Ecuador: Janeth Caizalitín / 2; Wilma Guerra / 3; Yolanda Quimbita / 10	15
3rd place, bronze medalist(s)	Argentina: Nélida Vivas / 11; Lelys Salazar / 13; Rita López / 14; (María de los Ángeles Peralta) / (15)	38

- Note: Athletes in parentheses did not score for the team result.

=== Junior (U20) women's race (6 km) ===
Individual race
Rank	Athlete	Country	Time
1st place, gold medalist(s)	Keli Aparecida de Godoy	Brazil	22:58
2nd place, silver medalist(s)	Michelle Barreto da Costa	Brazil	23:00
3rd place, bronze medalist(s)	Adriana Agudelo	Colombia	23:02
4	Vanesa Maraviglia	Argentina	23:13
5	Valquíria Silva Santos	Brazil	23:40
6	Liliana Tellez	Colombia	24:07
7	Adriana Aparecida da Silva	Brazil	24:37
8	Anahí Soto	Chile	24:54
9	Jacqueline Vergara	Chile	25:33
10	Ana Glória Costa do Nascimento	Brazil	25:40
11	Adriana Moreno	Venezuela	26:10
12	Vanina Susana Arrúa	Argentina	26:19
13	Andréa dos Santos Fernando	Brazil	26:30
14	Paula Cabrera	Argentina	27:19
15	Laura Umpiérrez	Argentina	27:50

Teams
Rank
Team
Points

Brazil

Keli Aparecida de Godoy	1
Michelle Barreto da Costa	2
Valquíria Silva Santos	5
(Adriana Aparecida da Silva)	(7)
(Ana Glória Costa do Nascimento)	(10)
(Andréa dos Santos Fernando)	(13)

8

Argentina

Vanesa Maraviglia	4
Vanina Susana Arrúa	12
Paula Cabrera	14
(Laura Umpiérrez)	(15)

30

- Note: Athletes in parentheses did not score for the team result.

=== Youth (U17) women's race (3 km) ===
Individual race
Rank	Athlete	Country	Time
1st place, gold medalist(s)	Tatiane de Souza Sá	Brazil	11:10
2nd place, silver medalist(s)	Fabiani da Silva	Brazil	11:27
3rd place, bronze medalist(s)	Débora Regina Gomes Ferraz	Brazil	11:33
4	Jorgelina Litterini	Argentina	11:39
5	Zulma Morabes	Argentina	11:40
6	Rita Amalia Díaz	Argentina	11:49
7	Leandra Cristina Piscor	Brazil	12:49
8	Viviana Fretes	Paraguay	12:23
9	Cristina Tovar	Venezuela	13:10
10	Sara Moreno	Paraguay	14:02

Teams
Rank
Team
Points

Brazil

Tatiane de Souza Sá	1
Fabiani da Silva	2
Débora Regina Gomes Ferraz	3
(Leandra Cristina Piscor)	(7)

6

Argentina

Jorgelina Litterini	4
Zulma Morabes	5
Rita Amalia Díaz	6

15

- Note: Athletes in parentheses did not score for the team result.

== Medal table (unofficial) ==
* Host nation (Brazil)

Rank	Nation	Gold	Silver	Bronze	Total
1	Brazil*	14	6	2	22
2	Argentina	1	4	2	7
3	Chile	1	1	0	2
4	Colombia	0	3	3	6
5	Ecuador	0	2	2	4
6	Paraguay	0	0	2	2
6	Uruguay	0	0	2	2
Totals (7 entries)		16	16	13	45

- Note: Totals include both individual and team medals, with medals in the team competition counting as one medal.

== Participation ==
According to an unofficial count, 117 athletes from 9 countries participated.

- Argentina (23)
- Bolivia (2)
- Brazil (41)
- Chile (10)
- Colombia (12)
- Ecuador (3)
- Paraguay (14)
- Uruguay (5)
- Venezuela (7)

== See also ==
- 1998 in athletics (track and field)
