= 2001 South American Cross Country Championships =

- Organisers: CONSUDATLE
- Edition: 16th
- Date: March 3–4
- Host city: Rio de Janeiro, Brazil
- Events: 8
- Distances: 12 km – Senior men 4 km – Men's short 8 km – Junior men (U20); 4 km – Youth men (U18); 8 km – Senior women 4 km – Women's short 6 km – Junior women (U20); 3 km – Youth women (U18)
- Participation: 88 + 114 local athletes from 9 nations

The 2001 South American Cross Country Championships took place on March 3–4, 2001. The races were held in Rio de Janeiro, Brazil.

Complete results, results for junior and youth competitions, and medal winners were published.

== Medallists ==
Event	Gold		Silver		Bronze	
Individual
Senior men (12 km)	Adilson Aparecido Ribeiro; Brazil	37:14	Wellington Correia Fraga; Brazil	37:22	Elenilson da Silva; Brazil	37:32
Men's short (4 km)	Hernán Oscar Cortínez; Argentina	11:25	Javier Carriqueo; Argentina	11:34	Israel dos Anjos; Brazil	11:38
Junior (U20) men (8 km)	Franck Caldeira de Almeida; Brazil	24:56	Fernando Alex Fernandes; Brazil	25:03	Miguel Angel Bárzola; Argentina	25:08
Youth (U18) men (4 km)	Rodolfo Rogério Hass; Brazil	12:35	Jeferson Douglas de Castro; Brazil	12:43	Thiago Pereira Chyaromont; Brazil	12:52
Senior women (8 km)	Adriana de Souza; Brazil	27:54	Luciene Soares de Deus; Brazil	28:00	María Paredes; Ecuador	28:38
Women's short (4 km)	María Paredes; Ecuador	13:19	Célia Regina Ferreira dos Santos; Brazil	13:32	Ana Claudia de Souza; Brazil	13:48
Junior (U20) women (6 km)	Patrícia Fernanda Lobo; Brazil	22:22	Eliane Luanda Cardoso Pereira; Brazil	22:42	Tatiane de Souza Sá; Brazil	23:01
Youth (U18) women (3 km)	Michelli de Carvalho Inácio; Brazil	10:29	Monica Maria de Lima; Brazil	10:49	Lilian Priscila Leonel; Brazil	10:50
Team
Senior men	Brazil	6	Chile	32	Ecuador	32
Men's short	Argentina	14	Chile	18	Brazil	20
Junior (U20) men	Brazil	8	Chile	26		
Youth (U18) men	Brazil	6				
Senior women	Brazil	8	Ecuador	19		
Women's short	Brazil	9	Ecuador	15		
Junior (U20) women	Brazil	6				
Youth (U18) women	Brazil	6				

== Race results ==
=== Senior men's race (12 km) ===
Individual race
Rank	Athlete	Country	Time
1st place, gold medalist(s)	Adilson Aparecido Ribeiro	Brazil	37:14
2nd place, silver medalist(s)	Wellington Correia Fraga	Brazil	37:22
3rd place, bronze medalist(s)	Elenilson da Silva	Brazil	37:32
—	Leonardo Júnior da Silva	Brazil	37:34
4	Julián Berrío	Colombia	37:37
5	Benedito Donizetti Gomes	Brazil	37:49
6	Néstor Quinapanta	Ecuador	38:00
7	Carlos Jaramillo	Chile	38:09
8	Aleudo Francisco dos Santos	Brazil	38:18
9	Jorge Cabrera	Paraguay	38:22
10	Richard Arias	Ecuador	38:38
11	Jonathan Monje	Chile	38:45
—	Alex Januario de Mendonça	Brazil	38:45
12	Elisvaldo Rodrigues de Carvalho	Brazil	39:19
13	Rolando Pillco	Bolivia	39:22
—	Ricardo dos Reis Mestrello	Brazil	39:26
14	Raúl Mora	Chile	39:27
—	Tadeus dos Santos	Brazil	39:32
15	Waldemar Cotelo	Uruguay	40:02
16	Luis Moreno	Ecuador	40:14
—	Sergio Luiz Pereira	Brazil	40:25
—	Silvio Lima Ribeiro	Brazil	40:36
17	Cristian Hidalgo	Chile	40:49
—	João Batista Oliveira de Souza	Brazil	41:01
18	Vladimir Guerra	Ecuador	41:08
—	André Luiz de Jesus Marques	Brazil	41:22
—	Helio Marcio Alencar da Silva	Brazil	41:53
—	Luís Fernando de Almeida Paula	Brazil	41:55
—	Arthur de Freitas Castro	Brazil	42:12
19	Ramón Aranda	Paraguay	42:22
—	Ivan Espirito Santo de Mello	Brazil	42:44
—	Gerardo Pereira Lima Filho	Brazil	43:01
—	Tarcísio Cordeiro de Souza	Brazil	43.08
—	Joaquim Gomes de Morais	Brazil	43:28
—	Lucas Panader	Paraguay	DNF
—	Leonel do Carmo Falcão	Brazil	DNF
—	Deoclécio Pereira Zanon	Brazil	DNF
—	Cleber Rodrigues Dias	Brazil	DNF
—	José Saraiva Frazão Júnior	Brazil	DNF
—	Paulo Roberto de Almeida Paula	Brazil	DNF
—	Luiz Carlos Fernandes da Silva	Brazil	DNF
—	Marcelo Dordennoni Donna	Brazil	DNF
—	Jorge Luiz de Jesus	Brazil	DNF
—	Daniel Lopes Ferreira	Brazil	DNF

Teams
Rank	Team	Points
1st place, gold medalist(s)	Brazil: Adilson Aparecido Ribeiro / 1; Wellington Correia Fraga / 2; Elenilson da Silva / 3; (Benedito Donizetti Gomes) / (5); (Aleudo Francisco dos Santos) / (8); (Elisvaldo Rodrigues de Carvalho) / (12)	6
2nd place, silver medalist(s)	Chile: Carlos Jaramillo / 7; Jonathan Monje / 11; Raúl Mora / 14; (Cristian Hidalgo) / (17)	32
3rd place, bronze medalist(s)	Ecuador: Néstor Quinapanta / 6; Richard Arias / 10; Luis Moreno / 16; (Vladimir Guerra) / (18)	32
4	Paraguay: Jorge Cabrera / 9; Ramón Aranda / 19; Lucas Panader / DNF	48 ?

- Note: Athletes in parentheses did not score for the team result.

=== Men's short race (4 km) ===
Individual race
Rank	Athlete	Country	Time
1st place, gold medalist(s)	Hernán Oscar Cortínez	Argentina	11:25
—	Adilson Aparecido Ribeiro	Brazil	11:31
2nd place, silver medalist(s)	Javier Carriqueo	Argentina	11:34
3rd place, bronze medalist(s)	Israel dos Anjos	Brazil	11:38
4	Carlos Jaramillo	Chile	11:40
—	Adelar José Schuler	Brazil	11:41
5	Gustavo Pereira	Uruguay	11:45
6	Jonathan Monje	Chile	11:47
—	Leonardo Júnior da Silva	Brazil	11:48
—	José Alessandro da Silva	Brazil	11:48
—	José Saraiva Frazão Junior	Brazil	11:49
7	Ricardo dos Reis Maestrelo	Brazil	11:50
8	Raúl Mora	Chile	11:51
—	Luis Carlos Fernandes da Silva	Brazil	11:53
9	Jorge Cabrera	Paraguay	12:03
—	Rubinaldo Dias Pereira	Brazil	12:06
10	Ricardo Luis da Silva	Brazil	12:07
11	José Alberto Mansilla	Argentina	12:10
12	Márcio Ribeiro da Silva	Brazil	12:14
13	Hudson Ferreira Lemos	Brazil	12:18
14	Fabián Campanini	Argentina	12:23
15	Cristian Hidalgo	Chile	12:24
—	Deuzani Rodrigues de Trindade	Brazil	12:25
—	Anísio da Costa Tavares	Brazil	12:32
—	Celso Ferreira Arantes	Brazil	12:33
—	Peterson Godoy Eustaquio de Oliveira	Brazil	12:40
—	Marcelo Rodrigues Felisberto	Brazil	12:41
16	Ramón Aranda	Paraguay	12:44
—	Nildemar Valadares Passos	Brazil	12:44
—	Augusto César da Silva Santos	Brazil	12:46
17	Lucas Panadero	Paraguay	12:53
18	Diego Agüero	Paraguay	13:01
—	Roosevelt Neves Faustino	Brazil	13:06
—	Wesley Andrade Costa	Brazil	13:07
—	Fabiano Moura dos Santos	Brazil	13:15
—	Alexandre Martins	Brazil	13:25
—	Cleber Rodrigues Dias	Brazil	13:26
—	David Dias Leite	Brazil	13:28
—	Eduardo Bruno Lopes da Silva	Brazil	13:32
—	Robson Rommel dos Santos Rocha	Brazil	13:33
—	Leonel do Carmo Falcão	Brazil	13:49
—	Márcio Cojão da Rosa	Brazil	13:59
—	Wanderson Corrêa Auer	Brazil	14:06
—	Deoclécio Pereira Zanon	Brazil	14:09
—	Marcelo Dordennoni Donna	Brazil	14:10
—	Carlos Alberto Felix da Silva	Brazil	14:55

Teams
Rank	Team	Points
1st place, gold medalist(s)	Argentina: Hernán Oscar Cortínez / 1; Javier Carriqueo / 2; José Alberto Mansilla / 11; (Fabián Campanini) / (14)	14
2nd place, silver medalist(s)	Chile: Carlos Jaramillo / 4; Jonathan Monje / 6; Raúl Mora / 8; (Cristian Hidalgo) / (15)	18
3rd place, bronze medalist(s)	Brazil: Israel dos Anjos / 3; Ricardo dos Reis Maestrelo / 7; Ricardo Luis da Silva / 10; (Márcio Ribeiro da Silva) / (12); (Hudson Ferreira Lemos) / (13)	20
4	Paraguay: Jorge Cabrera / 9; Ramón Aranda / 16; Lucas Panadero / 17; (Diego Agüero) / (18)	42

- Note: Athletes in parentheses did not score for the team result.

=== Junior (U20) men's race (8 km) ===
Individual race
Rank	Athlete	Country	Time
1st place, gold medalist(s)	Franck Caldeira de Almeida	Brazil	24:56
2nd place, silver medalist(s)	Fernando Alex Fernandes	Brazil	25:03
3rd place, bronze medalist(s)	Miguel Angel Bárzola	Argentina	25:08
—	Cláudio Sebastião Pereira da Cruz	Brazil	25:12
4	Clayton Luiz Aguiar	Brazil	25:28
5	Vinícius José Campos Lopes	Brazil	25:42
—	Vilmar Cáceres	Brazil	25:51
6	Sebastián Pino	Chile	25:53
7	Germán Sánchez	Chile	25:56
8	Juan Gabriel Gomez	Argentina	26:13
9	Jeferson de Souza Sá	Brazil	26:14
—	Eduardo Schultz	Brazil	26:25
—	Nixon Kleber Santos de Menezes	Brazil	26:13
—	Rogerio Santo	Brazil	26:35
—	Gilmar Mendes Silva Filho	Brazil	26:37
—	Linderberg dos Anjos	Brazil	26:39
10	Giovanny Amador	Colombia	26:41
11	Eduardo Arequipa	Bolivia	26:54
—	José Rogério de Oliveira Costa	Brazil	26:35
12	Rogério Rodrigues de Amorim	Brazil	27:00
—	Eduardo Paiva da Silva	Brazil	27:03
13	Luis Gamin	Chile	27:03
—	Glauber Cardoso	Brazil	27:22
—	Fabiano Peçanha	Brazil	27:27
—	Júnior Maria Rodrigues	Brazil	27:35
—	Bruno Gomes Camacho	Brazil	27:52
14	Diego Agüero	Paraguay	28:20
15	Francis Melo	Chile	28:24
—	Josué da Silva Rodrigues	Brazil	28:43
—	Luiz Henrique Amâncio	Brazil	29:43
—	José Augusto Moreira	Brazil	30:00
16	Serapio Galindo	(Peru) Perú	30:21
—	Elton da Silva Moraes	Brazil	31:49
—	Delson Silva Junior	Brazil	32:10
—	Juarez Siqueira de Souza	Brazil	DNF

Teams
Rank
Team
Points

Brazil

Franck Caldeira de Almeida	1
Fernando Alex Fernandes	2
Clayton Luiz Aguiar	4
(Vinícius José Campos Lopes)	(5)
(Jeferson de Souza Sá)	(9)
(Rogério Rodrigues de Amorim)	(12)

8

Chile

Sebastián Pino	6
Germán Sánchez	7
Luis Gamin	13
(Francis Melo)	(15)

26

- Note: Athletes in parentheses did not score for the team result.

=== Youth (U18) men's race (4 km) ===
Individual race
Rank	Athlete	Country	Time
1st place, gold medalist(s)	Rodolfo Rogério Hass	Brazil	12:35
2nd place, silver medalist(s)	Jeferson Douglas de Castro	Brazil	12:43
3rd place, bronze medalist(s)	Thiago Pereira Chyaromont	Brazil	2:52
4	Danilo Gonzaga de Souza	Brazil	12:56
—	Elton do Nascimento Mendes	Brazil	13:04
5	Gustavo López	Paraguay	13:06
6	Diego Moreno	(Peru) Perú	13:11
—	Charles Salgado Gomes	Brazil	13:18
—	Rodrigo Quiroga da Silva	Brazil	13:22
7	João Batista Arquilino Santos	Brazil	13:23
8	Edmar Antonio Silva	Brazil	13:37
—	Lourenço Nunes Gomes	Brazil	13:46
—	Rafael Cardoso	Brazil	13:47
—	Tiago Oliveira Aquino Vieira	Brazil	13:51
—	Wesley Gomes Furiati	Brazil	13:58
—	Gelson de Paiva Júnior	Brazil	14:11
—	Adevaldo Araújo de Sousa	Brazil	14:12
—	Diego de Barros Moreira	Brazil	14:13
—	Fábio Dias de Oliveira Silva	Brazil	14:20
—	Leandro Drasler Geraldo	Brazil	14:21
—	Filipe Paiva do Nascimento	Brazil	14:39
—	João Paulo do Vale da Silva	Brazil	14:43
—	Antonio da Costa Miranda	Brazil	14:47
—	Bruno Armond de Mesquita	Brazil	14:58
—	Daniel Gunnar Gonçalves	Brazil	14:59
—	Fabio Christo Pereira Pinto	Brazil	15:08
—	Carlos Eduardo de Lima da Silva	Brazil	15:22
—	Adriano Toloni Monteverde	Brazil	15:34
—	Wallace Gomes Oliveira	Brazil	17:06
—	Leomir Christo Romão	Brazil	19:37
—	Marcelo Roriz Ferreira	Brazil	19:59

Teams
Rank

Team
Brazil

Rodolfo Rogério Hass	1
Jeferson Douglas de Castro	2
Thiago Pereira Chyaromont	3
(Danilo Gonzaga de Souza)	(4)
(João Batista Arquilino Santos)	(7)
(Edmar Antonio Silva)	(8)

Points
6

- Note: Athletes in parentheses did not score for the team result.

=== Senior women's race (8 km) ===
Individual race
Rank	Athlete	Country	Time
1st place, gold medalist(s)	Adriana de Souza	Brazil	27:54
2nd place, silver medalist(s)	Luciene Soares de Deus	Brazil	28:00
—	Ednalva Laureano da Silva	Brazil	28:23
3rd place, bronze medalist(s)	María Paredes	Ecuador	28:38
4	Leone Justino da Silva	Brazil	28:48
5	Maria Lúcia Alves Vieira	Brazil	29:11
6	Elisabeth Esteves de Souza	Brazil	29:32
—	Elizabete Ferreira Cruz	Brazil	29:45
—	Jocinalva dos Santos Valentim	Brazil	29:56
7	Wilma Eugenia Guerra	Ecuador	30:04
—	Adriana Aparecida da Silva	Brazil	30:19
8	Narcisa Calderón	Ecuador	31:03
—	Denise Paiva Lucas	Brazil	31:51
9	Marlene Acuña	Ecuador	32:19
—	Conceição de Maria Oliveira	Brazil	32:29
—	Maria Auxiliadora Venancio	Brazil	32:38
—	Maria de Lourdes Oliveira	Brazil	37:02
—	Selma Cândida dos Reis	Brazil	DNF
—	Luciana Rocha de Matos	Brazil	DNF

Teams
Rank
Team
Points

Brazil

Adriana de Souza	1
Luciene Soares de Deus	2
Leone Justino da Silva	4
(Maria Lúcia Alves Vieira)	(5)
(Elisabeth Esteves de Souza)	(6)
(Selma Cândida dos Reis)	(DNF)

8

Ecuador

María Paredes	3
Wilma Eugenia Guerra	7
Narcisa Calderón	8
(Marlene Acuña)	(9)

19

- Note: Athletes in parentheses did not score for the team result.

=== Women's short race (4 km) ===
Individual race
Rank	Athlete	Country	Time
—	Selma Cândida dos Reis	Brazil	13:16
1st place, gold medalist(s)	María Paredes	Ecuador	13:19
—	Ednalva Laureano da Silva	Brazil	13:25
2nd place, silver medalist(s)	Célia Regina Ferreira dos Santos	Brazil	13:32
3rd place, bronze medalist(s)	Ana Claudia de Souza	Brazil	13:48
4	Lucélia de Oliveira Peres	Brazil	13:55
—	Jocinalva dos Santos Valentim	Brazil	13:57
5	Wilma Eugenia Guerra	Ecuador	14:00
—	Maria Lúcia Alves Vieira	Brazil	14:07
6	Tania Poma	Bolivia	14:07
7	Ana Paula de Almeida Ferreira	Brazil	14:08
8	Michele Barreto da Costa	Brazil	14:09
9	Narcisa Calderón	Ecuador	14:28
—	Adriana Aparecida da Silva	Brazil	14:42
10	Marlene Acuña	Ecuador	14:58
—	Maria Cecília Severino da Silva	Brazil	15:12
—	Conceição de Maria Oliveira	Brazil	15:16
—	Luciana Rocha de Matos	Brazil	15:31
—	Maria Auxiliadora Venancio	Brazil	15:48
—	Maria Barroso da Costa Filha	Brazil	16:19
—	Sonia Ficagna	Brazil	16:46
—	Maria de Lourdes Oliveira	Brazil	16:55
—	Ilza da Costa Silva	Brazil	17:43
—	Elisabeth Esteves de Souza	Brazil	DNF

Teams
Rank
Team
Points

Brazil

Célia Regina Ferreira dos Santos	2
Ana Claudia de Souza	3
Lucélia de Oliveira Peres	4
(Ana Paula de Almeida Ferreira)	(7)
(Michele Barreto da Costa)	(8)

9

Ecuador

María Paredes	1
Wilma Eugenia Guerra	5
Narcisa Calderón	9
(Marlene Acuña)	(10)

15

- Note: Athletes in parentheses did not score for the team result.

=== Junior (U20) women's race (6 km) ===
Individual race
Rank	Athlete	Country	Time
1st place, gold medalist(s)	Patrícia Fernanda Lobo	Brazil	22:22
2nd place, silver medalist(s)	Eliane Luanda Cardoso Pereira	Brazil	22:42
3rd place, bronze medalist(s)	Tatiane de Souza Sá	Brazil	23:01
—	Gisele Leite de Castro	Brazil	23:17
4	Erica da Silva Camargo	Brazil	23:41
5	Geruza Alfaia de Oliveira	Brazil	23:50
6	Celeste Morabes	Argentina	23:57
—	Liriane Mendes Cristiano	Brazil	24:29
7	Yolanda Caballero	Colombia	25:02
—	Leandra Cristina Piscor	Brazil	25:33
8	Jorgelina Litterini	Argentina	25:37
—	Suelen Freire da Conceiçao	Brazil	25:38
—	Graziela Aparecida Dias de Souza	Brazil	26:32
—	Débora Regina Gomes Ferraz	Brazil	DNF
—	Jenifer Araújo dos Santos	Brazil	DNF

Teams
Rank

Team
Brazil

Patrícia Fernanda Lobo	1
Eliane Luanda Cardoso Pereira	2
Tatiane de Souza Sá	3
(Erica da Silva Camargo)	(4)
(Geruza Alfaia de Oliveira)	(5)
(Jenifer Araújo dos Santos)	(DNF)

Points
6

- Note: Athletes in parentheses did not score for the team result.

=== Youth (U18) women's race (3 km) ===
Individual race
Rank	Athlete	Country	Time
1st place, gold medalist(s)	Michelli de Carvalho Inácio	Brazil	10:29
—	Fabiana Maria de Jesus	Brazil	10:34
2nd place, silver medalist(s)	Monica Maria de Lima	Brazil	10:49
3rd place, bronze medalist(s)	Lilian Priscila Leonel	Brazil	10:50
4	Marilia Alice Moraes	Brazil	10:58
—	Rejane Ester Bispo da Silva	Brazil	11:08
5	Joana D'Arc do Nascimento Santos	Brazil	11:16
—	Fernanda Nobrega dos Santos	Brazil	11:17
6	Militza Saucedo	Bolivia	11:17
—	Elisângela da Cunha Sant'Anna	Brazil	11:21
—	Cristiane da Silva Oliveira	Brazil	11:27
—	Cintia dos Santos	Brazil	11:33
7	Viviana Freitas	Paraguay	11:38
—	Graziela Aparecida Dias de Souza	Brazil	11:44
8	Elaine Matos Vieira Sobroza	Brazil	12:11
—	Alana da Silva Strini	Brazil	13:39

Teams
Rank

Team
Brazil

Michelli de Carvalho Inácio	1
Monica Maria de Lima	2
Lilian Priscila Leonel	3
(Marilia Alice Moraes)	(4)
(Joana D'Arc do Nascimento Santos)	(5)
(Elaine Matos Vieira Sobroza)	(8)

Points
6

- Note: Athletes in parentheses did not score for the team result.

== Medal table (unofficial) ==
* Host nation (Brazil)

Rank	Nation	Gold	Silver	Bronze	Total
1	Brazil*	13	7	7	27
2	Argentina	2	1	1	4
3	Ecuador	1	2	2	5
4	Chile	0	3	0	3
Totals (4 entries)		16	13	10	39

- Note: Totals include both individual and team medals, with medals in the team competition counting as one medal.

== Participation ==
According to an unofficial count, 88 athletes (+ 114 local athletes) from 9 countries participated.

- Argentina (8)
- Bolivia (4)
- Brazil (46+114 local)
- Chile (8)
- Colombia (3)
- Ecuador (8)
- Paraguay (7)
- (Peru) Perú (2)
- Uruguay (2)

== See also ==
- 2001 in athletics (track and field)
