= 2002 South American Cross Country Championships =

- Organisers: CONSUDATLE
- Edition: 17th
- Date: February 23–24
- Host city: Santa Cruz de la Sierra, Santa Cruz, Bolivia
- Events: 8
- Distances: 12 km – Senior men 4 km – Men's short 8 km – Junior men (U20); 4 km – Youth men (U18); 8 km – Senior women 4 km – Women's short 6 km – Junior women (U20); 3 km – Youth women (U18)
- Participation: 72 athletes from 7 nations

The 2002 South American Cross Country Championships took place on February 23–24, 2002. The races were held in Santa Cruz de la Sierra, Bolivia.

Complete results, results for junior and youth competitions, and medal winners were published.

== Medallists ==
Event	Gold		Silver		Bronze	
Individual
Senior men (12 km)	Jonathan Monje; Chile	38:45	Julián Berrío; Colombia	38:50	Carlos Jaramillo; Chile	38:51
Men's short (4 km)	Hudson Santos de Souza; Brazil	11:57	Javier Adolfo Carriqueo; Argentina	12:11	Jonathan Monje; Chile	12:13
Junior (U20) men (8 km)	Fernando Alex Fernandes; Brazil	26:41	Maximiliano Alonso Sánchez; Argentina	27:06	Marcelo Zalles; Bolivia	27:22
Youth (U18) men (4 km)	Gilialdo Koball; Brazil	12:59	Freddy Espinoza; Colombia	13:32	Alexis Maureira; Chile	13:35
Senior women (8 km)	Adriana de Souza; Brazil	29:54	Bertha Sánchez; Colombia	30:54	Wilma Guerra; Ecuador	31:11
Women's short (4 km)	Bertha Sánchez; Colombia	14:02	Silvia Paredes; Ecuador	14:08	Marily dos Santos; Brazil	14:19
Junior (U20) women (6 km)	Ruby Riativa; Colombia	23:50	Susana Aburto; Chile	24:49	Magaly Crispin; Bolivia	25:39
Youth (U18) women (3 km)	Fernanda Maria Silva; Brazil	10:55	Elizabeth Choquevillca; Bolivia	11:06	Militza Saucedo; Bolivia	11:21
Team
Senior men	Chile	14	Colombia	14	Bolivia	25
Men's short	Chile	12	Argentina	15	Bolivia	27
Junior (U20) men	Bolivia	14				
Youth (U18) men	Bolivia	18				
Senior women	Ecuador	13	Chile	21		
Women's short	Ecuador	13	Chile	23	Bolivia	28
Junior (U20) women	Bolivia	12				
Youth (U18) women	Bolivia	9				

== Race results ==
=== Senior men's race (12 km) ===
Individual race
Rank	Athlete	Country	Time
1st place, gold medalist(s)	Jonathan Monje	Chile	38:45
2nd place, silver medalist(s)	Julián Berrío	Colombia	38:50
3rd place, bronze medalist(s)	Carlos Jaramillo	Chile	38:51
4	Rolando Pillco	Bolivia	39:07
5	Javier Alexander Guarín	Colombia	39:14
6	Vladimir Guerra	Ecuador	39:24
7	Jorge Real	Colombia	39:37
8	Guido Bustillos	Ecuador	39:38
9	Marco Condori	Bolivia	39:44
10	Miguel Meléndez	Chile	39:55
11	Wellington Correia Fraga	Brazil	40:36
12	Giovanny Morejón	Bolivia	40:47
13	Néstor Quinapanta	Ecuador	41:28
14	Cristian Rogelio	Chile	41:44
15	Alejandro Mamani	Bolivia	43:11
16	Pablo Jiménez	Uruguay	49:23
—	Eduardo Aruquipa	Bolivia	DNF
—	Richard Arias	Ecuador	DNF

Teams
Rank	Team	Points
1st place, gold medalist(s)	Chile: Jonathan Monje / 1; Carlos Jaramillo / 3; Guido Bustillos / 8; (Miguel Meléndez) / (10); (Cristian Rogelio) / (14)	14
2nd place, silver medalist(s)	Colombia: Julián Berrío / 2; Javier Alexander Guarín / 5; Jorge Real / 7	14
3rd place, bronze medalist(s)	Bolivia: Rolando Pillco / 4; Marco Condori / 9; Giovanny Morejón / 12; (Alejandro Mamani) / (15); (Eduardo Aruquipa) / (DNF)	25
4	Ecuador: Vladimir Guerra / 6; Guido Bustillos / 8; Néstor Quinapanta / 13; (Richard Arias) / (DNF)	27

- Note: Athletes in parentheses did not score for the team result.

=== Men's short race (4 km) ===
Individual race
Rank	Athlete	Country	Time
1st place, gold medalist(s)	Hudson Santos de Souza	Brazil	11:57
2nd place, silver medalist(s)	Javier Adolfo Carriqueo	Argentina	12:11
3rd place, bronze medalist(s)	Jonathan Monje	Chile	12:13
4	Carlos Jaramillo	Chile	12:21
5	Miguel Meléndez	Chile	12:41
6	José Mansilla	Argentina	12:50
7	Miguel Angel Bárzola	Argentina	12:53
8	Wilfredo Calizaya	Bolivia	12:57
9	Juan Carlos Echalar	Bolivia	13:01
10	Mariano Mamani	Bolivia	13:03
11	Denis Velázquez	Bolivia	13:05
12	Moisés Cipriani	Bolivia	13:05
13	Francis Melo	Chile	13:36
14	Miguel Nino	Bolivia	13:37

Teams
Rank	Team	Points
1st place, gold medalist(s)	Chile: Jonathan Monje / 3; Carlos Jaramillo / 4; Miguel Meléndez / 5; (Francis Melo) / (13)	12
2nd place, silver medalist(s)	Argentina: Javier Adolfo Carriqueo / 2; José Mansilla / 6; Miguel Angel Bárzola / 7	15
3rd place, bronze medalist(s)	Bolivia: Wilfredo Calizaya / 8; Juan Carlos Echalar / 9; Mariano Mamani / 10; (Denis Velázquez) / (11); (Moisés Cipriani) / (12); (Miguel Nino) / (14)	27

- Note: Athletes in parentheses did not score for the team result.

=== Junior (U20) men's race (8 km) ===
Individual race
Rank	Athlete	Country	Time
1st place, gold medalist(s)	Fernando Alex Fernandes	Brazil	26:41
2nd place, silver medalist(s)	Maximiliano Alonso Sánchez	Argentina	27:06
3rd place, bronze medalist(s)	Marcelo Zalles	Bolivia	27:22
4	Mauricio Peña	Chile	28:06
5	Ever Apaza	Bolivia	28:12
6	Juan Daniel Quispe	Bolivia	28:32
7	Jason Gutiérrez	Colombia	28:59
8	Ruddy Choque	Bolivia	29:12
9	José Paul Avila	Bolivia	30:01

Teams
Rank

Team
Bolivia

Marcelo Zalles	3
Ever Apaza	5
Juan Daniel Quispe	6
(Ruddy Choque)	(8)
(José Paul Avila)	(9)

Points
14

- Note: Athletes in parentheses did not score for the team result.

=== Youth (U18) men's race (4 km) ===
Individual race
Rank	Athlete	Country	Time
1st place, gold medalist(s)	Gilialdo Koball	Brazil	12:59
2nd place, silver medalist(s)	Freddy Espinoza	Colombia	13:32
3rd place, bronze medalist(s)	Alexis Maureira	Chile	13:35
4	Víctor Gilbez	Argentina	14:29
5	Ebenezer Churqui	Bolivia	15:31
6	Ronald Morales	Bolivia	15:47
7	Alán Durán	Bolivia	15:48

Teams
Rank

Team
Bolivia

Ebenezer Churqui	5
Ronald Morales	6
Alán Durán	7

Points
18

- Note: Athletes in parentheses did not score for the team result.

=== Senior women's race (8 km) ===
Individual race
Rank	Athlete	Country	Time
1st place, gold medalist(s)	Adriana de Souza	Brazil	29:54
2nd place, silver medalist(s)	Bertha Sánchez	Colombia	30:54
3rd place, bronze medalist(s)	Wilma Guerra	Ecuador	31:11
4	Narcisa Calderón	Ecuador	31:14
5	Marlene Flores	Chile	31:20
6	Silvia Paredes	Ecuador	31:33
7	Luz Silva	Chile	31:49
8	Gabriela Cevallos	Ecuador	31:57
9	Julia del Río	Chile	33:05
10	Tania Poma	Bolivia	33:51
11	Nemia Coca	Bolivia	33:59
—	Sonia Calizaya	Bolivia	DNF

Teams
Rank	Team	Points
1st place, gold medalist(s)	Ecuador: Wilma Guerra / 3; Narcisa Calderón / 4; Silvia Paredes / 6; (Gabriela Cevallos) / (8)	13
2nd place, silver medalist(s)	Chile: Marlene Flores / 5; Luz Silva / 7; Julia del Río / 9	21
—	Bolivia: (Tania Poma) / (10); (Nemia Coca) / (11); (Sonia Calizaya) / (DNF)	DNF

- Note: Athletes in parentheses did not score for the team result.

=== Women's short race (4 km) ===
Individual race
Rank	Athlete	Country	Time
1st place, gold medalist(s)	Bertha Sánchez	Colombia	14:02
2nd place, silver medalist(s)	Silvia Paredes	Ecuador	14:08
3rd place, bronze medalist(s)	Marily dos Santos	Brazil	14:19
4	Luz Silva	Chile	14:25
5	Gabriela Cevallos	Ecuador	14:40
6	Wilma Guerra	Ecuador	14:47
7	Marlene Flores	Chile	14:48
8	Tania Poma	Bolivia	14:53
9	Ibeth Budia	Bolivia	14:58
10	Narcisa Calderón	Ecuador	15:02
11	Sonia Calizaya	Bolivia	15:32
12	Julia del Río	Chile	15:37
13	Claudia Villalba	Bolivia	15:41

Teams
Rank	Team	Points
1st place, gold medalist(s)	Ecuador: Silvia Paredes / 2; Gabriela Cevallos / 5; Wilma Guerra / 6; (Narcisa Calderón) / (10)	13
2nd place, silver medalist(s)	Chile: Luz Silva / 4; Marlene Flores / 7; Julia del Río / 12	23
3rd place, bronze medalist(s)	Bolivia: Tania Poma / 8; Ibeth Budia / 9; Sonia Calizaya / 11; (Claudia Villalba) / (13)	28

- Note: Athletes in parentheses did not score for the team result.

=== Junior (U20) women's race (6 km) ===
Individual race
Rank	Athlete	Country	Time
1st place, gold medalist(s)	Ruby Riativa	Colombia	23:50
2nd place, silver medalist(s)	Susana Aburto	Chile	24:49
3rd place, bronze medalist(s)	Magaly Crispin	Bolivia	25:39
4	Mery Quispe	Bolivia	26:22
5	Isidora Canavari	Bolivia	27:18

Teams
Rank

Team
Bolivia

Magaly Crispin	3
Mery Quispe	4
Isidora Canavari	5

Points
12

- Note: Athletes in parentheses did not score for the team result.

=== Youth (U18) women's race (3 km) ===
Individual race
Rank	Athlete	Country	Time
1st place, gold medalist(s)	Fernanda Maria Silva	Brazil	10:55
2nd place, silver medalist(s)	Elizabeth Choquevillca	Bolivia	11:06
3rd place, bronze medalist(s)	Militza Saucedo	Bolivia	11:21
4	Beatriz Quispe	Bolivia	11:28
5	Denise Talanilla	Chile	12:17
6	Evelin Ahois	Bolivia	12:41
7	Vianka Pereira	Bolivia	12:42

Teams
Rank

Team
Bolivia

Elizabeth Choquevillca	2
Militza Saucedo	3
Beatriz Quispe	4
(Evelin Ahois)	(6)
(Vianka Pereira)	(7)

Points
9

- Note: Athletes in parentheses did not score for the team result.

== Medal table (unofficial) ==
* Host nation (Bolivia)

Rank	Nation	Gold	Silver	Bronze	Total
1	Brazil	5	0	1	6
2	Bolivia*	4	1	6	11
3	Chile	3	3	3	9
4	Colombia	2	4	0	6
5	Ecuador	2	1	1	4
6	Argentina	0	3	0	3
Totals (6 entries)		16	12	11	39

- Note: Totals include both individual and team medals, with medals in the team competition counting as one medal.

== Participation ==
According to an unofficial count, 72 athletes from 7 countries participated.

- Argentina (5)
- Bolivia (32)
- Brazil (7)
- Chile (12)
- Colombia (7)
- Ecuador (8)
- Uruguay (1)

== See also ==
- 2002 in athletics (track and field)
