= 1997 South American Cross Country Championships =

- Organisers: CONSUDATLE
- Edition: 12th
- Date: February 22–23
- Host city: Comodoro Rivadavia, Chubut, Argentina
- Venue: Santa Lucía Golf Club
- Events: 6
- Distances: 12 km – Senior men 8 km – Junior men (U20); 4 km – Youth men (U17); 6 km – Senior women 4 km – Junior women (U20); 3 km – Youth women (U17)
- Participation: 82 + 1 guest athletes from 6 + 1 guest nations

The 1997 South American Cross Country Championships took place on February 22–23, 1997. The races were held at the Santa Lucía Golf Club in Comodoro Rivadavia, Argentina.

Complete results, results for junior and youth competitions, and medal winners were published.

== Medallists ==
Event	Gold		Silver		Bronze	
Individual
Senior men (12 km)	Elenilson da Silva; Brazil	38:01	Herder Vásquez; Colombia	38:03	Leonardo Vieira Guedes; Brazil	38:23
Junior (U20) men (8 km)	André Pereira da Silva; Brazil	6:52	Jonatann Moraes Matos; Brazil	26:53	Paulo Roberto de Almeida Paula; Brazil	26:53
Youth (U17) men (4 km)	Jeferson de Souza Sá; Brazil	13:22	Leonardo Milani; Argentina	13:28	Pedro Herrera; Argentina	13:33
Senior women (6 km)	Stella Castro; Colombia	21:18	Érika Olivera; Chile	21:31	Nadir Sabino de Siqueira; Brazil	21:56
Junior (U20) women (4 km)	Fabiana Cristine da Silva; Brazil	14:26	Valquíria Silva Santos; Brazil	14:36	Bertha Sánchez; Colombia	14:57
Youth (U17) women (3 km)	Fabiani da Silva; Brazil	11:38	Natalia Domínguez; Argentina	11:58	Miriam Valdez; Argentina	12:08
Team
Senior men	Brazil	8	Colombia	13	Argentina	24
Junior (U20) men	Brazil	6	Argentina	23	Chile	23
Youth (U17) men	Argentina	6				
Senior women	Brazil	15	Chile	15	Colombia	17
Junior (U20) women	Chile	32				
Youth (U17) women	Argentina	6				

== Race results ==
=== Senior men's race (12 km) ===
Individual race
Rank	Athlete	Country	Time
1st place, gold medalist(s)	Elenilson da Silva	Brazil	38:01
2nd place, silver medalist(s)	Herder Vásquez	Colombia	38:03
3rd place, bronze medalist(s)	Leonardo Vieira Guedes	Brazil	38:23
4	Benedito Donizetti Gomes	Brazil	38:23
5	Elias Rodrigues Bastos	Brazil	38:29
6	José Teles de Souza	Brazil	38:31
7	Jacinto Navarrete	Colombia	38:38
8	Sérgio Correa Couto	Brazil	38:55
9	William Vásquez	Colombia	39:05
10	Mauricio Ladino	Colombia	39:06
11	Rubén Álvarez	Argentina	39:17
12	Zenón Patiño	Argentina	39:24
13	Julián Berrío	Colombia	39:33
14	José Montenegro	Argentina	39:48
15	Antonio Ibañez	Argentina	40:04
16	Iván Noms	Argentina	40:15
17	Oscar Raimo	Argentina	40:17
18	José Chacón	Argentina	43:31
—	Leonardo Malgor	Argentina	DNF

Teams
Rank	Team	Points
1st place, gold medalist(s)	Brazil: Elenilson da Silva / 1; Leonardo Vieira Guedes / 3; Benedito Donizetti Gomes / 4; (Elias Rodrigues Bastos) / (n/s); (José Teles de Souza) / (n/s); (Sérgio Correa Couto) / (n/s)	8
2nd place, silver medalist(s)	Colombia: Herder Vásquez / 2; Jacinto Navarrete / 5; William Vásquez / 6; (Mauricio Ladino) / (n/s); (Julián Berrío) / (n/s)	13
3rd place, bronze medalist(s)	Argentina: Rubén Álvarez / 7; Zenón Patiño / 8; José Montenegro / 9; (Antonio Ibañez) / (n/s); (Iván Noms) / (n/s); (Oscar Raimo) / (n/s); (José Chacón) / (n/s); (Leonardo Malgor) / (DNF)	24

- Note: Athletes in parentheses did not score for the team result. (n/s: nonscorer)

=== Junior (U20) men's race (8 km) ===
Individual race
Rank	Athlete	Country	Time
1st place, gold medalist(s)	André Pereira da Silva	Brazil	6:52
2nd place, silver medalist(s)	Jonatann Moraes Matos	Brazil	26:53
3rd place, bronze medalist(s)	Paulo Roberto de Almeida Paula	Brazil	26:53
4	Luiz Fernando de Almeida Paula	Brazil	26:55
5	Gustavo Nicolás Pereira	Uruguay	26:57
6	Carlos Barrientos	Paraguay	27:03
7	Karin Marin	Chile	27:11
8	Javier Carriqueo	Argentina	27:15
9	Cristian Hidalgo	Chile	27:18
10	Juan Carlos de Bastos	Argentina	27:19
11	Cristóbal Valenzuela	Argentina	27:23
12	Oscar Mesa	Paraguay	27:46
13	Francisco Salcedo	Chile	27:52
14	Simón Veuthey	Argentina	28:05
15	Roberto Carrizo	Argentina	28:06
16	Angelo Álvarez	Chile	28:29
17	Alejandro Godoy	Argentina	28:42
18	Lucas Panadero	Paraguay	29:16
—	Alejandro Rivera	Paraguay	DNF

Teams
Rank	Team	Points
1st place, gold medalist(s)	Brazil: André Pereira da Silva / 1; Jonatann Moraes Matos / 2; Paulo Roberto de Almeida Paula / 3; (Luiz Fernando de Almeida Paula) / (n/s)	6
2nd place, silver medalist(s)	Argentina: Javier Carriqueo / 6; Juan Carlos de Bastos / 8; Cristóbal Valenzuela / 9; (Simón Veuthey) / (n/s); (Roberto Carrizo) / (n/s); (Alejandro Godoy) / (n/s)	23
3rd place, bronze medalist(s)	Chile: Karin Marin / 5; Cristian Hidalgo / 7; Francisco Salcedo / 11; (Angelo Álvarez) / (n/s)	23
4	Paraguay: Carlos Barrientos / 4; Oscar Mesa / 10; Lucas Panadero / 12; (Alejandro Rivera) / (DNF)	27

- Note: Athletes in parentheses did not score for the team result. (n/s: nonscorer)

=== Youth (U17) men's race (4 km) ===
Individual race
Rank	Athlete	Country	Time
1st place, gold medalist(s)	Jeferson de Souza Sá	Brazil	13:22
2nd place, silver medalist(s)	Leonardo Milani	Argentina	13:28
3rd place, bronze medalist(s)	Pedro Herrera	Argentina	13:33
4	Enrique Veuthey	Argentina	13:45
5	Diego Bastia	Argentina	14:02

Teams
Rank

Team
Argentina

Leonardo Milani	1
Pedro Herrera	2
Enrique Veuthey	3
(Diego Bastia)	(n/s)

Points
6

- Note: Athletes in parentheses did not score for the team result. (n/s: nonscorer)

=== Senior women's race (6 km) ===
Individual race
Rank	Athlete	Country	Time
1st place, gold medalist(s)	Stella Castro	Colombia	21:18
2nd place, silver medalist(s)	Érika Olivera	Chile	21:31
3rd place, bronze medalist(s)	Nadir Sabino de Siqueira	Brazil	21:56
4	Flor Venegas	Chile	22:03
5	Maria Justina Santos Santana	Brazil	22:14
6	María Eugenia Rodríguez	Colombia	22:27
7	Berenice Dias de Meira	Brazil	22:31
8	Lelys Salazar	Argentina	22:33
9	Rizoneide Wanderley	Brazil	22:33
10	Leontina Céspedes	Chile	22:50
11	Esneda Londoño	Colombia	22:53
12	María de los Ángeles Peralta	Argentina	22:58
—	Ines Eppers	United States	22:59
13	Nélida Vivas	Argentina	23:03
14	Susana Rebolledo	Chile	23:47
15	Sandra Ávila	Argentina	24:05
16	Stella Jerez	Argentina	24:53
17	Silvia Antúnez	Argentina	25:10

Teams
Rank	Team	Points
1st place, gold medalist(s)	Brazil: Nadir Sabino de Siqueira / 3; Maria Justina Santos Santana / 5; Berenice Dias de Meira / 7; (Rizoneide Wanderley) / (n/s)	15
2nd place, silver medalist(s)	Chile: Érika Olivera / 2; Flor Venegas / 4; Leontina Céspedes / 9; (Susana Rebolledo) / (n/s)	15
3rd place, bronze medalist(s)	Colombia: Stella Castro / 1; María Eugenia Rodríguez / 6; Esneda Londoño / 10	17
4	Argentina: Lelys Salazar / 8; María de los Ángeles Peralta / 11; Nélida Vivas / 12; (Sandra Ávila) / (n/s); (Stella Jerez) / (n/s); (Silvia Antúnez) / (n/s)	31

- Note: Athletes in parentheses did not score for the team result. (n/s: nonscorer)

=== Junior (U20) women's race (4 km) ===
Individual race
Rank	Athlete	Country	Time
1st place, gold medalist(s)	Fabiana Cristine da Silva	Brazil	14:26
2nd place, silver medalist(s)	Valquíria Silva Santos	Brazil	14:36
3rd place, bronze medalist(s)	Bertha Sánchez	Colombia	14:57
4	Erika Abril	Colombia	15:08
5	Vanesa Maraviglia	Argentina	15:18
6	Ana Joaquina Rondón	Colombia	15:22
7	Karin Salcedo	Chile	15:29
8	Isabel Aparecida Boldo	Brazil	15:34
9	Ana Costa do Nascimento	Brazil	15:38
10	Mariela Davico	Argentina	15:44
11	Vanesa Davico	Argentina	15:50
12	Claudia Salcedo	Chile	16:11
13	Mabel Valenzuela	Chile	16:15
14	Claudia Cornejo	Chile	16:34
15	Romina Novaretti	Argentina	16:44
16	Teresa Avila	Argentina	16:54
17	Olga Santomingo	Argentina	16:59

Teams
Rank	Team	Points
4	Chile	32

- Note: Athletes in parentheses did not score for the team result. (n/s: nonscorer)

=== Youth (U17) women's race (3 km) ===
Individual race
Rank	Athlete	Country	Time
1st place, gold medalist(s)	Fabiani da Silva	Brazil	11:38
2nd place, silver medalist(s)	Natalia Domínguez	Argentina	11:58
3rd place, bronze medalist(s)	Miriam Valdez	Argentina	12:08
4	Adriana Tapia	Argentina	12:15
5	Luciana de Esteban	Argentina	12:16

Teams
Rank

Team
Argentina

Natalia Domínguez	1
Miriam Valdez	2
Adriana Tapia	3
(Luciana de Esteban)	(n/s)

Points
6

- Note: Athletes in parentheses did not score for the team result. (n/s: nonscorer)

== Medal table (unofficial) ==
* Host nation (Argentina)

Rank	Nation	Gold	Silver	Bronze	Total
1	Brazil	9	2	3	14
2	Argentina*	2	3	4	9
3	Colombia	1	3	2	6
4	Chile	0	2	1	3
Totals (4 entries)		12	10	10	32

- Note: Totals include both individual and team medals, with medals in the team competition counting as one medal.

== Participation ==
According to an unofficial count, 82 athletes (+ 1 guest) from 6 countries (+ 1 guest country) participated.

- Argentina (34)
- Brazil (20)
- Chile (12)
- Colombia (11)
- Paraguay (4)
- Uruguay (1)

Guest country:

- United States (1)

== See also ==
- 1997 in athletics (track and field)
