= 1996 South American Cross Country Championships =

- Organisers: CONSUDATLE
- Edition: 11th
- Date: February 24–25
- Host city: Asunción, Paraguay
- Venue: Club Mbiguá
- Events: 6
- Distances: 12 km – Senior men 8 km – Junior men (U20); 4 km – Youth men (U17); 6 km – Senior women 4 km – Junior women (U20); 3 km – Youth women (U17)
- Participation: 108 athletes from 7 nations

The 1996 South American Cross Country Championships took place on February 24–25, 1996. The races were held at the Club Mbiguá in Asunción, Paraguay.

Complete results, results for junior and youth competitions, and medal winners were published.

== Medallists ==
| Event | Gold | | Silver | | Bronze | |
|---|---|---|---|---|---|---|
Individual
| Senior men (12 km) | Herder Vásquez; Colombia | 38:19 | Daniel Lopes Ferreira; Brazil | 38:27 | Sérgio Gonçalves da Silva; Brazil | 38:45 |
| Junior (U20) men (8 km) | Paulo Vitor Lunkes; Brazil | 25:54 | Marilson Gomes dos Santos; Brazil | 26:09 | Hudson Santos de Souza; Brazil | 26:20 |
| Youth (U17) men (4 km) | Pedro Herrera; Argentina | 13:35 | Juan Marinoni; Argentina | 13:42 | Antonio Baldi; Argentina | 13:48 |
| Senior women (6 km) | Stella Castro; Colombia | 21:43 | Érika Olivera; Chile | 21:51 | Nadir Sabino de Siqueira; Brazil | 21:52 |
| Junior (U20) women (4 km) | Bertha Sánchez; Colombia | 14:21 | Fabiana Cristine da Silva; Brazil | 14:33 | Valquíria Silva Santos; Brazil | 14:56 |
| Youth (U17) women (3 km) | Vanesa Maraviglia; Argentina | 11:04 | Vanesa Davico; Argentina | 11:22 | María Rodríguez; Uruguay | 11:42 |
Team
| Senior men | Brazil | 17 | Colombia | 21 | Argentina | 40 |
| Junior (U20) men | Brazil | 6 | Argentina | 18 | Colombia | 24 |
| Youth (U17) men | Argentina | 6 | Paraguay | 15 | | |
| Senior women | Brazil | 8 | Argentina | 13 | Paraguay | 24 |
| Junior (U20) women | Brazil | 11 | Colombia | 15 | Argentina | 20 |
| Youth (U17) women | Argentina | 6 | Paraguay | 15 | | |

== Race results ==
=== Senior men's race (12 km) ===
Individual race
| Rank | Athlete | Country | Time |
|---|---|---|---|
| 1st place, gold medalist(s) | Herder Vásquez | Colombia | 38:19 |
| 2nd place, silver medalist(s) | Daniel Lopes Ferreira | Brazil | 38:27 |
| 3rd place, bronze medalist(s) | Sérgio Gonçalves da Silva | Brazil | 38:45 |
| 4 | José Guerrero | Colombia | 39:01 |
| 5 | Elenilson da Silva | Brazil | 39:09 |
| 6 | Pedro Rojas | Colombia | 39:13 |
| 7 | Eder Moreno Fialho | Brazil | 39:22 |
| 8 | Tranquilino Valenzuela | Argentina | 39:25 |
| 9 | Darío Nuñez | Argentina | 39:40 |
| 10 | William Roldán | Colombia | 39:51 |
| 11 | Leonardo Vieira Guedes | Brazil | 40:04 |
| 12 | Oscar Cortínez | Argentina | 40:20 |
| 13 | José Montenegro | Argentina | 40:27 |
| 14 | Néstor García | Uruguay | 40:45 |
| 15 | Antonio Soliz | Argentina | 41:11 |
| 16 | Antonio Ibañez | Argentina | 42:28 |
| 17 | Humberto Hermosilla | Paraguay | 44:25 |
| 18 | Javier Benítez | Uruguay | 45:33 |
| 19 | Ademar Araujo | Uruguay | 45:40 |
| 20 | Ángel Leyton | Uruguay | 46:28 |
| 21 | Ramón Aranda | Paraguay | 48:06 |
| 22 | Gustavo Ortega | Paraguay | 48:14 |
| 23 | Pedro Rodríguez | Paraguay | 49:44 |
| 24 | Juan Toledo | Paraguay | 51:09 |
| — | Daniel Castro | Argentina | DNF |
| — | Porfirio Méndez | Paraguay | DNF |
| — | Rubén Navarro | Paraguay | DNF |
| — | Juan Pablo Juárez | Argentina | DNF |

Teams
| Rank | Team | Points |
|---|---|---|
| 1st place, gold medalist(s) | Brazil: Daniel Lopes Ferreira / 2; Sérgio Gonçalves da Silva / 3; Elenilson da Silva / 5; Eder Moreno Fialho / 7; (Leonardo Vieira Guedes) / (n/s) | 17 |
| 2nd place, silver medalist(s) | Colombia: Herder Vásquez / 1; José Guerrero / 4; Pedro Rojas / 6; William Roldán / 10 | 21 |
| 3rd place, bronze medalist(s) | Argentina: Tranquilino Valenzuela / 8; Darío Nuñez / 9; Oscar Cortínez / 11; José Montenegro / 12; (Antonio Soliz) / (n/s); (Antonio Ibañez) / (n/s); (Daniel Castro) / (DNF); (Juan Pablo Juárez) / (DNF) | 40 |
| 4 | Uruguay: Néstor García / 13; Javier Benítez / 15; Ademar Araujo / 16; Ángel Leyton / 17 | 61 |
| 5 | Paraguay: Humberto Hermosilla / 14; Ramón Aranda / 18; Gustavo Ortega / 19; Pedro Rodríguez / 20; (Juan Toledo) / (n/s); (Porfirio Méndez) / (DNF); (Rubén Navarro) / (DNF) | 71 |

- Note: Athletes in parentheses did not score for the team result. (n/s: nonscorer)

=== Junior (U20) men's race (8 km) ===
Individual race
| Rank | Athlete | Country | Time |
|---|---|---|---|
| 1st place, gold medalist(s) | Paulo Vitor Lunkes | Brazil | 25:54 |
| 2nd place, silver medalist(s) | Marilson Gomes dos Santos | Brazil | 26:09 |
| 3rd place, bronze medalist(s) | Hudson Santos de Souza | Brazil | 26:20 |
| 4 | Julián Peralta | Argentina | 26:28 |
| 5 | Mauricio Ladino | Colombia | 26:45 |
| 6 | Rômulo Wagner da Silva | Brazil | 26:57 |
| 7 | Rubén Vera | Argentina | 27:12 |
| 8 | Oscar Meza | Paraguay | 27:15 |
| 9 | Cristóbal Valenzuela | Argentina | 27:32 |
| 10 | Nelson González | Colombia | 27:37 |
| 11 | Ariel Frías | Argentina | 27:50 |
| 12 | Marcos Silva | Uruguay | 28:01 |
| 13 | Wilmer Avendaño | Colombia | 28:19 |
| 14 | Gustavo Pereira | Uruguay | 28:23 |
| 15 | Carlos Barrientos | Paraguay | 28:33 |
| 16 | Alberto González | Argentina | 29:18 |
| 17 | Israel Recalde | Paraguay | 31:28 |
| 18 | Lucas Panadero | Paraguay | 31:55 |
| 19 | Rodrigo Brambilla | Paraguay | 32:58 |
| — | Hugo Máscaro | Paraguay | DNF |

Teams
| Rank | Team | Points |
|---|---|---|
| 1st place, gold medalist(s) | Brazil: Paulo Vitor Lunkes / 1; Marilson Gomes dos Santos / 2; Hudson Santos de Souza / 3; (Rômulo Wagner da Silva) / (n/s) | 6 |
| 2nd place, silver medalist(s) | Argentina: Julián Peralta / 4; Rubén Vera / 6; Cristóbal Valenzuela / 8; (Ariel Frías) / (n/s); (Alberto González) / (n/s) | 18 |
| 3rd place, bronze medalist(s) | Colombia: Mauricio Ladino / 5; Nelson González / 9; Wilmer Avendaño / 10 | 24 |
| 4 | Paraguay: Oscar Meza / 7; Carlos Barrientos / 11; Israel Recalde / 12; (Lucas Panadero) / (n/s); (Rodrigo Brambilla) / (n/s); (Hugo Máscaro) / (DNF) | 30 |

- Note: Athletes in parentheses did not score for the team result. (n/s: nonscorer)

=== Youth (U17) men's race (4 km) ===
Individual race
| Rank | Athlete | Country | Time |
|---|---|---|---|
| 1st place, gold medalist(s) | Pedro Herrera | Argentina | 13:35 |
| 2nd place, silver medalist(s) | Juan Marinoni | Argentina | 13:42 |
| 3rd place, bronze medalist(s) | Antonio Baldi | Argentina | 13:48 |
| 4 | Gustavo Fontana | Argentina | 14:06 |
| 5 | Christian González | Paraguay | 14:16 |
| 6 | Daniel Casas | Argentina | 14:57 |
| 7 | William Panadero | Paraguay | 15:13 |
| 8 | Daniel Ruíz | Paraguay | 15:37 |
| 9 | Fernando Portillo | Paraguay | 15:50 |
| 10 | Fernando Orué | Paraguay | 15:51 |
| 11 | Carlos Ferreira | Paraguay | 16:53 |

Teams
Rank
Team
Points

Argentina

| Pedro Herrera | 1 |
| Juan Marinoni | 2 |
| Antonio Baldi | 3 |
| (Gustavo Fontana) | (n/s) |
| (Daniel Casas) | (n/s) |

6

Paraguay

| Christian González | 4 |
| William Panadero | 5 |
| Daniel Ruíz | 6 |
| (Fernando Portillo) | (n/s) |
| (Fernando Orué) | (n/s) |
| (Carlos Ferreira) | (n/s) |

15

- Note: Athletes in parentheses did not score for the team result. (n/s: nonscorer)

=== Senior women's race (6 km) ===
Individual race
| Rank | Athlete | Country | Time |
|---|---|---|---|
| 1st place, gold medalist(s) | Stella Castro | Colombia | 21:43 |
| 2nd place, silver medalist(s) | Érika Olivera | Chile | 21:51 |
| 3rd place, bronze medalist(s) | Nadir Sabino de Siqueira | Brazil | 21:52 |
| 4 | Verónica Páez | Argentina | 22:13 |
| 5 | Luciene Soares de Deus | Brazil | 22:24 |
| 6 | Sebélia Maria de Vasconcelos | Brazil | 22:30 |
| 7 | Esneda Londoño | Colombia | 22:53 |
| 8 | María de los Ángeles Fernández | Argentina | 22:59 |
| 9 | Jorilda Sabino | Brazil | 23:14 |
| 10 | Zulma Ortiz | Argentina | 23:23 |
| 11 | Sandra Torres Álvarez | Argentina | 23:33 |
| 12 | Roxana Coronatti | Argentina | 24:05 |
| 13 | Mónica Pereira | Paraguay | 24:11 |
| 14 | Lilian López | Paraguay | 24:55 |
| 15 | Esmilsa Jiménez | Paraguay | 25:47 |
| 16 | Sandra Ponzo Gómez | Uruguay | 25:50 |
| 17 | Connie de Chang | Paraguay | 27:13 |
| 18 | Lourdes Cabrera | Paraguay | 27:41 |
| 19 | Eligia Cuevas | Paraguay | 27:57 |
| — | Carmen Cáceres | Uruguay | DNF |

Teams
| Rank | Team | Points |
|---|---|---|
| 1st place, gold medalist(s) | Brazil: Nadir Sabino de Siqueira / 1; Luciene Soares de Deus / 3; Sebélia Maria de Vasconcelos / 4; (Jorilda Sabino) / (n/s) | 8 |
| 2nd place, silver medalist(s) | Argentina: Verónica Páez / 2; María de los Ángeles Fernández / 5; Zulma Ortiz / 6; (Sandra Torres Álvarez) / (n/s); (Roxana Coronatti) / (n/s) | 13 |
| 3rd place, bronze medalist(s) | Paraguay: Mónica Pereira / 7; Lilian López / 8; Esmilsa Jiménez / 9; (Connie de Chang) / (n/s); (Lourdes Cabrera) / (n/s); (Eligia Cuevas) / (n/s) | 24 |

- Note: Athletes in parentheses did not score for the team result. (n/s: nonscorer)

=== Junior (U20) women's race (4 km) ===
Individual race
| Rank | Athlete | Country | Time |
|---|---|---|---|
| 1st place, gold medalist(s) | Bertha Sánchez | Colombia | 14:21 |
| 2nd place, silver medalist(s) | Fabiana Cristine da Silva | Brazil | 14:33 |
| 3rd place, bronze medalist(s) | Valquíria Silva Santos | Brazil | 14:56 |
| 4 | Ana Rondón | Colombia | 14:58 |
| 5 | María de los Ángeles Peralta | Argentina | 15:01 |
| 6 | Isabel Aparecida Boldo | Brazil | 15:09 |
| 7 | Mariela Davico | Argentina | 15:10 |
| 8 | Michelle Barreto Costa | Brazil | 15:19 |
| 9 | Virginia Quijada | Argentina | 15:22 |
| 10 | Gabriela Cevallos | Ecuador | 15:27 |
| 11 | Yolanda Fernández | Colombia | 15:29 |
| 12 | Susana Trinak | Argentina | 15:46 |
| 13 | Nancy Osorio | Ecuador | 16:09 |
| 14 | Sandra Cevallos | Ecuador | 16:19 |
| 15 | Analía Rivarola | Argentina | 16:36 |
| 16 | Shiela Yegros | Paraguay | 17:16 |
| 17 | Rocío Rodríguez | Paraguay | 18:49 |
| 18 | Miriam Rodríguez | Paraguay | 19:49 |
| 19 | Antonia Lombardo | Paraguay | 20:19 |

Teams
| Rank | Team | Points |
|---|---|---|
| 1st place, gold medalist(s) | Brazil: Fabiana Cristine da Silva / 2; Valquíria Silva Santos / 3; Isabel Aparecida Boldo / 6; (Michelle Barreto Costa) / (n/s) | 11 |
| 2nd place, silver medalist(s) | Colombia: Bertha Sánchez / 1; Ana Rondón / 4; Yolanda Fernández / 10 | 15 |
| 3rd place, bronze medalist(s) | Argentina: María de los Ángeles Peralta / 5; Mariela Davico / 7; Virginia Quijada / 8; (Susana Trinak) / (n/s); (Analía Rivarola) / (n/s) | 20 |
| 4 | Ecuador: Gabriela Cevallos / 9; Nancy Osorio / 11; Sandra Cevallos / 12 | 32 |
| 5 | Paraguay: Shiela Yegros / 13; Rocío Rodríguez / 14; Miriam Rodríguez / 15; (Antonia Lombardo) / (n/s) | 42 |

- Note: Athletes in parentheses did not score for the team result. (n/s: nonscorer)

=== Youth (U17) women's race (3 km) ===
Individual race
| Rank | Athlete | Country | Time |
|---|---|---|---|
| 1st place, gold medalist(s) | Vanesa Maraviglia | Argentina | 11:04 |
| 2nd place, silver medalist(s) | Vanesa Davico | Argentina | 11:22 |
| 3rd place, bronze medalist(s) | María Rodríguez | Uruguay | 11:42 |
| 4 | Nancy Gallo | Argentina | 11:50 |
| 5 | Laura Garciarena | Argentina | 11:59 |
| 6 | Natalia Domínguez | Argentina | 12:32 |
| 7 | Rocío Duarte | Paraguay | 13:11 |
| 8 | Sara González | Paraguay | 13:36 |
| 9 | Ilsa Giménez | Paraguay | 15:35 |
| — | Lorena Viñas | Argentina | DNF |

Teams
Rank
Team
Points

Argentina

| Vanesa Maraviglia | 1 |
| Vanesa Davico | 2 |
| Nancy Gallo | 3 |
| (Laura Garciarena) | (n/s) |
| (Natalia Domínguez) | (n/s) |
| (Lorena Viñas) | (DNF) |

6

Paraguay

| Rocío Duarte | 4 |
| Sara González | 5 |
| Ilsa Giménez | 6 |

15

- Note: Athletes in parentheses did not score for the team result. (n/s: nonscorer)

== Medal table (unofficial) ==
* Host nation (Paraguay)

| Rank | Nation | Gold | Silver | Bronze | Total |
|---|---|---|---|---|---|
| 1 | Brazil | 5 | 3 | 4 | 12 |
| 2 | Argentina | 4 | 4 | 3 | 11 |
| 3 | Colombia | 3 | 2 | 1 | 6 |
| 4 | Paraguay* | 0 | 2 | 1 | 3 |
| 5 | Chile | 0 | 1 | 0 | 1 |
| 6 | Uruguay | 0 | 0 | 1 | 1 |
| Totals (6 entries) | | 12 | 12 | 10 | 34 |

- Note: Totals include both individual and team medals, with medals in the team competition counting as one medal.

== Participation ==
According to an unofficial count, 108 athletes from 7 countries participated.

- Argentina (34)
- Brazil (17)
- Chile (1)
- Colombia (12)
- Ecuador (3)
- Paraguay (32)
- Uruguay (9)

== See also ==
- 1996 in athletics (track and field)
