= Javier Carriqueo =

Argentine runner (born 1979)

Personal information
- Full name: Javier Adolfo Carriqueo Inostroza
- Born: 29 May 1979 (age 47) San Martín de los Andes, Neuquén, Argentina
- Height: 1.75 m (5 ft 9 in)
- Weight: 61 kg (134 lb)

Sport
- Country: Argentina
- Sport: Athletics
- Event: Long-distance running
- Updated on 1 May 2014

Javier Adolfo Carriqueo Inostroza (born 29 May 1979 in San Martín de los Andes) is an Argentine middle and long-distance runner. At the 2012 Summer Olympics, he competed in the Men's 5000 metres, finishing 36th overall in Round 1, failing to qualify for the final.

== Personal bests ==
- 800 m: 1:45.32 – (Spain) Getafe, 10 July 2003
- 1500 m: 3:38.62 – (Brazil) Rio de Janeiro, 25 July 2007
- 3000 m: 7:49.54 – (Spain) Mataró, 4 August 2009
- 5000 m: 13:25.17 – (Spain) Barcelona, 22 July 2011
- 10,000 m: 29:06.04 – (Argentina) Buenos Aires, 5 June 2011

== Competition record ==
| Year | Competition | Venue | Position | Event | Notes |
Representing Argentina
| 1997 | South American Cross Country Championships – Junior | Comodoro Rivadavia, Argentina | 8th | 8 km | 27:15 |
| 1997 | South American Cross Country Championships – Junior | Comodoro Rivadavia, Argentina | 2nd | Team - 8 km | 23 pts |
| 1997 | South American Junior Championships | San Carlos, Uruguay | 6th | 5000 m | 14:59.33 |
| 1998 | South American Cross Country Championships – Junior | Artur Nogueira, Brazil | 5th | 8 km | 26:42 |
| 1998 | South American Junior Championships | Córdoba, Argentina | 4th | 5000 m | 14:49.37 |
| 1998 | South American Junior Championships | Córdoba, Argentina | 1st | 10,000 m | 31:06.83 |
| 1998 | World Junior Championships | Annecy, France | 13th | 10,000 m | 31:12.63 |
| 1999 | South American Cross Country Championships | Artur Nogueira, Brazil | 5th | 4 km | 12:35 |
| 1999 | South American Cross Country Championships | Artur Nogueira, Brazil | 2nd | Team - 4 km | 21 pts |
| 1999 | World Cross Country Championships | Belfast, United Kingdom | 71st | 4.236 km (Short race) | 13:42 |
| 2000 | Ibero-American Championships | Rio de Janeiro, Brazil | 3rd | 1500 m | 3:44.93 |
| 2001 | South American Cross Country Championships | Rio de Janeiro, Brazil | 2nd | 4 km (Short race) | 11:34 |
| 2001 | South American Cross Country Championships | Rio de Janeiro, Brazil | 1st | Team - 4 km (Short race) | 14 pts |
| 2001 | World Cross Country Championships | Ostend, Belgium | 43rd | 4.1 km (Short race) | 13:32 |
| 2001 | World Cross Country Championships | Ostend, Belgium | — | 12.3 km (Long race) | DNF |
| 2002 | South American Cross Country Championships | Rio de Janeiro, Brazil | 2nd | 4 km (Short race) | 12:11 |
| 2002 | South American Cross Country Championships | Rio de Janeiro, Brazil | 2nd | Team - 4 km (Short race) | 15 pts |
| 2002 | World Cross Country Championships | Dublin, Ireland | 43rd | 4.208 km (Short race) | 12:54 |
| 2002 | Ibero-American Championships | Guatemala City, Guatemala | 3rd | 1500 m | 3:48.73 |
| 2003 | World Cross Country Championships | Lausanne, Switzerland | 55th | 4.03 km (Short race) | 12:01 |
| 2003 | South American Road Mile Championships | Belém, Brazil | 4th | One mile | 4:16 |
| 2003 | South American Championships | Barquisimeto, Venezuela | 10th (h) | 800 m | 1:51.98 |
| 2003 | South American Championships | Barquisimeto, Venezuela | 3rd | 1500 m | 3:42.65 |
| 2003 | Pan American Games | Santo Domingo, Dominican Republic | 7th | 1500 m | 3:50.95 |
| 2004 | Ibero-American Championships | Huelva, Spain | 5th | 1500 m | 3:42.01 |
| 2005 | World Cross Country Championships | Saint-Galmier, France | 84th | 4.196 km (Short race) | 12:50 |
| 2005 | South American Championships | Cali, Colombia | 3rd | 1500 m | 3:45.53 |
| 2005 | South American Championships | Cali, Colombia | 3rd | 5000 m | 14:19.10 |
| 2006 | Ibero-American Championships | Ponce, Puerto Rico | 7th | 1500 m | 3:48.77 |
| 2006 | Ibero-American Championships | Ponce, Puerto Rico | 2nd | 3000 m | 8:09.20 |
| 2007 | South American Championships | São Paulo, Brazil | 2nd | 5000 m | 13:55.37 |
| 2007 | Pan American Games | Rio de Janeiro, Brazil | 4th | 1500 m | 3:38.62 |
| 2007 | Pan American Games | Rio de Janeiro, Brazil | 5th | 5000 m | 13:52.36 |
| 2007 | World Championships | Osaka, Japan | 26th (h) | 1500 m | 3:42.20 |
| 2008 | World Indoor Championships | Valencia, Spain | 19th (h) | 3000 m | 8:12.40 |
| 2008 | Ibero-American Championships | Iquique, Chile | 1st | 5000 m | 13:51.14 |
| 2008 | Olympic Games | Beijing, China | 22nd (h) | 1500 m | 3:39.36 |
| 2009 | World Cross Country Championships | Amman, Jordan | 49th | 12 km | 37:20 |
| 2010 | World Cross Country Championships | Bydgoszcz, Poland | — | 11.611 km | DNF |
| 2010 | Ibero-American Championships | San Fernando, Spain | 7th | 5000 m | 14:03.77 |
| 2011 | World Cross Country Championships | Punta Umbría, Spain | 96th | 12 km | 38:29 |
| 2011 | South American Championships | Buenos Aires, Argentina | 1st | 5000 m | 13:58.27 |
| 2011 | South American Championships | Buenos Aires, Argentina | 5th | 10,000 m | 29:06.04 |
| 2011 | World Championships | Daegu, South Korea | 18th (h) | 5000 m | 13:47.51 |
| 2011 | Pan American Games | Guadalajara, Mexico | 6th | 1500 m | 3:55.52 |
| 2012 | Ibero-American Championships | Barquisimeto, Venezuela | 2nd | 5000 m | 14:22.12 |
| 2012 | Olympic Games | London, United Kingdom | 36th (h) | 5000 m | 13:57.07 |
| 2013 | South American Championships | Cartagena, Colombia | 5th | 5000 m | 14:28.00 |
| 2014 | South American Games | Santiago, Chile | 3rd | 5000 m | 14:11.41 |
| 2014 | South American Games | Santiago, Chile | – | 10,000 m | DNF |
| 2014 | Ibero-American Championships | São Paulo, Brazil | 6th | 3000 m | 8:07.31 |
| 2014 | Ibero-American Championships | São Paulo, Brazil | – | 5000 m | DNF |
| 2015 | South American Championships | Lima, Peru | 5th | 1500m | 3:46.31 |
| 2015 | South American Championships | Lima, Peru | — | 5000m | DNF |
| 2018 | South American Games | Cochabamba, Bolivia | – | 5000 m | DNF |
| 2018 | South American Games | Cochabamba, Bolivia | 6th | 10,000 m | 32.26.63 |
