= María Peralta =

Argentine runner (born 1977)

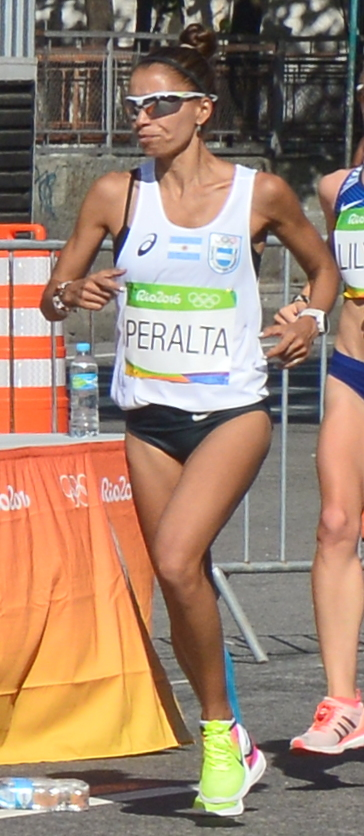
- Peralta at the 2016 Olympics

Personal information
- Full name: María de los Angeles Peralta
- Born: 30 November 1977 (age 48) Mar del Plata, Buenos Aires Province, Argentina
- Height: 1.67 m (5 ft 6 in)
- Weight: 49 kg (108 lb)

Sport
- Country: Argentina
- Sport: Athletics
- Event: Long-distance running
- Coached by: Leonardo Malgor; Daniel Diaz (national); Leonardo Malgor (personal)
- Updated on 8 May 2014

María de los Ángeles Peralta (born 30 November 1977) is an Argentine middle and long-distance runner. She competed in the marathon at the 2012 Summer Olympics, placing 82nd with a time of 2:40:50. She did not finish her 2016 Olympic marathon.

== Personal life ==
Peralta is married to Andres and has two daughters Maia and Ainhoa. She took up running in 1986 and mostly trained in middle distances. She ran her first marathon in 2011.

== Personal bests ==
- 800 m: 2:16.77 – Santa Fe, Argentina, 29 April 2006
- 1500 m: 4:23.20– Santa Fe, Argentina, 16 April 2005
- 3000 m: 9:20.53 – Buenos Aires, Argentina, 8 February 2014
- 5000 m: 16:13.43 – Buenos Aires, Argentina, 25 January 2014
- 10,000 m: 33:57.44 – Buenos Aires, Argentina, 26 January 2014
- Half marathon: 1:15:21 – Cardiff, United Kingdom, 26 March 2016
- Marathon: 2:37:57 – Rotterdam, Netherlands, 15 April 2012
- 3000 m steeplechase: 10:33.71 – Rosario, Argentina, 1 June 2003

== Achievements ==
Year	Competition	Venue	Position	Event	Notes
Representing Argentina
1992	South American Youth Championships	Santiago, Chile	6th	1500 m	4:51.83
1994	South American Junior Championships	Santa Fe, Argentina	4th	1500 m	4:43.4
1995	South American Junior Championships	Santiago, Chile	6th	1500 m	4:46.5
1995	South American Junior Championships	Santiago, Chile	6th	3000 m	10:40.16
1995	Pan American Junior Championships	Santiago, Chile	8th	3000 m	10:46.25
1996	South American Cross Country Championships – Junior	Asunción, Paraguay	5th	4 km	15:01
1996	South American Junior Championships	Bucaramanga, Colombia	3rd	1500 m	4:40.3
1996	South American Junior Championships	Bucaramanga, Colombia	3rd	3000 m	10:18.2
1997	South American Cross Country Championships	Comodoro Rivadavia, Argentina	12th	6 km	22:58
1998	South American Cross Country Championships	Artur Nogueira, Brazil	15th	4 km	15:40
2000	Ibero-American Championships	Rio de Janeiro, Brazil	7th	800 m	2:15.50
2000	Ibero-American Championships	Rio de Janeiro, Brazil	7th	1500 m	4:28.89
2001	South American Championships	Manaus, Brazil	–	3000 m s'chase	DNF
2002	Ibero-American Championships	Guatemala City, Guatemala	4th	3000 m s'chase	11:40.3
2003	South American Cross Country Championships	Asunción, Paraguay	6th	4 km	15:08
2003	South American Championships	Barquisimeto, Venezuela	5th	3000 m s'chase	11:16.83
2004	South American Cross Country Championships	Macaé, Brazil	6th	4 km	13:49
2004	South American Cross Country Championships	Macaé, Brazil	—	8 km	DNF
2005	South American Cross Country Championships	Montevideo, Uruguay	6th	4 km	14:36
2005	World Cross Country Championships	Saint-Galmier, France	93rd	4.196 km	15:23
2005	South American Championships	Cali, Colombia	2nd	1500 m	4:30.37
2005	South American Championships	Cali, Colombia	5th	3000 m s'chase	10:58.69
2006	South American Cross Country Championships	Mar del Plata, Argentina	7th	4 km	13:53
2006	World Cross Country Championships	Fukuoka, Japan	80th	4 km	14:46
2009	South American Championships	Lima, Peru	8th	5000 m	17:21.06
2011	South American Half Marathon Championships	Buenos Aires, Argentina	8th	Half marathon	1:17:08
2012	Olympic Games	London, United Kingdom	81st	Marathon	2:40:50
2013	World Championships	Moscow, Russia	—	Marathon	DNF
2014	South American Games	Santiago, Chile	3rd	5000 m	16:15.01
2014	South American Games	Santiago, Chile	5th	10,000 m	34:15.26
