= Ramón Aranda =

Paraguayan long-distance runner

Ramón Aranda (born 23 June 1966) is a Paraguayan former long-distance runner who competed in cross country running and the 10,000 metres. He was a multiple national champion in past decades under the Federación Paraguaya de Atletismo. Aranda is from the department of Alto Paraná and tied to the track and field club Asociación de Atletismo del Alto Paraná. Represented Paraguay at the 1996 South American Cross Country Championships. 1998 South American Cross Country Championships, 1999 South American Cross Country Championships and the 2001 South American Cross Country Championships.

== International competitions ==
| Year | Competition | Venue | Position | Event | Notes |
Representing Paraguay
| 1996 | South American Cross Country Championships | Asunción, Paraguay | 21st | 12 km | 48:06 |
| 1998 | South American Cross Country Championships | Artur Nogueira, Brazil | 17th | 12 km | 43:48 |
| 1999 | South American Cross Country Championships | Artur Nogueira, Brazil | 13th | 12 km | 44:22 |
| 2001 | South American Cross Country Championships | Rio de Janeiro, Brazil | 30th | 12 km | 42:22 |
