= Adriana da Silva =

Brazilian long-distance runner

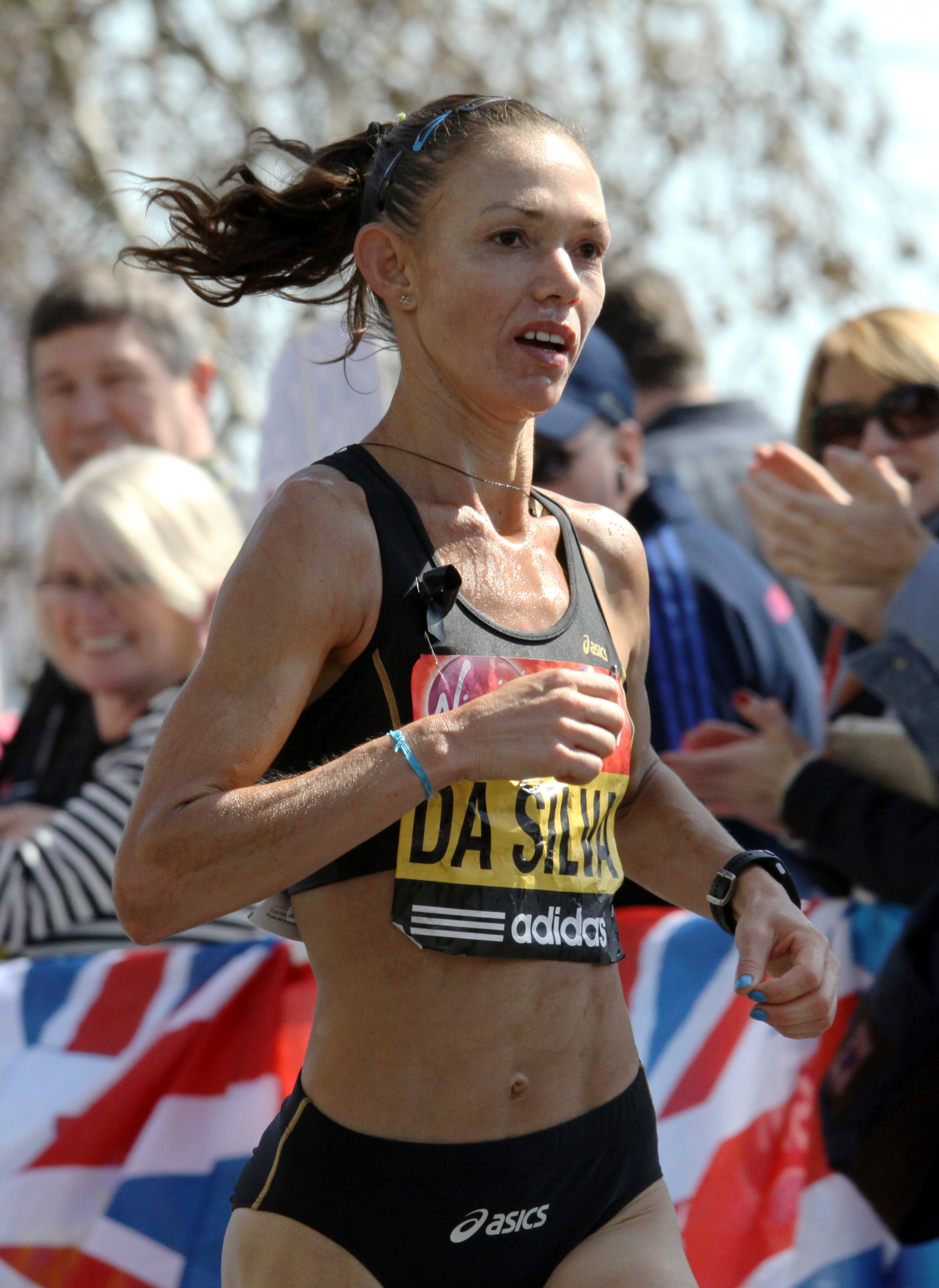
- Da Silva in the 2013 London Marathon

Personal information
- Full name: Adriana Aparecida da Silva
- Born: 22 July 1981 (age 44) Cruzeiro, São Paulo, Brazil
- Height: 1.68 m (5 ft 6 in)
- Weight: 50 kg (110 lb)

Sport
- Country: Brazil
- Sport: Athletics
- Event: Marathon
Medal record
Women's Athletics
Representing Brazil
Pan American Games
Gold medal – first place	2011 Guadalajara	Marathon
Gold medal – first place	2015 Toronto	Marathon
South American Youth Championships
Gold medal – first place	1996 Asunción	4x400 m relay
- Updated on 12 May 2014

Adriana Aparecida da Silva (born 22 July 1981) is a Brazilian long-distance runner who competes in half marathons and marathons. She has represented her country at World Championship-level both on the roads and in cross country. She won two gold medals in the marathon at the 2011 Pan American Games in Guadalajara, Mexico, and 2015 Pan American Games in Toronto, Canada.

She is a member of Esporte Clube Pinheiros.

== Career ==
Adriana da Silva was born in Cruzeiro, São Paulo, and started her career as a cross country runner. She represented Brazil in the junior races at the IAAF World Cross Country Championships in 1998 and 2000. Following a national title win in the half marathon, she made her first senior appearance on the world stage at the 2004 IAAF World Half Marathon Championships, coming in 39th place.

After a break in her athletics career, da Silva returned to action in 2008 and ran for Brazil at the 2010 IAAF World Cross Country Championships, ending the race in 82nd place. She made her marathon debut at the Santa Catarina Marathon in Florianópolis and won on her first attempt, recording a time of 2:41:30 hours. She was selected for the Brazilian squad at the 2009 World Championships in Athletics as a result and improved her best to 2:40:54 hours to finish 43rd in the Berlin race. In 2010, she came third at the São Paulo Marathon, just two seconds outside of her personal best time. She won the Río de Janeiro Half Marathon in July and went on to have her highest global placing at the 2010 IAAF World Half Marathon Championships in Nanning, where she was 25th in the rankings. The 2010 Berlin Marathon in September saw her significantly improve her best with a finishing time of 2:32:30 hours for seventh place.

In 2011, she ran at the Vienna City Marathon and was sixth with a time of 2:33:48 hours. Later that year, she won the South American title in the half marathon. The 2011 Pan American Games saw her ascend to the peak of the regional scene as she won the marathon gold medal in a Games record time of 2:36:37 hours, in spite of Guadalajara's high altitude. She set a personal best of 2:29:17 hours at the 2012 Tokyo Marathon, finishing ninth overall. She competed at the 2012 Summer Olympics, finishing 47th in a time of 2:33:15.

In 2015, she was the gold medalist in the marathon at the Pan American Games in Toronto, Canada after the Peruvian athletic Gladys Tejeda lost her gold medal. She also broke the Games record with a time of 2:35:40 hours.

== Personal bests ==
- 5000 m: 16:12.88 – São Paulo, Brazil, 8 June 2013
- 10,000 m: 33:21.59 – São Paulo, Brazil, 6 June 2013
- Half marathon: 1:13:16 – Buenos Aires, Argentina, 11 September 2011
- Marathon: 2:29:17 – Tokyo, Japan, 26 February 2012

== Achievements ==
Year	Competition	Venue	Position	Event	Notes
Representing Brazil
1996	South American Youth Championships	Asunción, Paraguay	4th	300 m hurdles	44.43 s
1996	South American Youth Championships	Asunción, Paraguay	1st	4 × 400 m relay	3:49.67 min
1998	South American Cross Country Championships - Junior	Artur Nogueira, Brazil	7th	6 km	24:37
1998	World Cross Country Championships – Junior	Marrakesh, Morocco	108th	6 km	25:16
1998	Saint Silvester Road Race	São Paulo, Brazil	32nd	15 km	1:01:26
1999	South American Cross Country Championships - Junior	Artur Nogueira, Brazil	6th	6 km	24:26
1999	South American Junior Championships	Concepción, Chile	4th	5000 m	17:41.82
2000	South American Cross Country Championships - Junior	Cartagena, Colombia	4th	6 km	23:11
2000	World Cross Country Championships - Junior	Vilamoura, Portugal	115th	6.29 km	25:37
2001	South American Cross Country Championships	Rio de Janeiro, Brazil	11th	8 km	30:19
2004	World Half Marathon Championships	New Delhi, India	39th	Half marathon	1:19:49
2009	South American Cross Country Championships	Concepción, Chile	9th	8 km	29:26
2009	World Cross Country Championships	Amman, Jordan	82nd	8 km	31:40
2009	Lusophony Games	Lisbon, Portugal	3rd	10 km (road)	35:36
2009	World Championships	Berlin, Germany	42nd	Marathon	2:40:54
2010	World Half Marathon Championships	Nanning, China	25th	Half marathon	1:14:24
2010	Berlin Marathon	Berlin, Germany	7th	Marathon	2:32:30
2011	South American Cross Country Championships	Asunción, Paraguay	6th	8 km	28:17.8
2011	South American Half Marathon Championships	Buenos Aires, Argentina	1st	Half marathon	1:13:16
2011	Pan American Games	Guadalajara, Mexico	1st	Marathon	2:36:37
2012	Olympic Games	London, United Kingdom	47th	Marathon	2:33:15
2012	South American Half Marathon Championships	Asunción, Paraguay	1st	Half marathon	1:17:50
2013	South American Championships	Cartagena, Colombia	8th	10,000 m	36:19.37
2014	South American Games	Santiago, Chile	7th	5000 m	17:20.94
2014	South American Games	Santiago, Chile	8th	10,000 m	36:19.37
2015	Pan American Games	Toronto, Canada	1st	Marathon	2:35:40
