= Marílson Gomes dos Santos =

Brazilian long-distance runner

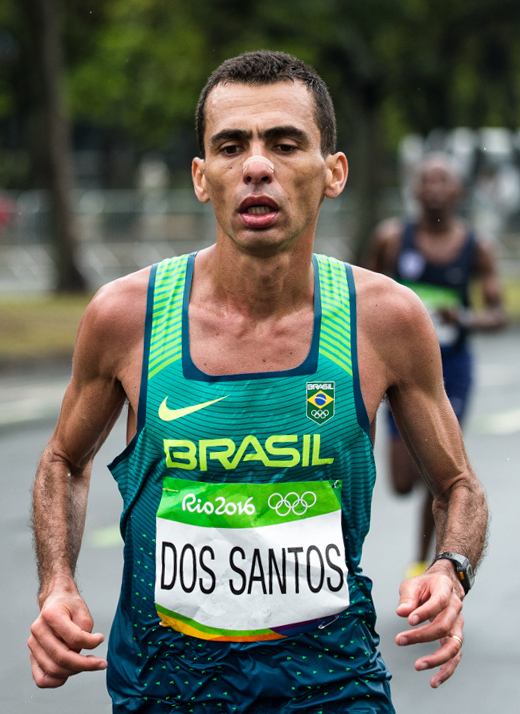
- Dos Santos at the 2016 Olympics

Personal information
- Born: 6 August 1977 (age 49) Brasília, Brazil
- Height: 174 cm (5 ft 9 in)
- Weight: 58 kg (128 lb)

Sport
- Country: Brazil
- Sport: Athletics
- Events: 5000 m, 10,000, half marathon, marathon
- Club: BM&F Bovespa
- Coached by: Adauto Domingues

Achievements and titles
- Personal bests: 5000 m – 13:19.43 (2006); 10,000 m – 27:28.12 (2007); Half Marathon – 59:33 (2007); Marathon – 2:06:34 (2011)
Medal record
Pan American Games
Gold medal – first place	2011 Guadalajara	10,000 metres
Silver medal – second place	2003 Santo Domingo	10,000 metres
Silver medal – second place	2007 Rio de Janeiro	10,000 metres
Bronze medal – third place	2003 Santo Domingo	5000 metres
Bronze medal – third place	2007 Rio de Janeiro	5000 metres
Universiade
Gold medal – first place	1997 Sicily	Half marathon
Gold medal – first place	1999 Palma	Half marathon
- Updated on 14 June 2014

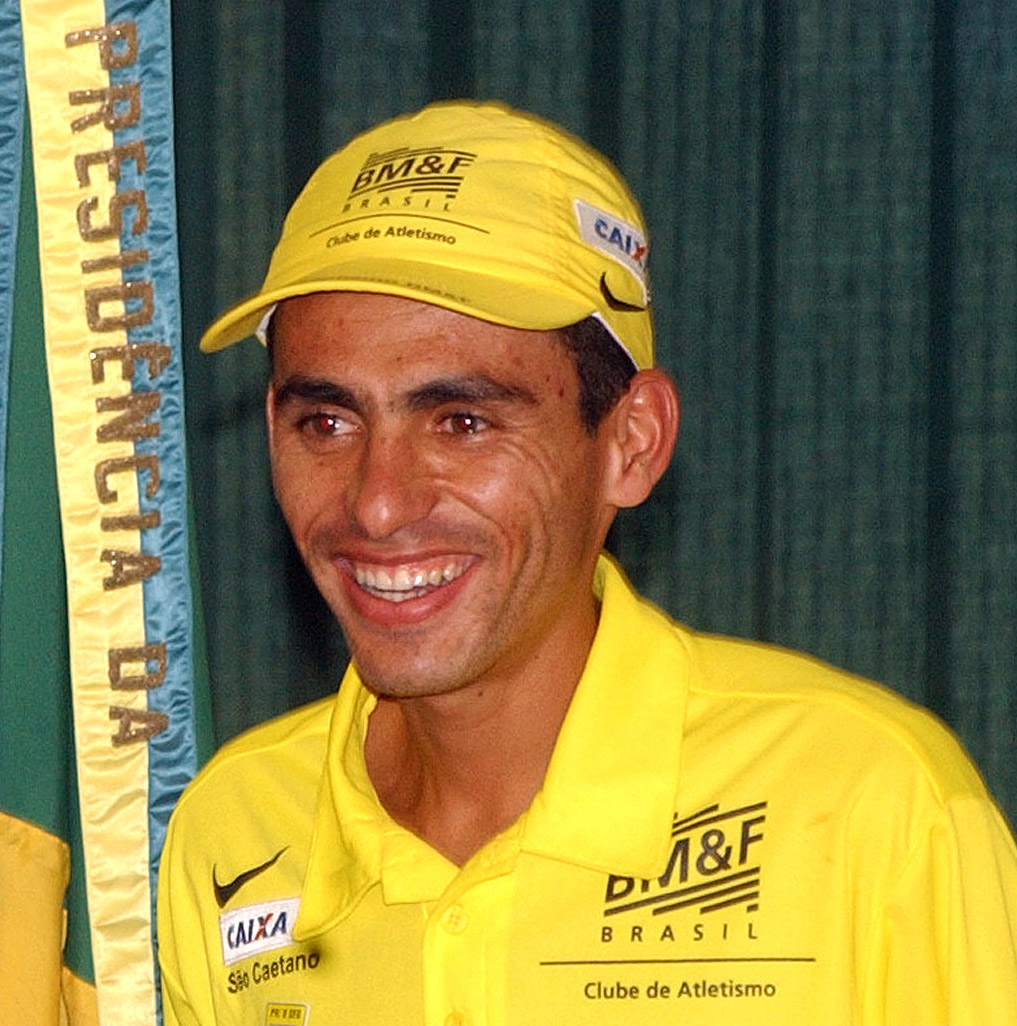
Dos Santos in 2006

Marílson Gomes dos Santos (born 6 August 1977) is a Brazilian long-distance runner.

== Career ==
Gomes dos Santos won the 2006 and 2008 New York City Marathon, becoming the first South American to win the race. He was selected as the best male performer at the 2009 Brazilian national championships after breaking the meet records in both the 5000 metres and 10,000 metres races. He is the current South American record holder in both these events with times of 13:19.43 and 27:28.12, respectively.

He has won medals at the South American Cross Country Championships, starting with a silver in the junior race in 1996, then taking the bronze in the men's long race in 2000, before winning his first championship title in 2008.

He ran at the 2010 London Marathon and came close to a personal best time, finishing in 2:08:46 for sixth place behind Abel Kirui. He signed up for the New York Marathon that year and used the Troféu Brasil de Atletismo (the Brazilian athletics championships) as his preparation, winning the 10,000 m title. He secured his third career win at the Saint Silvester Race in São Paulo at the end of the year – a record number for a Brazilian runner since the opening of the run for international participant (since 1945).

At the 2011 London Marathon, he set a personal best of 2:06:34 hours and placed fourth in the fast race behind a Kenyan trio of Emmanuel Mutai, Martin Lel and Patrick Makau.

Gomes dos Santos competed in the marathon at the 2008, 2012 Summer Olympics and 2016 Olympics with the best result of fifth place in 2012. He is married to Juliana Paula dos Santos, a fellow runner who won gold medals at the 2007 and 2015 Pan American Games. They have a son Miguel, who is also a runner and ran a U-16 national record in the 1000m (2:28) at the Campeonatos Brasileiros Interclubes CBI® de Atletismo Loterias Caixa!

== Competition record ==
Year	Competition	Venue	Position	Event	Notes
Representing the Brazil
1995	South American Cross Country Championships (U20)	Cali, Colombia	5th	8 km	23:55
1995	World Cross Country Championships (U20)	Durham, United Kingdom	88th	8.47 km	27:06
1995	Pan American Athletics Championships	Santiago, Chile	5th	5000 m	14:45.87
1995	South American Junior Championships	Santiago, Chile	2nd	5000 m	14:36.88
1996	South American Cross Country Championships – (U20)	Asunción, Paraguay	2nd	8 km	26:09
1996	World Cross Country Championships (U20)	Stellenbosch, South Africa	22nd	8.35 km	26:21
1996	South American Junior Championships	Bucaramanga, Colombia	2nd	5000 m	14:48.3
1996	World Junior Championships	Sydney, Australia	21st (h)	5000m	14:30.99
1997	Universiade	Catania, Italy	1st	Half marathon	1:03:32
1999	South American Cross Country Championships	Artur Nogueira, Brazil	4th	12 km	39:24
1999	World Cross Country Championships	Belfast, United Kingdom	84th	12 km	43:28
1999	Universiade	Palma, Spain	1st	Half marathon	1:04:05
2000	South American Cross Country Championships	Cartagena, Colombia	3rd	12 km	37:59
2000	Ibero-American Championships	Rio de Janeiro, Brazil	2nd	10,000 m	28:58.74
2002	Saint Silvester Road Race	São Paulo, Brazil	2nd	15 km	45:06
2003	South American Championships	Barquisimeto, Venezuela	1st	5000 m	13:52.15
2003	Pan American Games	Santo Domingo, Dominican Republic	3rd	5000 m	13:56.90
2003	Pan American Games	Santo Domingo, Dominican Republic	2nd	10,000 m	28:49.48
2003	Saint Silvester Road Race	São Paulo, Brazil	1st	15 km	43:49
2005	World Championships	Helsinki, Finland	6th	Marathon	2:13:40
2005	Saint Silvester Road Race	São Paulo, Brazil	1st	15 km	44:19
2006	Ibero-American Championships	Ponce, Puerto Rico	1st	5000 m	13:42.88
2006	World Cup	Athens, Greece	5th	5000 m	13:47.15
2006	New York City Marathon	New York City, United States	1st	Marathon	2:09:58
2007	Pan American Games	Rio de Janeiro, Brazil	3rd	5000 m	13:30.68
2007	Pan American Games	Rio de Janeiro, Brazil	2nd	10,000 m	28:09.30
2007	World Road Running Championships	Udine, Italy	7th	Half marathon	59:33
2008	South American Cross Country Championships	Asunción, Paraguay	1st	12.0 km	37:28
2008	World Cross Country Championships	Edinburgh, United Kingdom	53rd	12 km	37:17
2008	Olympic Games	Beijing, China	—	Marathon	DNF
2008	World Half Marathon Championships	Rio de Janeiro, Brazil	8th	Half marathon	1:03:18
2008	South American Half Marathon Championships	Rio de Janeiro, Brazil	1st	Half marathon	1:03:18
2008	New York City Marathon	New York City, United States	1st	Marathon	2:08:43
2009	World Championships	Berlin, Germany	16th	Marathon	2:15:13
2009	World Half Marathon Championships	Birmingham, United Kingdom	17th	Half marathon	1:02:41
2010	London Marathon	London, United Kingdom	6th	Marathon	2:08:46
2010	Ibero-American Championships	San Fernando, Spain	2nd	5000 m	13:34.92
2010	New York City Marathon	New York City, United States	7th	Marathon	2:11:51
2010	Saint Silvester Road Race	São Paulo, Brazil	1st	15 km	44:07
2011	London Marathon	London, United Kingdom	4th	Marathon	2:06:34
2011	South American Half Marathon Championships	Buenos Aires, Argentina	1st	Half marathon	1:01:13
2011	Pan American Games	Guadalajara, Mexico	1st	10,000 m	29:00.64
2012	London Marathon	London, United Kingdom	8th	Marathon	2:08:03
2012	Olympic Games	London, United Kingdom	5th	Marathon	2:11:10
2013	Berlin Marathon	Berlin, Germany	6th	Marathon	2:09:24
