= Oscar Cortínez =

Argentine long-distance runner (born 1973)

Personal information
- Full name: Hernán Oscar Cortínez
- Nickname: Indio
- Born: August 4, 1973 (age 52) Morón, Buenos Aires, Argentina
- Height: 1.80 m (5 ft 11 in)
- Weight: 70 kg (154 lb)

Sport
- Country: Argentina
- Sport: Athletics
- Event: Distance running
- Retired: 23 November 2012
- Updated on 13 June 2014

Hernán Oscar Cortínez (born August 4, 1973 in Morón) is a male marathon runner from Argentina, who is a two-time winner of the Buenos Aires Marathon in his native country (2003 and 2004). He represented Argentina in the men's marathon at the 2000 Summer Olympics in Sydney, Australia.

He won the gold medal in the short race at the 2001 South American Cross Country Championships.

He retired in 2012.

== Personal bests ==
- 3000 m: 8:12.00 min – (Argentina) Santa Fe, 4 December 2001
- 5000 m: 14:18.7 min – (Argentina) Buenos Aires, 28 March 1999
- 10,000 m: 29:31.80 min – (South Korea) Seoul, 18 September 1992
- Half marathon: 1:04:58 hrs – (Japan) Osaka, 28 February 1999
- Marathon: 2:13:42 hrs – (Argentina) Santa Rosa, 23 April 2000

== Achievements ==
Year	Competition	Venue	Position	Event	Notes
Representing Argentina
1991	South American Junior Championships	Asunción, Paraguay	3rd	1500 m	4:00.7
1991	South American Junior Championships	Asunción, Paraguay	4th	5000 m	15:32.9
1992	World Junior Championships	Seoul, South Korea	5th	10,000 m	29:31.80
1993	South American Cross Country Championships	Cali, Colombia	—	12 km	
1993	World Cross Country Championships	Amorebieta, Spain	166th	11.75 km	36:24
1996	South American Cross Country Championships	Asunción, Paraguay	12th	12 km	40:20
2000	Olympic Games	Sydney, Australia	58th	Marathon	2:25:01
2001	South American Cross Country Championships	Rio de Janeiro, Brazil	1st	4 km	11:25
2001	World Cross Country Championships	Ostend, Belgium	47th	4.1 km	13:35
2001	World Cross Country Championships	Ostend, Belgium	—	12.3 km	DNF
2002	South American Half Marathon Championships	Buenos Aires, Argentina	1st	Half marathon	1:05:40
2002	World Cross Country Championships	Dublin, Ireland	101st	4.208 km	13:37
2002	World Cross Country Championships	Dublin, Ireland	109th	11.998 km	39:03
2003	Buenos Aires Marathon	Buenos Aires, Argentina	1st	Marathon	2:17:50
2004	Buenos Aires Marathon	Buenos Aires, Argentina	1st	Marathon	2:21:22
2009	South American Marathon Championships	Buenos Aires, Argentina	2nd	Marathon	2:20:06
