= Hudson de Souza =

Brazilian middle distance runner (born 1977)

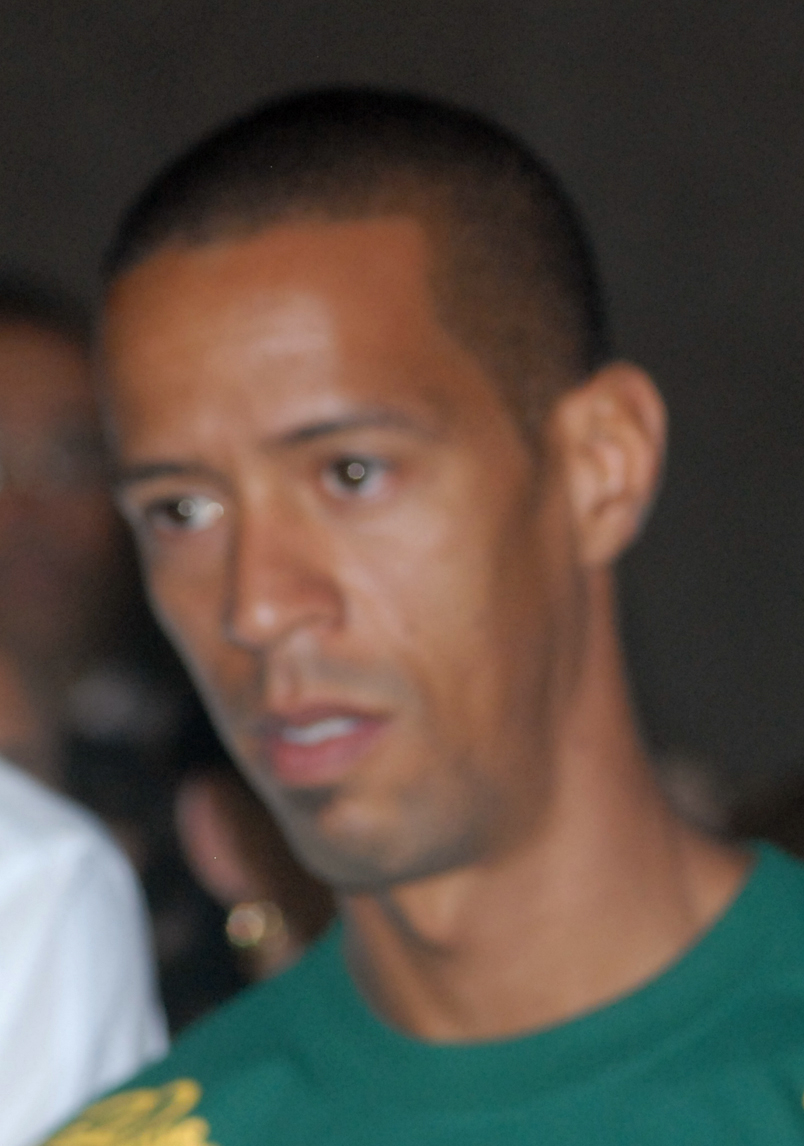

Personal information
- Full name: Hudson Santos de Souza
- Born: February 25, 1977 (age 49) Sobradinho, Federal District, Brazil
- Height: 1.80 m (5 ft 11 in)
- Weight: 67 kg (148 lb)

Sport
- Country: Brazil
- Sport: Athletics
- Event: Middle-distance running
Medal record
Men's Athletics
Representing Brazil
Pan American Games
Gold medal – first place	2003 Santo Domingo	1500 metres
Gold medal – first place	2003 Santo Domingo	5000 metres
Gold medal – first place	2007 Rio de Janeiro	1500 metres
Silver medal – second place	2011 Guadalajara	3000 m st.
Bronze medal – third place	1999 Winnipeg	1500 metres
- Updated on 31 January 2015

Hudson Santos de Souza (born February 25, 1977) is a retired Brazilian middle-distance runner who mostly competed over 1500 metres. He broke a number of South American records in middle-distance events.

He won twice at the South American Cross Country Championships, with gold medals in the short race in 2002 and 2006. He also won the junior bronze medal in 1996.

== Competition record ==
Year	Competition	Venue	Position	Event	Notes
Representing Brazil
1995	Pan American Junior Championships	Santiago, Chile	4th	1500m	3:49.93
1995	South American Junior Championships	Santiago, Chile	2nd	1500 m	3:53.28
1996	South American Cross Country Championships (U20)	Asunción, Paraguay	3rd	8 km	26:20
1996	South American Cross Country Championships (U20)	Asunción, Paraguay	1st	Team - 8 km	6 pts
1996	World Cross Country Championships (U20)	Stellenbosch, South Africa	63rd	8.35 km	27:20
1996	South American Junior Championships	Bucaramanga, Colombia	1st	800 m	1:50.8
1996	World Junior Championships	Sydney, Australia	10th	1500 m	3:45.22
1998	Ibero-American Championships	Lisbon, Portugal	3rd	1500 m	3:41.14
1999	South American Championships	Bogotá, Colombia	1st	800 m	1:49.82
1999	Pan American Games	Winnipeg, Canada	3rd	1500 m	3:42.18
2000	Ibero-American Championships	Rio de Janeiro, Brazil	1st	800 m	1:47.18
2000	Ibero-American Championships	Rio de Janeiro, Brazil	1st	1500 m	3:42.21
2000	Olympic Games	Sydney, Australia	17th (sf)	1500 m	3:41.00
2001	World Indoor Championships	Lisbon, Portugal	13th (h)	1500 m	3:43.14
2001	South American Road Mile Championships	Rio de Janeiro, Brazil	1st	One mile	4:06
2001	South American Championships	Manaus, Brazil	1st	800 m	1:47.20
2001	South American Championships	Manaus, Brazil	1st	1500 m	3:36.47
2001	World Championships	Edmonton, Canada	8th (sf)	1500 m	3:37.13
2002	South American Cross Country Championships	Santa Cruz de la Sierra, Bolivia	1st	4 km	11:57
2002	World Cross Country Championships	Dublin, Ireland	50th	4.208 km	12:58
2002	South American Road Mile Championships	Belém, Brazil	1st	One mile	4:01
2002	Ibero-American Championships	Guatemala City, Guatemala	1st	800 m	1:46.74
2002	Ibero-American Championships	Guatemala City, Guatemala	1st	1500 m	3:45.46
2002	IAAF World Cup	Madrid, Spain	8th	1500m	3:42.58
2003	South American Road Mile Championships	Belém, Brazil	1st	One mile	4:11
2003	Pan American Games	Santo Domingo, Dominican Republic	1st	1500 m	3:45.72
2003	Pan American Games	Santo Domingo, Dominican Republic	1st	5000 m	13:50.71
2003	World Championships	Paris, France	14th (sf)	1500 m	3:41.12
2004	World Indoor Championships	Budapest, Hungary	12th (h)	1500 m	3:43.24
2004	Ibero-American Championships	Huelva, Spain	2nd	1500 m	3:37.66
2004	Ibero-American Championships	Huelva, Spain	1st	3000 m	7:51.25
2004	Olympic Games	Athens, Greece	9th (sf)	1500 m	3:38.83
2005	South American Road Mile Championships	Belém, Brazil	1st	One mile	4:05
2005	World Championships	Helsinki, Finland	31st (h)	1500 m	3:43.18
2006	South American Cross Country Championships	Mar del Plata, Argentina	1st	4 km	11:24
2006	South American Cross Country Championships	Mar del Plata, Argentina	2nd	Team - 4 km	14 pts
2006	World Cross Country Championships	Fukuoka, Japan	79th	4 km	11:52
2006	South American Road Mile Championships	Belém, Brazil	2nd	One mile	3:56
2006	Ibero-American Championships	Ponce, Puerto Rico	4th	1500 m	3:47.82
2006	Ibero-American Championships	Ponce, Puerto Rico	1st	3000 m	8:08.62
2006	South American Championships	Tunja, Colombia	2nd	800 m	1:49.97
2006	South American Championships	Tunja, Colombia	1st	1500 m	3:46.98
2007	Pan American Games	Rio de Janeiro, Brazil	1st	1500 m	3:36.32
2007	World Championships	Osaka, Japan	30th (h)	1500 m	3:43.37
2008	South American Road Mile Championships	Belém, Brazil	1st	One mile	4:03
2008	Olympic Games	Beijing, China	19th (h)	1500 m	3:37.06
2009	South American Road Mile Championships	Belém, Brazil	2nd	One mile	3:58
2009	South American Championships	Lima, Peru	2nd	1500 m	3:42.72
2009	Lusophony Games	Lisbon, Portugal	3rd	1500 m	3:49.26
2010	South American Road Mile Championships	Belém, Brazil	4th	One mile	4:08
2011	South American Championships	Buenos Aires, Argentina	2nd	1500 m	3:46.35
2011	South American Championships	Buenos Aires, Argentina	1st	3000 m s'chase	8:36.53
2011	Pan American Games	Guadalajara, Mexico	2nd	3000 m s'chase	8:48.75

=== Personal bests ===
- 800 metres - 1:45.69 (2000)
- 1500 metres - 3:33.25 (2005) - South American record
- One mile - 3:51.05 (2005) - South American record
- 2000 metres - 5:03.34 (2002) - South American record
- 3000 metres - 7:39.70 (2002) - South American record
- 5000 metres - 13:42.56 (2006)
- 3000 metres steeplechase - 8:30.70 (2006)
