= Omar Álvarez =

Spanish footballer (born 1990)

Personal information
- Full name: Omar Álvarez Burgos
- Date of birth: 29 August 1990 (age 36)
- Place of birth: Oviedo, Spain
- Height: 1.65 m (5 ft 5 in)
- Position: Forward

Team information
- Current team: Langreo
- Number: 11

Youth career
- Oviedo
- 2008–2009: Cultural Leonesa

Senior career*
Years	Team	Apps	(Gls)
2009–2010	Cultural Leonesa B	18	(3)
2009–2010	Cultural Leonesa	16	(2)
2010–2013	Osasuna B	91	(7)
2013–2014	Fokikos	24	(4)
2014–2016	Marino	58	(9)
2016	Socuéllamos	16	(1)
2016–2017	Arandina	32	(0)
2017–2018	Formentera	17	(0)
2018–2019	Alcobendas	19	(0)
2019–2020	Formentera	44	(17)
2020–2021	Ibiza IP	22	(1)
2021–2022	Marino Luanco	29	(1)
2022–2024	Covadonga	40	(7)
2024–	Langreo	57	(2)
- * Club domestic league appearances and goals as of 14 May 2026

Omar Álvarez Burgos (born 29 August 1990) is a Spanish footballer who plays for Langreo as a forward.

== Club career ==
Born on 29 August 1990, in Oviedo, Asturias, Álvarez graduated from Cultural y Deportiva Leonesa, after a stint with hometown's Real Oviedo. He made his debut as a senior with the reserves in the 2009–10 campaign in Tercera División, also appearing with the main squad in Segunda División B.

In June 2010, Álvarez moved to CA Osasuna B, also in the third level. In September 2013, after the Navarrese side's relegation, he moved abroad for the first time in his career, joining Football League Greece side Fokikos A.C.

Álvarez played his first match as a professional on 30 September, starting and playing the full 90 minutes in a 2–2 home draw against Kallithea He scored his first goal on 24 November, scoring the winner in a 2–1 home success over Episkopi F.C.

On 12 July 2014, Álvarez returned to Spain, joining Marino de Luanco in the third division.
