= Miguel Barzola =

Argentine long-distance runner

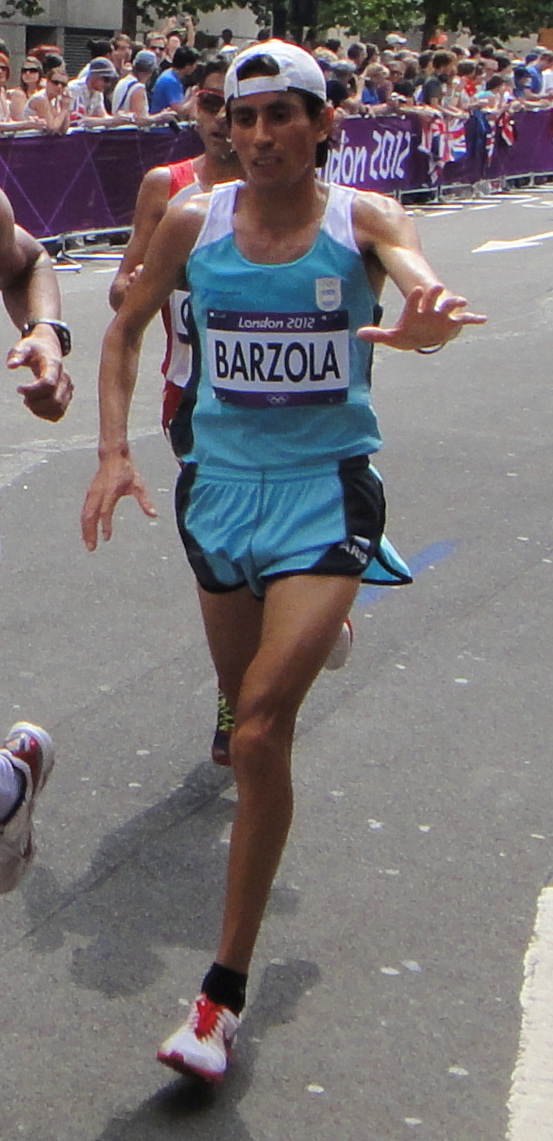
- Barzola in the marathon at the 2012 Summer Olympics in London

Personal information
- Full name: Miguel Ángel Barzola
- Born: 14 May 1982 (age 43) Bragado, Argentina
- Height: 1.72 m (5 ft 8 in)
- Weight: 54 kg (119 lb)

Sport
- Country: Argentina
- Sport: Athletics
- Event: Marathon

Miguel Ángel Barzola (born 14 May 1982) is an Argentine long-distance runner. At the 2012 Summer Olympics, he competed in the Men's marathon, finishing in 35th place.
