= Verónica Páez =

Argentine marathon runner

Verónica Natalia Páez (born April 17, 1974) is a female marathon runner from Argentina who is a two-time winner of the Buenos Aires Marathon in her native country (2003 and 2004). She twice won the Argentine title in the women's marathon, both times in Santa Rosa (2003 and 2005).

== Achievements ==
- All results regarding marathon, unless stated otherwise

| Year | Competition | Venue | Position | Notes |
Representing Argentina
| 2003 | Buenos Aires Marathon | Buenos Aires, Argentina | 1st | 2:52:04 |
| 2004 | Buenos Aires Marathon | Buenos Aires, Argentina | 1st | 2:55:04 |
