= María Eugenia Rodríguez =

Venezuelan footballer (born 1994)

Personal information
- Full name: María Eugenia Rodríguez Ruiz
- Date of birth: 26 November 1994 (age 31)
- Place of birth: Caracas, Venezuela
- Height: 1.70 m (5 ft 7 in)
- Positions: Centre back; defensive midfielder

Team information
- Current team: Famalicão

Senior career*
Years	Team	Apps	(Gls)
2012-2015	Caracas F.C.		
2016	Estudiantes de Guárico FC		
2017	Atlético Bucaramanga		
2018	Deportivo ITA		
2019	Santiago Morning		
2020	Atlético Bucaramanga		
2021–	Famalicão		

International career^{‡}
2010	Venezuela U17	2	(0)
2014	Venezuela U20	1+	(1)
2010–	Venezuela	2	(0)
- * Club domestic league appearances and goals ‡ National team caps and goals as of 22:06, 23 March 2015 (UTC)

María Eugenia Rodríguez Ruiz (born 26 November 1994) is a Venezuelan footballer who plays as a defender for Famalicão and the Venezuela women's national team.

== Club career ==
Rodríguez played the 2018 Copa Libertadores Femenina for Bolivian side Deportivo ITA.

She joined her first European club in July 2021, signing for Famalicão of the Portuguese Campeonato Nacional Feminino.

== International career ==
Rodríguez represented Venezuela at the 2010 FIFA U-17 Women's World Cup and the 2014 South American U-20 Women's Championship. At senior level, she played the 2010 South American Women's Football Championship and the 2018 Central American and Caribbean Games.
