= Jonathan Monje =

Chilean long-distance runner

Personal information
- Born: August 25, 1981 (age 45) Talcahuano, Chile

Sport
- Sport: Marathon running

Jonathan Felipe Monje Pacheco (born August 25, 1981) is a Chilean long-distance runner.

Monje was born in Talcahuano. He finished eleventh in the 10,000 metres at the 2000 World Junior Championships and eighth in the half marathon at the 2003 Summer Universiade. He has also competed at the World Cross Country Championships in 2001, 2002, 2003 and 2006.

Monje's personal best half marathon time is 1:04:38 hours, achieved in June 2001 in Osorno. He has 29:31.80 minutes in the 10,000 metres, achieved in April 2004 in Concepción, Chile.

Monje has won a number of medals at the South American Cross Country Championships. After winning a silver in the junior race in 2001, he went on to win the long race gold and short race bronze medals in 2002. The following year he took the long race silver and another short bronze medal. He won the long race silver medal for a second time in 2006.
