= Marlene Flores =

Bolivian footballer (born 2001)

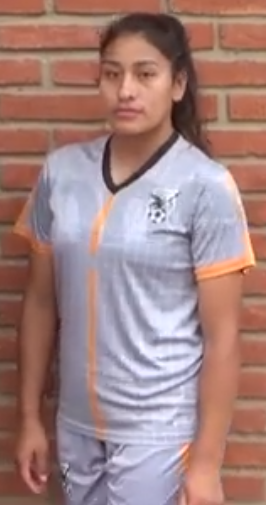
- Flores in 2019

Personal information
- Date of birth: 23 April 2001 (age 25)
- Place of birth: Santa Cruz de la Sierra, Bolivia
- Position: Forward

Team information
- Current team: Missouri Valley College
- Number: 21

College career
Years	Team	Apps	(Gls)
2024–	Missouri Valley College	42	(18)

International career
2025	Bolivia		

Marlene Flores (born 23 April 2001) is a Bolivian footballer who plays as a forward for Missouri Valley College.

== Early life ==
Flores was born in Santa Cruz de la Sierra, Bolivia.

== Playing career ==
Flores joined the Missouri Valley College women's soccer team in the 2024–25 season. In her first season with the team, she recorded 11 goals and 4 assists in 19 games played. In the 2025–26 season, she recorded 7 goals and 7 assists in 23 games.

Flores represented Bolivia as a member of the women's national team in the 2025 Copa América Femenina.
