= Elenilson da Silva =

Brazilian long-distance runner

Personal information
- Born: 24 January 1972 (age 54) Jardim, Brazil
Medal record
Men's athletics
Representing Brazil
Pan American Games
Gold medal – first place	1999 Winnipeg	10,000 metres
Silver medal – second place	1999 Winnipeg	5,000 metres

Elenilson da Silva (born 24 January 1972 in Jardim) is a retired long-distance runner from Brazil. He is best known for winning the gold medal in the men's 10.000 metres at the 1999 Pan American Games in Winnipeg, Manitoba, Canada.

== Personal Bests ==
- 3,000 m — 8:01.62 (Rio de Janeiro, 2003)
- 5,000 m — 14:30.61 (Fortaleza, 2007)
- 10,000 m — 28:13.69 (Montréal, 2000)
- Marathon — 2:12:14 (Berlin, 2001)
