= Artur Nogueira =

Municipality in the state of São Paulo in Brazil

- Municipality
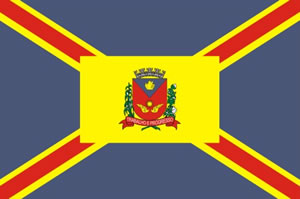
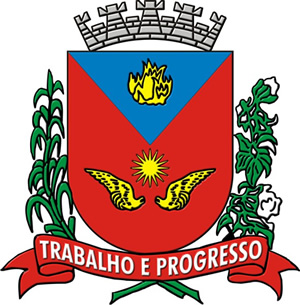
- Flag Coat of arms

- Location in São Paulo state

- Location in Brazil
- Coordinates: 22°34′23″S 47°10′21″W
- Country: Brazil
- Region: Southeast Brazil
- State: São Paulo
- Metropolitan Region: Campinas

Area
  - Total: 178.03 km^{2} (68.74 sq mi)
- Elevation: 595 m (1,952 ft)

Population (2020)
  - Total: 55,340
  - Density: 310.8/km^{2} (805.1/sq mi)
- Time zone: UTC−3 (BRT)

Artur Nogueira is a city in the state of São Paulo in Brazil. It is part of the Metropolitan Region of Campinas. The population is 55,340 (2020 est.) in an area of 178.03 km^{2}. The elevation is 595 m.

The UNASP (São Paulo Seventh-Day Adventist University) is nearby.

== History ==
The municipality was created by state law in 1948.

Map of the state of São Paulo (1948).

== Demographics ==
Historical population (municipality)
Year	Population	%±
1950	5,894	—
1960	8,210	39.3%
1970	10,171	23.9%
1980	15,932	56.6%
1991	28,053	76.1%
2000	33,124	18.1%
2010	44,177	33.4%
2022	51,456	16.5%

== Media ==
In telecommunications, the city was served by Telecomunicações de São Paulo. In July 1998, this company was acquired by Telefónica, which adopted the Vivo brand in 2012. The company is currently an operator of cell phones, fixed lines, internet (fiber optics/4G) and television (satellite and cable).

== Religion ==
Christianity is present in the city as follows:

=== Catholic Church ===
The Catholic church in the municipality is part of the Roman Catholic Diocese of Limeira.

=== Protestant Church ===
The most diverse evangelical beliefs are present in the city, mainly Pentecostal, including the Assemblies of God in Brazil (the largest evangelical church in the country), Christian Congregation in Brazil, among others. These denominations are growing more and more throughout Brazil.

== See also ==
- List of municipalities in São Paulo
- Interior of São Paulo
