= Spain at the 2022 European Championships =

in (Germany) Munich 11 August 2022 – 22 August 2022
- Competitors: 236 in 12 sports
- Medals Ranked 6th: Gold 9 Silver 11 Bronze 12 Total 32

European Championships appearances
- 2018; 2022

Spain will compete at the 2022 European Championships in Munich from August 11 to August 22, 2022.

== Medallists ==
Medal	Name	Sport	Event	Date
Gold	Miguel Ángel López	Athletics	Men's 35 kilometres walk	16 August
Gold	Asier Martínez	Athletics	Men's 110 metres hurdles	17 August
Gold	María Corbera	Canoeing	Women's C–1 500 metres	19 August
Gold	Álvaro Martín	Athletics	Men's 20 kilometres walk	20 August
Gold	Juan Antonio Valle	Canoeing	Men's KL3 200 metres	21 August
Gold	Joan Antoni Moreno; Adrian Sieiro	Canoeing	Men's C-2 500 metres	21 August
Gold	Antía Jácome	Canoeing	Women's C-1 200 metres	21 August
Gold	María Corbera	Canoeing	Women' C-1 5000 metres	21 August
Gold	Mariano García	Athletics	Men's 800 metres	21 August
Silver	Aleix García Pujolar; Rodrigo Conde	Rowing	Men's double sculls	14 August
Silver	Marta Galimany; Elena Loyo; Laura Méndez Esquer; Irene Pelayo	Athletics	Women's marathon team	15 August
Silver	Raquel González	Athletics	Women's 35 kilometres walk	16 August
Silver	Mohamed Katir	Athletics	Men's 5000 metres	16 August
Silver	Francisco Cubelos; Roi Rodríguez; Pedro Vázquez; Íñigo Peña	Canoeing	Men's K–4 1000 metres	19 August
Silver	Higinio Rivero	Canoeing	Men's VL2 200 metres	19 August
Silver	Pablo Graña	Canoeing	Men's C–1 200 metres	20 August
Silver	Francisco Cubelos; Íñigo Peña	Canoeing	Men's K–2 1000 metres	21 August
Silver	Walter Bouzán	Canoeing	Men's K-1 5000 metres	21 August
Silver	Antía Jácome; María Corbera	Canoeing	Women's C–2 200 metres	21 August
Silver	Antoni Segura; Alfonso Benavides	Canoeing	Men's C–2 200 metres	21 August
Bronze	Jaime Canalejo; Javier García Ordóñez	Rowing	Men's coxless pair	13 August
Bronze	Alberto Ginés López	Sport climbing	Men's lead	14 August
Bronze	Jorge Blanco; Ayad Lamdassem; Daniel Mateo; Abdelaziz Merzougui; Yago Rojo	Athletics	Men's marathon team	15 August
Bronze	Sebastián Mora	Cycling	Men's omnium	15 August
Bronze	María Xiao	Table tennis	Women's doubles	18 August
Bronze	Alberto Ginés López	Sport climbing	Men's boulder & lead	18 August
Bronze	Mario García	Athletics	Men's 1500 metres	18 August
Bronze	Laia Pèlachs; Begoña Lazkano	Canoeing	Women's K–2 1000 metres	19 August
Bronze	Diego García	Athletics	Men's 20 kilometres walk	20 August
Bronze	Isabel Contreras	Canoeing	Women's K–1 1000 metres	21 August
Bronze	Eva Barrios	Canoeing	Women's K-1 5000 metres	21 August
Bronze	Joel Plata	Gymnastics	Men's horizontal bar	21 August

== Competitors ==
The following is the list of number of competitors in the Championships:

Sport	Men	Women	Total
Athletics	49	40	89
Beach volleyball	2	6	8
Gymnastics (men and women)	5	5	10
Canoe sprint	26	17	43
Cycling BMX	2	1	3
Cycling mountain bike	3	3	6
Cycling road	8	7	15
Cycling track	8	6	14
Rowing	11	11	22
Sport climbing	6	4	10
Table tennis	4	4	8
Triathlon	4	4	9
Total	128	108	236

== Athletics ==
Spain entered the following athletes.

Key

- Q = Qualified for the next round
- q = Qualified for the next round as a fastest loser or, in field events, by position without achieving the qualifying target
- NR = National record
- PB = Personal best
- SB = Season best
- N/A = Round not applicable for the event

=== Men ===
Track & road events

Athlete	Event	Heat		Semifinal		Final	
Athlete	Event	Result	Rank	Result	Rank	Result	Rank
Sergio López	100 m	DQ		did not advance			
Pol Retamal	200 m	Bye		20.38	7 q	20.63	6
Daniel Rodríguez	200 m	20.80	9 Q	20.75	15	did not advance	
Iñaki Cañal	400 m	45.83 PB	11 Q	46.10	18	did not advance	
Manuel Guijarro	400 m	46.18	18	did not advance			
Óscar Husillos	400 m	46.42	24	did not advance			
Álvaro de Arriba	800 m	1:47.94	22	did not advance			
Adrián Ben	800 m	1:47.64	11 Q	1:49.26	15	did not advance	
Mariano García	800 m	1:47.66	13 Q	1:46.52	1 Q	1:44.85 PB	1st place, gold medalist(s)
Ignacio Fontes	1500 m	3:39.00	10 Q	—		3:42.30	11
Gonzalo García Garrido	1500 m	3:39.20	11 Q	—		3:37.40	6
Mario García	1500 m	3:38.04	3 Q	—		3:34.88	3rd place, bronze medalist(s)
Mohamed Katir	5000 m	—				13:22.98 SB	2nd place, silver medalist(s)
Adel Mechaal	5000 m	—				13:35.92	14
Abdessamad Oukhelfen	5000 m	—				13:33.63	12
Roberto Aláiz	10000 m	—				28:14.86	14
Juan Antonio Pérez	10000 m	—				28:38.21	17
Enrique Llopis	110 m hurdles	Bye		13.30 PB	3 Q	14.81	7
Asier Martínez	110 m hurdles	Bye		13.25	1 Q	13.17	1st place, gold medalist(s)
Jesús David Delgado	400 m hurdles	50.61	15 Q	50.32	22	did not advance	
Aleix Porras	400 m hurdles	50.77	17	did not advance			
Daniel Arce	3000 m steeplechase	8:32.27	8 Q	—		8:25.00	4
Sebastián Martos	3000 m steeplechase	8:34.19	13 q	—		8:26.68	6
Víctor Ruiz	3000 m steeplechase	8:32.48	9 Q	—		8:37.24	13
Alberto Calero; Jesús Gómez; Sergio López; Pablo Montalvo	4×100 m relay	11	39.14	—		did not advance	
Lucas Búa; Iñaki Cañal ^{(only final)} Samuel García; Óscar Husillos; Manuel Guijarro ^{(only heat)}	4×400 m relay	3:01.27 SB	1 Q	—		3:00.54 NR	4
Jorge Blanco	Marathon	—				2:13:18 SB	12
Ayad Lamdassem	Marathon	—				2:39:15	6
Daniel Mateo	Marathon	—				2:14:34	14
Abdelaziz Merzougui	Marathon	—				2:19:47 SB	43
Yago Rojo	Marathon	—				2:14:41 SB	15
Ayad Lamdassem; Jorge Blanco; Daniel Mateo; Yago Rojo; Abdelaziz Merzougui	Marathon Cup	—				6:38:44	3rd place, bronze medalist(s)
Alberto Amezcua	20 km walk	—				1:20:00	4
Diego García	20 km walk	—				1:19:45 SB	3rd place, bronze medalist(s)
Iván López	20 km walk	—				1:22:55	11
Álvaro Martín	20 km walk	—				1:19:11 PB	1st place, gold medalist(s)
Manuel Bermúdez	35 km walk	—				2:32:31	4
Miguel Ángel López	35 km walk	—				2:26:49 CR	1st place, gold medalist(s)
Marc Tur	35 km walk	—				DQ	

Field events

Athlete	Event	Qualification		Final	
Athlete	Event	Distance	Position	Distance	Position
Eusebio Cáceres	Long jump	7.93	3 q	7.98	4
Héctor Santos	Long jump	7.75	10 q	7.82	7
Marcos Ruiz	Triple jump	16.76	5 q	16.78	5
Pablo Torrijos	Triple jump	16.12	11 q	NM	
Carlos Tobalina	Shot put	19.58	16	did not advance	
Javier Cienfuegos	Hammer throw	73.26	12 q	73.06	11
Manu Quijera	Javelin throw	76.67	14	did not advance	

=== Women ===
Track & road events

Athlete	Event	Heat		Semifinal		Final	
Athlete	Event	Result	Rank	Result	Rank	Result	Rank
Jaël Bestué	100 m	11.39	3 Q	11.40	12	did not advance	
Sonia Molina-Prados	100 m	11.64	21	did not advance			
María Isabel Pérez	100 m	Bye		11.35	8 Q	11.28	6
Lucía Carrillo	200 m	23.64	21	did not advance			
Paula Sevilla	200 m	Bye		23.19	10	did not advance	
Marina Martínez	800 m	2:03.45	17	did not advance			
Lucía Pinacchio	800 m	2:01.63 PB	4 q	2:06.82	16	did not advance	
Águeda Marqués	1500 m	4:07.78	18	—		did not advance	
Marta Pérez	1500 m	4:07.27	14	—		did not advance	
Carla Gallardo	5000 m	—				15:52.64	16
Marta García Alonso	5000 m	—				15:23.36 PB	12
Cristina Ruiz	5000 m	—				16:07.70	17
Beatriz Álvarez	10000 m	—				33:04.18	15
Maitane Melero	10000 m	—				33:46.71	17
Xènia Benach	100 m hurdles	13.26	4 Q	13.18	16	did not advance	
Sara Gallego	400 m hurdles	Bye		55.16	1 Q	54.97	4
Carla García	400 m hurdles	57.03	13	did not advance			
Blanca Fernández	3000 m steeplechase	10:00.26	23	—		did not advance	
Carolina Robles	3000 m steeplechase	9:45.70	12 q	—		9:38.96	11
Irene Sánchez-Escribano	3000 m steeplechase	9:41.12	8 Q	—		9:37.84	10
Sonia Molina-Prados; Jaël Bestué; Paula Sevilla; María Isabel Pérez	4×100 m relay	42.95	2 Q	—		43.03	4
Aauri Bokesa; Sara Gallego ^{(only final)} Eva Santidrián; Berta Segura; Laura Hernández ^{(only heat)}	4×400 m relay	3:27.76 SB	7 q	—		3:29.70	8
Marta Galimany	Marathon	—				2:31:14	11
Elena Loyo	Marathon	—				2:34:56 SB	18
Laura Méndez Esquer	Marathon	—				2:39:15 SB	32
Irene Pelayo	Marathon	—				2:33:15 SB	16
Marta Galimany; Irene Pelayo; Elena Loyo; Laura Méndez Esquer	Marathon Cup	—				7:39:25	2nd place, silver medalist(s)
María Pérez	20 km walk	—				DQ	
Antía Chamosa	35 km walk	—				3:06:37	15
Raquel González	35 km walk	—				2:49:10	2nd place, silver medalist(s)
Mar Juárez	35 km walk	—				2:55:27	7

Field events

Athlete	Event	Qualification		Final	
Athlete	Event	Distance	Position	Distance	Position
Irati Mitxelena	Long jump	6.36	15	did not advance	
María Belén Toimil	Shot put	17.72	10 q	17.86	10
Laura Redondo	Discus throw	67.62	13	did not advance	
Arantza Moreno	Javelin throw	56.02	16	did not advance	

Combined events – Heptathlon

Athlete	Event	100H	HJ	SP	200 m	LJ	JT	800 m	Final	Rank
Claudia Conte	Result	14.10	1.80	11.51	DNS	DNF				
Claudia Conte	Points	964	978	629	DNS	DNF				
María Vicente	Result	13.84	1.74	13.53	24.18	NM	DNS	DNF		
María Vicente	Points	1001	903	763	963	NM	DNS	DNF		

== Beach Volleyball ==
Austria has qualified 4 male and 2 female pairs.

Athlete	Event	Preliminary round			Round of 24	Round of 16	Quarterfinals	Semifinals	Final / BM	
Athlete	Event	Opposition Score	Opposition Score	Rank	Opposition Score	Opposition Score	Opposition Score	Opposition Score	Opposition Score	Rank
Pablo Herrera; Adrián Gavira	Men's	Huber – Dressler (AUT)								
Daniela Álvarez; Tania Moreno	Women's	Ahtiainen – Prihti (FIN)								
María Belén Carro; Angela Lobato	Women's	Kociołek – Łodej (POL)								
Paula Soria; Sofía González	Women's	Kliokmanaitė – Paulikienė (LTU)								

== Cycling ==
=== Road ===
Men

Athlete	Event	Time	Rank
Jon Aberasturi	Road race	4:38:49	9
Jorge Arcas	Road race	4:40:38	93
Xabier Azparren	Road race	4:45:27	119
Iván García Cortina	Road race	4:42:25	114
David González	Road race	4:40:34	89
Jonathan Lastra	Road race	4:39:04	36
Oier Lazkano	Road race	4:39:07	44
Manuel Peñalver	Road race	4:39:35	70

== Gymnastics ==
Spain has entered 5 men and 5 women.

=== Men ===
Qualification

Athlete	Event	Qualification								Final							
Athlete	Event	Apparatus						Total	Rank	Apparatus						Total	Rank
Athlete	Event	F	PH	R	V	PB	HB	Total	Rank	F	PH	R	V	PB	HB	Total	Rank
Néstor Abad	Team															—	
Thierno Diallo	Team															—	
Nicolau Mir	Team															—	
Joel Plata	Team															—	
Rayderley Zapata	Team															—	
Total	Team																

=== Women ===
Qualification

Athlete	Event	Qualification						Final					
Athlete	Event	Apparatus				Total	Rank	Apparatus				Total	Rank
Athlete	Event	V	UB	BB	F	Total	Rank	V	UB	BB	F	Total	Rank
Laura Casabuena	Team											—	
Emma Fernández	Team											—	
Marina González	Team											—	
Lorena Medina	Team											—	
Alba Petisco	Team											—	
Total	Team												

== Rowing ==
Men

Athlete	Event	Heats		Repechage		Semifinals		Final	
Athlete	Event	Time	Rank	Time	Rank	Time	Rank	Time	Rank
Jordi Jofre	Single sculls								
Aleix García; Rodrigo Conde	Double sculls								
Jaime Canalejo; Javier García	Coxless pair								
Daniel Gutiérrez	Lightweight single sculls								
Manel Balastegui; Caetano Horta	Lightweight double sculls								
Javier Reja	PR1 single sculls					—			

Women

Athlete	Event	Heats		Repechage		Semifinals		Final	
Athlete	Event	Time	Rank	Time	Rank	Time	Rank	Time	Rank
Virginia Díaz	Single sculls								
Julia Ros; Maria Fernanda Valencia; Aina Cid; Nuria Puig	Coxless four					—			
Natalia Miguel	Lightweight single sculls					—			
Rocio Lao; Ana Navarro	Lightweight double sculls								

Mixed

Athlete	Event	Heats		Final	
Athlete	Event	Time	Rank	Time	Rank
Josefa Benitez; Jorge Pineda; Enrique Floriano; Verónica Rodríguez; Leonor Garcia	PR3 coxed four				

== Triathlon ==
=== Men ===
Athlete	Event	Swim (1.5 km)	Trans 1	Bike (40 km)	Trans 2	Run (10 km)	Total Time	Rank
Sergio Baxter	Men's							
Genis Grau	Men's							
Mario Mola	Men's							
Antonio Serrat	Men's							

=== Women ===
Athlete	Event	Swim (1.5 km)	Trans 1	Bike (40 km)	Trans 2	Run (10 km)	Total Time	Rank
Miriam Casillas	Women's							
Anna Godoy	Women's							
Noelia Juan	Women's							
Marta Pintanel	Women's							

=== Mixed ===
Athlete	Event	Swim (300 m)	Trans 1	Bike (6.8 km)	Trans 2	Run (2 km)	Total Group Time	Rank
	Mixed relay							
