= Charlie Dobson =

British sprinter (born 1999)

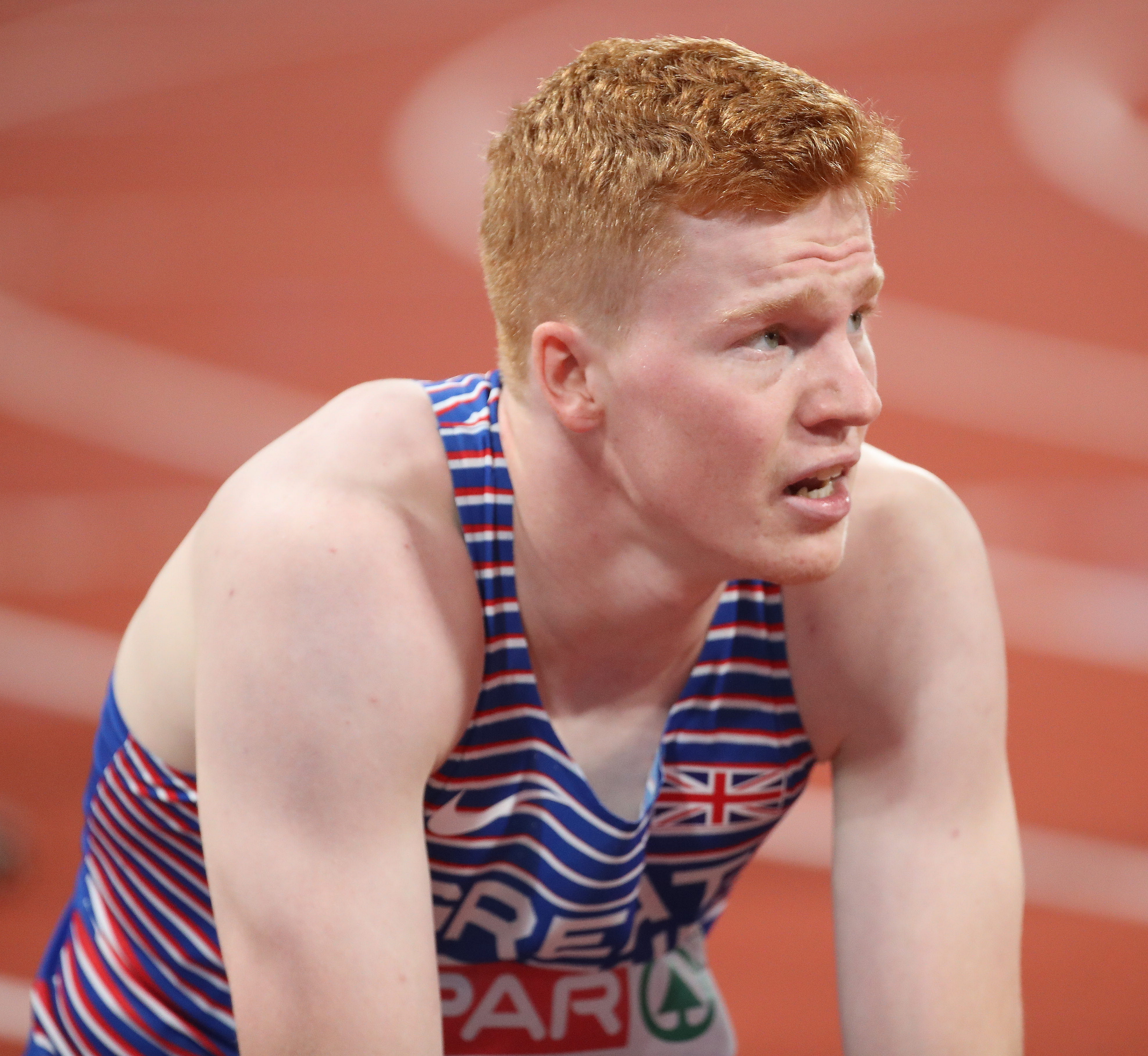
- Dobson in 2022

Personal information
- Born: 20 October 1999 (age 27) Colchester, Essex, England
- Education: Loughborough University

Sport
- Sport: Sprinting
- Events: 200 m, 400 m
- Club: Colchester Harriers

Achievements and titles
- Regional finals: 2022
Medal record
Men's athletics
Representing Great Britain
Olympic Games
Bronze medal – third place	2024 Paris	4 × 400 m
World Championships
Bronze medal – third place	2023 Budapest	4 × 400 m relay
IAAF World U20 Championships
Silver medal – second place	2018 Tampere	200 m
Diamond League
First place	2024	400 m
European Championships
Gold medal – first place	2022 Munich	4 × 400 m relay
Silver medal – second place	2024 Rome	400 m
Silver medal – second place	2026 Birmingham	4 × 400 m relay

Charlie Dobson (born 20 October 1999) is a British sprinter, specialising in the 400 metres and the 4 × 400 metres relay. An Olympic bronze medalist and European champion in the relay, Dobson made his senior individual breakthrough in 2024; he won a silver medal in the 400 metres at the 2024 European Athletics Championships, and won the 400 metres event at the 2024 British Athletics Championships. He was the surprise winner in the 400 metres final of the 2024 Diamond League in Brussels.

== Personal life ==
Dobson is from Colchester, Essex, England. He studied at St Benedict's Catholic College and Colchester Sixth Form College. As of 2022, he was a student of aeronautical engineering at Loughborough University.

== Career ==
Dobson competes for Colchester Harriers Athletics Club. He won his first international competition, which was the Loughborough International meeting. He came second in the 200 metres event at the 2018 IAAF World U20 Championships, finishing behind teammate Jona Efoloko. Dobson had set personal best times in the heat and semi-finals of the competition.

In 2020, Dobson set the British Universities & Colleges Sport record for the 60 metres event. In 2021, Dobson ran the 400 metres event once. His finishing time was the joint fastest by a Briton that year, tied with Matthew Hudson-Smith. He was selected in the British team for the 2021 World Athletics Relays, but injured himself prior to the event. The injury also prevented him from attempting to qualify for the delayed 2020 Summer Olympics; he had been hoping to make the British 4 × 400 metres team at the Games. He spent 10 months out with injury before returning in February 2022 at the Loughborough Indoor Open.

In April 2022, Dobson ran a 200 metres event in 20.19, the 11th fastest time by a Briton in history. Later in the year, he ran a wind-assisted 19.99 seconds to beat Nethaneel Mitchell-Blake. He was part of the British team that won the 4 × 400 m relay at the 2022 European Athletics Championships, alongside Matthew Hudson-Smith, Alex Haydock-Wilson and Lewis Davey. It was his first major relay. Dobson also finished fourth in the individual 200 metres event.

Dobson set a new personal best of 44.38s to win a silver medal in the 400 metres at the 2024 European Athletics Championships in Rome, Italy, on 10 June 2024. Later that month he won his first national 400 metres title at the 2024 British Athletics Championships to secure a place at the Paris Olympics where he went out in the semi-finals of the individual event before claiming a bronze medal as part of the Great Britain 4 × 400 metre relay team.

Dobson won the 400 metres at the 2024 Diamond League final in Brussels, Belgium, in a time of 44.49 seconds.

On 19 July 2025, Dobson won the 400 metres at the London Diamond League Meeting in a new personal best of 44.14 seconds. Shortly afterwards he retained his British title at the 2025 UK Athletics Championships.
