= 2005 South American Cross Country Championships =

- Organisers: CONSUDATLE
- Edition: 20th
- Date: February 19–20
- Host city: Montevideo, Uruguay
- Venue: Club de Golf del Uruguay
- Events: 8
- Distances: 12 km – Senior men 4 km – Men's short 8 km – Junior men (U20); 4 km – Youth men (U18); 8 km – Senior women 4 km – Women's short 6 km – Junior women (U20); 3 km – Youth women (U18)
- Participation: 138 athletes from 10 nations

The 2005 South American Cross Country Championships took place on February 19–20, 2005. The races were held at the Club de Golf del Uruguay in Montevideo, Uruguay. A detailed report of the event was given for the IAAF.

Complete results results for junior and youth competitions, and medal winners were published.

== Medallists ==
Event	Gold		Silver		Bronze	
Individual
Senior men (12 km)	William de Jesús Naranjo; Colombia	38:50	Gilson Vieira da Silva; Brazil	38:53	Silvio Guerra; Ecuador	39:13
Men's short (4 km)	Israel dos Anjos; Brazil	12:07	Germán Schiel; Argentina	12:11	José Alejandro Semprún; Venezuela	12:13
Junior (U20) men (8 km)	Jhon Tello; Colombia	27:11	Alison Vieira Gonçalves; Brazil	27:34	Pablo Mena; Chile	27:52
Youth (U18) men (4 km)	José Mauricio González; Colombia	12:55	Joaquín René Varas; Chile	13:00	Nahuel Luengo; Argentina	13:01
Senior women (8 km)	Lucélia de Oliveira Peres; Brazil	29:23	Susana Rebolledo; Chile	29:24	Maria Lúcia Alves Vieira; Brazil	30:19
Women's short (4 km)	Susana Rebolledo; Chile	14:02	Sandra Amarillo; Argentina	14:23	Karina Córdoba; Argentina	14:24
Junior (U20) women (6 km)	Jessica Quispe (Peru) Perú	21:53	Inés Melchor (Peru) Perú	22:19	Sabine Heitling; Brazil	22:49
Youth (U18) women (3 km)	Karina Villazana (Peru) Perú	11:20	Tatiane Raquel da Silva; Brazil	11:29	Carmen Mamani (Peru) Perú	11:32
Team
Senior men	Ecuador	12	Brazil	19	Venezuela	28
Men's short	Brazil	11	Venezuela	17	Argentina	21
Junior (U20) men	Brazil	10	Uruguay	15	Argentina	22
Youth (U18) men	Chile	8	Argentina	14	Uruguay	23
Senior women	Brazil	6	Uruguay	15		
Women's short	Argentina	9	Chile	14	Brazil	25
Junior (U20) women	(Peru) Perú	7	Brazil	14	Argentina	24
Youth (U18) women	(Peru) Perú	6	Argentina	18	Uruguay	21

== Race results ==
=== Senior men's race (12 km) ===
Individual race
Rank	Athlete	Country	Time
1st place, gold medalist(s)	William de Jesús Naranjo	Colombia	38:50
2nd place, silver medalist(s)	Gilson Vieira da Silva	Brazil	38:53
3rd place, bronze medalist(s)	Silvio Guerra	Ecuador	39:13
4	Ubiratan dos Santos	Brazil	39:41
5	Franklin Tenorio	Ecuador	39:44
6	Jhon Cusi	(Peru) Perú	39:46
7	Cristián Rosales	Uruguay	39:52
8	Edgar Chancusig	Ecuador	39:58
9	Jorge Cabrera	Paraguay	40:05
10	Santiago Figueroa	Argentina	40:06
11	José Alejandro Semprún	Venezuela	40:25
12	Jesús Angulo	Venezuela	40:37
13	Ernesto Zamora	Uruguay	40:49
14	Richard Arias	Ecuador	41:01
15	Manuel Bellorín	Venezuela	41:16
16	César Colna	Venezuela	41:23
17	Leonardo Malgor	Argentina	41:27
18	Alberto Olivera	Argentina	41:36
19	Sergio Palma	Argentina	41:43
20	Rubén Ramírez	Uruguay	41:50
21	Sérgio da Silva	Brazil	41:58
22	William Peñaloza	Ecuador	42:01
23	Luis Nogués	Uruguay	42:11
24	Gustavo López	Paraguay	43:21
25	Óscar Fernández	Uruguay	43:44
26	Ausberto Lucas	Bolivia	44:10
27	Antonio Ibáñez	Argentina	44:15
—	Pablo Gardiol	Uruguay	DNF

Teams
Rank	Team	Points
1st place, gold medalist(s)	Ecuador: Silvio Guerra / 2; Franklin Tenorio / 4; Edgar Chancusig / 6; (Richard Arias) / (n/s); (William Peñaloza) / (n/s)	12
2nd place, silver medalist(s)	Brazil: Gilson Vieira da Silva / 1; Ubiratan dos Santos / 3; Sérgio da Silva / 15	19
3rd place, bronze medalist(s)	Venezuela: José Alejandro Semprún / 8; Jesús Angulo / 9; Manuel Bellorín / 11; (César Colna) / (n/s)	28
4	Uruguay: Cristian Rosales / 5; Ernesto Zamora / 10; Rubén Ramírez / 14; (Luis Nogués) / (n/s); (Oscar Fernández) / (n/s); (Pablo Gardiol) / (DNF)	29
5	Argentina: Santiago Figueroa / 7; Leonardo Malgor / 12; Alberto Olivera / 13; (Sergio Palma) / (n/s); (Antonio Ibáñez) / (n/s)	32

- Note: Athletes in parentheses did not score for the team result. (n/s: nonscorer)

=== Men's short race (4 km) ===
Individual race
Rank	Athlete	Country	Time
1st place, gold medalist(s)	Israel dos Anjos	Brazil	12:07
2nd place, silver medalist(s)	Germán Schiel	Argentina	12:11
3rd place, bronze medalist(s)	José Alejandro Semprún	Venezuela	12:13
4	Jhon Cusi	(Peru) Perú	12:13
5	Gladson Silva Barbosa	Brazil	12:18
6	Nico José Herrera	Venezuela	12:29
7	André Alberi de Santana	Brazil	12:33
8	Jorge Cabrera	Paraguay	12:35
9	Carlos Balcedo	Argentina	12:38
10	César Colna	Venezuela	12:38
11	Manuel Bellorín	Venezuela	12:41
12	Jesús Angulo	Venezuela	12:42
13	Martín Mañana	Uruguay	12:43
14	Esteban Coria	Argentina	12:48
15	Alejandro de los Santos	Uruguay	13:01
16	Leonardo Price	Argentina	13:06
17	Walter Salinas	Uruguay	13:11
18	Alejandro Mesa	Uruguay	13:18
19	Fabián Romaszczuk	Argentina	13:18
20	Nelson Zamora	Uruguay	13:24
21	Emigdio Delgado	Venezuela	13:25
22	Cristian Gómez	Uruguay	13:27
23	Mariano Mastromarino	Argentina	13:33
24	Gustavo López	Paraguay	13:35
25	Aldo Franco	Paraguay	13:56
26	Valentín Valdovinos	Paraguay	14:24

Teams
Rank	Team	Points
1st place, gold medalist(s)	Brazil: Israel dos Anjos / 1; Gladson Silva Barbosa / 4; André Alberi de Santana / 6	11
2nd place, silver medalist(s)	Venezuela: José Alejandro Semprún / 3; Nico José Herrera / 5; César Colna / 9; (Manuel Bellorín) / (n/s); (Jesús Angulo) / (n/s); (Emigdio Delgado) / (n/s)	17
3rd place, bronze medalist(s)	Argentina: Germán Schiel / 2; Carlos Balcedo / 8; Esteban Coria / 11; (Leonardo Price) / (n/s); (Fabián Romaszczuk) / (n/s); (Mariano Mastromarino) / (n/s)	21
4	Uruguay: Martín Mañana / 10; Alejandro de los Santos / 12; Walter Salinas / 13; (Alejandro Mesa) / (n/s); (Nelson Zamora) / (n/s); (Cristian Gómez) / (n/s)	35
5	Paraguay: Jorge Cabrera / 7; Gustavo López / 14; Aldo Franco / 15; (Valentín Valdovinos) / (n/s)	36

- Note: Athletes in parentheses did not score for the team result. (n/s: nonscorer)

=== Junior (U20) men's race (8 km) ===
Individual race
Rank	Athlete	Country	Time
1st place, gold medalist(s)	Jhon Tello	Colombia	27:11
2nd place, silver medalist(s)	Alison Vieira Gonçalves	Brazil	27:34
3rd place, bronze medalist(s)	Pablo Mena	Chile	27:52
4	Joílson da Silva	Brazil	28:13
5	Diego Maurelli	Argentina	28:30
6	José Luis Pérez	Uruguay	28:50
7	Nicolás Cuestas	Uruguay	28:55
8	Matías Fabregat	Uruguay	29:01
9	Israel Mecabo	Brazil	29:07
10	Agustín Bernadas	Argentina	29:18
11	Aldo Franco	Paraguay	29:21
12	Derlis Ayala	Paraguay	29:26
13	César Ñanco	Argentina	29:49
14	Roberto González	Paraguay	29:54
15	Pablo Cuba	Bolivia	30:05
16	Cristopher Mininni	Uruguay	30:14
17	Carlos Torres	Uruguay	30:21
18	Martín Cuestas	Uruguay	30:27
—	Cristian Crobat	Argentina	DNF
—	Luis Chaparro	Argentina	DNS
—	Carlos Báez	Paraguay	DNS

Teams
Rank	Team	Points
1st place, gold medalist(s)	Brazil: Alison Vieira Gonçalves / 1; Joílson da Silva / 2; Israel Mecabo / 7	10
2nd place, silver medalist(s)	Uruguay: José Luis Pérez / 4; Nicolás Cuestas / 5; Matías Fabregat / 6; (Cristopher Mininni) / (n/s); (Carlos Torres) / (n/s); (Martín Cuestas) / (n/s)	15
3rd place, bronze medalist(s)	Argentina: Diego Maurelli / 3; Agustín Bernadas / 8; César Ñanco / 11; (Cristian Crobat) / (DNF)	22
4	Paraguay: Aldo Franco / 9; Derlis Ayala / 10; Roberto González / 12	31

- Note: Athletes in parentheses did not score for the team result. (n/s: nonscorer)

=== Youth (U18) men's race (4 km) ===
Individual race
Rank	Athlete	Country	Time
1st place, gold medalist(s)	José Mauricio González	Colombia	12:55
2nd place, silver medalist(s)	Joaquín René Varas	Chile	13:00
3rd place, bronze medalist(s)	Nahuel Luengo	Argentina	13:01
4	Víctor Aravena	Chile	13:18
5	Ricardo Barrientos	Chile	13:19
6	Luciano Joaquín Almirón	Argentina	13:21
7	Eduardo Gregório	Uruguay	13:26
8	Luis Molina	Argentina	13:33
9	Matías Schiel	Argentina	13:36
10	Gustavo Espíndola	Argentina	13:37
11	Pablo Cuba	Bolivia	13:38
12	Gustavo Leite Barbosa	Brazil	13:39
13	Francisco Ponce de León	Chile	13:41
14	Roberto González	Paraguay	13:49
15	Ángel Portela	Uruguay	14:07
16	Jonathan Sasías	Uruguay	14:24
17	Juan Sosa	Uruguay	14:46
18	Mathias Grattan	Uruguay	14:54
19	Carlos Roberto Báez	Paraguay	15:20
20	Gervasio Tarragona	Uruguay	15:44
—	Derlis Ayala	Paraguay	DNF

Teams
Rank	Team	Points
1st place, gold medalist(s)	Chile: Joaquín René Varas / 1; Víctor Aravena / 3; Ricardo Barrientos / 4; (Francisco Ponce de León) / (n/s)	8
2nd place, silver medalist(s)	Argentina: Nahuel Luengo / 2; Luciano Joaquín Almirón / 5; Luis Molina / 7; (Matías Schiel) / (n/s); (Gustavo Espíndola) / (n/s)	14
3rd place, bronze medalist(s)	Uruguay: Eduardo Gregório / 6; Ángel Portela / 8; Jonathan Sasías / 9; (Juan Sosa) / (n/s); (Mathias Grattan) / (n/s); (Gervasio Tarragona) / (n/s)	23
—	Paraguay: Roberto González / n/s; Carlos Báez / n/s; Derlis Ayala / DdabNF	DNF

- Note: Athletes in parentheses did not score for the team result. (n/s: nonscorer)

=== Senior women's race (8 km) ===
Individual race
Rank	Athlete	Country	Time
1st place, gold medalist(s)	Lucélia de Oliveira Peres	Brazil	29:23
2nd place, silver medalist(s)	Susana Rebolledo	Chile	29:24
3rd place, bronze medalist(s)	Maria Lúcia Alves Vieira	Brazil	30:19
4	Clara Morales	Chile	30:20
5	Yolanda Fernández	Colombia	30:30
6	Marily dos Santos	Brazil	30:50
7	Elena Guerra	Uruguay	30:57
8	Estela María Martínez	Argentina	32:01
9	Carina Allay	Argentina	32:05
10	Luz Maldonado	Venezuela	32:21
11	Marisol Redón	Uruguay	35:59
12	Sonia Botta	Uruguay	36:39
—	Sandra Torres Álvarez	Argentina	DNF
—	Nadia Rodríguez	Argentina	DNF
—	Jimena Labraña	Chile	DNF
—	María Ercoli	Uruguay	DNF

Teams
Rank	Team	Points
1st place, gold medalist(s)	Brazil: Lucélia de Oliveira Peres / 1; Maria Lúcia Alves Vieira / 2; Marily dos Santos / 3	6
2nd place, silver medalist(s)	Uruguay: Elena Guerra / 4; Marisol Redón / 5; Sonia Botta / 6; (María Ercoli) / (DNF)	15
—	Chile: Susana Rebolledo / n/s; Clara Morales / n/s; Jimena Labraña / DNF	DNF
—	Argentina: Estela María Martínez / n/s; Carina Allay / n/s; Sandra Torres Álvarez / DNF; (Nadia Rodríguez) / (DNF)	DNF

- Note: Athletes in parentheses did not score for the team result. (n/s: nonscorer)

=== Women's short race (4 km) ===
Individual race
Rank	Athlete	Country	Time
1st place, gold medalist(s)	Susana Rebolledo	Chile	14:02
2nd place, silver medalist(s)	Sandra Amarillo	Argentina	14:23
3rd place, bronze medalist(s)	Karina Córdoba	Argentina	14:24
4	Nadia Rodríguez	Argentina	14:25
5	Clara Morales	Chile	14:28
6	María de los Ángeles Peralta	Argentina	14:36
7	Maria Lúcia Alves Vieira	Brazil	14:38
8	Elena Guerra	Uruguay	14:40
9	Jimena Labraña	Chile	14:51
10	Raquel Maraviglia	Argentina	15:04
11	Elizabete Ferreira Cruz	Brazil	15:16
12	Gisele Barros de Jesus	Brazil	15:34
15	Ana Paula Díaz	Uruguay	15:58
14	Marcela Valeria Britos	Uruguay	16:13
15	María Laura Basallo	Uruguay	16:53
16	Sonia Botta	Uruguay	17:09

Teams
Rank	Team	Points
1st place, gold medalist(s)	Argentina: Sandra Amarillo / 2; Karina Córdoba / 3; Nadia Rodríguez / 4; (María de los Ángeles Peralta) / (n/s); (Raquel Maraviglia) / (n/s)	9
2nd place, silver medalist(s)	Chile: Susana Rebolledo / 1; Clara Morales / 5; Jimena Labraña / 8	14
3rd place, bronze medalist(s)	Brazil: Maria Lúcia Alves Vieira / 6; Elizabete Ferreira Cruz / 9; Gisele Barros de Jesus / 10	25
4	Uruguay: Elena Guerra / 7; Ana Paula Díaz / 11; Marcela Valeria Britos / 12; (María Laura Basallo) / (n/s); (Sonia Botta) / (n/s)	30

- Note: Athletes in parentheses did not score for the team result. (n/s: nonscorer)

=== Junior (U20) women's race (6 km) ===
Individual race
Rank	Athlete	Country	Time
1st place, gold medalist(s)	Jessica Quispe	(Peru) Perú	21:53
2nd place, silver medalist(s)	Inés Melchor	(Peru) Perú	22:19
3rd place, bronze medalist(s)	Sabine Heitling	Brazil	22:49
4	Paola García	Colombia	23:14
5	Rocío Cantará	(Peru) Perú	23:16
6	Mary Emanuelly da Costa Oliveira	Brazil	23:41
7	Michele Cristina das Chagas	Brazil	23:56
8	Ingrid Galloso	Chile	24:06
9	Camila de Mello	Uruguay	24:44
10	Ivana Sánchez	Argentina	25:02
11	Andrea Latapie	Argentina	25:37
12	Gisela Benso	Argentina	26:03
13	Silvina Quiroga	Argentina	29:09

Teams
Rank	Team	Points
1st place, gold medalist(s)	(Peru) Perú: Yessica Quispe / 1; Inés Melchor / 2; Rocío Cantará / 4	7
2nd place, silver medalist(s)	Brazil: Sabine Heitling / 3; Mary Emanuelly da Costa Oliveira / 5; Michele Cristina das Chagas / 6	14
3rd place, bronze medalist(s)	Argentina: Ivana Sánchez / 7; Andrea Latapie / 8; Gisela Benso / 9; (Silvina Quiroga) / (n/s)	24

- Note: Athletes in parentheses did not score for the team result. (n/s: nonscorer)

=== Youth (U18) women's race (3 km) ===
Individual race
Rank	Athlete	Country	Time
1st place, gold medalist(s)	Karina Villazana	(Peru) Perú	11:20
2nd place, silver medalist(s)	Tatiane Raquel da Silva	Brazil	11:29
3rd place, bronze medalist(s)	Carmen Mamani	(Peru) Perú	11:32
4	Belén Chaisa	(Peru) Perú	11:36
5	Claudia Ramírez	Uruguay	11:49
6	Carolaine Leyton	Chile	11:50
7	Ana Milena Orjuela	Colombia	11:50
8	Débora Lescano	Argentina	12:23
9	Vanesa Monín	Argentina	12:25
10	Cristina Carrasco	Argentina	12:35
11	Romina Guinero	Argentina	12:41
12	María Cordero	Uruguay	13:01
13	Daiana Lema	Uruguay	13:23
14	Adriana Escurra	Paraguay	13:26
15	Ivana Batista	Uruguay	13:48
16	Florencia Machin	Uruguay	14:13
17	Luciana Acosta	Uruguay	16:35

Teams
Rank	Team	Points
1st place, gold medalist(s)	(Peru) Perú: Karina Villazana / 1; Carmen Mamani / 2; Belén Chaisa / 3	6
2nd place, silver medalist(s)	Argentina: Débora Lescano / 5; Vanesa Monín / 6; Cristina Carrasco / 7; (Romina Guinero) / (n/s)	18
3rd place, bronze medalist(s)	Uruguay: Claudia Ramírez / 4; María Cordero / 8; Daiana Lema / 9; (Ivana Batista) / (n/s); (Florencia Machin) / (n/s); (Luciana Acosta) / (n/s)	21

- Note: Athletes in parentheses did not score for the team result. (n/s: nonscorer)

== Medal table (unofficial) ==
* Host nation (Uruguay)

Rank	Nation	Gold	Silver	Bronze	Total
1	Brazil (BRA)	5	5	3	13
2	Peru (PER)	4	1	1	6
3	Colombia (COL)	3	0	0	3
4	Chile (CHI)	2	3	1	6
5	Argentina (ARG)	1	4	5	10
6	Ecuador (ECU)	1	0	1	2
7	Uruguay (URU)*	0	2	2	4
8	Venezuela (VEN)	0	1	2	3
Totals (8 entries)		16	16	15	47

- Note: Totals include both individual and team medals, with medals in the team competition counting as one medal.

== Participation ==
According to an unofficial count, 138 athletes from 10 countries participated.

- Argentina (36)
- Bolivia (2)
- Brazil (19)
- Chile (10)
- Colombia (6)
- Ecuador (5)
- Paraguay (8)
- (Peru) Perú (7)
- Uruguay (38)
- Venezuela (7)

== See also ==
- 2005 in athletics (track and field)
