= 2018 IAAF World U20 Championships – Men's 200 metres =

Men's 200 metres at the 2018 World U20 Championships
- Venue: Ratina Stadium
- Dates: 12 and 13 July
- Competitors: 40 from 31 nations
- Winning time: 20.48

Medalists
gold medal	Jona Efoloko	Great Britain
silver medal	Charles Dobson	Great Britain
bronze medal	Eric Harrison	United States

The men's 200 metres at the 2018 IAAF World U20 Championships was held at Ratina Stadium on 12 and 13 July.

== Records ==
Standing records prior to the 2018 IAAF World U20 Championships in Athletics
World Junior Record	Usain Bolt (JAM)	19.93	Devonshire, Bermuda	11 April 2004
Championship Record	Michael Norman Jr. (USA)	20.17	Bydgoszcz, Poland	22 July 2016
World Junior Leading	Christopher Taylor (JAM)	20.35	Kingston, Jamaica	24 March 2018

== Results ==
=== Heats ===
Qualification: First 4 of each heat (Q) and the 4 fastest times (q) qualified for the semifinals.

Wind:
Heat 1: -0.9 m/s, Heat 2: +0.4 m/s, Heat 3: -0.2 m/s, Heat 4: -0.1 m/s, Heat 5: +0.2 m/s, Heat 6: +0.2 m/s

Rank	Heat	Name	Nationality	Time	Note
1	4	Charles Dobson	Great Britain	20.65	Q, PB
2	3	Jona Efoloko	Great Britain	20.65	Q, PB
3	1	Khance Meyers	United States	20.70	Q
4	2	Eric Harrison	United States	20.73	Q
5	3	Milo Skupin-Alfa	Germany	20.80	Q, PB
6	5	Pol Retamal	Spain	20.81	Q, NJR
7	5	Henrik Larsson	Sweden	20.88	Q
8	1	Koki Ueyama	Japan	21.04	Q
9	5	Onyema Adigida	Netherlands	21.04	Q, NJR
10	3	Zane Branco	Australia	21.04	Q
11	5	Aaron Sexton	Ireland	21.06	Q, PB
12	2	Lorenzo Patta	Italy	21.09	Q, PB
13	2	Keigo Yasuda	Japan	21.20	Q
14	3	Daniel Vejražka	Czech Republic	21.22	Q
15	1	Paul Tritenne	France	21.23	Q
16	1	A.M. Salim Mohamed	Qatar	21.25	Q
17	4	Kasper Kadestål	Sweden	21.25	Q
18	2	Dickson Clever Kapandura	Zimbabwe	21.28	Q
19	1	Timothy Frederick	Trinidad and Tobago	21.30	q
20	3	Xavier Nairne	Jamaica	21.32	q
21	5	Ahmed Omar Jumah	Saudi Arabia	21.33	q
22	1	Juan Gonzáles	Spain	21.34	q
23	3	Matthew Clarke	Barbados	21.35	
24	4	Bartosz Zieliński	Poland	21.39	Q
25	4	William Reais	Switzerland	21.41	Q
26	5	Antonio Ivanov	Bulgaria	21.43	
27	2	Štěpán Hampl	Czech Republic	21.53	
28	4	Riku Illukka	Finland	21.57	
29	4	Ruben Els	South Africa	21.59	
30	1	Ramadin Pataudi Alexander Jr.	Netherlands Antilles	21.61	
31	4	Lorenzo Ianes	Italy	21.88	
32	3	Ako Hislop	Trinidad and Tobago	21.91	
33	3	Kristijan Subotić	Montenegro	22.08	NJR
34	5	Jacob El Aida Chaffey	Malta	22.17	PB
35	1	Tariq Polonius	Aruba	22.96	
36	2	Esmael Dos Ramos De O. Freitas	São Tomé and Príncipe	23.12	PB
	2	Rikkoi Brathwaite	British Virgin Islands	DQ	
	2	Joel Johnson	Bahamas	DNS	
	4	Minkyu Shin	South Korea	DNS	
	5	Thando Dlodlo	South Africa	DNS	

=== Semifinal ===
Qualification: First 2 of each heat (Q) and the 2 fastest times (q) qualified for the final.

Wind:
Heat 1: -0.6 m/s, Heat 2: +0.4 m/s, Heat 3: -0.3 m/s

Rank	Heat	Name	Nationality	Time	Note
1	1	Charles Dobson	Great Britain	20.53	Q, PB
2	3	Jona Efoloko	Great Britain	20.74	Q
3	2	Khance Meyers	United States	20.79	Q
4	1	Zane Branco	Australia	20.81	Q
5	1	Henrik Larsson	Sweden	20.85	q, PB
6	3	Eric Harrison	United States	20.86	Q
7	2	Pol Retamal	Spain	20.91	Q
8	1	Milo Skupin-Alfa	Germany	20.96	q
9	3	Onyema Adigida	Netherlands	21.10	
10	2	Lorenzo Patta	Italy	21.18	
11	1	A.M. Salim Mohamed	Qatar	21.20	
12	3	Koki Ueyama	Japan	21.24	
13	1	Keigo Yasuda	Japan	21.28	
14	2	Kasper Kadestål	Sweden	21.30	
15	2	Aaron Sexton	Ireland	21.33	
16	1	Juan Gonzáles	Spain	21.36	
17	1	Dickson Clever Kapandura	Zimbabwe	21.37	
18	2	Bartosz Zieliński	Poland	21.37	
19	3	Daniel Vejražka	Czech Republic	21.45	
20	2	Timothy Frederick	Trinidad and Tobago	21.48	
21	3	William Reais	Switzerland	21.51	
22	3	Ahmed Omar Jumah	Saudi Arabia	21.58	
23	2	Xavier Nairne	Jamaica	21.64	
24	3	Paul Tritenne	France	21.72	

=== Final ===
Wind: -0.1 m/s

Rank	Lane	Name	Nationality	Time	Note
1st place, gold medalist(s)	6	Jona Efoloko	Great Britain	20.48	PB
2nd place, silver medalist(s)	4	Charles Dobson	Great Britain	20.57	
3rd place, bronze medalist(s)	7	Eric Harrison	United States	20.79	
4	8	Pol Retamal	Spain	20.85	
5	5	Zane Branco	Australia	20.86	
6	3	Khance Meyers	United States	20.87	
7	1	Milo Skupin-Alfa	Germany	21.07	
	2	Henrik Larsson	Sweden	DNS	
