= Jérôme Baudson =

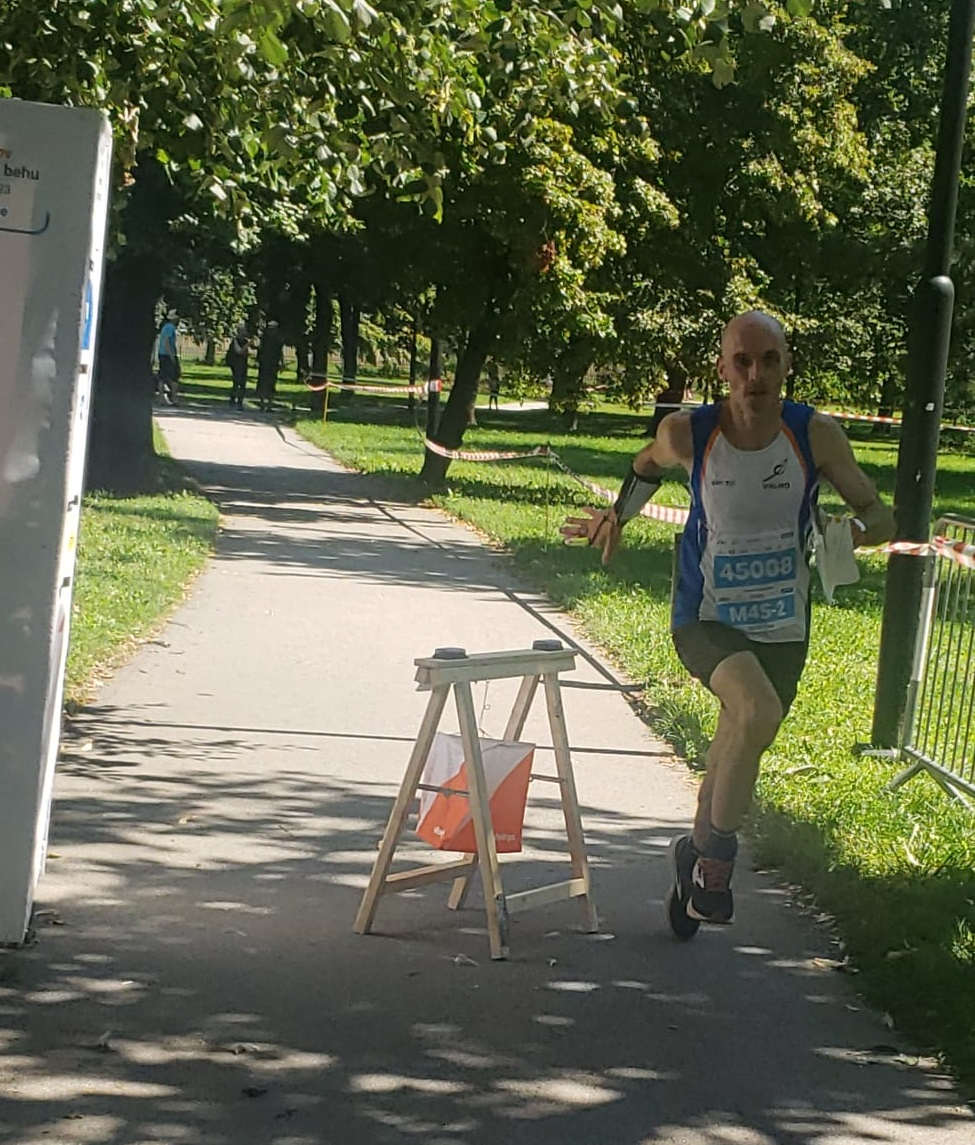

Personal information
- Nationality: France
- Education: University of Lille
- Occupations: Teacher, athlete

Sport
- Sport: Athletics, Orienteering
- Events: 3000 metres steeplechase (Athletics); Sprint (Orienteering)
- Club: US Tourcoing (1990–2000); Lille Métropole Athlétisme (2000–2014); VALMO (since 2014)

Achievements and titles
- Personal bests: 1500 m: 3:54.71 (2004); 3000 m steeple: 9:01.94 (2004); 3000 m : 8:31.21 (2004)
Medal record
Orienteering
World Masters Orienteering Championships
Gold medal – first place	2023 Košice	Sprint M45
Gold medal – first place	2025 Girona	Sprint M45
French National Championships
Gold medal – first place	2019	Night H40
Gold medal – first place	2023	Long Distance H45
Gold medal – first place	2023	Sprint H40-45
Gold medal – first place	2024	Sprint H40-45
Gold medal – first place	2019	Night H40
Silver medal – second place	2022	Long Distance H45
Silver medal – second place	2022	Sprint H40-45
Silver medal – second place	2025	Sprint H40-45
Bronze medal – third place	2017	Middle Distance H40

Jérôme Baudson is a French athlete and orienteer two-time World Masters Champion (WMOC) in Sprint (2023, 2025).

Initially a specialist in middle-distance running and the 3000m steeplechase during his athletics career (1989–2010), he successfully transitioned to orienteering, becoming a prominent figure in the Masters category. He is a two-time World Masters Champion (WMOC) in Sprint (2023, 2025).

He is often cited as a typical example of a "hybrid athlete," capable of transferring high-level physiological capabilities onto a discipline with a strong cognitive component.

== Biography ==
=== Academic career ===
Jérôme Baudson is a teacher of Physical Education and Sports (EPS). He teaches at the Faculty of Sports Sciences (STAPS) at the University of Lille.

=== Athletics Career (1998–2010) ===
Baudson began his sporting career in athletics in 1989, joining the EFSRA Reims club. He spent two decades in the French athletics federal structures, later competing for US Tourcoing and Lille Métropole Athlétisme (LMA).

- Track Profile: His main discipline was the 3000 metres steeplechase, a demanding event combining endurance and obstacle clearance. His official personal best is 9:10.94 (2007), although unofficial sources credit him with a time close to 9 minutes.
- Speed: He possessed high basic speed for a distance runner, with a 1500 metres record of 3:54.71 (set on June 20, 2004), a performance ranking him at the National N3 level at the time.
- Cross Country: He won a silver medal in the team event at the French Cross Country Championships with LMA.
- Longevity: He demonstrated an ability to maintain his physical level over the long term, running 10 km on the road in 33:56 at the age of 42.

=== Transition to Orienteering ===
The transition from athletics to orienteering occurred gradually, notably through the discovery of the "Orient'Show" format introduced by Serguei Smirnov.

==== Experience in Brazil (2014) ====
A stay of several years in Brazil marked a turning point in his practice. He was a member of the Clube de Orientação de Curitiba (COC). During this period, he discovered exotic terrains and participated in the 2014 South American Championships in the Elite category, finishing 4th in the Sprint.

He maintained his athletic fitness during his stay, running the Rio de Janeiro Half Marathon in 1:17:50 in 2015.

==== Involvement with VALMO ====
Upon returning to France, he joined the VALMO club (Villeneuve d'Ascq Lille Métropole Orientation), which competes in the National 1 division. He is currently the **President** of the club. Beyond his executive role and his status as an athlete, he invests himself technically as a mapper (notably for the Cité Scientifique map at the University of Lille) and course planner.

=== Masters Orienteering Career (2017–Present) ===
Competing in the Masters categories (Men 40 and Men 45), Jérôme Baudson built his international record by capitalizing on his speed qualities (from the 1500 m) and his obstacle crossing agility (from the steeplechase).

==== National Rise ====
On the French circuit (FFCO), he progressively established himself as the leader of the H40 and then H45 categories.

- French Night Champion H40 (2019): He won this technical title by beating his teammate Ondrej Kotecky by only 10 seconds.
- French Long Distance Champion H45 (2023): He made an impression by winning in 59:59 ahead of Fabrice Vannier, a multiple world champion and legend of the discipline.
- He is also a pillar of his club's relay team in National 1, contributing to VALMO's historic 8th place at the French Club Championships (CFC) in 2022.

==== World Masters Success (WMOC) ====
His participation in the World Masters Orienteering Championships (WMOC) followed a marked narrative progression.

- 2022 (Italy) – Disappointment: He was disqualified ("pm") in the Sprint final due to a punching error, while aiming for the title. He partially redeemed himself with a 3rd place in the Middle Distance B final.
- 2023 (Košice, Slovakia) – Title in Adversity: Despite a chaotic journey (car breakdown, theft of equipment), he dominated the competition and became World Champion in Sprint M45 (12:49). This victory was the result of specific preparation supervised by Jérôme Danel.
- 2025 (Girona, Spain) – Confirmation: He assumed his status as favorite and retained his title, winning a second gold medal in Sprint M45 (14:40). He also proved his progress in dense forest by finishing 6th in the Middle Distance final.

== Style and Technical Characteristics ==
Performance analysis highlights a specific profile:

- The "Speed Reserve": Unlike many veterans coming from pure endurance, Baudson possesses a very high terminal velocity (vVO2max) thanks to his middle-distance background. This allows him to create significant gaps on running sections of urban sprints.
- "Steeplechaser" Agility: His barrier-crossing technique acquired in the 3000 m steeplechase transfers to the urban environment (jumping low walls, stairs), offering him superior running economy.
- Mental Preparation: To counter attention errors, he implemented strict routines, including 5 minutes of proprioception before each start to isolate himself sensorially.
- Map Reading: He favors urban terrains with clear geometry, requiring rapid (binary) decision-making, which suits his temperament better than the interpretative reading of micro-reliefs in forests.

== Achievements ==
=== Athletics (Personal Bests) ===
- 1500 m: 3:54.71 (June 20, 2004, Villeneuve-d'Ascq).
- 3000 m: 8:31.21 (May 2004, Halluin).
- 3000 m Steeplechase: 9:01.94 (2004).
- 400 m Hurdles: 60.58 (2004).
- 10 km road: 33:56 (2019, aged 42).

=== Orienteering ===
World Masters Orienteering Championships (WMOC)
Year	Venue	Event	Result	Category	Notes
2023	(Slovakia) Košice	Sprint	(gold) Winner	M45	Time: 12:49
2023	(Slovakia) Košice	Long Distance	8th place	M45	
2025	(Spain) Girona	Sprint	(gold) Winner	M45	Time: 14:40

French National Championships (FFCO)
Year	Event	Result	Category	Notes
2017	Middle Distance	(bronze) 3rd place	H40	
2019	Night	(gold) Winner	H40	Ahead of O. Kotecky
2022	Long Distance	(silver) 2nd place	H45	
2022	Sprint Distance	(silver) 2nd place	H40-45	
2023	Long Distance	(gold) Winner	H45	Ahead of F. Vannier
2023	Sprint Distance	(gold) Winner	H40-45	
2024	Sprint Distance	(gold) Winner	H40-45	
2025	Sprint Distance	(silver) 2nd place	H40-45	

== See also ==
- Orienteering
- University of Lille
