= Laura Hernández =

Laura Hernández may refer to:

- Laura Hernández (handballer) (born 1997), Spanish handball player
- Laura Hernández Guzmán (born 1958), Mexican psychologist
- Laura Hernandez (professor of dairy science), American associate professor of dairy science
