= 2021 European Athletics U23 Championships – Men's 200 metres =

Men's 200 metres at the 2021 European Athletics U23 Championships
- Venue: Kadriorg Stadium, Tallinn
- Dates: 9–10 July
- Competitors: 30 from 19 nations
- Winning time: 20.47

Medalists
gold medal	William Reais	Switzerland
silver medal	Jesús Gómez	Spain
bronze medal	Pol Retamal	Spain

The men's 200 metres event at the 2021 European Athletics U23 Championships was held in Tallinn, Estonia, at Kadriorg Stadium on 9 and 10 July.

== Records ==
Prior to the competition, the records were as follows:

European U23 record	Christophe Lemaitre (FRA)	19.80	Daegu, South Korea	3 September 2011
Championship U23 record	Ján Volko (SVK)	20.33	Bydgoszcz, Poland	15 July 2017

== Results ==
=== Round 1 ===
Qualification rule: First 3 in each heat (Q) and the next 4 fastest (q) advance to the semifinal.

Rank	Heat	Name	Nationality	Time	Notes
1	3	William Reais	Switzerland	20.81	Q
2	3	Jesús Gómez	Spain	20.86	Q
3	1	Pol Retamal	Spain	20.90	Q
4	1	Samuel Purola	Finland	20.99	Q
5	1	Łukasz Żok	Poland	21.01	Q
6	4	Shemar Boldizsar	Great Britain	21.04	Q
7	4	Tomáš Nemejc	Czech Republic	21.05	Q
8	2	Damian Trzaska	Poland	21.12	Q
9	4	Riq de Wit	Netherlands	21.21	Q
10	3	André Prazeres	Portugal	21.24	Q, PB
11	2	Delvis Santos	Portugal	21.24	Q
12	2	Onyema Adigida	Netherlands	21.25	Q
13	1	Alessandro Ori	Italy	21.26	q
14	4	Patryk Wykrota	Poland	21.28	q
15	3	Oğuz Uyar	Turkey	21.29	q
16	4	Gal Arad	Israel	21.33	q
17	2	Francesco Libera	Italy	21.35	
18	2	Tomas Keršulis	Lithuania	21.40	
19	4	Kyrylo Prykhodko	Ukraine	21.43	
20	2	Aleksandrs Kucs	Latvia	21.50	
21	3	Erik Kostrytsya	Ukraine	21.54	
22	1	Venelin Georgiev	Bulgaria	21.55	
23	1	Matevž Šuštaršič	Slovenia	21.60	
24	3	Jan Trafina	Czech Republic	21.63	
25	3	Kasper Kadestål	Sweden	21.66	
26	2	Bradley Lestrade	Switzerland	21.69	
27	1	Ladislav Töpfer	Czech Republic	21.85	
28	4	Jakub Benda	Slovakia	21.98	
29	3	Francesco Sansovini	San Marino	22.07	NU23R
30	2	Senad Ramadani	North Macedonia	22.96	

=== Semifinal ===
Qualification rule: First 3 in each heat (Q) and the next 2 fastest (q) advance to the semifinal.

Rank	Heat	Name	Nationality	Time	Notes
1	1	William Reais	Switzerland	20.57	Q, SB
2	1	Onyema Adigida	Netherlands	20.62	Q, NU23R
3	1	Jesús Gómez	Spain	20.72	Q, PB
4	1	Łukasz Żok	Poland	20.87	q, PB
5	1	Damian Trzaska	Poland	20.95	q, PB
6	1	Gal Arad	Israel	21.01	PB
7	2	Samuel Purola	Finland	21.27	Q
8	2	Shemar Boldizsar	Great Britain	21.28	Q
9	2	Pol Retamal	Spain	21.35	Q
10	1	Alessandro Ori	Italy	21.35	
11	2	Tomáš Nemejc	Czech Republic	21.42	
12	2	Riq de Wit	Netherlands	21.49	
13	2	Patryk Wykrota	Poland	21.69	
14	2	Oğuz Uyar	Turkey	21.82	
15	2	André Prazeres	Portugal	21.83	
	1	Delvis Santos	Portugal	DQ	

=== Final ===
Wind: +0.3 m/s

Rank	Lane	Name	Nationality	Time	Notes
1st place, gold medalist(s)	3	William Reais	Switzerland	20.47	EU23L
2nd place, silver medalist(s)	7	Jesús Gómez	Spain	20.60	PB
3rd place, bronze medalist(s)	8	Pol Retamal	Spain	20.76	
4	5	Samuel Purola	Finland	20.81	
5	6	Onyema Agidiga	Netherlands	20.84	
6	4	Shemar Boldizsar	Great Britain	20.84	
7	1	Łukasz Żok	Poland	20.95	
8	2	Damian Trzaska	Poland	21.09	
