= Marily dos Santos =

Brazilian marathon runner

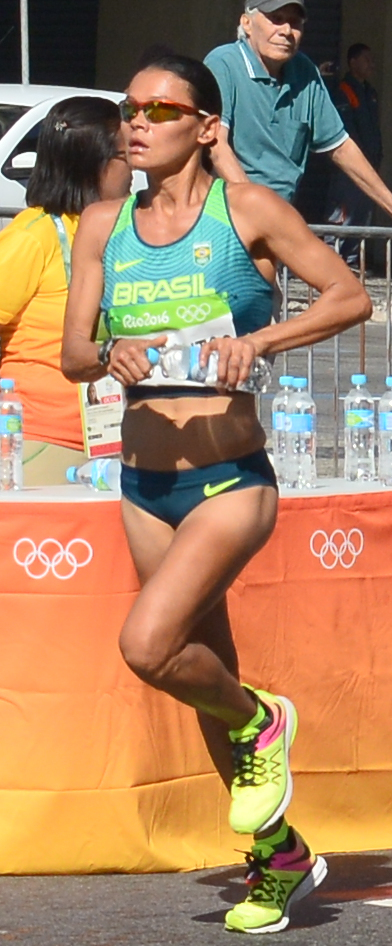
- Dos Santos at the 2016 Olympics

Personal information
- Nationality: Brazil
- Born: 5 February 1978 (age 48) Joaquim Gomes, Alagoas, Brazil
- Height: 1.56 m (5 ft 1 1/2 in)
- Weight: 47 kg (104 lb)

Sport
- Sport: Athletics
- Event: Marathon
- Coached by: Gilmario Mendes (husband)

Achievements and titles
- Personal bests: Half-marathon: 1:17:10 (2003); Marathon: 2:31:55 (2012)

Marily dos Santos (born 5 February 1978) is a Brazilian marathon runner. Aged 30 she made her Olympic debut, placing 51st in the 2008 Olympic marathon in a time of 2:38:10. She finished fifth at the 2015 Pan American Games and 78th at the 2016 Rio Olympics.

In professional competition, she was the 2012 winner at the Maratona di Sant'Antonio in Italy. She has won numerous road running competitions in Brazil, with highlights including the 2007 Rio de Janeiro Marathon, the 2008 Brasilia Half Marathon and two victories at the Corrida de São Sebastião.

She has also competed in cross country running and was the short race bronze medallist at the 2002 South American Cross Country Championships and sixth placer and team title winner at the 2005 South American Cross Country Championships. She represented Brazil at the 2003 IAAF World Half Marathon Championships.

== Personal life ==
Dos Santos is coached by her husband Gilmario Mendes. Her cousin José Santana placed second in the marathon at the 1991 Pan American Games.
