= William Reais =

Swiss sprinter (born 1999)

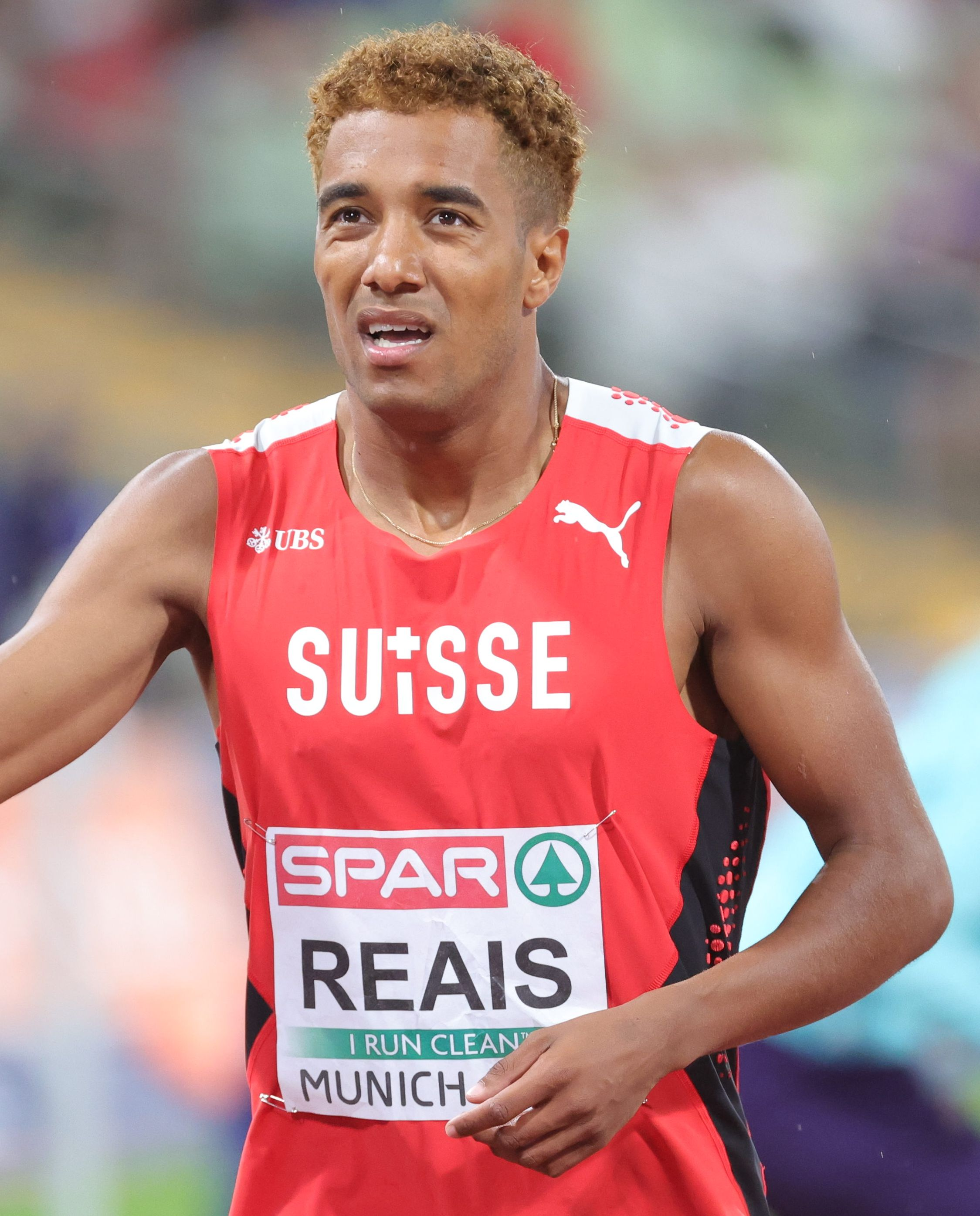
- Reais in 2022

Personal information
- Full name: William Jeff Reais
- Born: 4 May 1999 (age 27)
- Height: 185 cm (6 ft 1 in)

Sport
- Country: Switzerland
- Sport: Athletics
- Events: 200 metres, 400 metres
- Club: LC Zürich
- Coached by: Florian Clivaz; Patrick Saile
Medal record
Representing Switzerland
European Championships
Bronze medal – third place	2024 Rome	200 m
European U23 Championships
Gold medal – first place	2021 Tallinn	200 m

William Reais (born 4 May 1999) is a Swiss sprinter competing primarily in the 200 metres. He competed in the 200 metres at the 2020 Summer Olympics. He also holds the Swiss national indoor record for the same event.

== Personal life ==
Reais was born in Switzerland to parents of Angolan and Portuguese descent.

== Achievements ==
Information from his World Athletics profile unless otherwise noted.

=== Personal bests ===
Outdoor

- 100 metres – 10.35 (La Chaux-de-Fonds 2020)
- 200 metres – 20.24 (Basel 2020)
- 400 metres – 46.39 (Bellinzona 2020)

Indoor

- 60 metres – 6.66 (Magglingen 2021)
- 200 metres – 20.97 (Magglingen 2021) NR

=== International competitions ===
Year	Competition	Venue	Position	Event	Time	Notes
Representing Switzerland
2018	World U20 Championships	Tampere, Finland	21st (sf)	200 m	21.51	
2018	World U20 Championships	Tampere, Finland	9th (h)	4 × 400 m relay	3:09.48	NJR
2019	European U23 Championships	Gävle, Sweden	4th (sf)	200 m	21.47	
2019	European Team Championships Super League	Bydgoszcz, Poland	10th (h)	200 m	21.32	
2019	European Team Championships Super League	Bydgoszcz, Poland	8th	4 × 100 m relay	39.88	
2021	European U23 Championships	Tallinn, Estonia	1st	200 m	20.47	
2021	Olympic Games	Tokyo, Japan	17th (sf)	200 m	20.44	SB
2022	World Championships	Eugene, OR, United States	32nd	200 m	20.71	SB
2022	European Championships	Munich, Germany	18th (sf)	200 m	20.82	
2022	European Championships	Munich, Germany	5th	4 × 100 m relay	38.36	NR
2023	World Championships	Budapest, Hungary	21st (sf)	200 m	20.67	
2024	European Championships	Rome, Italy	14th (sf)	100 m	10.32	SB
2024	European Championships	Rome, Italy	3rd	200 m	20.47	
2024	European Championships	Rome, Italy	5th	4 × 100 m relay	38.68	
2024	Olympic Games	Paris, France	39th (h)	200 m	20.92	
2025	European Indoor Championships	Apeldoorn, Netherlands	16th (sf)	60 m	6.70	
2025	World Indoor Championships	Nanjing, China	23rd (sf)	60 m	6.72	
2025	World Championships	Tokyo, Japan	21st (sf)	200 m	20.59	
2026	European Championships	Birmingham, United Kingdom	8th	200 m	20.63 (w)	

=== Circuit wins and titles ===
- IAAF World Challenge Meeting
  - 2023: Ostrava Golden Spike (4 × 100 m relay)

=== National titles ===
- Swiss Athletics Championships
  - 100 metres: 2023
  - 200 metres: 2020, 2022, 2023
- Swiss Indoor Athletics Championships
  - 200 metres: 2018, 2019, 2020, 2021
- Swiss U23 Championships
  - 100 metres: 2021
  - 400 metres: 2020
- Swiss U20 Championships
  - 200 metres: 2017, 2018
- Swiss U20 Indoor Championships
  - 60 metres: 2018
  - 200 metres: 2018
- Swiss U18 Championships
  - 100 metres: 2016

== See also ==
- List of Swiss records in athletics
- Switzerland at the Olympics
