= 2018 Dutch Indoor Athletics Championships =

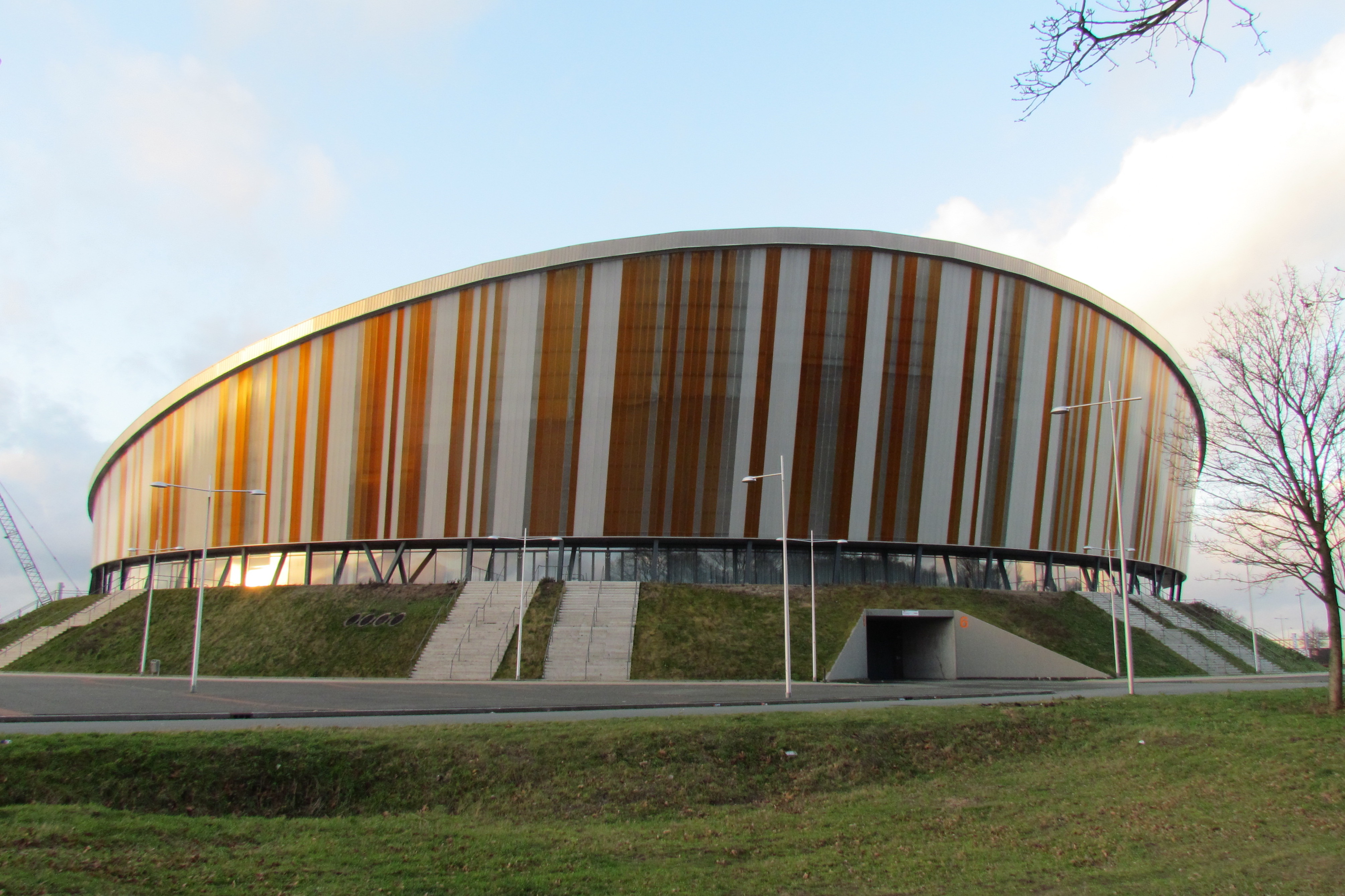
- The host stadium
- Dates: 17–18 February
- Host city: Apeldoorn
- Venue: Omnisport Apeldoorn
- Events: 24

The 2018 Dutch Indoor Athletics Championships (Dutch: Nederlandse kampioenschappen indooratletiek 2018) was the 47th edition of the national championship in indoor track and field for the Netherlands. It was held on 17–18 February at the Omnisport Apeldoorn in Apeldoorn. A total of 24 events (divided evenly between the sexes) were contested over the two-day competition.

== Results ==
=== Men ===
Event	Gold		Silver		Bronze	
60 metres	Chris Garia	6.70	Churandy Martina	6.70	Joris van Gool	6.70
200 metres	Liemarvin Bonevacia	21.09	Onyema Adigida	21.27	Sander Pupella	21.65
400 metres	Tony van Diepen	46.99	Nick Smidt	47.65	Jesper Arts	47.93
800 metres	Thomas van Laar	1:51.66	Jaap Gerben Vellinga	1:52.10	Lars van Hoeven	1:52.52
1500 metres	Valentijn Weinans	3:54.37	Bram Anderiessen	3:54.80	Niek Blikslager	3:57.00
3000 metres	Benjamin de Haan	8:07.43	Mahadi Abdi Ali	8:09.13	Frank Futselaar	8:11.10
60 m hurdles	Koen Smet	7.68	Liam van der Schaaf	7.93	Dave Wesselink	8.10
Long jump	Pieter Braun	7.47 m	Fabian Florant	7.44 m	Pim Jehee	7.27 m
Triple jump	Fabian Florant	16.00 m	Tarik Tahiri	15.11 m	Joshua Record	14.40 m
High jump	Douwe Amels	2.21 m	Dion van Kessel	2.12 m	Marius Wouters	2.09 m
Pole vault	Koen van der Wijst	5.43 m	Menno Vloon	5.33 m	Eelco Sintnicolaas	5.28 m
Shot put	Patrick Cronie	18.70 m	Erik Cadée	18.31 m	Mathijs Damsteegt	17.71 m

=== Women ===
Event	Gold		Silver		Bronze	
60 metres	Dafne Schippers	7.09	Jamile Samuel	7.17	Naomi Sedney	7.22
200 metres	Zoë Sedney	24.19	Leonie van Vliet	24.60	Gabriëlla van der Wijck	25.26
400 metres	Madiea Ghafoor	52.21	Nicky van Leuveren	53.27	Laura de Witte	53.63
800 metres	Danaïd Prinsen	2:04.18	Sanne Verstegen	2:04.63	Suzanne Voorrips	2:06.41
1500 metres	Sanne Verstegen	4:18.58	Dagmar Smid	4:24.58	Lotte Krause	4:26.10
3000 metres	Lotte Krause	9:54.55	Elisa de Jong	10:02.70	Ellen Jansen	10:08.39
60 m hurdles	Nadine Visser	8.03	Eefje Boons	8.21	Anouk Vetter	8.31
Long jump	Carlijn ter Laak	6.12 m	Tara Yoro	6.02 m	Joyce Schumacher	5.90 m
Triple jump	Patricia Krolis	12.63 m	Maureen Herremans	12.33 m	Meruska Eduarda	12.26 m
High jump	Nikki May Woudstra	1.79 m	Marlies van Haaren	1.76 m	Tanita Hofmans	1.76 m
Pole vault	Femke Pluim	4.45 m	Robin Wingbermühle	4.20 m	Kiliana Heymans	4.10 m
Shot put	Melissa Boekelman	17.34 m	Jorinde van Klinken	16.43 m	Jessica Schilder	16.03 m
