= Jona Efoloko =

British/Congolese sprinter (born 1999)

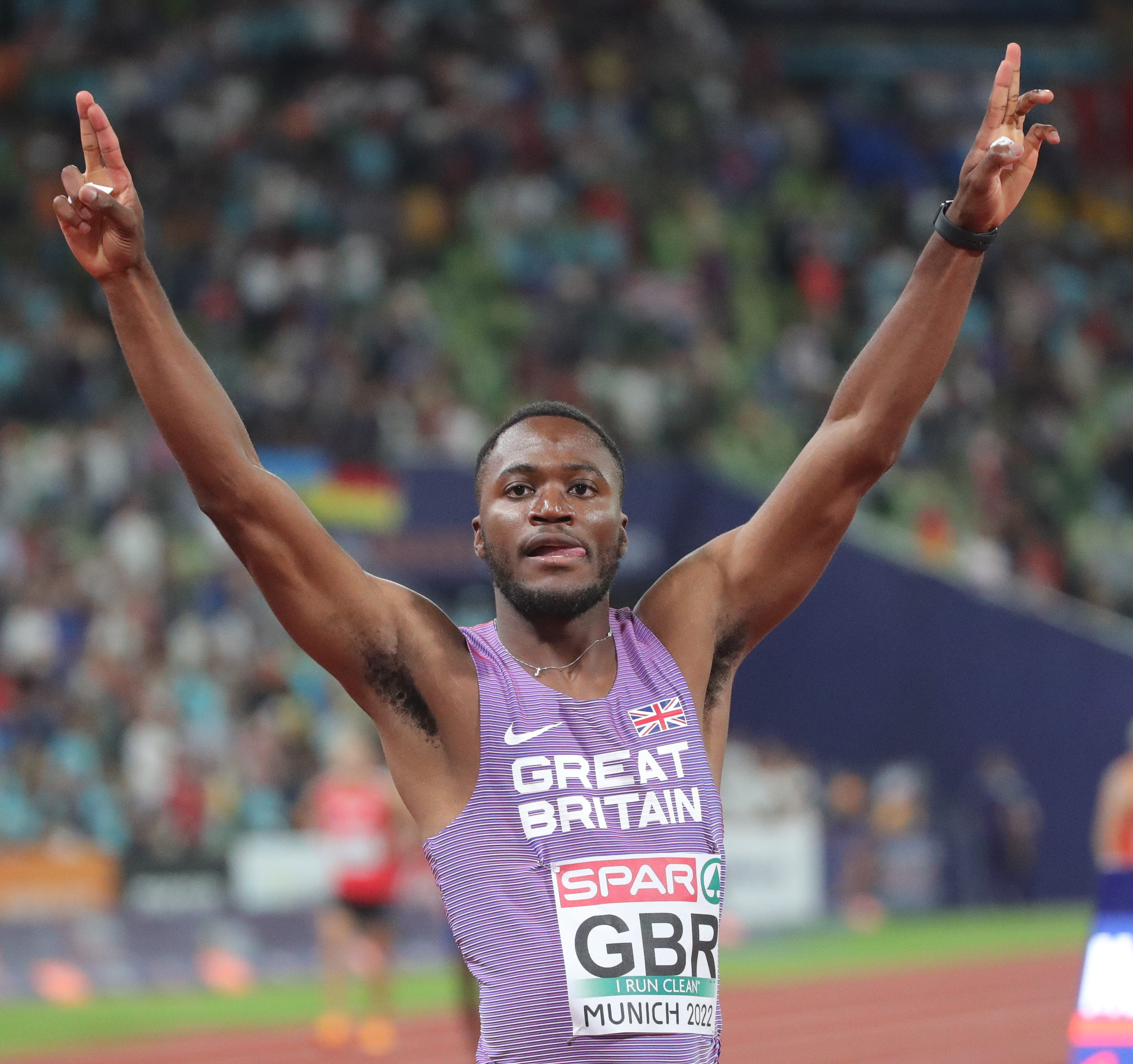
- 2022 in Munich

Personal information
- Nationality: British/Congolese
- Born: 23 September 1999 (age 26) Kinshasa, DR Congo

Sport
- Sport: Track and Field
- Events: 100 metres, 200 metres
- Club: Sale Harriers

Achievements and titles
- Personal bests: 60 m: 6.63 (London, 2023); 100 m: 10.21 (Clermont, 2024); 200 m: 20.42 (Birmingham, 2025)
Medal record
Men's athletics
Representing Great Britain
World Championships
Bronze medal – third place	2022 Eugene	4 × 100 m relay
European Championships
Gold medal – first place	2022 Munich	4 × 100 m relay
World U20 Championships
Gold medal – first place	2018 Tampere	200 m
European U20 Championships
Silver medal – second place	2017 Grosseto	200 m
European Youth Championships
Gold medal – first place	2016 Tbilisi	200 m
Representing England
Commonwealth Games
Gold medal – first place	2022 Birmingham	4 × 100 m relay

Jona Efoloko (born 23 September 1999) is a British/Congolese sprinter. A former European youth (U18) and World Junior (U20) champion in 200 metres, In 2022, he was part of the Great Britain relay team that won European and Commonwealth gold, and World Championship bronze, in the men's 4 × 100 metres relay.

== Early life ==
Efokolo was born in Kinshasa in the Democratic Republic of Congo before relocating to Britain, where he became a member of the Manchester Sale Harriers. He studied at the University of East London.

== Biography ==
He won the European U18 Championships 200 m in 2016 and won silver in the same event in 2017. He won the 200 m title at the 2018 IAAF World Junior Championships in Tampere, setting his personal best in 20.48.

He won medals in three senior 4 × 100 m relay competitions in 2022, winning gold for England at his home Commonwealth Games in Birmingham, gold for Britain at the European Championships in Munich and bronze at the 2022 World Athletics Championships in Eugene, Oregon.

He was chosen to represent Great Britain at the 2023 World Athletics Championships in Budapest in August 2023.

In April 2024, he set new personal best times of 10.21 seconds for the 100 metres, and 20.44 seconds for the 200 metres, in Clermont, Florida. That month, he was selected as part of the British team for the 2024 World Athletics Relays in Nassau, Bahamas. In May 2024, he was selected to run the 200 metres and 4 × 100 m relay for Britain at the 2024 European Athletics Championships in Rome.

He was named in the British team for the 2025 World Athletics Relays in Guangzhou. He ran in the men's 4 × 100 metres relay, alongside Nethaneel Mitchell-Blake , Romell Glave and Eugene Amo-Dadzie as the British quartet won their heat to qualify for the final and secure a place for Britain at the 2025 World Championships. He was selected for the 4 x 100 metres relay at the 2025 European Athletics Team Championships in Madrid in June 2025, helping the British men's 4 x 100 metres team to a third-place finish.

On 3 August 2025, he placed second in the final of the 200 metres at the 2025 UK Athletics Championships in Birmingham in a personal best time of 20.42 seconds. In September 2025, he competed in the men's 4 x 100 metres at the 2025 World Championships in Tokyo, Japan.

Efoloko was a finalist in the 60 metres at the 2026 British Indoor Athletics Championships in Birmingham, on 14 February 2026, placing fifth overall.

Efoloko was named in the British squad for the 4 x 100 metres relay at the 2026 World Athletics Relays in Gaborone, Botswana. He competed in the mixed 4 × 100 m relay as the team qualified for the 2027 World Athletics Championships. He was selected to represent England at the 2026 Commonwealth Games in Glasgow.
