= Víctor Aravena =

Chilean long-distance runner

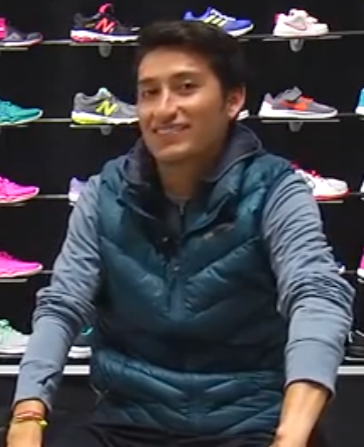
- In a 2015 interview

Personal information
- Full name: Víctor Aravena Pincheira
- Born: 5 February 1990 (age 36) Coronel, Bío Bío, Chile
- Height: 1.60 m (5 ft 3 in)
- Weight: 60 kg (132 lb)

Sport
- Country: Chile
- Sport: Athletics
- Event: Long-distance running
Medal record
Pan American Games
Bronze medal – third place	2015 Toronto	5,000 m
South American Games
Gold medal – first place	2014 Santiago	5,000 m
South American Championships
Gold medal – first place	2017 Asunción	5,000 m
Gold medal – first place	2015 Lima	5,000 m
Silver medal – second place	2013 Cartagena	5,000 m
Silver medal – second place	2011 Buenos Aires	5,000 m
- Updated on 12 June 2018

Víctor Aravena Pincheira (born 5 February 1990 in Coronel, Chile) is a Chilean athlete competing mostly in the long-distance running events.

== Personal bests ==
- 3000 m: 7:59.91 min – (Chile) Concepción, 12 May 2012
- 5000 m: 13:46.94 min – (Canada) Toronto, 25 July 2015
- 10,000 m: 28:49.89 min – (Chile) Concepción, 25 May 2013
- Half marathon: 1:05:01 hrs – (Chile) Temuco, 27 February 2011
- Marathon: 2:16:20 hrs – (Chile) Temuco, 20 March 2016

== Competition record ==
Year	Competition	Venue	Position	Event	Notes
Representing Chile
2005	South American Cross Country Championships (U18)	Montevideo, Uruguay	4th	4 km	13:18
2005	South American Junior Championships	Rosario, Argentina	3rd	5000 m	15:08.21
2006	South American Cross Country Championships (U18)	Mar del Plata, Argentina	1st	4 km	12:01
2006	South American Youth Championships	Caracas, Venezuela	2nd	3000 m	8:43.81
2007	South American Cross Country Championships (U18)	Rio de Janeiro, Brazil	1st	4 km	12:43
2007	World Youth Championships	Ostrava, Czech Republic	10th	3000 m	8:31.54
2008	World Cross Country Championships	Edinburgh, United Kingdom	97th	7.905 km	26:15
2008	World Junior Championships	Bydgoszcz, Poland	–	10,000m	DNF
2009	South American Cross Country Championships (U20)	Coronel, Chile	1st	8 km	25:09
2009	South American Junior Championships	São Paulo, Brazil	3rd	5000 m	14:45.97
2009	Pan American Junior Championships	Port of Spain, Trinidad and Tobago	4th	5000 m	14:17.89
2009	Pan American Junior Championships	Port of Spain, Trinidad and Tobago	1st	10,000 m	31:01.70 (Note: This performance earned him also the gold medal at the 2009 South American Junior Championships.)
2010	South American U23 Championships	Medellín, Colombia	3rd	5000 m	14:45.85
2010	Ibero-American Championships	San Fernando, Spain	8th	5000 m	14:18.80
2011	South American Cross Country Championships	Asunción, Paraguay	10th	12 km	38:35.7
2011	South American Championships	Buenos Aires, Argentina	2nd	5000 m	13:59.81
2011	Universiade	Shenzhen, China	10th	5000 m	14:16.50
2012	Ibero-American Championships	Barquisimeto, Venezuela	1st	3000 m	8:04.45
2012	South American U23 Championships	São Paulo, Brazil	1st	5000 m	14:16.25
2012	South American U23 Championships	São Paulo, Brazil	1st	10,000 m	30:31.93
2013	South American Championships	Cartagena, Colombia	2nd	5000 m	14:17.97
2014	South American Games	Santiago, Chile	1st	5000 m	14:06.02
2014	South American Games	Santiago, Chile	5th	10,000m	30:15.57
2015	South American Championships	Lima, Peru	1st	5000 m	14:06.14
2015	Pan American Games	Toronto, Canada	3rd	5000 m	13:46.94
2015	World Championships	Beijing, China	36th (h)	5000 m	14:29.34
2017	South American Championships	Asunción, Paraguay	1st	5000 m	13:57.45
2018	South American Games	Cochabamba, Bolivia	6th	5000 m	15:26.85
