= Athletics at the 2010 South American Games – Men's 5,000 metres =

The Men's 5,000m event at the 2010 South American Games was held on March 23 at 17:30.

== Medalists ==
Gold	Silver	Bronze
José Mauricio González; Colombia	Javier Peña; Colombia	Víctor Aravena; Chile

== Records ==
Standing records prior to the 2010 South American Games
World record	Kenenisa Bekele	Ethiopia	12:37.35	Hengelo, Netherlands	31 May 2004
World Leading	Andrew Baddeley	Great Britain	13:20.85	Melbourne, Australia	4 March 2010
South American record	Marilson dos Santos	Brazil	13:19.43	Kassel, Germany	8 June 2006
South American U23 record	Valdenor dos Santos	Brazil	13:36.65	Maia, Portugal	20 July 1991

== Results ==
Results were published.

Rank	Athlete	Nationality	Result	Notes
1st place, gold medalist(s)	José Mauricio González	Colombia	14:23.35	SB
2nd place, silver medalist(s)	Javier Peña	Colombia	14:27.62	PB
3rd place, bronze medalist(s)	Víctor Aravena	Chile	14:45.85	
4	Daniel Chaves da Silva	Brazil	15:11.65	
5	Carlos Aníbal Contreras	Ecuador	15:16.15	
6	Ronaldo do Carmo Rocha	Brazil	15:28.38	
7	Alex Cisneros	Ecuador	15:47.75	
8	Dennis Horatio	Guyana	16:47.19	
–	Wily Canchanya	(Peru) Perú	DNF	

Intermediate times:

1000m	2:49.24	Javier Peña (COL)
2000m	5:41.75	Javier Peña (COL)
3000m	8:36.09	Javier Peña (COL)
4000m	11:34.56	Javier Peña (COL)

== See also ==
- 2010 South American Under-23 Championships in Athletics
