= Rio de Janeiro Marathon =

Annual race in Brazil since 1979

- Date: June
- Location: Rio de Janeiro, Rio de Janeiro, Brazil
- Event type: Road
- Distance: Marathon, half marathon, 10K, 5K
- Established: 1979 (47 years ago)
- Course records: Men's: 2:12:35 (2024) (Kenya) Josphat Kiprotich; Women's: 2:34:33 (2021) (Ethiopia) Kebebush Yisma
- Website: https://www.maratonadorio.com.br

The Rio de Janeiro Marathon is an annual road-based marathon hosted by Rio de Janeiro, Brazil, since 1979. The marathon is a World Athletics Label Road Race and a member of the Association of International Marathons and Distance Races.

During the event, a half marathon, a 10K race, and a 5K race are also offered. Runners are also offered the option of completing the Desafio Cidade Maravilhosa ('wonderful city challenge'), in which one runs both the half marathon on Saturday and the marathon on Sunday. In 2022, 1,400 runners successfully completed the challenge.

The Rio de Janeiro Half Marathon is a separate race that is held in August.

== History ==
The inaugural marathon was held in 1979. It was organized by Brazilian runner Eleonora Mendonça, who later went on to run in the first Olympic women's marathon in 1984. (Note: Mendonça had once been a housemate of U.S. runner Kathrine Switzer, the first woman to run in the Boston Marathon officially.) Mendonça set up the marathon with her company, Printer.

Following the success of the inaugural marathon, the city ended up hosting two marathons during a few years, including in 1980 and 1981, where one was organized by Printer, and the other by Jornal do Brasil.

== Course ==
External image
- Course map of full marathon in 2019

The course for the inaugural marathon started and finished in the stadium of the Army Physical Education School.

In 2019, the route of the marathon was changed to begin and end in Flamengo Park.

== Winners ==
Key: Course record

Edition	Year	Men's winner	Time (min:sec)	Women's winner	Time (h:m:s)
1st	1980	Greg Meyer (USA)	2:16:40	Lorraine Moller (NZL)	2:39:10
2nd	1981	Bill Rodgers (USA)	2:14:13	Lorraine Moller (NZL)	2:35:56
3rd	1982	Delfim Moreira (POR)	2:15:57	Charlotte Teske (GER)	2:38:42
4th	1983	Lawrence Whitty (AUS)	2:18:43	Charlotte Teske (GER)	2:40:13
5th	1984	Elói Schleder (BRA)	2:24:35	Eleonora de Mendonça (BRA)	2:55:54
6th	1985	Ron Tabb (USA)	2:16:15	Patti Catalano (USA)	2:38:44
7th	1986	Elói Schleder (BRA)	2:22:02	Liz Miller (USA)	2:46:54
8th	1987	Osmiro Silva (BRA)	2:15:57	Eliana Reinert (BRA)	2:51:10
9th	1988	José Carlos Santana (BRA)	2:23:38	Nercy da Freitas (BRA)	2:59:56
10th	1989	José Carlos Santana (BRA)	2:18:19	Marinete Quintanilha (BRA)	2:56:54
11th	1990	José Carlos Santana (BRA)	2:17:26	Sônia de Oliveira (BRA)	2:49:31
12th	1991	João Pacau (BRA)	2:18:43	Maria Gomes (BRA)	2:49:59
–	1992	Race was not held			
13th	1993	João Pacau (BRA)	2:20:01	Nercy da Freitas (BRA)	2:54:04
–	1994	Was not held			
–	1995	Was not held			
14th	1996	Elisvaldo de Carvalho (BRA)	2:16:55	Márcia Narloch (BRA)	2:44:55
15th	1997	Elisvaldo de Carvalho (BRA)	2:19:39	Luciene Soares (BRA)	2:49:34
16th	1998	André Luiz Ramos (BRA)	2:13:52	Viviane de Oliveira (BRA)	2:39:49
17th	1999	Lindemberg Gomes (BRA)	2:24:28	Edivânia da Silva (BRA)	2:50:15
18th	2000	Reginaldo dos Santos (BRA)	2:18:01	Rizoneide Vanderlei (BRA)	2:43:53
–	2001	Was not held			
–	2002	Was not held			
19th	2003	Alex Januário (BRA)	2:16:39	Leone Justino (BRA)	2:46:54
20th	2004	Francisco Armendes (BRA)	2:20:48	Raimunda Brito (BRA)	2:57:36
21st	2005	Cláudio Sebastião Pereira (BRA)	2:21:18	Denise Paiva (BRA)	2:50:01
22nd	2006	José Pereira (BRA)	2:21:14	Leone Justino (BRA)	2:49:58
23rd	2007	Elson Gracioli (BRA)	2:18:31	Marily dos Santos (BRA)	2:42:18
24th	2008	Domingos Nonato (BRA)	2:17:20	Iliane Wandscheer (BRA)	2:49:00
25th	2009	Marcos Antônio Pereira (BRA)	2:17:11	Marizete de Paula (BRA)	2:42:46
26th	2010	Anderson Chirchir (KEN)	2:19:54	Sirlene Sousa (BRA)	2:43:15
27th	2011	Patrick Tambwé (FRA)	2:18:17	Kim Kum-ok (PRK)	2:35:22
28th	2012	Willy Kangogo (KEN)	2:15:01	Tabitha Kibet (KEN)	2:34:41
29th	2013	Giomar da Silva (BRA)	2:18:02	Letay Negash (ETH)	2:40:18
30th	2014	Edmílson dos Reis (BRA)	2:17:12	Edna Mukwana (KEN)	2:40:32
31st	2015	Willy Kangogo (BRA)	2:14:21	Caroline Komen (KEN)	2:37:46
32nd	2016	Elijah Kemboi (KEN)	2:17:05	Priscilla Lorchima (KEN)	2:41:23
33th	2017	Godfrey Kosgei (KEN)	2:17:41	Edna Mukwana (KEN)	2:38:30
34th	2018	Alem Niguse (ETH)	2:18:41	Zinash Banetirga (ETH)	2:41:40
35th	2019	Giovani dos Santos (BRA)	2:18:48	Cristiane Alves (BRA)	2:50:23
36th	2021	Justino Pedro da Silva (BRA)	2:13:31	Mirela Saturnino (BRA)	2:44:51
37th	2022	Justino Pedro da Silva (BRA)	2:16:02	Kebebush Yisma (ETH)	2:34:33
38th	2023	Josphat Kiprotich (KEN)	2:13:29	Zinash Debebe (ETH)	2:36:00
39th	2024	Josphat Kiprotich (KEN)	2:12:35	Betelhem Moges (ETH)	2:39:53

=== Wins by country ===
Country	Men's	Women's	Total
Brazil	26	22	48
Kenya	6	5	11
Ethiopia	1	5	6
United States	3	2	5
Germany	0	2	2
New Zealand	0	2	2
Australia	1	0	1
France	1	0	1
North Korea	0	1	1
Portugal	1	0	1

== See also ==
- Athletics at the 2016 Summer Olympics – Men's marathon
- Athletics at the 2016 Summer Olympics – Women's marathon
- São Paulo International Marathon
- Saint Silvester Road Race
