= 2022 European Athletics Championships – Men's 200 metres =

Men's 200 metres at the 2022 European Athletics Championships
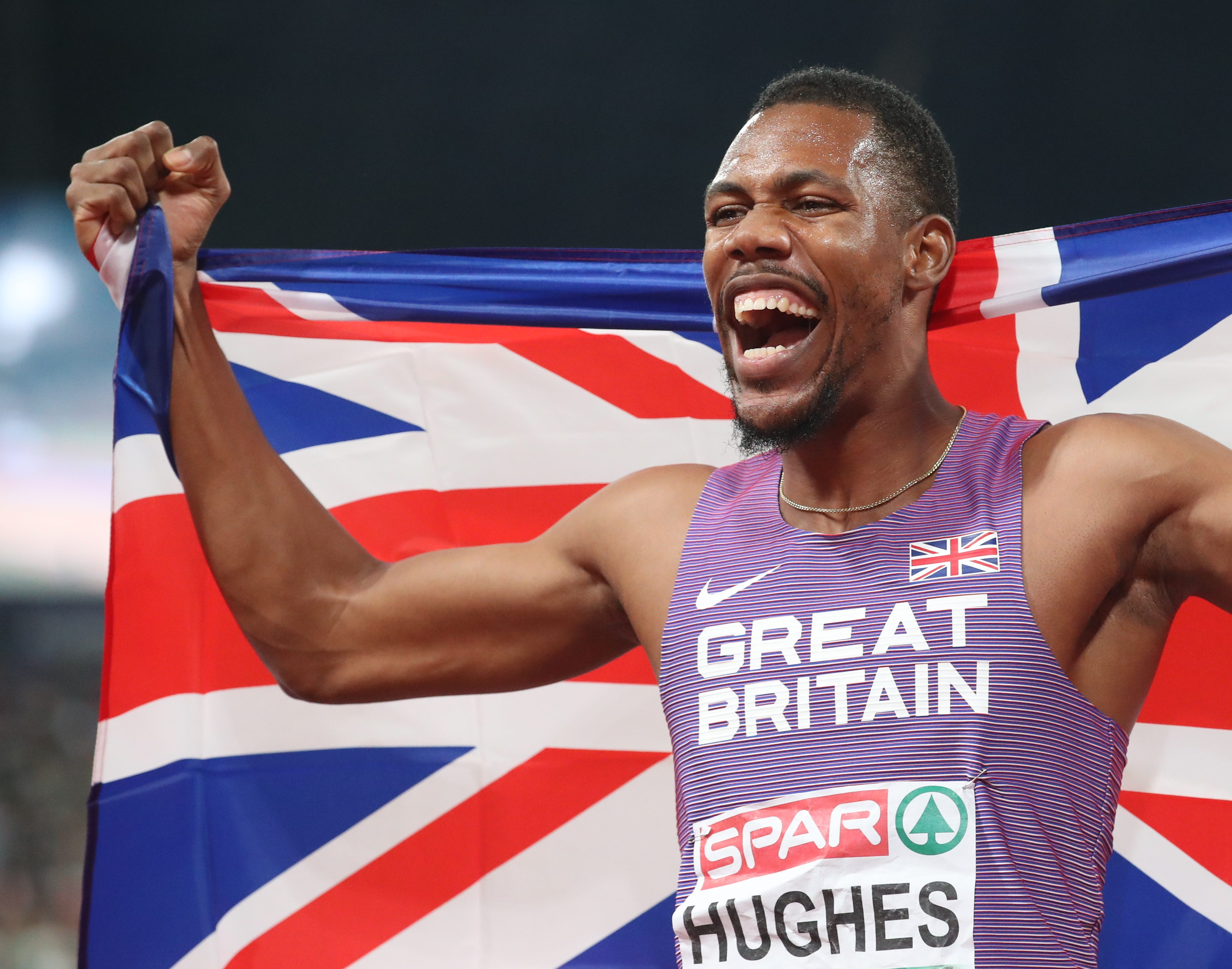
- Venue: Olympiastadion
- Location: Munich
- Dates: 18 August (round 1 and semifinals); 19 August (final)
- Competitors: 35 from 21 nations
- Winning time: 20.07

Medalists
gold medal	Zharnel Hughes	Great Britain
silver medal	Nethaneel Mitchell-Blake	Great Britain
bronze medal	Filippo Tortu	Italy

The men's 200 metres at the 2022 European Athletics Championships took place at the Olympiastadion on 18 and 19 August.

== Records ==
Standing records prior to the 2022 European Athletics Championships
World record	Usain Bolt (JAM)	19.19	Berlin, Germany	20 August 2009
European record	Pietro Mennea (ITA)	19.72	Mexico City, Mexico	12 September 1979
Championship record	Ramil Guliyev (TUR)	19.76	Berlin, Germany	9 August 2018
World Leading	Noah Lyles (USA)	19.31	Eugene, Oregon, United States	21 July 2022
Europe Leading	Blessing Afrifah (ISR)	19.96	Cali, Colombia	4 August 2022

== Schedule ==
Date	Time	Round
18 August 2022	12:30	Round 1
18 August 2022	20:13	Semifinals
19 August 2022	21:20	Final

All times are local times (UTC+2)

== Results ==
=== Round 1 ===
First 3 in each heat (Q) and the next 3 fastest (q) advance to the Semifinals. The 12 highest ranked athletes received a bye into the semi-finals.

==== Heat 1 ====
Rank	Lane	Athlete	Nation	Time	Notes
1	8	Taymir Burnet	Netherlands	20.48	Q
2	6	Łukasz Żok	Poland	20.78	Q
3	5	Jan Jirka	Czech Republic	20.84	Q
4	7	Mathias Hove Johansen	Norway	20.89	
5	2	Robin Vanderbemden	Belgium	20.90	
6	3	Panayiotis Trivizas	Greece	21.00	
7	4	Marcus Lawler	Ireland	21.10	
8	1	Robin Erewa	Germany	21.12	
				Wind: -1.0 m/s	

==== Heat 2 ====
Rank	Lane	Athlete	Nation	Time	Notes
1	8	Eseosa Desalu	Italy	20.46	Q, SB
2	2	William Reais	Switzerland	20.66	Q, SB
3	4	Gediminas Truskauskas	Lithuania	20.67	Q
4	3	Samuel Purola	Finland	20.77	q
5	6	Tazana Kamanga-Dyrbak	Denmark	20.88	
6	1	Tamás Máté	Hungary	20.94	
7	5	Eduard Kubelík	Czech Republic	21.25	
8	7	Jerai Torres	Gibraltar	22.70	
				Wind: -0.6 m/s	

==== Heat 3 ====
Rank	Lane	Athlete	Nation	Time	Notes
1	8	Ján Volko	Slovakia	20.48	Q, SB
2	5	Diego Aldo Pettorossi	Italy	20.65	Q
3	4	Daniel Rodríguez	Spain	20.80	Q
4	3	Patryk Wykrota	Poland	20.81	q
5	6	Simon Hansen	Denmark	20.81	q
6	2	Felix Svensson	Switzerland	20.90	
7	7	Jiří Polák	Czech Republic	20.94	
				Wind: +0.3 m/s	

=== Semi-finals ===
The twelve qualifiers from round 1 are joined by the twelve highest ranked athletes who received a bye.

First 2 in each semifinal (Q) and the next 2 fastest (q) advance to the Final.

==== Heat 1 ====
Rank	Lane	Athlete	Nation	Time	Notes
1	5	Zharnel Hughes	Great Britain	20.19	Q
2	6	Joshua Hartmann	Germany	20.33	Q, PB
3	4	Blessing Afrifah	Israel	20.34	q
4	8	Eseosa Desalu	Italy	20.48	
5	2	Jan Jirka	Czech Republic	20.80	
6	3	Mouhamadou Fall	France	20.83	
7	1	Łukasz Żok	Poland	20.93	
–	7	Simon Hansen	Denmark	DNS	
				Wind: 0.0 m/s	

==== Heat 2 ====
Rank	Lane	Athlete	Nation	Time	Notes
1	4	Charlie Dobson	Great Britain	20.21	Q
2	6	Ramil Guliyev	Turkey	20.44	Q
3	5	Méba-Mickaël Zeze	France	20.47	
4	3	Owen Ansah	Germany	20.48	
5	7	Diego Aldo Pettorossi	Italy	20.75	
6	1	Daniel Rodríguez	Spain	20.75	
7	8	Samuel Purola	Finland	20.83	
8	2	Gediminas Truskauskas	Lithuania	21.05	
				Wind: +0.4 m/s	

==== Heat 3 ====
Rank	Lane	Athlete	Nation	Time	Notes
1	5	Filippo Tortu	Italy	20.29	Q
2	4	Nethaneel Mitchell-Blake	Great Britain	20.34	Q
3	6	Pol Retamal	Spain	20.38	q
4	8	Ján Volko	Slovakia	20.39	SB
5	7	Taymir Burnet	Netherlands	20.44	SB
6	3	Ryan Zeze	France	20.58	
7	2	William Reais	Switzerland	20.82	
8	1	Patryk Wykrota	Poland	22.84	
				Wind: -0.1 m/s	

=== Final ===
Olympiastadion - 19 Aug - 21:20

Rank	Lane	Athlete	Nation	Time	Notes
1st place, gold medalist(s)	3	Zharnel Hughes	Great Britain	20.07	SB
2nd place, silver medalist(s)	7	Nethaneel Mitchell-Blake	Great Britain	20.17	
3rd place, bronze medalist(s)	6	Filippo Tortu	Italy	20.27	
4	5	Charlie Dobson	Great Britain	20.34	
5	4	Joshua Hartmann	Germany	20.50	
6	2	Pol Retamal	Spain	20.63	
7	1	Blessing Afrifah	Israel	20.69	
–	8	Ramil Guliyev	Turkey	DNF	
				Wind: -0.3 m/s	
