= 2008 World Junior Championships in Athletics – Men's 10,000 metres =

The men's 10,000 metres event at the 2008 World Junior Championships in Athletics was held in Bydgoszcz, Poland, at Zawisza Stadium on 9 July.

== Medalists ==
Gold	Josphat Bett Kipkoech; Kenya
Silver	Titus Mbishei; Kenya
Bronze	Ibrahim Jeylan; Ethiopia

== Results ==
=== Final ===
9 July

Rank	Name	Nationality	Time	Notes
1st place, gold medalist(s)	Josphat Bett Kipkoech	Kenya	27:30.85	
2nd place, silver medalist(s)	Titus Mbishei	Kenya	27:31.65	
3rd place, bronze medalist(s)	Ibrahim Jeylan	Ethiopia	28:07.98	
4	Humegaw Mesfin	Ethiopia	28:08.58	
5	Stephen Kiprotich	Uganda	28:10.71	
6	Yousef Nasir	Morocco	29:19.85	
7	Ryuji Kashiwabara	Japan	29:31.52	
8	Houssem Rouabhi	Algeria	29:58.19	
9	Mohammad Ahmed	Canada	30:03.53	
10	Vedat Günen	Turkey	30:03.87	
11	Nyial Majock	Canada	30:13.42	
12	Robert Krebs	Germany	30:19.66	
13	Guillem Durán	Spain	30:23.79	
14	Daniel Mateo	Spain	30:26.20	
15	Mikael Ekvall	Sweden	30:30.69	
16	Simon Laurent	France	30:43.60	
17	Donald Cabral	United States	30:47.55	
18	Damian Kabat	Poland	30:49.95	
19	Daniel Dunbar	United States	30:51.67	
20	Yusuke Mita	Japan	31:22.45	
	Bentamra Boucherit	Algeria	DNF	
	Víctor Aravena	Chile	DNF	

== Participation ==
According to an unofficial count, 22 athletes from 15 countries participated in the event.

- Algeria (2)
- Canada (2)
- Chile (1)
- Ethiopia (2)
- France (1)
- Germany (1)
- Japan (2)
- Kenya (2)
- Morocco (1)
- Poland (1)
- Spain (2)
- Sweden (1)
- Turkey (1)
- Uganda (1)
- United States (2)
