= St Benedict's Catholic College =

Location
- Norman Way; Colchester, Essex, CO3 3US; England; 51.88517°N 0.87525°E

Information
- Type: Voluntary aided school
- Motto: Ora et labora (Pray and work)
- Religious affiliation: Roman Catholic
- Established: 1963
- Local authority: Essex
- Department for Education URN: 115382 Tables
- Ofsted: Reports
- Head teacher: Joanne Santinelli
- Gender: Coeducational
- Age: 11 to 16
- Enrolment: 878
- Colours: Blue and gold
- Website: www.stbenedicts.essex.sch.uk

St Benedict's Catholic College is a coeducational secondary school in Colchester, Essex, England. As the only remaining Catholic secondary school in Colchester, it is one of the top performing non-selective state schools in Colchester.

== History ==
St Benedict's Roman Catholic Secondary School opened in 1963 as a voluntary aided secondary modern. It became comprehensive in 1976 when the tripartite system was scrapped. In 1999 it reverted to voluntary aided status. The school's first female headteacher Mrs Jo Santinelli, the incumbent, was appointed prior to the 2012–13 academic year.

== Subjects ==
The range of subjects taught at St Benedict's is broad. There is the traditional English, Mathematics and Science (split into Physics, Chemistry and Biology at the beginning of Year 9). St Benedict's is known as a Business and Languages College, meaning that the students have the option to be taught business skills from Year 9 upwards. The only language currently taught is French and is mandatory for most students (apart from some exceptions of students with difficulties with traditional subjects, replacing French with extra English, maths and/or science lessons) from year 7 until year 11, being mandatory to take the French GCSE.

As the school is a Catholic College, religious education is included in the timetable and mandatory. During these lessons, students not only learn more about Christianity, but about other religions too, Judaism for example is part of the Year 8 curriculum. History and Geography are also included as optional choice subjects as well as occasional mandatory PSHE lessons. Computer Science (Information Technology) is also taught with three computer suites and many computers available in the Library. PE (Physical Education) and Technology are also taught.

== Facilities ==
The school is equipped with computer labs and a well-stocked library. There are six science laboratories with equipment for all experiments. The Technology classrooms are also well equipped. Since receiving Business and Enterprise College specialist status, the extra funding was used to add a new business studies suite.

The PE department has had a new block built with updated changing rooms (male and female) and a new gymnasium. There are two gymnasiums, a running track, long jump, two rounders pitches, tennis courts, netball courts, indoor and outdoor basketball courts and a rugby pitch as well as equipment to do high jump and indoor sports such as basketball, badminton, gymnastics, dance, table tennis (indoors and outdoors) as well as new outside gym equipment available for use during break and lunch time.

There is also a newer geography/business building that is separate from the two main buildings built in 2020–2021.

== Notable former pupils ==
- Dermot O'Leary, television and radio presenter
- Tristan Nydam, professional footballer
- Elkan Baggot, professional footballer
- Charlie Dobson, athlete
