= Alejandro de los Santos =

Argentine footballer (1902–1982)

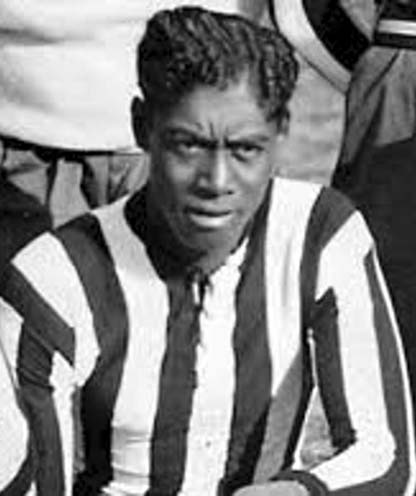

Personal information
- Full name: Alejandro Nicolás de los Santos
- Date of birth: 17 May 1902
- Place of birth: Paraná, Argentina
- Date of death: 16 February 1982 (aged 79)
- Place of death: Buenos Aires, Argentina
- Position: Forward

Youth career
- 1914–1920: Club Oriente del Sud

Senior career*
Years	Team	Apps	(Gls)
1921	San Lorenzo	10	(2)
1921–1924	Dock Sud		
1924–1931	El Porvenir	148	(80)
1931–1934	Huracán	73	(21)

International career
1922–1925	Argentina	5	(0)

Managerial career
- 1935: Huracán
- 1940: Huracán
- 1945: Huracán
Medal record
Representing Argentina
Winner	South American Championship	1925
- * Club domestic league appearances and goals

Alejandro Nicolás de los Santos (17 May 1902 – 16 February 1982) was an Argentine footballer who played as a forward for San Lorenzo, Dock Sud, El Porvenir, Huracán and Argentina.

== Early life ==
De los Santos was born in Paraná on 17 May 1902. According to Argentine historian Francisco Sosa, who was interested in his family origins, he was not the son of a couple of runaway slaves from Angola, as is commonly believed, but rather the son of Argentines, being his father also born in Paraná and his mother born in Río Cuarto, Córdoba. Per Sosa's research, De los Santos was a descendant of Africans who arrived in the Río de la Plata as a result of the slave trade.

== Career ==
In 1921, de los Santos signed for San Lorenzo. On 22 May 1921, de los Santos made his debut for the club in a 2–0 win against Banfield. After spells at Dock Sud and El Porvenir, de los Santos signed for Huracán in 1931, scoring 21 goals in 73 league appearances, making a total of 25 goals in 88 appearances in all competitions.

In December 1925, de los Santos won the South American Championship with Argentina. De los Santos was the first black footballer to appear for Argentina.
