= Blanca Fernández =

Blanca Fernández may refer to:

- Blanca Fernández (runner) (born 1992), Spanish runner
- Blanca Fernández (golfer) (born 2001), Spanish golfer
- Blanca Fernández Morena (born 1972), Spanish politician
- Blanca Fernández Ochoa (1963–2019), Spanish alpine ski racer
