= Daniel Mateo =

Spanish long-distance runner (born 1989)

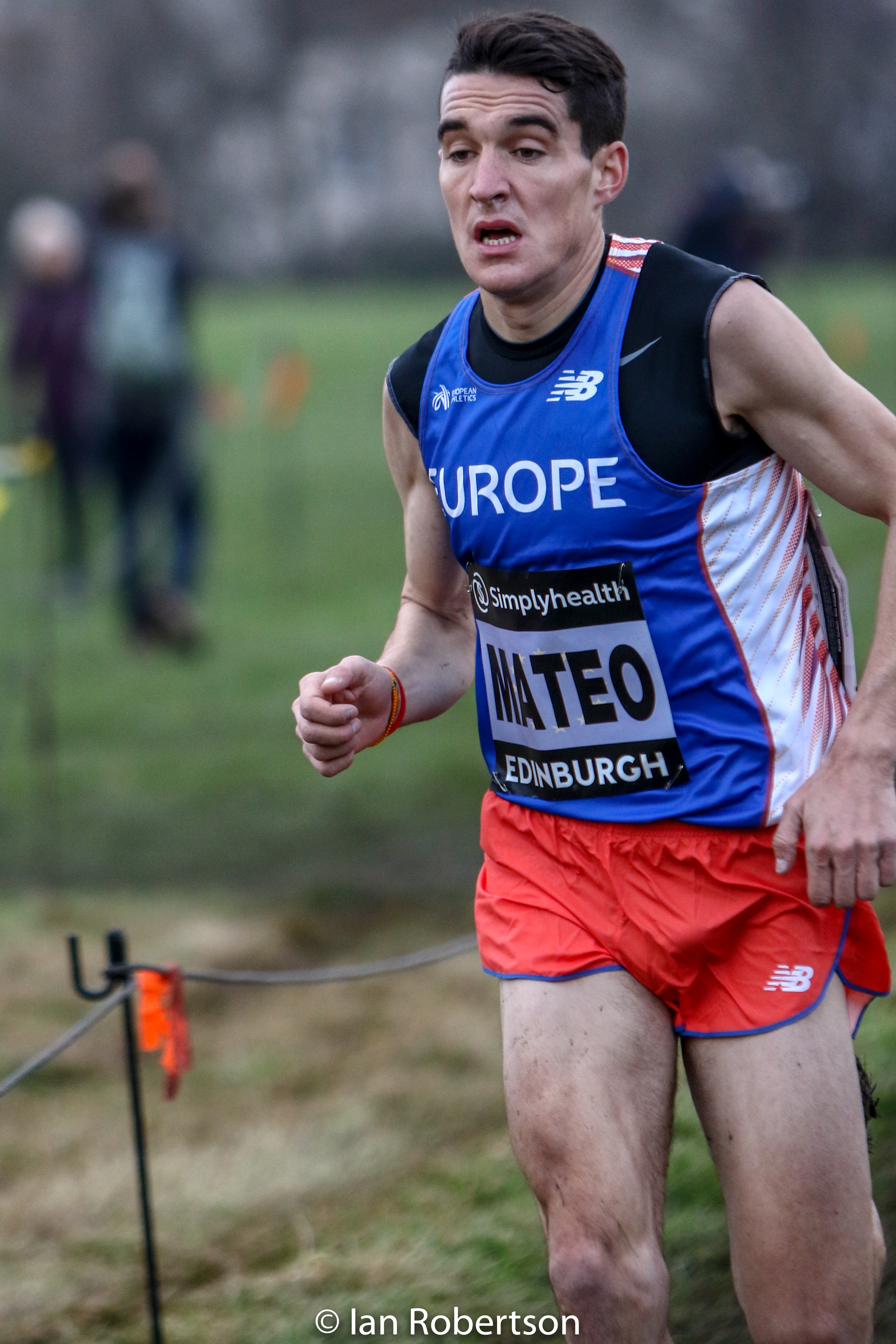
- Mateo in 2018

Personal information
- Full name: Daniel Mateo Angulo
- Nationality: Spanish
- Born: 31 August 1989 (age 36) Soria, Spain
- Height: 182 cm (6 ft 0 in)
- Weight: 68 kg (150 lb)

Sport
- Sport: Track and field
- Event: 5000 m – 10000 m
- Club: Inditecar Box CAUG
- Coached by: Enrique Pascual

Daniel Mateo Angulo (born 31 August 1989) is a Spanish long-distance runner. He has competed in several international competitions representing Spain in both track and field and cross country.

In 2019, he competed in the men's marathon at the 2019 World Athletics Championships held in Doha, Qatar. He finished in 10th place. He has qualified to represent Spain at the 2020 Summer Olympics in the men's marathon event.

== Competition record ==
Year	Competition	Venue	Position	Event	Notes
Representing Spain
2008	World Junior Championships	Bydgoszcz, Poland	14th	10,000 m	30:26.20
2015	World Cross Country Championships	Guiyang, China	53rd	12 km	38:25
2016	Ibero-American Championships	Rio de Janeiro, Brazil	2nd	5,000 m	13:58.11
2016	European Championships	Amsterdam, Netherlands	7th	10,000 m	28:43.03
2018	European Championships	Berlin, Germany	12th	10,000 m	28:44.43
2019	World Championships	Doha, Qatar	10th	Marathon	2:12:15
2021	Olympic Games	Sapporo, Japan	21st	Marathon	2:15:21
2022	European Championships	Munich, Germany	14th	Marathon	2:14:34
