= José Carlos Santana =

Brazilian marathon runner

Personal information
- Born: José Carlos Santana São Paulo, Brazil

Sport
- Country: Brazil
- Sport: Athletics
- Event: Marathon
Medal record
Pan American Games
Silver medal – second place	1991 Havana	Marathon

José Carlos Santana, also known as Santana, is a Brazilian former athlete who specialised in the marathon.

Santana, who was born in São Paulo, was a three-time winner of the Rio de Janeiro Marathon. He claimed a silver medal in the marathon at the 1991 Pan American Games, finishing two seconds behind Alberto Cuba. He had a second-place finish at the 1993 Los Angeles Marathon, which was won by his training partner Joseildo Rocha.

== Personal life ==
Santana is a cousin of marathon runner Marily dos Santos.
