= Luis Molina (athlete) =

Argentine long-distance runner

Personal information
- Born: 7 March 1988 (age 38)

Sport
- Sport: Track and field
- Event: Marathon

Luis Molina (born 7 March 1988) is an Argentine long-distance runner who specialises in the marathon. He competed in the men's marathon event at the 2016 Summer Olympics.
