= Onyema Adigida =

Dutch sprinter (born 2000)

Personal information
- Born: January 7, 2000 (age 26)

Sport
- Country: Netherlands
- Sport: Sport of athletics
- Event: 200 metres

Achievements and titles
- Personal best: 200m: 20.35 (2024)
Medal record
Women's athletics
Representing the Netherlands
European U20 Championships
Gold medal – first place	2019 Borås	200 m
- Updated on March 17, 2025

Onyema Adigida (born 7 January 2000) is a Dutch sprinter. He is a four-time national champion and won the gold medal in the 200 metres at the 2019 European Athletics U20 Championships.

== Career ==
Adigida won his first national medal in 2016, finishing 3rd at the Dutch U18 Championships over 100 m. The following year, he won the 200 m U18 indoor championships and outdoor U18 titles over both 100 m and 200 m. After winning 60 m and 200 m indoor U18 championships in 2018, he placed 2nd at the 2018 Dutch Indoor Athletics Championships over 200 m.

At the 2018 World Athletics U20 Championships, Adigida ran 21.04 seconds over 200 m to break the Dutch U20 record in the first round. He advanced to the semi-finals, where he ran 21.10 to place 3rd in his heat and did not make the finals.

Adigida won 2019 Dutch U20 championships over 60 m and 200 m and then won the 200 m at the 2019 Dutch Indoor Athletics Championships. He won 100 m and 200 m Dutch U20 outdoor titles that year and qualified for the 2019 European Athletics U20 Championships. At the European U20 championships, he ran 21.08 seconds over 200 m to win the gold medal, beating event favorite Aaron Sexton.

Adigida won two additional Dutch indoor 200 m titles at the 2020 Dutch Indoor Athletics Championships and 2021 Dutch Indoor Athletics Championships. Outdoors, he was 3rd at the 2021 Dutch Athletics Championships 200 m and qualified for the 2021 European Athletics U23 Championships, where he was 5th in the 200 m finals.

He was 3rd in the 200 m at the 2022 Dutch Athletics Championships, and the following year he was 7th in the 60 m finals at the 2023 Dutch Indoor Athletics Championships. He didn't qualify for the 60 m finals at the 2024 Dutch indoor championships but was named to the Dutch team at the 2024 World Athletics Relays, where he anchored their men's 4 × 100 m team and was disqualified.

Prior to the 2024 Dutch Athletics Championships, he was injured with a hernia. He ran a personal best of 20.35 seconds over 200 m to win the national title. He was named to the Dutch 4 × 100 m team at the 2024 Summer Olympics, leading off the squad to a 38.48 time for 8th in their heat.

In 2025, Adigida again led off the Dutch 4 × 100 m team at the 2025 World Athletics Relays, placing 3rd in their World Championship qualifying round heat and failing to finish their repechage heat.

== Personal life ==
Adigida is from Amsterdam. He is friends with British sprinter Jeremiah Azu. He drives a motorcycle and morotbiked from the Netherlands to Italy following a coaching change, living in Padua.
