= Laura Hernandez (professor of dairy science) =

American associate professor

Laura Hernandez is an American associate professor of dairy science at the University of Wisconsin–Madison who studies endocrinology and lactation, especially that of dairy cows. Hernandez aims to apply the findings from the ungulates to humans having issues with breastfeeding.

== Career ==
Hernandez grew up in El Paso, Texas. Initially she studied at Iowa State University, however she transferred to New Mexico State University where she completed her master's degree in animal science and toxicology. She started her PhD in 2005 at the University of Arizona with mammary gland physiologist Bob Collier. Hernandez joined the University of Wisconsin–Madison in 2011. Hernandez once embarked on a sabbatical for six months in order to become a clinical lactation consultant, and she also demonstrates at the annual Wisconsin 'Cow College' at University of Wisconsin–Extension designed to educate members of the dairy farm community about the science of cow lactation. In 2014 she was given the Alfred Toepfer Faculty Fellow Award by her department for her promising work as an assistant professor, and in 2017 the American Dairy Science Association (ASDA) awarded her an ASDA Foundation Scholar Award.

== Research ==
Lactation can drain calcium from human and cow mothers. In dairy cows, if this loss is substantial enough, it can cause milk fever. Hernandez's lab showed that increasing levels of the neurotransmitter serotonin lead to changes in the amount of calcium in Jersey and Holstein cows. In Jersey cows the amount of calcium in the milk was increased, while the increase was found in the blood circulation of Holstein cattle, showing different regulation of calcium in the two breeds. Hernandez further demonstrated that SSRIs (which interfere with serotonin uptake by cells) can exacerbate the loss of bone calcium that women experience when breast-feeding their child. Since 12% of lactating women are on SSRIs this could be causing numerous cases of osteoporosis.

Hernandez's lab also studies the lactation of rodents as a model for larger mammals. They published a study in 2019 demonstrating that SSRIs detrimentally impact bone density of newborns as well as the mother due to the inhibition of serotonin, and hence calcium, uptake.
