= Laura Hernández Guzmán =

Mexican psychologist and researcher

- Born: September 21, 1958 (age 68)

Academic background
- Education: University of Kansas (PhD)

Academic work
- Discipline: Psychology
- Sub-discipline: Child psychology
- Institutions: National Autonomous University of Mexico

Laura Hernández Guzmán (born September 21, 1958) is a Mexican psychologist and researcher at the National Autonomous University of Mexico (UNAM). In addition, Hernández Guzmán is the editor-in-chief of the Mexican Journal of Psychology.

== Education and career ==
Hernández Guzmán obtained her Ph.D. in Child and Developmental Psychology at the University of Kansas and her licensure to practice psychology at the National Autonomous University of Mexico (UNAM).

Hernández Guzmán has served on editorial boards of several journals, including serving as the editor-in-chief of the Mexican Journal of Psychology and the editor-in-chief of the International Journal of Psychology. She was the first Latin American to serve as editor-in-chief of the International Journal of Psychology.

Hernández Guzmán works as a level three researcher with the National System of Researchers (Sistema Nacional de Investigadores) and is a level D member of the Program of the Full-Time Academic Staff Performance Program (Programa de Primas al Desempeño del Personal Académico de Tiempo Completo; PRIDE).

As of 2021, she works as a Spanish international editor for Cambridge University Press’ Behavioral and Cognitive Psychotherapy as well as a tutor for the doctorate in psychology and has been appointed as a full-time C-class professor since 1981 at UNAM.

== Research ==
Some of Hernández Guzmán’s most recent research has focused on children and anxiety, as well as effectively treating anger. In 2015, Hernández Guzmán and her team’s Angry Thoughts Scale was added to the American Psychological Association (APA) database. The scale assumes that thoughts, feelings, and actions are linked to anger, which allows us to know the positive effects procedures similar to this have in the treatment of anger or similar emotions.

Hernández Guzmán has discussed how child anxiety is often confused with depression due to the shared symptoms, which also contributes to them being diagnosed interchangeably. Given that 30% of children present internalized anxiety or depressive symptoms, it is important to distinguish the two. If an anxiety disorder is left untreated, it may lead to lower academic performance and may halt the discovery of activities that they enjoy. She states that we need to pay attention to anxious children because if their anxiety is left untreated, they will face worse issues as a result.

== Selected works ==
- Albores-Gallo, L., Hernández-Guzmán, L., Hasfura-Buenaga, C., & Navarro-Luna, E. (2016, July 2). Consistencia interna y validez de criterio de la versión mexicana del Child Behavior Checklist 1.5-5 (CBCL/1.5-5). ScienceDirect.
- Alcázar-Olán, R. J., Deffenbacher, J. L. L., Hernández-Guzmán, L., & Acuña, M. E. de la C. (2014, November 1). The Angry Thoughts Scale: Initial Development in a Mexican Sample. Guilford Press Periodicals.
- Alcázar-Olán, R. J., Deffenbacher, J. L., Guzmán, L. H., & Cárdenas, S. J. (2015). High and low trait anger, angry thoughts, and the recognition of anger problems. The Spanish Journal of Psychology, 18, Article E84.
- Contreras-Valdez, J. A., Hernández-Guzmán, L., & Freyre, M.-Á. (2015). Validez de constructo del Inventario de Depresión de Beck II para adolescentes [Construct validity of the Beck Depression Inventory II in adolescents]. Terapia Psicológica, 33(3), 195–203.
- Contreras-Valdez, J. A., Hernández-Guzmán, L., & Freyre, M.-Á. (2016, May 18). Body dissatisfaction, self-esteem, and depression in girls with obesity. Science Direct.
- Hernández-Guzmán, Laura & Gonzalez-Montesinos M., Manuel & México, D & Raúl, J & Alcázar, Raul. (2013). revista Parental Practices Scale for Children* Escala de Prácticas Parentales para Niños Escala de Práticas Parentais para Crianças Graciela Bermúdez-Ornelas Miguel-Ángel Freyre. Revista Colombiana de Psicologia. 22. 151-161.
- Márquez-Caraveo, María Elena, Hernández-Guzmán, Laura, Aguilar Villalobos, Javier, Pérez-Barrón, Verónica, & Reyes-Sandoval, Marina. (2007). Datos psicométricos del EMBU-I “Mis memorias de crianza” como indicador de la percepción de crianza en una muestra de adolescentes de la Ciudad de México. Salud mental, 30(2), 58-66.
- Seyler, A., Hernández-Guzmán, L., Miguel-Ángel, F., González-Montesinos, M., & Sullivan, M. J. L. (2014). Validez de la Escala de Catastrofización del Dolor. Originales.
