= Nethaneel Mitchell-Blake =

British sprinter (born 1994)

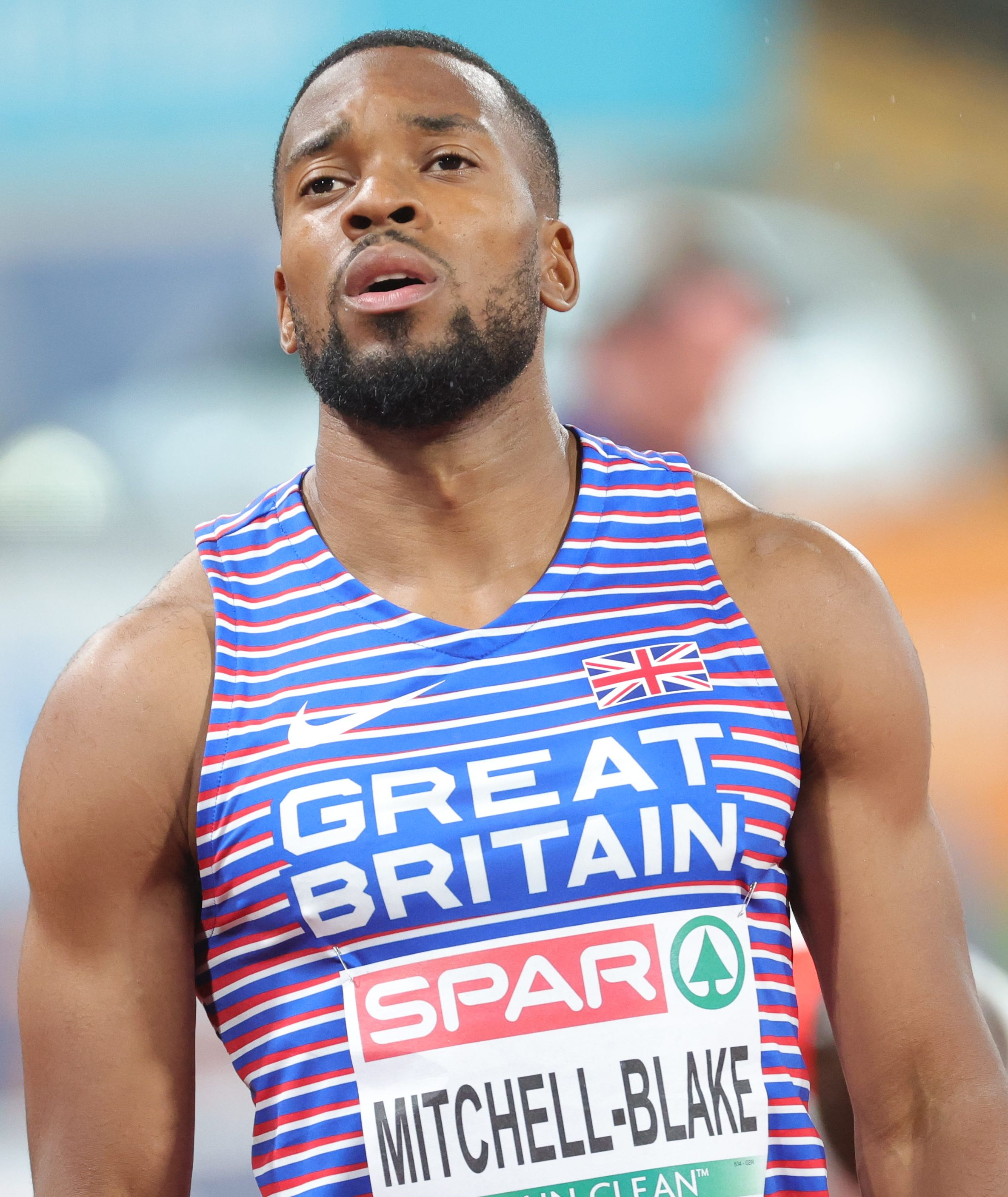
- Mitchell-Blake at the 2022 European Championships

Personal information
- Nationality: British (English)
- Born: 2 April 1994 (age 32) Newham, London, England
- Education: Louisiana State University
- Height: 1.85 m (6 ft 1 in)
- Weight: 86 kg (190 lb)

Sport
- Sport: Men's Athletics
- Event: Sprinting
- Club: Louisiana State University Tigers
- Coached by: Dennis Shaver

Achievements and titles
- Personal bests: 100 m – 9.99 (2017); 150 m - 14.81(2018)(European record); 200 m – 19.95 (2016)
Medal record
Men's athletics
Representing Great Britain
Olympic Games
Bronze medal – third place	2024 Paris	4 × 100 m relay
Disqualified	2020 Tokyo	4 × 100 m relay
World Championships
Gold medal – first place	2017 London	4 × 100 m relay
Silver medal – second place	2019 Doha	4 × 100 m relay
Bronze medal – third place	2022 Eugene	4 × 100 m relay
European Championships
Gold medal – first place	2018 Berlin	4 × 100 m relay
Gold medal – first place	2022 Munich	4 × 100 m relay
Silver medal – second place	2018 Berlin	200 m
Silver medal – second place	2022 Munich	200 m
Representing England
Commonwealth Games
Gold medal – first place	2022 Birmingham	4 × 100 m relay

Nethaneel Joseph Mitchell-Blake (born 2 April 1994) is a British sprinter who specialises in the 200 metres and the 4 × 100 metre relay. He was the 2013 European Junior Champion and his personal best of 19.95 seconds ranks him as the third-fastest in Britain of all time in the individual event. He is one of only three Britons, after Zharnel Hughes and Adam Gemili to break both 10 seconds for 100 metres and 20 seconds for 200 metres.

Part of the Great Britain 4 × 100-metre relay team that won the World title in 2017, he won his first major individual honour, a silver medal, in the individual 200 metres at the 2018 European Athletics Championships before claiming another relay title running for Great Britain, the eventual gold medalists, in the heats of the 4 × 100 metres.

On 18 February 2022 it was announced that Nethaneel and his teammates CJ Ujah, Zharnel Hughes and Richard Kilty would be stripped of their 4 × 100 metres relay 2020 Summer Olympics silver medals after the Court of Arbitration for Sport found CJ Ujah guilty of a doping violation.

Four years later, Mitchell-Blake regained an Olympic medal when Great Britain won the bronze medal in the same event at the 2024 Summer Olympics, along with Hughes and Kilty, in addition to debutants Jeremiah Azu and Louie Hinchliffe.

== Early life and career ==
He was born to Joseph Blake and Audrey Mitchell-Blake in Newham, London, and is of Jamaican descent. His family relocated to Jamaica when he was age thirteen. Having already competed extensively as a child in the UK, his talent for sprinting was recognised by Jamaica College, who took him on, and he competed at the Inter-Secondary Schools Boys and Girls Championships. After a 200 m win at the 2011 Jamaican junior championships in a personal best of 21.54 seconds, he was selected to compete for Great Britain at the 2011 World Youth Championships in Athletics and finished fifth in his semi-final.

Mitchell-Blake was recruited by Louisiana State University and began to compete for them collegiately with the LSU Tigers team. In his first year in 2013 he was a 200 m semi-finalist at the NCAA Outdoor Championships and took fourth in the 4 × 100 metres relay there. In the relay he had top three finishes in the Southeastern Conference in both the 4 × 100 metres relay and 4 × 400 metres relay. He represented Great Britain at the 2013 European Athletics Junior Championships and was the 200 m champion, having set a best of 20.62 seconds. He also helped his country to fifth in the relay.

In his second year at Louisiana he failed to improve after an injury-affected indoor season, having a best of 20.69 seconds. He was again a semi-finalist at the 2014 NCAA Outdoor Championships, though he claimed his first top three finish there with LSU in the 4 × 100 metres relay.

Upon his return to competition in 2016, he set new bests. In the 60 metres he ran 6.65 seconds and in the indoor 200 m he completed the distance in 20.57 seconds. At the Southeastern Conference (SEC) indoor championships he won the 200 m after another best of 20.51 and also placed seventh in the 60 m. He entered the longer event at the 2016 NCAA Division I Indoor Track and Field Championships and finished as runner-up. In the outdoor season, he ran 10.09 seconds for the 100 metres in April, putting him at the top of the seasonal British rankings. He marked a breakthrough at the SEC Outdoor Championships, coming within one hundredth of the British record for the 200 m with his winning time of 19.95 seconds. He completed a regional triple by taking the 100 m individual and relay events, too.

Mitchell-Blake anchored the men's 4 × 100 m relay team to a gold medal at the 2017 World Championships in Athletics. He ran the same leg at the 2019 World Athletics Championships, with the team finishing in silver medal position with a new European record of 37.36 seconds.

Mitchell-Blake won a bronze medal in the 4 × 100 metres relay at the 2024 Summer Olympics.

== International competitions ==
Year	Competition	Venue	Position	Event	Notes
2011	World Youth Championships	Villeneuve d'Ascq, France	5th (semis)	200 m	21.61
2013	European Junior Championships	Rieti, Italy	1st	200 m	20.62
2013	European Junior Championships	Rieti, Italy	5th	4 × 100 m relay	40.09
2016	European Championships	Amsterdam, Netherlands	5th	200 m	20.60
2016	Olympic Games	Rio de Janeiro, Brazil	11th (sf)	200 m	20.25
2017	World Championships	London, United Kingdom	4th	200 m	20.24
2017	World Championships	London, United Kingdom	1st	4 × 100 m relay	37.47
2018	European Championships	Berlin, Germany	2nd	200 m	20.04
2018	European Championships	Berlin, Germany	1st	4 × 100 m relay	37.84
2019	World Relays	Yokohama, Japan	3rd	4 × 100 m relay	38.15
2019	World Championships	Doha, Qatar	2nd	4 × 100 m relay	37.36
2021	Olympic Games	Tokyo, Japan	20th (h)	200 m	20.56
2021	Olympic Games	Tokyo, Japan	Disqualified	4 × 100 m relay	37.51
2022	World Championships	Eugene, United States	12th (sf)	200 m	20.30
2022	World Championships	Eugene, United States	3rd	4 × 100 m relay	37.83
2022	European Championships	Munich, Germany	2nd	200 m	20.17
2022	European Championships	Munich, Germany	1st	4 × 100 m relay	37.67
2024	Olympic Games	Paris, France	3rd	4 × 100 m relay	37.61
2026	Commonwealth Games	Glasgow, United Kingdom	5th	4 × 100 m relay	38.71
