= Pol Retamal =

Spanish sprinter

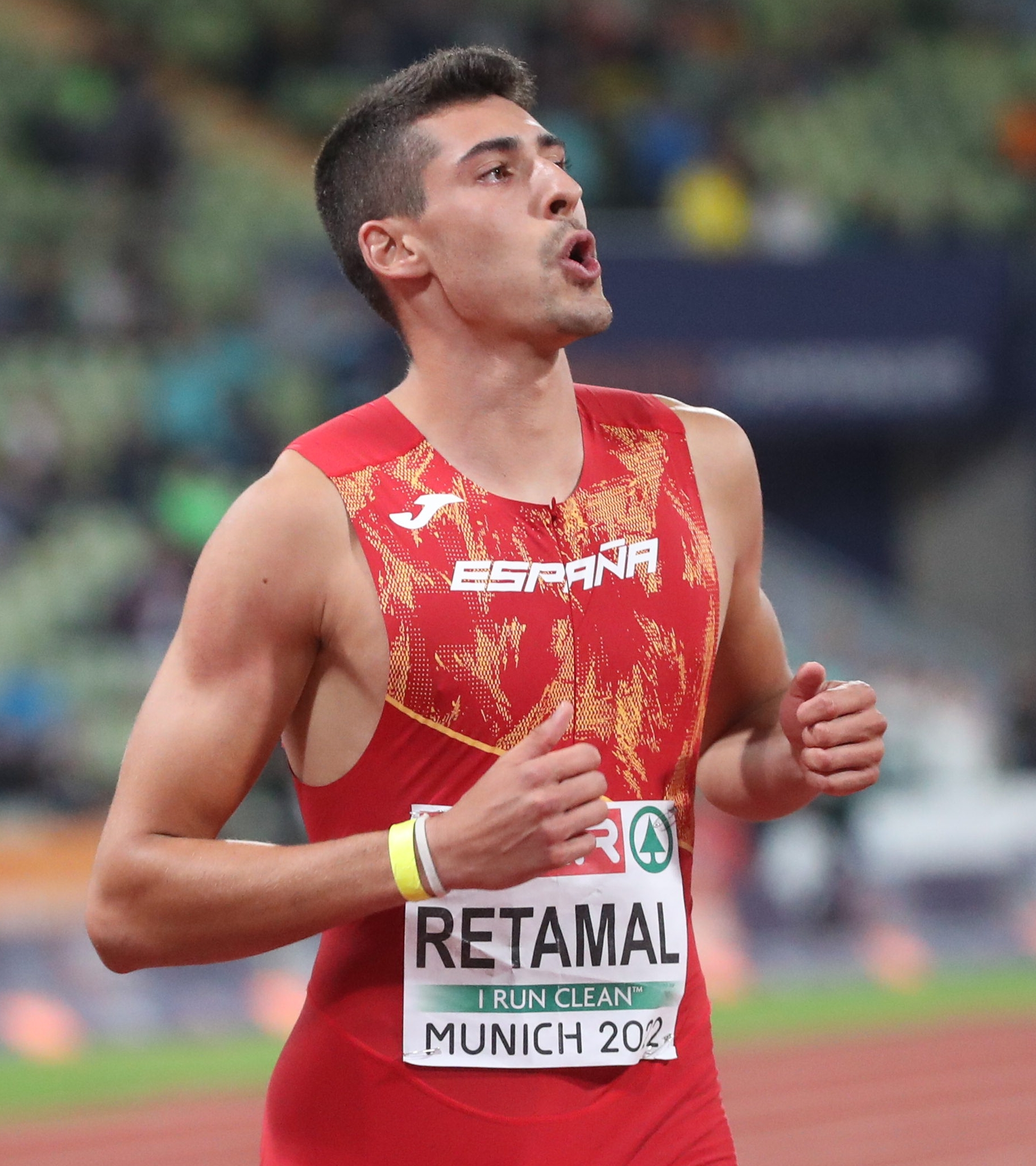
- Retamal in 2022

Personal information
- National team: Spain
- Born: 16 March 1999 (age 27) Vilafranca del Penedès, Spain
- Height: 1.85 m (6 ft 1 in)
- Weight: 72 kg (159 lb)

Sport
- Sport: Athletics
- Event: Sprinting
- Club: FC Barcelona

Achievements and titles
- Personal bests: 100 m: 10.31 (2022); 200 m: 20.28 (2022)
Medal record
Event	1st	2nd	3rd
European Team Championships	0	1	0
European U23 Championships	0	1	1
European U20 Championships	0	0	1
European U18 Championships	0	1	1
Total	0	3	3

Pol Retamal (born 16 March 1999) is a Spanish sprinter finalist in the 200 m at the 2022 European Athletics Championships.

== Competition record ==
Year	Competition	Venue	Position	Event	Notes
Representing Spain
2015	European Youth Olympic Festival	Tbilisi, Georgia	3rd	100 m	10.92
2015	European Youth Olympic Festival	Tbilisi, Georgia	2nd	4 × 100 m relay	42.46
2016	European Youth Championships	Tbilisi, Georgia	3rd	200 m	21.24
2016	European Youth Championships	Tbilisi, Georgia	2nd	Medley relay	1:53.62
2017	European U20 Championships	Grosseto, Italy	4th	200 m	21.02
2017	European U20 Championships	Grosseto, Italy	3rd	4 × 100 m relay	39.59
2018	World U20 Championships	Tampere, Finland	4th	200 m	20.85
2018	European Championships	Berlin, Germany	16th (h)	200 m	20.92
2018	European Championships	Berlin, Germany	9th (h)	4 × 100 m relay	39.12
2021	World Relays	Chorzów, Poland	11th (h)	4 × 100 m relay	39.30
2022	World Championships	Eugene, United States	9th (h)	4 × 100 m relay	38.70
2022	European Championships	Munich, Germany	6th	200 m	20.63
2023	European Games	Chorzów, Poland	9th	200 m	20.86

== National titles ==
- Spanish Athletics Championships
  - 200 metres: 2019, 2022, 2023, 2024

== See also ==
- List of European under-20 records in athletics
