= 2010 South American Cross Country Championships =

Running race

- Organisers: CONSUDATLE
- Edition: 25th
- Date: February 27
- Host city: Guayaquil, Ecuador
- Venue: Campus La Salle
- Events: 6
- Distances: 12 km – Senior men 8 km – Junior men (U20); 4 km – Youth men (U18); 8 km – Senior women 6 km – Junior women (U20); 3 km – Youth women (U18)
- Participation: 82 athletes from 7 nations

The 2010 South American Cross Country Championships took place on February 27, 2010. The races were held at the Campus La Salle in Guayaquil, Ecuador. A detailed report of the event was given for the IAAF.

Complete results and results for junior and youth competitions were published.

== Medallists ==
Event	Gold		Silver		Bronze	
Individual
Senior men (12 km)	Miguel Almachi; Ecuador	35:52.9	Gilberto Silvestre Lopes; Brazil	35:54.8	Alexander de los Santos; Uruguay	35:56.3
Junior (U20) men (8 km)	Jorge Luis Arias; Ecuador	24:25.3	Willy Canchanya; Peru	24:34.2	Juan Pillajo; Ecuador	24:59.7
Youth (U18) men (4 km)	Ioran Fernandes Etchechury; Brazil	11:55.3	Jerson Orellana; Peru	11:57.2	Marcos Guamán; Ecuador	12:03.0
Senior women (8 km)	Inés Melchor; Peru	27:15.9	Ángela Figueroa; Colombia	27:17.2	Rosa Chacha; Ecuador	27:25.2
Junior (U20) women (6 km)	Jovana de la Cruz; Peru	20:49.8	Soledad Torre; Peru	21:26.8	Eliana Delgado; Peru	21:30.6
Youth (U18) women (3 km)	Charo Inga; Peru	09:47.0	Luz Mery Rojas; Peru	10:07.4	Jessica Ladeira Soares; Brazil	10:07.8
Team
Senior men	Brazil	13	Peru	23	Ecuador	28
Junior (U20) men	Ecuador	11	Brazil	31	Peru	31
Youth (U18) men	Ecuador	8	Brazil	9	Chile	13
Senior women	Peru	16	Ecuador	21	Brazil	23
Junior (U20) women	Peru	6	Brazil	17	Ecuador	23
Youth (U18) women	Peru	3	Brazil	8	Ecuador	10

== Race results ==
=== Senior men's race (12 km) ===
Individual race
Rank	Athlete	Country	Time
1st place, gold medalist(s)	Miguel Almachi	Ecuador	35:52.9
2nd place, silver medalist(s)	Gilberto Silvestre Lopes	Brazil	35:54.8
3rd place, bronze medalist(s)	Alexander de los Santos	Uruguay	35:56.3
4	John Cusi	Peru	35:59.7
5	Claudir Rodrigues	Brazil	36:13.2
6	Joilson Bernardo da Silva	Brazil	36:17.2
7	Lervis Arias	Venezuela	36:34.3
8	Damião Ancelmo de Souza	Brazil	36:38.3
9	Constantino León	Peru	36:40.2
10	Waldir Ureta	Peru	36:56.8
11	Abel Villanueva	Peru	37:43.2
12	Segundo Jami	Ecuador	38:06.3
13	Óscar Robayo	Colombia	38:07.7
14	Gilmar Silvestre Lopes	Brazil	38:11.2
15	Pedro Ramos	Ecuador	38:54.1
16	Cristóbal Narváez	Ecuador	39:31.7
—	Byron Piedra	Ecuador	DNS

Teams
Rank	Team	Points
1st place, gold medalist(s)	Brazil: Gilberto Silvestre Lopes / 2; Claudir Rodrigues / 5; Joilson Bernardo da Silva / 6; (Damião Ancelmo de Souza) / (8); (Gilmar Silvestre Lopes) / (14)	13
2nd place, silver medalist(s)	Peru: John Cusi / 4; Constantino León / 9; Waldir Ureta / 10; (Abel Villanueva) / (11)	23
3rd place, bronze medalist(s)	Ecuador: Miguel Almachi / 1; Segundo Jami / 12; Pedro Ramos / 15; (Cristóbal Narváez) / (16)	28

- Note: Athletes in parentheses did not score for the team result.

=== Junior (U20) men's race (8 km) ===
Individual race
Rank	Athlete	Country	Time
1st place, gold medalist(s)	Jorge Luis Arias	Ecuador	24:25.3
2nd place, silver medalist(s)	Willy Canchanya	Peru	24:34.2
3rd place, bronze medalist(s)	Juan Pillajo	Ecuador	24:59.7
4	Miguel Ángel Amador	Colombia	25:06.9
5	Jeison Alexander Suárez	Colombia	25:15.3
6	Antonio Ribeiro Barbosa Filho	Brazil	25:27.7
7	Cristian Baquero	Ecuador	25:31.1
8	Carlos Echeverria	Chile	25:38.4
9	Felipe Matamala	Chile	25:49.5
10	Freddy Cáceres	Ecuador	26:43.8
11	Omar Baquero	Ecuador	26:54.8
12	Renan Marcos Bispo	Brazil	27:08.4
13	Guilherme Ademilson dos Anjos Santos	Brazil	28:00.9
14	José Checco	Peru	28:08.2
15	Aderlin Camayo	Peru	29:21.5
—	João Luis Ferreira Prado Filho	Brazil	DNS
—	Dagoberto Galindo	Chile	DNS

Teams
Rank	Team	Points
1st place, gold medalist(s)	Ecuador: Jorge Luis Arias / 1; Juan Pillajo / 3; Cristian Baquero / 7; (Freddy Cáceres) / (10); (Omar Baquero) / (11)	11
2nd place, silver medalist(s)	Brazil: Antonio Ribeiro Barbosa Filho / 6; Renan Marcos Bispo / 12; Guilherme Ademilson dos Anjos Santos / 13	31
3rd place, bronze medalist(s)	Peru: Willy Canchanya / 2; José Checco / 14; Aderlin Camayo / 15	31

- Note: Athletes in parentheses did not score for the team result.

=== Youth (U18) men's race (4 km) ===
Individual race
Rank	Athlete	Country	Time
1st place, gold medalist(s)	Ioran Fernandes Etchechury	Brazil	11:55.3
2nd place, silver medalist(s)	Jerson Orellana	Peru	11:57.2
3rd place, bronze medalist(s)	Marcos Guamán	Ecuador	12:03.0
4	Carlos Díaz	Chile	12:09.7
5	Juan Clavijo	Ecuador	12:16.4
6	Henry Carbo	Ecuador	12:23.4
7	Jonathan Capón	Ecuador	12:25.7
8	Tiago Lima da Silva	Brazil	12:30.2
9	Lukas Jaramillo	Chile	12:41.1
10	Daniel Garrido	Colombia	12:51.7
11	Edson Pereira Chaves	Brazil	13:06.7
12	Pablo Rodríguez	Ecuador	13:11.0
13	Cristian Pacheco	Peru	13:15.4
14	Francisco Duarte	Chile	14:58.9

Teams
Rank	Team	Points
1st place, gold medalist(s)	Ecuador: Marcos Guamán / 3; Juan Clavijo / 5; (Henry Carbo) / (6); (Jonathan Capón) / (7); (Pablo Rodríguez) / (12)	8
2nd place, silver medalist(s)	Brazil: Ioran Fernandes Etchechury / 1; Tiago Lima da Silva / 8; (Edson Pereira Chaves) / (11)	9
3rd place, bronze medalist(s)	Chile: Carlos Díaz / 4; Lukas Jaramillo / 9; (Francisco Duarte) / (14)	13
4	Peru: Jerson Orellana / 2; Cristian Pacheco / 13	15

- Note: Athletes in parentheses did not score for the team result.

=== Senior women's race (8 km) ===
Individual race
Rank	Athlete	Country	Time
1st place, gold medalist(s)	Inés Melchor	Peru	27:15.9
2nd place, silver medalist(s)	Ángela Figueroa	Colombia	27:17.2
3rd place, bronze medalist(s)	Rosa Chacha	Ecuador	27:25.2
4	Yeisi Álvarez	Venezuela	27:47.5
5	Andréa Celeste da Silva Ramos Benites	Brazil	27:56.5
6	Wilma Arizapana	Peru	28:02.0
7	Rosângela Raimunda Pereira Faria	Brazil	28:26.3
8	Ximena Salazar	Ecuador	28:47.1
9	Judith Toribio	Peru	29:12.6
10	Marlene Acuña	Ecuador	29:39.8
11	Michele Cristina das Chagas	Brazil	30:14.7
12	Nancy Osorio	Ecuador	31:49.0
13	Susana Aburto	Chile	31:49.8
14	Edith Suntaxi	Ecuador	32:21.0
—	Zenaide Vieira	Brazil	DNF
—	Nelbi Sánchez	Bolivia	DNS

Teams
Rank	Team	Points
1st place, gold medalist(s)	Peru: Inés Melchor / 1; Wilma Arizapana / 6; Judith Toribio / 9	16
2nd place, silver medalist(s)	Ecuador: Rosa Chacha / 3; Ximena Salazar / 8; Marlene Acuña / 10; (Nancy Osorio) / (12); (Edith Suntaxi) / (14)	21
3rd place, bronze medalist(s)	Brazil: Andréa Celeste da Silva Ramos Benites / 5; Rosângela Raimunda Pereira Faria / 7; Michele Cristina das Chagas / 11; (Zenaide Vieira) / (DNF)	23

- Note: Athletes in parentheses did not score for the team result.

=== Junior (U20) women's race (6 km) ===
Individual race
Rank	Athlete	Country	Time
1st place, gold medalist(s)	Jovana de la Cruz	Peru	20:49.8
2nd place, silver medalist(s)	Soledad Torre	Peru	21:26.8
3rd place, bronze medalist(s)	Eliana Delgado	Peru	21:30.6
4	Poliana Oliveira Borges	Brazil	21:36.6
5	Jenifer do Nascimento Silva	Brazil	21:57.4
6	Wendy Panchi	Ecuador	22:00.7
7	Jessica García	Ecuador	22:11.2
8	Adriana Cristina Silva da Luz	Brazil	22:15.0
9	Samantha Guerrero	Colombia	22:29.2
10	Andrea Torres	Ecuador	22:39.6
11	Adriely da Silva Araújo	Brazil	22:43.0
12	Norma Freire	Ecuador	24:15.0

Teams
Rank	Team	Points
1st place, gold medalist(s)	Peru: Jovana de la Cruz / 1; Soledad Torre / 2; Eliana Delgado / 3	6
2nd place, silver medalist(s)	Brazil: Poliana Oliveira Borges / 4; Jenifer do Nascimento Silva / 5; Adriana Cristina Silva da Luz / 8; (Adriely da Silva Araújo) / (11)	17
3rd place, bronze medalist(s)	Ecuador: Wendy Panchi / 6; Jessica García / 7; Andrea Torres / 10; (Norma Freire) / (12)	23

- Note: Athletes in parentheses did not score for the team result.

=== Youth (U18) women's race (3 km) ===
Individual race
Rank	Athlete	Country	Time
1st place, gold medalist(s)	Charo Inga	Peru	09:47.0
2nd place, silver medalist(s)	Luz Mery Rojas	Peru	10:07.4
3rd place, bronze medalist(s)	Jessica Ladeira Soares	Brazil	10:07.8
4	Melania Ordoñez	Ecuador	10:20.5
5	Derirrane Lopes Santos	Brazil	10:22.4
6	Jessica León	Ecuador	10:25.7
7	Jessica Espejo	Ecuador	10:28.0
8	Ana Carolina de Oliveira Pacheco	Brazil	10:31.3
9	Micaela Vallejos	Chile	10:48.2
10	Angie Carpintero	Colombia	11:05.1

Teams
Rank	Team	Points
1st place, gold medalist(s)	Peru: Charo Inga / 1; Luz Mery Rojas / 2	3
2nd place, silver medalist(s)	Brazil: Jessica Ladeira Soares / 3; Derirrane Lopes Santos / 5; (Ana Carolina de Oliveira Pacheco) / (8)	8
3rd place, bronze medalist(s)	Ecuador: Melania Ordoñez / 4; Jessica León / 6; (Jessica Espejo) / (7)	10

- Note: Athletes in parentheses did not score for the team result.

== Medal table (unofficial) ==
* Host nation (Ecuador)

Rank	Nation	Gold	Silver	Bronze	Total
1	Peru	6	5	2	13
2	Ecuador*	4	1	6	11
3	Brazil	2	5	2	9
4	Colombia	0	1	0	1
5	Chile	0	0	1	1
5	Uruguay	0	0	1	1
Totals (6 entries)		12	12	12	36

- Note: Totals include both individual and team medals, with medals in the team competition counting as one medal.

== Participation ==
According to an unofficial count, 82 athletes from 7 countries participated. The announced athlete from Bolivia did not show.

- Brazil (22)
- Chile (7)
- Colombia (7)
- Ecuador (26)
- Peru (17)
- Uruguay (1)
- Venezuela (2)

== See also ==
- 2010 in athletics (track and field)
