= 2012 South American Cross Country Championships =

Running race

- Organisers: CONSUDATLE
- Edition: 27th
- Date: March 4
- Host city: Lima, Peru
- Venue: Escuela de Equitación del Ejército
- Events: 6
- Distances: 12 km – Senior men 8 km – Junior men (U20); 4 km – Youth men (U18); 8 km – Senior women 6 km – Junior women (U20); 3 km – Youth women (U18)
- Participation: 85 athletes from 9 nations

The 2012 South American Cross Country Championships took place on March 4, 2012. The races were held at the Escuela de Equitación del Ejército (Army’s Equestrian School) in Lima, Peru. A detailed report of the event was given for the IAAF.

Complete results and results for junior and youth competitions were published.

== Medallists ==
Event	Gold		Silver		Bronze	
Individual
Senior men (12 km)	Gilberto Silvestre Lopes; Brazil	38:05.4	Sergio Celestino da Silva; Brazil	38:27.0	Raúl Machacuay; Peru	38:54.4
Junior (U20) men (8 km)	Thiarles Cacanha dos Santos; Brazil	26:21.3	Yerson Orellana; Peru	26:31.5	Ioran Fernandes Etchechury; Brazil	26:34.6
Youth (U18) men (4 km)	Victor Vinícius Alves da Silva; Brazil	12:40.1	Thiago do Rosário André; Brazil	12:42.3	Weverton Fidélis; Brazil	12:49.2
Senior women (8 km)	Tatiele Roberta de Carvalho; Brazil	28:58.4	Angie Orjuela Soche; Colombia	29:30.4	Nubia Arteaga; Venezuela	29:34.0
Junior (U20) women (6 km)	Luz Mery Rojas; Peru	22:54.7	Belén Casetta; Argentina	23:14.9	Evelyn Escobar; Peru	23:28.9
Youth (U18) women (3 km)	Lucy Basilio; Peru	10:59.0	Angie Legarda Bejarano; Colombia	11:04.6	Zulema Arenas; Peru	11:05.9
Team
Senior men	Brazil	8	Ecuador	21	Peru	25
Junior (U20) men	Brazil	9	Peru	25	Argentina	39
Youth (U18) men	Brazil	3	Colombia	11	Ecuador	14
Senior women	Brazil	12	Peru	21		
Junior (U20) women	Peru	8	Argentina	26	Brazil	27
Youth (U18) women	Peru	4	Brazil	12		

== Race results ==
=== Senior men's race (12 km) ===
Individual race
Rank	Athlete	Country	Time
1st place, gold medalist(s)	Gilberto Silvestre Lopes	Brazil	38:05.4
2nd place, silver medalist(s)	Sergio Celestino da Silva	Brazil	38:27.0
3rd place, bronze medalist(s)	Raúl Machacuay	Peru	38:54.4
4	Paulo Buenaño	Ecuador	39:01.3
5	Leandro Prates Oliveira	Brazil	39:06.5
6	Rafael Santos Novais	Brazil	39:31.3
7	Altobeli Santos da Silva	Brazil	39:39.4
8	Miguel Almachi	Ecuador	39:45.1
9	César Pilaluisa	Ecuador	39:57.7
10	José Luis Rojas	Peru	40:15.1
11	Gerardo Villacres	Ecuador	40:30.0
12	Jean Pierre Castro	Peru	41:00.8
13	Juan Hilario	Peru	41:37.3
—	Alexis Peña	Venezuela	DNF
—	Miguel Amador	Colombia	DNF
—	Abel Villanueva	Peru	DNS

Teams
Rank	Team	Points
1st place, gold medalist(s)	Brazil: Gilberto Silvestre Lopes / 1; Sergio Celestino da Silva / 2; Leandro Prates Oliveira / 5; (Rafael Santos Novais) / (6); (Altobeli Santos da Silva) / (7)	8
2nd place, silver medalist(s)	Ecuador: Paulo Buenaño / 4; Miguel Almachi / 8; César Pilaluisa / 9; (Gerardo Villacres) / (11)	21
3rd place, bronze medalist(s)	Peru: Raúl Machacuay / 3; José Luis Rojas / 10; Jean Pierre Castro / 12; (Juan Hilario) / (13)	25

- Note: Athletes in parentheses did not score for the team result.

=== Junior (U20) men's race (8 km) ===
Individual race
Rank	Athlete	Country	Time
1st place, gold medalist(s)	Thiarles Cacanha dos Santos	Brazil	26:21.3
2nd place, silver medalist(s)	Yerson Orellana	Peru	26:31.5
3rd place, bronze medalist(s)	Ioran Fernandes Etchechury	Brazil	26:34.6
4	Mauricio Matute	Ecuador	26:47.3
5	Alex Render de Almeida	Brazil	27:05.4
6	Iván Choque	Bolivia	27:21.4
7	Marcelo Fabricius	Argentina	27:24.0
8	Cristian Pacheco	Peru	27:25.5
9	Jorge Camargo	Venezuela	27:39.5
10	Vladimir Uzuay	Ecuador	27:41.4
11	Daniel Alcântara	Brazil	27:54.5
12	José Andrés Plata	Colombia	28:07.7
13	Alexander Riaño	Colombia	28:21.2
14	Kevin Aguirre	Argentina	29:04.2
15	Mauricio Díaz	Peru	29:43.6
16	William Díaz	Venezuela	30:15.5
17	Juan Limachi	Peru	30:38.0
18	Miguel Altamirano	Argentina	30:59.2
—	Justino Giraldo	Peru	DNF
—	Sebastián Cano	Argentina	DNF

Teams
Rank	Team	Points
1st place, gold medalist(s)	Brazil: Thiarles Cacanha dos Santos / 1; Ioran Fernandes Etchechury / 3; Alex Render de Almeida / 5; (Daniel Alcântara) / (11)	9
2nd place, silver medalist(s)	Peru: Yerson Orellana / 2; Cristian Pacheco / 8; Mauricio Díaz / 15; (Juan Limachi) / (17); (Justino Giraldo) / (DNF)	25
3rd place, bronze medalist(s)	Argentina: Marcelo Fabricius / 7; Kevin Aguirre / 14; Miguel Altamirano / 18; (Sebastián Cano) / (DNF)	39

- Note: Athletes in parentheses did not score for the team result.

=== Youth (U18) men's race (4 km) ===
Individual race
Rank	Athlete	Country	Time
1st place, gold medalist(s)	Victor Vinícius Alves da Silva	Brazil	12:40.1
2nd place, silver medalist(s)	Thiago do Rosário André	Brazil	12:42.3
3rd place, bronze medalist(s)	Weverton Fidélis	Brazil	12:49.2
4	Camilo Aguillón	Colombia	12:52.2
5	Jhordan Ccope	Peru	12:54.0
6	Jonathán Mogrovejo	Ecuador	13:03.0
7	Ramiro Sanabria	Colombia	13:07.3
8	Pedro Mogrovejo	Ecuador	13:18.6
9	Jhon Vargas	Peru	13:24.5
10	Pablo Quispe	Ecuador	13:25.4
11	Yonathan Ñuñonca	Peru	13:34.5
12	Kevin Gadea	Uruguay	14:05.6

Teams
Rank	Team	Points
1st place, gold medalist(s)	Brazil: Victor Vinícius Alves da Silva / 1; Thiago do Rosário André / 2; (Weverton Fidélis) / (3)	3
2nd place, silver medalist(s)	Colombia: Camilo Aguillón / 4; Ramiro Sanabria / 7	11
3rd place, bronze medalist(s)	Ecuador: Jonathán Mogrovejo / 6; Pedro Mogrovejo / 8; (Pablo Quispe) / (10)	14
4	Peru: Jhordan Ccope / 5; Jhon Vargas / 9; (Yonathan Ñuñonca) / (11)	14

- Note: Athletes in parentheses did not score for the team result.

=== Senior women's race (8 km) ===
Individual race
Rank	Athlete	Country	Time
1st place, gold medalist(s)	Tatiele Roberta de Carvalho	Brazil	28:58.4
2nd place, silver medalist(s)	Angie Orjuela Soche	Colombia	29:30.4
3rd place, bronze medalist(s)	Nubia Arteaga	Venezuela	29:34.0
4	Hortencia Arzapalo	Peru	29:34.5
5	Tatiana de Souza Araújo	Brazil	29:42.4
6	Sirlene Souza de Pinho	Brazil	29:42.9
7	Valdilene dos Santos Silva	Brazil	29:44.8
8	Karina Villazana	Peru	30:00.3
9	Rocío Cantará	Peru	30:05.1
10	Cynthia Ruiz	Peru	30:39.3
11	Andrea Ferris	Panama	30:52.3
12	Yoni Ninahuamán	Peru	31:52.3
13	Mileidys Jaimes	Venezuela	32:04.6
—	Egris Arias	Venezuela	DNF

Teams
Rank	Team	Points
1st place, gold medalist(s)	Brazil: Tatiele Roberta de Carvalho / 1; Tatiana de Souza Araújo / 5; Sirlene Souza de Pinho / 6; (Valdilene dos Santos Silva) / (7)	12
2nd place, silver medalist(s)	Peru: Hortencia Arzapalo / 4; Karina Villazana / 8; Rocío Cantará / 9; (Cynthia Ruiz) / (10); (Yoni Ninahuamán) / (12)	21
—	Venezuela: (Nubia Arteaga) / (3); (Mileidys Jaimes) / (13); (Egris Arias) / (DNF)	(DNF)

- Note: Athletes in parentheses did not score for the team result.

=== Junior (U20) women's race (6 km) ===
Individual race
Rank	Athlete	Country	Time
1st place, gold medalist(s)	Luz Mery Rojas	Peru	22:54.7
2nd place, silver medalist(s)	Belén Casetta	Argentina	23:14.9
3rd place, bronze medalist(s)	Evelyn Escobar	Peru	23:28.9
4	Angelly Gonzáles	Peru	23:55.4
5	Sunilda Lozano	Peru	24:09.3
6	Nelly Puma	Peru	24:13.7
7	Lizeth Choque	Bolivia	24:17.4
8	Jacira Coutinho de Freitas Santos	Brazil	24:30.0
9	Ana Oliveira Pacheco	Brazil	24:43.6
10	Flávia Maria de Lima	Brazil	25:17.5
11	Tamara Arias	Argentina	25:52.7
12	Paola Ríos	Ecuador	26:17.7
13	Estrella Isabel Maldonado	Argentina	26:22.4
14	Sofía Luna	Argentina	27:55.4
—	Jéssica Ladeira Soares	Brazil	DNF
—	Wilyeska Suárez	Venezuela	DNF

Teams
Rank	Team	Points
1st place, gold medalist(s)	Peru: Luz Mery Rojas / 1; Evelyn Escobar / 3; Angelly Gonzáles / 4; (Sunilda Lozano) / (5); (Nelly Puma) / (6)	8
2nd place, silver medalist(s)	Argentina: Belén Casetta / 2; Tamara Arias / 11; Estrella Isabel Maldonado / 13; (Sofía Luna) / (14)	26
3rd place, bronze medalist(s)	Brazil: Jacira Coutinho de Freitas Santos / 8; Ana Oliveira Pacheco / 9; Flávia Maria de Lima / 10; (Jéssica Ladeira Soares) / (DNF)	27

- Note: Athletes in parentheses did not score for the team result.

=== Youth (U18) women's race (3 km) ===
Individual race
Rank	Athlete	Country	Time
1st place, gold medalist(s)	Lucy Basilio	Peru	10:59.0
2nd place, silver medalist(s)	Angie Legarda Bejarano	Colombia	11:04.6
3rd place, bronze medalist(s)	Zulema Arenas	Peru	11:05.9
4	Aldana Sabatel	Uruguay	11:16.5
5	Nathália de Assis Ramalho	Brazil	11:32.7
6	Hetaira Palacios	Peru	11:34.0
7	Alessandra Cordeiro da Rosa	Brazil	11:34.3
8	Karina Pereira Gualberto	Brazil	11:45.4

Teams
Rank
Team
Points

Peru

Lucy Basilio	1
Zulema Arenas	3
(Hetaira Palacios)	(6)

4

Brazil

Nathália de Assis Ramalho	5
Alessandra Cordeiro da Rosa	7
(Karina Pereira Gualberto)	(8)

12

- Note: Athletes in parentheses did not score for the team result.

== Medal table (unofficial) ==
* Host nation (Peru)

Rank	Nation	Gold	Silver	Bronze	Total
1	Brazil (BRA)	8	3	3	14
2	Peru (PER)*	4	3	4	11
3	Colombia (COL)	0	3	0	3
4	Argentina (ARG)	0	2	1	3
5	Ecuador (ECU)	0	1	1	2
6	Venezuela (VEN)	0	0	1	1
Totals (6 entries)		12	12	10	34

- Note: Totals include both individual and team medals, with medals in the team competition counting as one medal.

== Participation ==
According to an unofficial count, 85 athletes from 9 countries participated.

- Argentina (8)
- Bolivia (2)
- Brazil (23)
- Colombia (7)
- Ecuador (10)
- Panama (1)
- Peru (25)
- Uruguay (2)
- Venezuela (7)

== See also ==
- 2012 in athletics (track and field)
