= Santiago Marathon =

Annual sporting event in Chile

Coordinates: 33.4444°S 70.6536°W

- Date: April
- Location: Santiago, Chile
- Event type: Road
- Distance: Marathon, Half marathon, 10K run
- Primary sponsor: Itaú Unibanco
- Established: 2007
- Course records: Men's: 2:09:37 (2017) (Kenya) Luka Lobuwan; Women's: 2:27:59 (2026) (Ethiopia) Tigst Belew
- Website: Santiago Marathon
- Participants: 6,466 (2026)

The Santiago Marathon (Spanish: Maratón de Santiago) is an annual event first run in 2007 through the streets of Santiago Chile. Other races include a half marathon and a 10K run.

The marathon held the IAAF Road Race Bronze Label in 2014, 2015 and 2017.

== Route ==
The race starts and finishes in the Plaza de la Ciudadanía, opposite the Palacio de la Moneda.

== Results ==
Race record in bold

Edition	Year	Men's winner	Time (h:m:s)	Women's winner	Time (h:m:s)
18th	2026	Cornelius Chepkok (KEN)	2:09:48	Tigst Belew (ETH)	**2:27:59**
17th	2025	Carlos Díaz (CHI)	2:09:50	Jovana de la Cruz (PER)	2:33:44
16th	2024	Edwin Koech (KEN)	2:10:19	Josephine Chepkoech (KEN)	2:30:16
15th	2023	Joseph Munywoki (KEN)	2:12:41	Salina Jebet (KEN)	2:36:00
14th	2022	Daniel Cortés (CHL)	2:17:31	Danica Kusanović (CHL)	2:55:14
	2021	postponed due to coronavirus pandemic			
	2020	postponed due to coronavirus pandemic			
13th	2019	Jacob Chulyo (KEN)	2:13:15	Gladys Jepkemoy (KEN)	2:36:35
12th	2018	Luka Lobuwan (KEN)	2:12:10	Aynalem Teferi (ETH)	2:30:29
11th	2017	Luka Lobuwan (KEN)	**2:09:37**	Inés Melchor (PER)	2:34:12
10th	2016	Victor Kipchirchir (KEN)	2:11:01	Ogla Kimaiyo (KEN)	2:35:24
9th	2015	Luka Lobuwan (KEN)	2:11:53	Inés Melchor (PER)	2:28:18
8th	2014	Beraki Beyene (ERI)	2:11:50	Emily Chepkorir (KEN)	2:35:16
7th	2013	Julius Keter (KEN)	2:11:43	Jaqueline Kiplimo (KEN)	2:30:52
6th	2012	Peter Lemayian (KEN)	2:12:52	Natalia Romero (CHI)	2:34:55
5th	2011	Julius Keter (KEN)	2:13:22	Hyvon Ngetich (KEN)	2:34:42
4th	2010	Alene Reta (ETH)	2:12:33	Natalia Romero (CHI)	2:41:13
3rd	2009	George Okworo (KEN)	2:18:19	Érika Olivera (CHI)	2:36:19
2nd	2008	Roberto Echeverría (CHI)	2:15:37	Natalia Romero (CHI)	2:45:42
1st	2007	Miguel Meléndez (CHI)	2:19:47	Érika Olivera (CHI)	2:44:26

== See also ==
- List of marathon races in South America
- Sport in Chile
