= Athletics at the 2010 South American Games – Women's 5,000 metres =

The Women's 5,000m event at the 2010 South American Games was held on March 22 at 17:45.

== Medalists ==
| Gold | Silver | Bronze |
|---|---|---|
| Tatiele de Carvalho; Brazil | Aura Rojas; Colombia | Charo Inga (Peru) Perú |

== Records ==
Standing records prior to the 2010 South American Games
| World record | Tirunesh Dibaba | Ethiopia | 14:11.15 | Oslo, Norway | 6 June 2008 |
| World Leading | Mary Cullen | Ireland | 15:27.75 | Melbourne, Australia | 4 March 2010 |
| South American record | Carmem de Oliveira | Brazil | 15:22.01 | Hechtel, Belgium | 31 July 1993 |
| South American U23 record | Erika Alejandra Olivera | Chile | 15:52.27 | Mar del Plata, Argentina | 6 April 1997 |

== Results ==
Results were published.

| Rank | Athlete | Nationality | Result | Notes |
|---|---|---|---|---|
| 1st place, gold medalist(s) | Tatiele de Carvalho | Brazil | 17:13.53 | |
| 2nd place, silver medalist(s) | Aura Rojas | Colombia | 17:35.45 | SB |
| 3rd place, bronze medalist(s) | Charo Inga | (Peru) Perú | 17:49.41 | |
| 4 | Dina Cid | Chile | 18:37.68 | |
| 5 | Drielle Severiano | Brazil | 18:50.79 | |
| – | Karina Villazana | (Peru) Perú | DSQ | ^{†} |

^{†}: Karina Villazana from (Peru) Perú was initially 2nd in 17:24.31, but was disqualified, because being tested positive for cocaine abuse.

Intermediate times:

| 1000m | 3:17.41 | Charo Inga | (Peru) Perú |
| 2000m | 6:45.21 | Charo Inga | (Peru) Perú |
| 3000m | 10:18.66 | Charo Inga | (Peru) Perú |
| 4000m | 14:00.72 | Karina Villazana | (Peru) Perú |

== See also ==
- 2010 South American Under-23 Championships in Athletics
