= 2009 South American Cross Country Championships =

- Organisers: CONSUDATLE
- Edition: 24th
- Date: February 21
- Host city: Concepción, Bío Bío, Chile
- Venue: Parque del Stadio Italiano
- Events: 6
- Distances: 12 km – Senior men 8 km – Junior men (U20); 4 km – Youth men (U18); 8 km – Senior women 6 km – Junior women (U20); 3 km – Youth women (U18)
- Participation: 73 athletes from 7 nations

The 2009 South American Cross Country Championships took place on February 21, 2009. The races were held at the Parque del Stadio Italiano in Coronel, near Concepción, Bío Bío, Chile. A detailed report of the event was given for the IAAF.

Complete results and results for junior and youth competitions were published.

== Medallists ==
Event	Gold		Silver		Bronze	
Individual
Senior men (12 km)	Roberto Carlos Echeverría; Chile	37:08	Gladson Alberto Silva Barbosa; Brazil	37:14	Sergio Celestino da Silva; Brazil	37:45
Junior (U20) men (8 km)	Víctor Aravena; Chile	25:09	Paulo Sérgio dos Reis Carvalho; Brazil	25:12	Éderson Vilela Pereira; Brazil	25:42
Youth (U18) men (4 km)	Guilherme Ademilson dos Anjos; Brazil	13:03	Dagoberto Galindo; Chile	13:04	David Javier (Peru) Perú	13:05
Senior women (8 km)	Zenaide Vieira; Brazil	28:08	Yeisi Álvarez; Venezuela	28:13	Inés Melchor (Peru) Perú	28:25
Junior (U20) women (6 km)	Charo Inga (Peru) Perú	22:29	Yoni Ninahuamán (Peru) Perú	22:53	Dina Cid; Chile	23:19
Youth (U18) women (3 km)	Patricia Lemos da Silva; Brazil	10:41	Jessica Ladeira Soares; Brazil	10:50	Soledad Torre (Peru) Perú	10:59
Team
Senior men	Brazil	9	Chile	17	Venezuela	41
Junior (U20) men	Brazil	9	Chile	16		
Youth (U18) men	Brazil	10	Chile	18		
Senior women	Brazil	12	Chile	25		
Junior (U20) women	(Peru) Perú	8	Chile	19	Brazil	19
Youth (U18) women	Brazil	9	Chile	25		

== Race results ==
=== Senior men's race (12 km) ===
Individual race
Rank	Athlete	Country	Time
1st place, gold medalist(s)	Roberto Carlos Echeverría	Chile	37:08
2nd place, silver medalist(s)	Gladson Alberto Silva Barbosa	Brazil	37:14
3rd place, bronze medalist(s)	Sergio Celestino da Silva	Brazil	37:45
4	Claudir Rodrigues	Brazil	37:53
5	Adilson Alves Dolberth	Brazil	38:02
6	Richard Mamani	Bolivia	38:03
7	Mauricio Díaz	Chile	38:04
8	Constantino León	(Peru) Perú	38:05
9	Leslie Encina	Chile	38:27
10	Daniel Chaves da Silva	Brazil	38:30
11	Nicolás Cuestas	Uruguay	38:38
12	Didimo Sánchez	Venezuela	39:04
13	Raúl Mora	Chile	391:1
14	Lervis Arias	Venezuela	39:32
15	Deivis Sánchez	Venezuela	39:37
16	Ernesto Andrés Zamora	Uruguay	39:40
17	Pablo Gardiol	Uruguay	39:57
18	Patricio Uribe	Chile	41:19

Teams
Rank	Team	Points
1st place, gold medalist(s)	Brazil: Gladson Alberto Silva Barbosa / 2; Sergio Celestino da Silva / 3; Claudir Rodrigues / 4; (Adilson Alves Dolberth) / (5); (Daniel Chaves da Silva) / (10)	9
2nd place, silver medalist(s)	Chile: Roberto Carlos Echeverría / 1; Mauricio Díaz / 7; Leslie Encina / 9; (Patricio Uribe) / (18)	17
3rd place, bronze medalist(s)	Venezuela: Didimo Sánchez / 12; Lervis Arias / 14; Deivis Sánchez / 15	41
4	Uruguay: Nicolás Cuestas / 11; Ernesto Andrés Zamora / 16; Pablo Gardiol / 17	44

- Note: Athletes in parentheses did not score for the team result.

=== Junior (U20) men's race (8 km) ===
Individual race
Rank	Athlete	Country	Time
1st place, gold medalist(s)	Víctor Aravena	Chile	25:09
2nd place, silver medalist(s)	Paulo Sérgio dos Reis Carvalho	Brazil	25:12
3rd place, bronze medalist(s)	Éderson Vilela Pereira	Brazil	25:42
4	Antonio Ribeiro Barbosa Filho	Brazil	26:09
5	Valdison das Neves Silva	Brazil	26:14
6	Daniel Estrada	Chile	27:02
7	Derlis Ayala	Paraguay	27:08
8	Cirilo Nogales	Bolivia	27:19
9	Felipe Matamala	Chile	27:43
10	Jordan Camejo	Venezuela	28:32
11	Raúl Moya	Chile	28:60

Teams
Rank
Team
Points

Brazil

Paulo Sérgio dos Reis Carvalho	2
Éderson Vilela Pereira	3
Antonio Ribeiro Barbosa Filho	4
(Valdison das Neves Silva)	(5)

9

Chile

Víctor Aravena	1
Daniel Estrada	6
Felipe Matamala	9
(Raúl Moya)	(11)

16

- Note: Athletes in parentheses did not score for the team result.

=== Youth (U18) men's race (4 km) ===
Individual race
Rank	Athlete	Country	Time
1st place, gold medalist(s)	Guilherme Ademilson dos Anjos	Brazil	13:03
2nd place, silver medalist(s)	Dagoberto Galindo	Chile	13:04
3rd place, bronze medalist(s)	David Javier	(Peru) Perú	13:05
4	Ioran Fernandes Etchechury	Brazil	13:12
5	Tiago Lima da Silva	Brazil	13:17
6	Niel Alarcón	(Peru) Perú	13:21
7	Roberto Tello	Chile	13:28
8	Iván Choque	Bolivia	13:29
9	Juan Cárcamo	Chile	13:31

Teams
Rank
Team
Points

Brazil

Guilherme Ademilson dos Anjos	1
Ioran Fernandes Etchechury	4
Tiago Lima da Silva	5

10

Chile

Dagoberto Galindo	2
Roberto Tello	7
Juan Cárcamo	9

18

- Note: Athletes in parentheses did not score for the team result.

=== Senior women's race (8 km) ===
Individual race
Rank	Athlete	Country	Time
1st place, gold medalist(s)	Zenaide Vieira	Brazil	28:08
2nd place, silver medalist(s)	Yeisi Álvarez	Venezuela	28:13
3rd place, bronze medalist(s)	Inés Melchor	(Peru) Perú	28:25
4	Nelbi Sánchez	Bolivia	28:29
5	Sueli Pereira Silva	Brazil	28:35
6	Rosângela Raimunda Pereira Faria	Brazil	28:56
7	Clara Morales	Chile	29:00
8	Érika Olivera	Chile	29:17
9	Adriana Aparecida da Silva	Brazil	29:26
10	Susana Rebolledo	Chile	29:30
11	Claudia Ramírez	Uruguay	31:17
12	Rosa Elizabeth Ramos	Paraguay	31:45
13	Isabel Lobos	Chile	31:58
—	Eliana Vásquez	Chile	DNF

Teams
Rank
Team
Points

Brazil

Zenaide Vieira	1
Sueli Pereira Silva	5
Rosângela Raimunda Pereira Faria	6
(Adriana Aparecida da Silva)	(9)

12

Chile

Clara Morales	7
Érika Olivera	8
Susana Rebolledo	10
(Isabel Lobos)	(13)
(Eliana Vásquez)	(DNF)

25

- Note: Athletes in parentheses did not score for the team result.

=== Junior (U20) women's race (6 km) ===
Individual race
Rank	Athlete	Country	Time
1st place, gold medalist(s)	Charo Inga	(Peru) Perú	22:29
2nd place, silver medalist(s)	Yoni Ninahuamán	(Peru) Perú	22:53
3rd place, bronze medalist(s)	Dina Cid	Chile	23:19
4	Jenifer do Nascimento Silva	Brazil	23:43
5	Jovanna da la Cruz	(Peru) Perú	23:53
6	Bárbara González	Chile	24:34
7	Adriana Oliveira Silva	Brazil	24:57
8	Rafaela Ritz dos Santos	Brazil	24:59
9	Derirrane Lopes Santos	Brazil	25:12
10	Margarita Masías	Chile	26:49
—	Darling Bascur	Chile	DNF

Teams
Rank	Team	Points
1st place, gold medalist(s)	(Peru) Perú: Charo Inga / 1; Yoni Ninahuamán / 2; Bárbara González / 6	8
2nd place, silver medalist(s)	Chile: Dina Cid / 3; Bárbara González / 6; Margarita Masías / 10; (Darling Bascur) / (DNF)	19
3rd place, bronze medalist(s)	Brazil: Jenifer do Nascimento Silva / 4; Adriana Oliveira Silva / 7; Rafaela Ritz dos Santos / 8; (Derirrane Lopes Santos) / (9)	19

- Note: Athletes in parentheses did not score for the team result.

=== Youth (U18) women's race (3 km) ===
Individual race
Rank	Athlete	Country	Time
1st place, gold medalist(s)	Patricia Lemos da Silva	Brazil	10:41
2nd place, silver medalist(s)	Jessica Ladeira Soares	Brazil	10:50
3rd place, bronze medalist(s)	Soledad Torre	(Peru) Perú	10:59
4	Alelí Aparicio	(Peru) Perú	11:02
5	Helen Baltazar	Bolivia	11:23
6	Bruna Esser Rocha	Brazil	11:30
7	Giselle Álvarez	Chile	11:36
8	María Silva	Chile	11:39
9	Juana Paniagua	Paraguay	11:46
10	Micaela Vallejos	Chile	11:47

Teams
Rank
Team
Points

Brazil

Patricia Lemos da Silva	1
Jessica Ladeira Soares	2
Bruna Esser Rocha	6

9

Chile

Giselle Álvarez	7
María Silva	8
Micaela Vallejos	10

25

- Note: Athletes in parentheses did not score for the team result.

== Medal table (unofficial) ==
* Host nation (Chile)

Rank	Nation	Gold	Silver	Bronze	Total
1	Brazil (BRA)	8	3	3	14
2	Chile (CHI)*	2	7	1	10
3	Peru (PER)	2	1	3	6
4	Venezuela (VEN)	0	1	1	2
Totals (4 entries)		12	12	8	32

- Note: Totals include both individual and team medals, with medals in the team competition counting as one medal.

== Participation ==
According to an unofficial count, 73 athletes from 7 countries participated.

- Bolivia (5)
- Brazil (23)
- Chile (24)
- Paraguay (3)
- (Peru) Perú (9)
- Uruguay (4)
- Venezuela (5)

== See also ==
- 2009 in athletics (track and field)
