= 2003 South American Junior Championships in Athletics =

XXXV South American Junior Championships in Athletics
- Dates: June 7–8
- Host city: Guayaquil, Ecuador
- Venue: Estadio Modelo
- Level: Junior
- Events: 44
- Participation: about 230 athletes from 12 nations

The 35th South American Junior Championships in Athletics were held at the Estadio Modelo in Guayaquil, Ecuador from June 7–8, 2003.

== Participation (unofficial) ==
Detailed result lists can be found on the "World Junior Athletics History" website. An unofficial count yields the number of about 230 athletes from about 12 countries: Argentina (21), Bolivia (4), Brazil (68), Chile (37), Colombia (20), Ecuador (34), Guyana (1), Panama (2), Paraguay (2), Peru (10), Uruguay (4), Venezuela (27).

== Medal summary ==
Medal winners are published for men and women Complete results can be found on the "World Junior Athletics History" website.

=== Men ===
Event	Gold		Silver		Bronze	
100 metres	Jorge Sena (BRA)	10.45	Bruno Góes (BRA)	10.56	Andrés Rodríguez (PAN)	10.79
200 metres	Jorge Sena (BRA)	21.32	Bruno Góes (BRA)	21.40	Andrés Silva (URU)	21.45
400 metres	Andrés Silva (URU)	46.54	Thiago Chyaromont (BRA)	47.37	Francisco Aguirre (ECU)	47.56
800 metres	Thiago Chyaromont (BRA)	1:51.41	Kléberson Davide (BRA)	1:51.41	Evans Pinto (BOL)	1:53.10
1500 metres	Matías Carranza (ARG)	3:54.3	Danny Cornieles (VEN)	3:54.9	Jean Calzadilla (VEN)	3:55.4
5000 metres	Gilialdo Koball (BRA)	14:43.2	Deivis Sanches (VEN)	14:49.7	John Cusi (PER)	14:51.7
10,000 metres	Deivis Sanches (VEN)	31:21.77	Adilson Dolberth (BRA)	31:23.48	Jefferson de Castro (BRA)	31:57.52
3000 metres steeplechase	Rodolfo Hass (BRA)	9:02.23#	Cristián Patiño (ECU)	9:02.24#	Jean Calzadilla (VEN)	9:14.95#
110 metres hurdles	Rodrigo Pereira (BRA)	14.19	Diego Soffia (CHI)	14.81	Elton Costa (BRA)	14.88
400 metres hurdles	Ricardo da Silva (BRA)	52.81	Raphael Fernandes (BRA)	53.15	Cristian Deymonaz (ARG)	53.61
High jump	Fábio Baptista (BRA)	2.09	Ederson de Oliveira (BRA)	2.06	Cristián Herrera (CHI)	2.06
Pole vault	Germán Chiaraviglio (ARG)	5.16	João Gabriel Sousa (BRA)	5.00	Guillermo Chiaraviglio II (ARG)	4.65
Long jump	Thiago Dias (BRA)	7.51	Rubens dos Santos (BRA)	7.41	Pablo Schultz (CHI)	7.31w
Triple jump	Leonardo dos Santos (BRA)	15.89w	Henagio Galvão (BRA)	15.47	Adalberto Mulato (COL)	15.05w
Shot put	Gustavo de Mendonça (BRA)	19.67#	Geovanny García (COL)	18.64#	Jhoan Jaramillo (VEN)	17.89#
Discus throw	Gustavo de Mendonça (BRA)	62.29*	Ronald Julião (BRA)	56.36*	Germán Lauro (ARG)	56.08*
Hammer throw	Leandro Benetti (ARG)	66.69*	Douglas dos Santos (BRA)	57.12*	Tomás Angosto (CHI)	56.12*
Javelin throw	Júlio César de Oliveira (BRA)	70.94	Johny Viáfara (COL)	61.84	Aercio de Oliveira (BRA)	58.90
Decathlon	Matías López (ARG)	6749*	Freddy Díaz (VEN)	6396*	Pablo Cabrera (ARG)	6357*
10,000 metres track walk	Patricio Ortega (ECU)	44:07.5	Carlos Borgoño (CHI)	44:09.3	Vanderlei dos Santos (BRA)	46:15.0
4 × 100 metres relay	Brazil; Andrè de Oliveira; Rafael da Silva; Bruno Góes; Jorge Sena	41.19	Chile; Pedro Kunstmann; S. Barros; Diego Soffia; Martín Barros	42.07	Argentina; Lucas Prada; Sebastian Lasquera; Pablo Cabrera; Federico Satler	42.54
4 × 400 metres relay	Brazil; Raphael Fernandes; Kleberson Davide; Thiago Chyaromont; Daniel Herrmann	3:14.03	Argentina; Matias López; Sebastian Lasquera; Christian Deymonnaz; Lucas Prada	3:17.41	Ecuador; J. Ruiz; Eddy Bravo; Esteban Lucero; Francisco Aguirre	3:19.09

=== Women ===
Event	Gold		Silver		Bronze	
100 metres	Evelyn dos Santos (BRA)	11.66	Wilmary Álvarez (VEN)	11.68	Franciela Krasucki (BRA)	11.77
200 metres	Wilmary Álvarez (VEN)	23.68	Evelyn dos Santos (BRA)	24.01	Ángela Alfonso (VEN)	24.14
400 metres	Amanda Dias (BRA)	54.50	Ángela Alfonso (VEN)	54.65	Fernanda Tavares (BRA)	56.38
800 metres	Rejane da Silva (BRA)	2:11.16	Jenny Mejías (VEN)	2:12.13	Lidia da Silva (BRA)	2:14.34
1500 metres	Rejane da Silva (BRA)	4:32.2	Sabine Heitling (BRA)	4:33.0	Rocío Huillca (PER)	4:35.0
3000 metres	Inés Melchor (PER)	9:58.83	Zenaide Vieira (BRA)	9:59.86	Gabriela Oliveira (BRA)	10:01.86
5000 metres	Inés Melchor (PER)	16:57.0	Gabriela Oliveira (BRA)	17:05.1	Michele das Chagas (BRA)	17:06.0
3000 metres steeplechase	Zenaide Vieira (BRA)	10:37.85#	Ángela Figueroa (COL)	10:46.24#	Edna Souza (BRA)	11:00.52#
100 metres hurdles	Lucimara da Silva (BRA)	14.16	Karina Quejada (COL)	14.17	Evelyn de Santana (BRA)	14.56
400 metres hurdles	Amanda Dias (BRA)	59.38	Fernanda Tavares (BRA)	60.99	Jessica Miller (URU)	61.61
High jump	Catherine Ibargüen (COL)	1.80	Jailma de Lima (BRA)	1.77	Marielys Rojas (VEN)	1.77
Pole vault	Karla da Silva (BRA)	3.85	Milena Agudelo (COL)	3.80	Michaela Heitkotter (BRA)	3.65
Long jump	Macarena Reyes (CHI)	6.10	Kauiza Venâncio (BRA)	5.65	Daisy Ugarte (BOL)	5.61
Triple jump	Catherine Ibargüen (COL)	13.05	Macarena Reyes (CHI)	12.64w	Daisy Ugarte (BOL)	12.60
Shot put	Paola Cheppi (ARG)	15.11	Leidy Arboleda (COL)	14.34	Juliana Olier (COL)	14.04
Discus throw	Roberto Argentino (BRA)	42.36	Juliana Olier (COL)	42.31	Martha Ayala (ARG)	41.42
Hammer throw	Adriana Benaventa (VEN)	55.39	Juliana Olier (COL)	49.86	Daniela San José (CHI)	47.41
Javelin throw	Mariela Aguer (ARG)	48.20	Maria Ramos (BRA)	46.58	Leidy Arboleda (COL)	46.37
Heptathlon	Jailma de Lima (BRA)	4979	María Azzato (ARG)	4635	Claritza Chourio (VEN)	4460
10,000 metres track walk	Alessandra Picagevicz (BRA)	49:22.7	Juana Cahui (PER)	49:30.1	Josette Sepúlveda (CHI)	51:27.8
4 × 100 metres relay	Chile; Maria Carolina Díaz; Fernanda MacKenna; Macarena Reyes; Daniela Riderelli	46.54	Venezuela; Jackeline Carabali; Wilmary Álvarez; Angela Alfonso; Ada Hernández	46.92	Brazil; Josiane Valentim; Evelyn dos Santos; Marcia Palinkas; Franciela Krasucki	46.92
4 × 400 metres relay	Brazil; Suelen da Silva; Fernanda Tavares; Maria da Costa; Amanda Dias	3:42.24	Venezuela; Wilmary Álvarez; Jenny Mejías; Maria Londoño; Angela Alfonso	3:42.55	Ecuador; E. Freire; Karina Caicedo; Jessica Perea; Grace Arias	3:50.73

== Medal table (unofficial) ==
* Host nation (Ecuador)

Rank	Nation	Gold	Silver	Bronze	Total
1	Brazil	27	20	13	60
2	Argentina	6	2	6	14
3	Venezuela	3	8	6	17
4	Colombia	2	8	3	13
5	Chile	2	4	5	11
6	Peru	2	1	2	5
7	Ecuador*	1	1	3	5
8	Uruguay	1	0	2	3
9	Bolivia	0	0	3	3
10	Panama	0	0	1	1
Totals (10 entries)		44	44	44	132
