= Adalberto García =

Brazilian long-distance runner

Adalberto Garcia
Personal information
- Full name: Adalberto Batista Garcia
- Nationality: Brazilian
- Born: 31 August 1967 (age 58) Indiaporã, São Paulo, Brazil

Sport
- Sport: Long-distance running
- Event: 5000 metres

Adalberto Batista Garcia (born 31 August 1967) is a Brazilian long-distance runner. He competed in the men's 5000 metres at the 1996 Summer Olympics.

Garcia was born in Indiaporã, São Paulo, Brazil. A friend convinced him to start running at age 17. He trained under the Smel Rio Preto / Brasil Telecom team. In 1992, he came third at the Gate River Run; in 1995, he was the second best Brazilian in the Saint Silvester Road Race, and he came second at the Rio Half Marathon.

After winning the 1996 Troféu Brasil de Atletismo 5000 m and 10,000 m, Garcia qualified for the 5000 m at the 1996 Olympics, where he finished 12th in his heat and did not advance.

Following the Olympics, Garcia focused on road running, participating once more in events like the Saint Silvester Road Race, placing 27th at the 1998 edition. In 1999, he came in third at the Troféu Brasil's 5km race, and won the 50 Years of Marcopolo 10.5km race held in the snow in southern Brazil. He placed 1st at the 2001 São Silvestre de Brodowski race, winning a car in lieu of prize money. The following year, Garcia defended his title by taking advantage of his competitor David Cheruiyot falling into a ditch.

In 2000, Garcia was the Brazilian record holder over 5000 metres.

Garcia won the 2005 São José do Rio Preto stage of the Fila Paulista Circuit, finishing the 10K run course in under 30 minutes. Training under the Funilense club, Garcia won the 15 de Fevereiro Pedestrian Race in 2005. Having won the race in 1995, it marked ten years since his last win. He retired from competition in 2007. In school, Garcia studied physical education.
