= Athletics at the 2010 South American Games – Men's 10,000 metres =

The Men's 10,000m event at the 2010 South American Games was held on March 21 at 17:00.

== Medalists ==
Gold	Silver	Bronze
Javier Peña; Colombia	Daniel Chaves da Silva; Brazil	Gilberto Silvestre Lopes; Brazil

== Records ==
Standing records prior to the 2010 South American Games
World record	Kenenisa Bekele	Ethiopia	26:17.53	Brussels, Belgium	26 August 2005
World Leading	Solonei da Silva	Brazil	29:39.72	Rio de Janeiro, Brazil	26 February 2010
South American record	Marilson dos Santos	Brazil	27:28.12	Neerpelt, Belgium	2 June 2007
South American U23 record	Rolando Vera	Ecuador	28:20.24	Roma, Italy	29 August 1987

== Results ==
Results were published.

Rank	Athlete	Nationality	Result	Notes
1st place, gold medalist(s)	Javier Peña	Colombia	30:04.78	
2nd place, silver medalist(s)	Daniel Chaves da Silva	Brazil	31:03.27	
3rd place, bronze medalist(s)	Gilberto Silvestre Lopes	Brazil	31:22.33	
4	Carlos Aníbal Contreras	Ecuador	32:59.42	
5	Wily Canchanya	(Peru) Perú	33:26.68	
–	Víctor Aravena	Chile	DNF	

Intermediate times:

1000m	2:57.00	Javier Peña (COL)
2000m	5:53.30	Javier Peña (COL)
3000m	8:47.66	Javier Peña (COL)
4000m	11:45.12	Javier Peña (COL)
5000m	14:45.76	Javier Peña (COL)
6000m	17:46.67	Javier Peña (COL)
7000m	20:50.96	Javier Peña (COL)
8000m	23:55.39	Javier Peña (COL)
9000m	27:02.39	Javier Peña (COL)

== See also ==
- 2010 South American Under-23 Championships in Athletics
