= 1998 Saint Silvester Road Race =

The 1998 Saint Silvester Road Race (Portuguese: Corrida Internacional de São Silvestre de 1998) was the 74th edition of the Saint Silvester Road Race and held in São Paulo, Brazil, on December 31, 1998. The distance ran by the participating athletes was 15 km.

The men's race was won by Kenya's Paul Tergat, his third victory, whereas the women's event was won by Serbia and Montenegro's Olivera Jevtić, her first triumph.

The podiums were composed of the first seven men and the first five women.

== Classification ==
=== Men ===
Position	Athlete	Nationality	Time
1	Paul Tergat	Kenya	44min47s
2	Hendrick Ramaala	South Africa	45min05s
3	Elijah Kiptarbei Lagat	Kenya	45min08s
4	Silvio Guerra	Ecuador	45min17s
5	John Gwako	Kenya	45min29s
6	Emerson Iser Bem	Brazil	45min37s
7	José Teles de Souza	Brazil	45min56s
8	Geraldo de Assis	Brazil	46min04s
9	Patrick Ndayisenga	Burundi	46min11s
10	Delmir dos Santos	Brazil	46min38s
11	Nestor García	Uruguay	46min41s
12	Valdenor dos Santos	Brazil	46min48s
13	Elenilson da Silva	Brazil	46min49s
14	John Secco Morapedi	South Africa	46min52s
15	Germán Silva	Mexico	46min52s
16	Clodoaldo Gomes da Silva	Brazil	46min58s
17	Éder Fialho	Brazil	47min
18	Luiz Antonio dos Santos	Brazil	47min03s
19	Manoel de Jesus Teixeira	Brazil	47min04s
20	Luiz Carlos da Silva	Brazil	47min08s
21	Joacir Pereira Falcão	Brazil	47min13s
22	Otávio dos Santos Pinheiro	Brazil	47min15s
23	Leonso Hugo Jimenez	Colombia	47min22s
24	Caetano Joaquim dos Santos	Brazil	47min26s
25	Luis Carlos Ramos	Brazil	47min34s
26	André Luis Ramoa	Brazil	47min43s
27	Adalberto Batista Garcia	Brazil	47min44s
28	Antônio Ferreira da Silva	Brazil	47min49s
29	Paulo Alves dos Santos	Brazil	47min50s
30	Elisvaldo de Carvalho	Brazil	47min56s
31	Juan Carlos Gutierrez	Colombia	47min57s
32	Eli Chagas	Brazil	47min58s
33	Leonardo Junior da Silva	Brazil	48min04s
34	Silvio Antonio	Argentina	48min06s
35	Wellington Correa Fraga	Brazil	48min11s
36	Osmiro de Souza Silva	Brazil	48min16s
37	Everton Luduvice de Moraes	Brazil	48min30s
38	Reginaldo Recofka Silva	Brazil	48min36s
39	Sérgio Correa Couto	Brazil	48min39s
40	Luiz Claudio Santos Miranda	Brazil	48min39s

For the complete record, with all the 9,390 runners that qualified in the official results board, please visit the referenced website below.

=== Women ===
Position	Athlete	Nationality	Time
1	Olivera Jevtić	(Serbia and Montenegro) Yugoslavia	51min35s
2	Martha Tenorio	Ecuador	51min55s
3	Jane Wanjiku Ngotho	Kenya	52min42s
4	Erika Olivera	Chile	53min33s
5	Cleuza Maria Irineu	Brazil	53min56s
6	Márcia Narloch	Brazil	54min35s
7	Wilma Guerra	Ecuador	54min59s
8	Rosângela Raimunda P. Faria	Brazil	55min08s
9	Petrova Liovdmila	Russia	55min47s
10	Nagel Rodica	France	56min08s
11	Rita de Cássia Santos de Jesus	Brazil	56min16s
12	Maria del Carmen Diaz Mancilla	Mexico	56min20s
13	Marlene Teixeira Fortunato	Brazil	56min26s
14	Nadir Sabino de Siqueira	Brazil	57min05s
15	Rizoneide Wanderley	Brazil	57min16s
16	Janete Mayal	Brazil	57min19s
17	Hastella Castro Zabala	Colombia	57min21s
18	Luciene Soares de Deus	Brazil	57min44s
19	Edvânia Maria Valério da Silva	Brazil	57min58s
20	Rosa Mila Ibarra Cadena	Colombia	57min59s
21	Solange Cordeiro de Souza	Brazil	58min17s
22	Célia Regina F. dos Santos	Brazil	58min30s
23	Maria Sandra Pereira Silva	Brazil	59min17s
24	Alice de Souza Cordeiro	Brazil	59min29s
25	Berenice Dias de Meira	Brazil	59min37s
26	Marily dos Santos	Brazil	59min59s
27	Lucélia de Oliveira Peres	Brazil	1h00min03s
28	Maria da Conceição Neri	Brazil	1h00min05s
29	Leone Justino da Silva	Brazil	1h00min16s
30	Ivani Gomes dos Santos	Brazil	1h00min51s
31	Euseli de Assis Batista	Brazil	1h00min56s
32	Adriana Aparecida da Silva	Brazil	1h01min26s
33	Yolanda Quinbita	Ecuador	1h01min37s
34	Elizabete Ferreira Cruz	Brazil	1h01min42s
35	Cristine Jobim	Brazil	1h02min
36	Maria Fátima Jesus Batz	Brazil	1h02min26s
37	Marinalva da Costa Souto	Brazil	1h02min33s
38	Raimunda Brito da Fonseca	Brazil	1h02min45s
39	Maria Cilene da Rocha	Brazil	1h02min42s
40	Itamar Gonçalves Aranha	Brazil	1h03min05s

For a complete record, with all the 750 runners that qualified in the official results board, please visit the official website referenced below.
