= 2004 South American Cross Country Championships =

- Organisers: CONSUDATLE
- Edition: 19th
- Date: February 14–15
- Host city: Macaé, Rio de Janeiro, Brazil
- Venue: Forte Marechal Hermes
- Events: 8
- Distances: 12 km – Senior men 4 km – Men's short 8 km – Junior men (U20); 4 km – Youth men (U18); 8 km – Senior women 4 km – Women's short 6 km – Junior women (U20); 3 km – Youth women (U18)
- Participation: 89 athletes from 10 nations

The 2004 South American Cross Country Championships took place on February 14–15, 2004. The races were held at the Forte Marechal Hermes in Macaé, Brazil.

Complete results, results for junior and youth competitions, and medal winners were published.

== Medallists ==
Event	Gold		Silver		Bronze	
Individual
Senior men (12 km)	Byron Piedra; Ecuador	36:44	Juan Osvaldo Suárez; Argentina	36:50	Claudir Rodrigues; Brazil	36:53
Men's short (4 km)	Juan Osvaldo Suárez; Argentina	11:26	Byron Piedra; Ecuador	11:27	Celso Ficagna; Brazil	11:29
Junior (U20) men (8 km)	Jhon Cusi (Peru) Perú	25:10	Gilialdo Koball; Brazil	25:40	Enzo Yañez; Chile	25:49
Youth (U18) men (4 km)	Felipe dos Santos Prado; Brazil	12:49	Luís Felipe Leite Barbosa; Brazil	13:03	Jean Pierre Campos Ferrugem; Brazil	13:08
Senior women (8 km)	Maria Lúcia Alves Vieira; Brazil	28:32	Elena Guerra; Uruguay	28:42	Roxana Preussler; Argentina	29:08
Women's short (4 km)	Susana Rebolledo; Chile	13:35	Rosa Apaza; Bolivia	13:39	Elena Guerra; Uruguay	13:44
Junior (U20) women (6 km)	Inés Melchor (Peru) Perú	21:43	Michele Cristina das Chagas; Brazil	21:54	Vianka Pereira; Bolivia	22:32
Youth (U18) women (3 km)	Sabine Letícia Heitling; Brazil	10:24	Michele Cristina das Chagas; Brazil	10:41	Gerlane Iara da Silva; Brazil	11:10
Team
Senior men	Ecuador	16	Brazil	19	Argentina	25
Men's short	Ecuador	16	Argentina	17	Brazil	18
Junior (U20) men	Brazil	6				
Youth (U18) men	Brazil	6				
Senior women	Brazil	10	Argentina	11	Paraguay	24
Women's short	Argentina	9	Brazil	12	Paraguay	24
Junior (U20) women	Brazil	6				
Youth (U18) women	Brazil	6				

== Race results ==
=== Senior men's race (12 km) ===
Individual race
Rank	Athlete	Country	Time
1st place, gold medalist(s)	Byron Piedra	Ecuador	36:44
2nd place, silver medalist(s)	Juan Osvaldo Suárez	Argentina	36:50
3rd place, bronze medalist(s)	Claudir Rodrigues	Brazil	36:53
4	Jonathan Monje	Chile	36:56
5	Reynaldo Ramírez	(Peru) Perú	37:08
6	Wellington Correia Fraga	Brazil	37:12
7	Jorge Cabrera	Paraguay	37:23
8	Edgar Chancusig	Ecuador	37:38
9	Richard Arias	Ecuador	38:19
10	Patricio Contreras	Chile	38:34
11	Miguel Angel Bárzola	Argentina	38:34
12	Gustavo Caurio	Brazil	38:44
13	Alejandro Semprún	Venezuela	39:25
14	César Pilaluisa	Ecuador	39:27
15	Ulises Sanguinetti	Argentina	39:40
16	Ernesto Zamora	Uruguay	39:55
17	Robinson Pérez	Venezuela	40:02
18	Vasmiro Alves	Brazil	40:30
19	Sebastián Pino	Chile	40:40
20	Sergio Lobos	Chile	41:15
21	Orlando Sandoval	Venezuela	41:50
22	Nelson Zamora	Uruguay	42:30
23	Gustavo López	Paraguay	42:56
24	César Herrera	Paraguay	43:10
25	Valentín Valdovinos	Paraguay	51:00
—	Gilson Vieira da Silva	Brazil	DNF
—	Enicio Pereira Maximiano	Brazil	DNF
—	César Troncoso	Argentina	DNF
—	Manuel Bellorín	Venezuela	DNF

Teams
Rank	Team	Points
1st place, gold medalist(s)	Ecuador: Byron Piedra / 1; Edgar Chancusig / 7; Richard Arias / 8; (César Pilaluisa) / (n/s)	16
2nd place, silver medalist(s)	Brazil: Claudir Rodrigues / 3; Wellington Correia Fraga / 5; Gustavo Caurio / 11; (Vasmiro Alves) / (n/s); (Gilson Vieira da Silva) / (DNF); (Enicio Pereira Maximiano) / (DNF)	19
3rd place, bronze medalist(s)	Argentina: Juan Osvaldo Suárez / 2; Miguel Angel Bárzola / 10; Ulises Sanguinetti / 13; (César Troncoso) / (DNF)	25
4	Chile: Jonathan Monje / 4; Patricio Contreras / 9; Sebastián Pino / 15; (Sergio Lobos) / (n/s)	28
5	Paraguay: Jorge Cabrera / 6; Gustavo López / 17; César Herrera / 18; (Valentín Valdovinos) / (n/s)	41
6	Venezuela: Alejandro Semprún / 12; Robinson Pérez / 14; Orlando Sandoval / 16; (Manuel Bellorín) / (DNF)	42

- Note: Athletes in parentheses did not score for the team result. (n/s: nonscorer)

=== Men's short race (4 km) ===
Individual race
Rank	Athlete	Country	Time
1st place, gold medalist(s)	Juan Osvaldo Suárez	Argentina	11:26
2nd place, silver medalist(s)	Byron Piedra	Ecuador	11:27
3rd place, bronze medalist(s)	Celso Ficagna	Brazil	11:29
4	Emerson Jose de Souza	Brazil	11:32
5	Jonathan Monje	Chile	11:37
6	Richard Arias	Ecuador	11:44
7	César Troncoso	Argentina	11:48
8	Edgar Chancusig	Ecuador	11:53
9	Miguel Angel Bárzola	Argentina	11:56
10	Alejandro Semprún	Venezuela	11:57
11	César Pilaluisa	Ecuador	11:58
12	Fabiano Peçanha	Brazil	12:03
13	Sergio Lobos	Chile	12:06
14	Manuel Bellorín	Venezuela	12:08
15	Jorge Cabrera	Paraguay	12:09
16	Patricio Contreras	Chile	12:13
17	Ernesto Zamora	Uruguay	12:13
18	Gustavo Caurio	Brazil	12:13
19	Robinson Pérez	Venezuela	12:14
20	Ulises Sanguinetti	Argentina	12:18
21	Sebastián Pino	Chile	12:21
22	Orlando Sandoval	Venezuela	12:23
23	Márcio Ribeiro da Silva	Brazil	12:54
24	Vinícius José Campos Lopes	Brazil	12:59
25	Gustavo López	Paraguay	13:03
26	César Hererra	Paraguay	13:39
27	Valentín Valdovinos	Paraguay	13:49

Teams
Rank	Team	Points
1st place, gold medalist(s)	Ecuador: Byron Piedra / 2; Richard Arias / 6; Edgar Chancusig / 8; (César Pilaluisa) / (n/s)	16
2nd place, silver medalist(s)	Argentina: Juan Osvaldo Suárez / 1; César Troncoso / 7; Miguel Angel Bárzola / 9; (Ulises Sanguinetti) / (n/s)	17
3rd place, bronze medalist(s)	Brazil: Celso Ficagna / 3; Emerson Jose de Souza / 4; Fabiano Peçanha / 11; (Gustavo Caurio) / (n/s); (Márcio Ribeiro da Silva) / (n/s); (Vinícius José Campos Lopes) / (n/s)	18
4	Chile: Jonathan Monje / 5; Sergio Lobos / 12; Patricio Contreras / 15; (Sebastián Pino) / (n/s)	32
5	Venezuela: Alejandro Semprún / 10; Manuel Bellorín / 13; Robinson Pérez / 16; (Orlando Sandoval) / (n/s)	39
6	Paraguay: Jorge Cabrera / 14; Gustavo López / 17; César Hererra / 18; (Valentín Valdovinos) / (n/s)	49

- Note: Athletes in parentheses did not score for the team result. (n/s: nonscorer)

=== Junior (U20) men's race (8 km) ===
Individual race
Rank	Athlete	Country	Time
1st place, gold medalist(s)	Jhon Cusi	(Peru) Perú	25:10
2nd place, silver medalist(s)	Gilialdo Koball	Brazil	25:40
3rd place, bronze medalist(s)	Enzo Yañez	Chile	25:49
4	Éder Uillian Oliveira da Silva	Brazil	26:16
5	João Augusto Stingelin	Brazil	26:24
6	Alison Vieira Gonçalves	Brazil	26:28
7	Marcelo Barbosa de Souza	Brazil	26:48
8	Germán Pinilla	Colombia	27:06
9	Pablo Mena	Chile	27:32
10	Gilfran das Chagas Rodrigues	Brazil	28:13
11	Aldo Franco	Paraguay	29:02

Teams
Rank

Team
Brazil

Gilialdo Koball	1
Éder Uillian Oliveira da Silva	2
João Augusto Stingelin	3
(Alison Vieira Gonçalves)	(n/s)
(Marcelo Barbosa de Souza)	(n/s)
(Gilfran das Chagas Rodrigues)	(n/s)

Points
6

- Note: Athletes in parentheses did not score for the team result. (n/s: nonscorer)

=== Youth (U18) men's race (4 km) ===
Individual race
Rank	Athlete	Country	Time
1st place, gold medalist(s)	Felipe dos Santos Prado	Brazil	12:49
2nd place, silver medalist(s)	Luís Felipe Leite Barbosa	Brazil	13:03
3rd place, bronze medalist(s)	Jean Pierre Campos Ferrugem	Brazil	13:08
4	Miguel Angel Soto	Chile	13:24
5	Diego Koball	Brazil	13:33
6	Adão Marcelo Ferreira dos Santos	Brazil	13:47
7	Aldo Franco	Paraguay	14:10

Teams
Rank

Team
Brazil

Felipe dos Santos Prado	1
Luís Felipe Leite Barbosa	2
Jean Pierre Campos Ferrugem	3
(Diego Koball)	(n/s)
(Adão Marcelo Ferreira dos Santos)	(n/s)

Points
6

- Note: Athletes in parentheses did not score for the team result. (n/s: nonscorer)

=== Senior women's race (8 km) ===
Individual race
Rank	Athlete	Country	Time
1st place, gold medalist(s)	Maria Lúcia Alves Vieira	Brazil	28:32
2nd place, silver medalist(s)	Elena Guerra	Uruguay	28:42
3rd place, bronze medalist(s)	Roxana Preussler	Argentina	29:08
4	Elizabete Ferreira Cruz	Brazil	29:15
5	Rosa Apaza	Bolivia	29:41
6	Raquel Maraviglia	Argentina	30:32
7	Karina Córdoba	Argentina	30:54
8	Giovanna Rodrigues Costa	Brazil	32:07
9	Adriana Maria Serafin	Brazil	32:36
10	Ana Paula Díaz	Uruguay	33:59
11	Carmen Moral	Paraguay	34:12
12	Lilian López	Paraguay	35:11
13	Ana Sandoval	Paraguay	38:46
—	María Peralta	Argentina	DNF
—	Queila Maria de Jesus	Brazil	DNF

Teams
Rank	Team	Points
1st place, gold medalist(s)	Brazil: Maria Lúcia Alves Vieira / 1; Elizabete Ferreira Cruz / 3; Giovanna Rodrigues Costa / 6; (Adriana Maria Serafin) / (n/s); (Queila Maria de Jesus) / (DNF)	10
2nd place, silver medalist(s)	Argentina: Roxana Preussler / 2; Raquel Maraviglia / 4; Karina Córdoba / 5; (María Peralta) / (DNF)	11
3rd place, bronze medalist(s)	Paraguay: Carmen Moral / 7; Lilian López / 8; Ana Sandoval / 9	24

- Note: Athletes in parentheses did not score for the team result. (n/s: nonscorer)

=== Women's short race (4 km) ===
Individual race
Rank	Athlete	Country	Time
1st place, gold medalist(s)	Susana Rebolledo	Chile	13:35
2nd place, silver medalist(s)	Rosa Apaza	Bolivia	13:39
3rd place, bronze medalist(s)	Elena Guerra	Uruguay	13:44
4	Maria Lúcia Alves Vieira	Brazil	13:47
5	Roxana Preussler	Argentina	13:48
6	María de los Ángeles Peralta	Argentina	13:49
7	Raquel Maraviglia	Argentina	13:49
8	Elizabete Ferreira Cruz	Brazil	14:05
9	Gisele Barros de Jesus	Brazil	14:37
10	Giovanna Rodrigues Costa	Brazil	14:44
11	Magda Margarete Azevedo	Brazil	14:54
12	Adriana Maria Serafin	Brazil	15:12
13	Ana Paula Díaz	Uruguay	15:37
14	Carmen Moral	Paraguay	15:56
15	Lilian Nuñez	Paraguay	17:01
16	Ana Sandoval	Paraguay	18:28
—	Karina Córdoba	Argentina	DNF

Teams
Rank	Team	Points
1st place, gold medalist(s)	Argentina: Roxana Preussler / 2; María de los Ángeles Peralta / 3; Raquel Maraviglia / 4; (Karina Córdoba) / (DNF)	9
2nd place, silver medalist(s)	Brazil: Maria Lúcia Alves Vieira / 1; Elizabete Ferreira Cruz / 5; Gisele Barros de Jesus / 6; (Giovanna Rodrigues Costa) / (n/s); (Magda Margarete Azevedo) / (n/s); (Adriana Maria Serafin) / (n/s)	12
3rd place, bronze medalist(s)	Paraguay: Carmen Moral / 7; Lilian Nuñez / 8; Ana Sandoval / 9	24

- Note: Athletes in parentheses did not score for the team result. (n/s: nonscorer)

=== Junior (U20) women's race (6 km) ===
Individual race
Rank	Athlete	Country	Time
1st place, gold medalist(s)	Inés Melchor	(Peru) Perú	21:43
2nd place, silver medalist(s)	Michele Cristina das Chagas	Brazil	21:54
3rd place, bronze medalist(s)	Vianka Pereira	Bolivia	22:32
4	Sabine Leticia Heitling	Brazil	22:35
5	Gina Paola García	Colombia	23:04
6	Cristiane da Silva Oliveira	Brazil	23:16
7	Edna Kaline de Oliveira Souza	Brazil	23:19
8	Isabel Lobos	Chile	23:50
9	Elizabeth Choquevillca	Bolivia	24:04
10	Iris Ribeiro do Nascimento	Brazil	24:33
11	Viviana Freitas	Paraguay	25:18
—	Zenaide Vieira	Brazil	DNF

Teams
Rank

Team
Brazil

Michele Cristina das Chagas	1
Sabine Leticia Heitling	2
Cristiane da Silva Oliveira	3
(Edna Kaline de Oliveira Souza)	(n/s)
(Iris Ribeiro do Nascimento)	(n/s)
(Zenaide Vieira)	(DNF)

Points
6

- Note: Athletes in parentheses did not score for the team result. (n/s: nonscorer)

=== Youth (U18) women's race (3 km) ===
Individual race
Rank	Athlete	Country	Time
1st place, gold medalist(s)	Sabine Letícia Heitling	Brazil	10:24
2nd place, silver medalist(s)	Michele Cristina das Chagas	Brazil	10:41
3rd place, bronze medalist(s)	Gerlane Iara da Silva	Brazil	11:10
4	Cynthia Ubilla	Chile	11:31
5	Thandara Regina Coutinho de Freitas Santos	Brazil	11:43
6	Maristela Aparecida da Cunha	Brazil	12:00
7	Marciane Simões	Brazil	12:44

Teams
Rank

Team
Brazil

Sabine Letícia Heitling	1
Michele Cristina das Chagas	2
Gerlane Iara da Silva	3
(Thandara Regina Coutinho de Freitas Santos)	(n/s)
(Maristela Aparecida da Cunha)	(n/s)
(Marciane Simões)	(n/s)

Points
6

- Note: Athletes in parentheses did not score for the team result. (n/s: nonscorer)

== Medal table (unofficial) ==
* Host nation (Brazil)

Rank	Nation	Gold	Silver	Bronze	Total
1	Brazil (BRA)*	8	6	5	19
2	Ecuador (ECU)	3	1	0	4
3	Argentina (ARG)	2	3	2	7
4	Peru (PER)	2	0	0	2
5	Chile (CHI)	1	0	1	2
6	Bolivia (BOL)	0	1	1	2
6	Uruguay (URU)	0	1	1	2
8	Paraguay (PAR)	0	0	2	2
Totals (8 entries)		16	12	12	40

- Note: Totals include both individual and team medals, with medals in the team competition counting as one medal.

== Participation ==
According to an unofficial count, 89 athletes from 10 countries participated.

- Argentina (8)
- Bolivia (3)
- Brazil (40)
- Chile (10)
- Colombia (2)
- Ecuador (4)
- Paraguay (11)
- (Peru) Perú (3)
- Uruguay (4)
- Venezuela (4)

== See also ==
- 2004 in athletics (track and field)
