= 1995 South American Junior Championships in Athletics =

XXVII South American Junior Championships in Athletics
- Dates: September 5–7
- Host city: Santiago, Chile
- Level: Junior
- Events: 43
- Participation: about 207 athletes from 10 nations

The 27th South American Junior Championships in Athletics were held in Santiago, Chile from September 5–7, 1995.

== Participation (unofficial) ==
Detailed result lists can be found on the "World Junior Athletics History" website. An unofficial count yields the number of about 207 athletes from about 10 countries: Argentina (33), Bolivia (2), Brazil (62), Chile (51), Colombia (16), Ecuador (14), Paraguay (2), Peru (7), Uruguay (14), Venezuela (6).

== Medal summary ==
Medal winners are published for men and women Complete results can be found on the "World Junior Athletics History" website.

=== Men ===
Event	Gold		Silver		Bronze	
100 metres	Evandro Tristão (BRA)	10.93	Carlos Barbosa (VEN)	10.96	Édson Nascimento (BRA)	11.01
200 metres	Paulo Poersch (BRA)	21.94	Evandro Tristão (BRA)	22.04	Carlos Barbosa (VEN)	22.04
400 metres	Víctor Hugo Goulart (BRA)	48.05	Gustavo Aguirre (ARG)	48.19	Carlos Zbinden (CHI)	48.88
800 metres	Márcio da Silva (BRA)	1:50.12	Eronilde Almeida (BRA)	1:52.47	César Suárez (COL)	1:52.77
1500 metres	Márcio da Silva (BRA)	3:53.07	Hudson de Souza (BRA)	3:53.28	Darío Núñez (ARG)	3:55.64
5000 metres	Clodoaldo da Silva (BRA)	14:33.66	Marílson dos Santos (BRA)	14:36.88	José Carrasco (COL)	14:47.61
10,000 metres	Paulo Lunkes (BRA)	30:54.23	José Carrasco (COL)	30:58.18	Jaime Gaete (CHI)	32:07.39
110 metres hurdles	José David Riesco (PER)	14.86	Carlos Vega (CHI)	15.02	Marco Silva (BRA)	15.18
400 metres hurdles	Alexander Mena (COL)	52.18	Cleber da Silva (BRA)	52.53	Édson Hernandes (BRA)	52.85
3000 metres steeplechase	Julián Peralta (ARG)	9:03.38	Ramiro Nogueira (BRA)	9:07.63	Rômulo da Silva (BRA)	9:12.78
4 × 100 metres relay	Brazil; Cleber da Silva; Evandro de Tristão; Édson Nascimento; Paulo Poersch	41.79	Chile; Andres Illanes; Gonzalo Arenas; Ives Bayard; Carlos Vega	42.71	Colombia; Luis Palomeque; Alexander Mena; Vladimir Zape; César Suárez	43.40
4 × 400 metres relay	Brazil; Edson dos Reis; Eronilde de Almeida; Cleber da Silva; Víctor Goulart	3:13.01	Colombia; César Suárez; Leisnes Aragón; Vladimir Zape; Alexander Mena	3:16.20	Argentina; Martín Espíndola; Gustavo Blanco; Rafael Iturrioz; Gustavo Aguirre	3:16.63
10,000 metres track walk	Nixon Zambrano (COL)	43:36.13	Sidney Rodrigues (BRA)	44:30.81	Omar Aguirre (ECU)	45:10.96
High jump	Felipe Apablaza (CHI)	2.13	Erasmo Jara (ARG)	2.11	Fabrício Romero (BRA)	2.09
Pole vault	Sebastián Ortiz (URU)	4.55	José Escalona (VEN)	4.45	Henrique Martins (BRA)	4.25
Long jump	Sérgio dos Santos (BRA)	7.19	José Reyes (VEN)	7.15	Christian Stahl (URU)	7.02
Triple jump	Gustavo Pinto (BRA)	16.36	José Reyes (VEN)	15.33	Márcio Cardoso (BRA)	15.11
Shot put	Marco Antonio Verni (CHI)	16.04	Wilson Wilchez (COL)	15.00	Francisco Pinter (ARG)	14.32
Discus throw	Andrés Calvo (ARG)	45.98	Juan Cerra (ARG)	44.40	Marco Antonio Verni (CHI)	44.02
Hammer throw	Juan Cerra (ARG)	67.12	Sebastián Balasina (ARG)	54.14	Marcos dos Santos (BRA)	52.70
Javelin throw	Francisco Galotto (ARG)	61.16	Pedro Prando (BRA)	60.60	Luis Palomeque (COL)	58.94
Decathlon	Moisés Pereira (BRA)	6407	Alejandro Acosta (ARG)	6390	Alberto Miethe (CHI)	6196

=== Women ===
Event	Gold		Silver		Bronze	
100 metres	Paola Restrepo (COL)	12.14	Helena Guerrero (COL)	12.14	Irene Boldrim (BRA)	12.15
200 metres	Helena Guerrero (COL)	24.71	Daniella Janzen (BRA)	24.76	María Laura Rodríguez (ARG)	24.84
400 metres	Karina Soto (ARG)	55.79	Anice Schoulten (BRA)	56.78	Sandra Ferreira (BRA)	57.26
800 metres	Natalia Rivarola (ARG)	2:16.68	Rosa Hernández (CHI)	2:18.13	Susana Rebolledo (CHI)	2:18.68
1500 metres	Bertha Sánchez (COL)	4:30.9	Erika Olivera (CHI)	4:35.0	Fabiana Cristine da Silva (BRA)	4:39.4
3000 metres	Erika Olivera (CHI)	9:30.73	Bertha Sánchez (COL)	10:05.42	Fabiana Cristine da Silva (BRA)	10:14.99
10,000 metres	Erika Olivera (CHI)	35:27.33	Helena dos Santos (BRA)	36:46.25	Lucimara da Silva (BRA)	39:58.31
100 metres hurdles	Irene Boldrim (BRA)	14.29	Gilda Massa (PER)	14.62	Cora Olivero (ARG)	15.44
400 metres hurdles	Ondina Rodríguez (ECU)	61.45	Silvana de Santana (BRA)	62.28	Sarita Figueras (URU)	62.57
4 × 100 metres relay	Brazil; Anice Schoulten; Irene Boldrim; Alessandra Ferreira; Daniele Janzen	46.77	Chile; Consuelo Arristia; Gigiola Rivera; Mónica López; Macarena Hargous	48.54	Ecuador; Eliana Arangono; Ondina Rodríguez; Zulay Nazareno; Ana Caicedo	48.83
4 × 400 metres relay	Brazil; Anice Schoulten; Da Silva; Silvana de Santana; Sandra Ferreira	3:50.86	Uruguay; Sarita Figueras; Alejandra Monza; Rocío Cabrera; Karina Soto	3:51.98	Chile; Macarena Hargous; Catherine Aravena; Carolina Matesic; Jessica Brito	3:55.30
5000 metres track walk	Ángela Aliaga (BOL)	24:34.06	Tânia Spindler (BRA)	24:54.22	Nohora Paque (COL)	25:06.84
High jump	Luciane Dambacher (BRA)	1.76	Solange Witteveen (ARG)	1.74	Gisela Pfeiffer (ARG)	1.74
Pole vault	Márcia Hennemann (BRA)	2.81	Paola Penna (URU)	2.65	Solange Witteveen (ARG)	2.60
Long jump	Gilda Massa (PER)	5.71	Helena Guerrero (COL)	5.67	Solange Witteveen (ARG)	5.64
Triple jump	Sorileny Quintero (VEN)	12.68	Adriana Matoso (BRA)	12.38	Eyda Rentería (COL)	11.77
Shot put	Josiane Soares (BRA)	13.95	Fanny García (VEN)	12.98	María Wals (ARG)	12.16
Discus throw	Fanny García (VEN)	47.96	María Eugenia Giggi (ARG)	44.52	Bárbara Lewin (CHI)	42.54
Hammer throw	Josiane Soares (BRA)	43.78	María Wals (ARG)	43.76	Solange Durante (ARG)	43.62
Javelin throw	Claudineia Barreto (BRA)	47.94	Sabina Moya (COL)	47.90	Patricia Alonso (VEN)	46.86
Heptathlon	Kátia da Silva (BRA)	4703	Jaqueline Vianna (BRA)	4378	Paula Palma (CHI)	3637

== Medal table (unofficial) ==
* Host nation (Chile)

Rank	Nation	Gold	Silver	Bronze	Total
1	Brazil	21	15	13	49
2	Argentina	6	8	10	24
3	Colombia	5	7	6	18
4	Chile*	4	5	8	17
5	Venezuela	2	5	2	9
6	Peru	2	1	0	3
7	Uruguay	1	2	2	5
8	Ecuador	1	0	2	3
9	Bolivia	1	0	0	1
Totals (9 entries)		43	43	43	129
