= Inés Melchor =

Peruvian long-distance runner (born 1986)

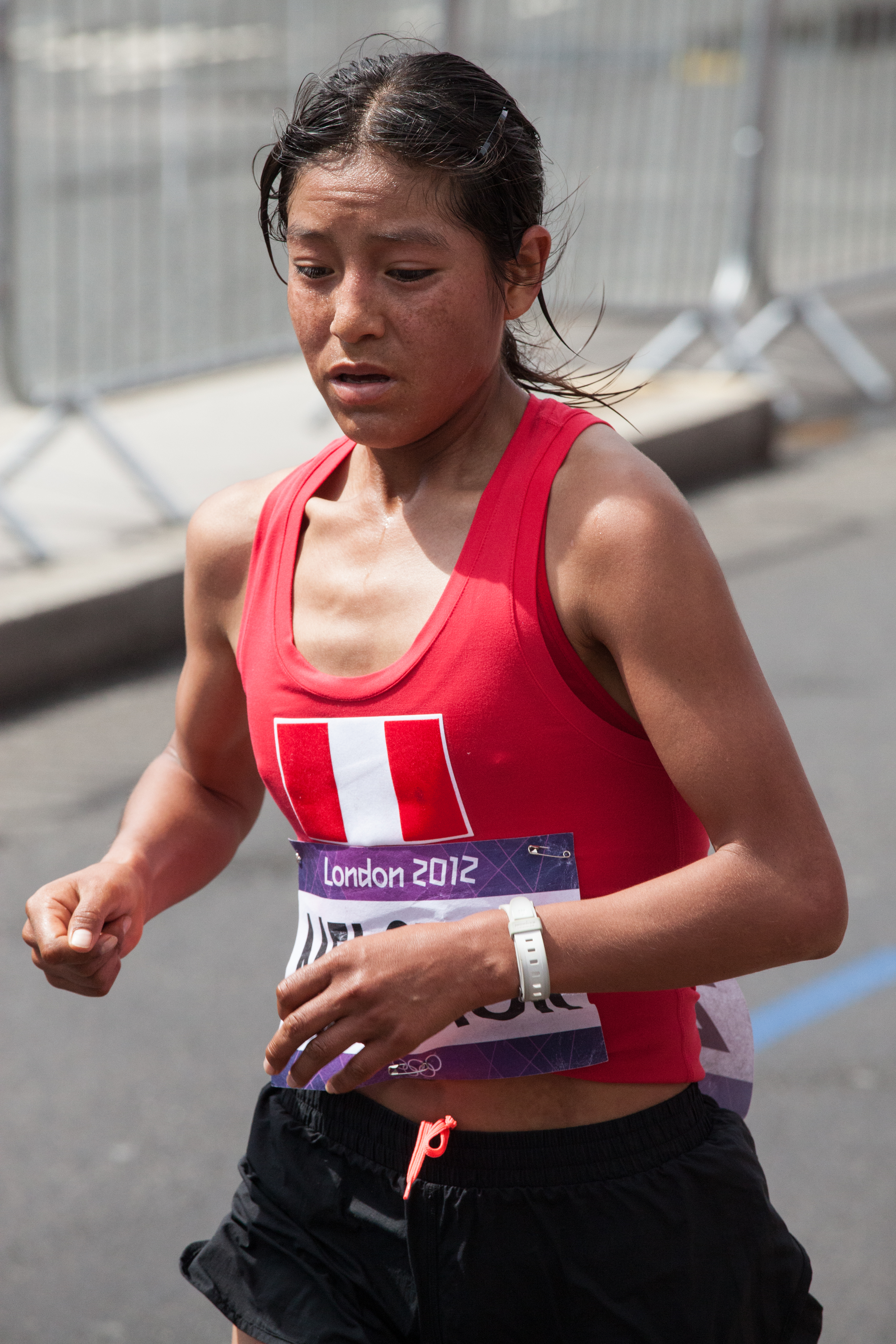
- Inés Melchor at the 2012 Summer Olympics Marathon

Personal information
- Full name: Santa Inés Melchor Huiza
- Born: 30 August 1986 (age 39) Acobambilla, Huancavelica, Peru
- Height: 1.58 m (5 ft 2 in)
- Weight: 55 kg (121 lb)

Sport
- Country: Peru
- Sport: athletics
- Event: Long-distance running

Achievements and titles
- Personal bests: Half marathon: 1:14:3; Marathon: 2:26:48
Medal record
Women's athletics
Representing Peru
South American Championships
Gold medal – first place	2009 Lima	5000 m
Gold medal – first place	2009 Lima	10,000 m
Pan American Games
Bronze medal – third place	2011 Guadalajara	5000 m
- Updated on 29 July 2013

Inés Melchor (born August 30, 1986) is a Peruvian long-distance runner. She competed in the marathon at the 2012 Summer Olympics, placing 25th with a time of 2:28:54. In September 2014 she placed 8th at the Berlin Marathon with a time of 2:26.48, new Peruvian national record and the South America area record. Melchor also holds Peruvian records for the 5000 and 10,000 metres on the track.

She won numerous youth and junior medals at the continental level and competed at the 2003 World Championships in Athletics and the 2004 Summer Olympics while still a teenager. She won a gold medal double in the 5000 m and 10,000 m at the 2009 South American Championships in Athletics. She also won the bronze medal in the 5000 m at the 2011 Pan American Games. She is a three-time champion at the South American Cross Country Championships.

== Biography ==
=== Early life ===
Inés Melchor, or her complete name is Santa Inés Melchor Huiza, was born in 1986 in Acobambilla District, Huancavelica Province, Peru.

She was only three months old, when her parents decided to move to Huancayo. There, Inés attended local school in Nuestra Señora del Cocharcas and eventually earned a bachelor of laws from Los Andes Peruvian University.

=== Youth and junior career ===
Melchor emerged as one of South America's most promising long-distance runners at an early age. She was the 3000 metres silver medallist at the 2000 South American Youth Championships in Athletics at the age of thirteen. The following year she won the 5000 metres title at the 2001 South American Junior Championships in Athletics (also taking 3000 m bronze), and then won the 3000 m title and 5000 m silver at the Pan American Juniors a week later.

As the youngest in the field at the 2002 South American Junior Championships, both Nadia Rodríguez and Silvia Paredes (two and three years older than Melchor) got the better of her and the Peruvian left with only a 3000 m bronze medal. In the younger age bracket she won the 3000 m at the South American Youth Championships and also managed a bronze in the 1500 metres.

Melchor was dominant regionally in 2003: aged sixteen, she won both the 3000 m and 5000 m titles at the South American Juniors and the Pan American Juniors. At the 2003 World Youth Championships in Athletics 3000 m race she was the best performer from the Americas, taking sixth overall. Such was her talent, she was one of a handful of Peruvian entrants for the 2003 World Championships in Athletics, where she ran in the 5000 metres.

In 2004, she won her first junior title at the South American Cross Country Championships. She was the only runner from the Americas in the 3000 m at the 2004 World Junior Championships in Athletics and placed eleventh. The seventeen-year-old made her Olympic debut for Peru at the 2004 Athens Olympics, competing in the first round of the 5000 m. She was the youngest of only twelve Peruvians present at the games. She also placed ninth in the 3000 m at the 2004 Ibero-American Championships in Athletics that year.

She was South America's best performer in the junior race at the 2005 IAAF World Cross Country Championships, coming 29th overall. In her last year of junior eligibility she won a 3000/5000 m double at the South American Juniors. She was the 5000 m champion at the Pan American Juniors but was beaten into second in the 3000 m by Canada's Alyson Kohlmeier.

=== Start of senior career ===
In her first year of senior competition, she competed sparingly, with her main appearance being 72nd in the long race at the 2006 IAAF World Cross Country Championships after a victory at the South American Cross Country . The following year saw her make a breakthrough as a senior runner. She was runner-up at the South American Cross Country behind Ednalva Laureano da Silva. At her first continental senior championships she was fifth in the 5000 m but took the 10,000 metres silver medal behind Lucélia Peres. At the Pan American Games she ran in the 10,000 m and broke Marilu Salazar's fourteen-year-old Peruvian record with a time of 33:36.17 minutes for fifth place.

In 2008, she won her second senior title at the South American Cross Country and did a 5000/10,000 m double at the national championships, breaking Faustina Huamani's 5000 m national record in the process with a time of 16:17.37 minutes. She went unchallenged in either event at the 2008 South American Under-23 Championships in Athletics, held in Lima and left with two gold medals.

=== South American titles ===
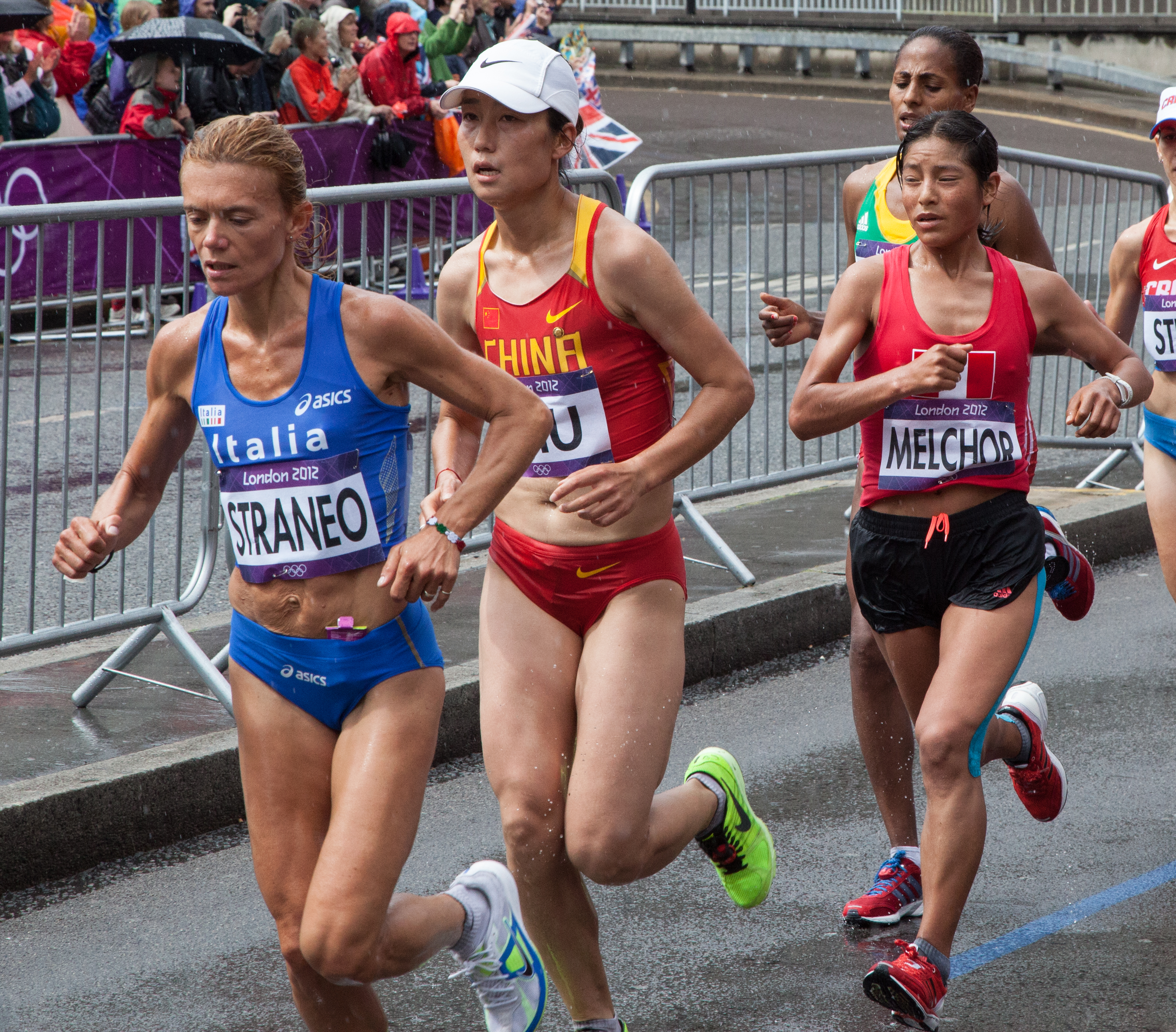
Melchor (right) racing in the 2012 Olympic marathon.

She reduced her national records further at the 2009 South American Championships in Athletics held on home turf in Lima. She established herself as the region's best distance runner as she won the 5000 m with a time of 16:00.41 minutes and the 10,000 m with a time of 33:11.79 minutes (also a championship record).

She ran in the 5000 m heats at the 2009 World Championships in Athletics later that year and tried out a new event at the 2009 IAAF World Half Marathon Championships, where she was 40th in a personal best of 74:33 minutes. She ended her year with a 10,000 m win at the Bolivarian Games.

In 2010, she won the South American cross country title for a third time, but did not compete for the rest of the year. She returned to action near the end of 2011 and claimed the 5000 m bronze medal at the 2011 Pan American Games.

=== Marathon running ===
Melchor moved up to the marathon distance in the 2012 season. Every year she runs about two or three marathons a year. Also she runs short races during the year. She made her debut at the Seoul International Marathon and her time of 2:30:04 hours for sixth was a Peruvian marathon record. This qualified her for the 2012 Summer Olympics in London. She improved her national record further at the competition, completing a run of 2:28:54 hours for 25th place. At the closing ceremony she was the flag bearer for Peru.

In 2013, she placed third at the Santiago Marathon, won the Ultimas Noticias 15K in Ecuador, and was runner-up at the Bogotá Half Marathon. On April 12, 2015, she won the Santiago Marathon which confirmed her qualification for the 2016 Summer Olympics in Rio de Janeiro.

== Personal bests ==
- 1500 m: 4:30.78 – Alcalá de Henares, 4 July 2004
- 3000 m: 9:28.44 – Sherbrooke, 9 July 2003
- 5000 m: 15:30.63 NR – Trujillo, 28 November 2013
- 10,000 m: 33:07.75 – Lima, 6 October 2013
- Half marathon: 1:12:31 – Medellín, 8 September 2013
- Marathon: 2:26.48 NR - Berlin, 28 September 2014

== Achievements ==
Year	Competition	Venue	Position	Event	Notes
Representing Peru
2000	South American Youth Championships	Bogotá, Colombia	2nd	3000 m	10:40.67 min A
2001	South American Junior Championships	Santa Fe, Argentina	3rd	3000 m	10:12.99
2001	South American Junior Championships	Santa Fe, Argentina	1st	5000 m	17:14.49
2001	Pan American Junior Championships	Santa Fe, Argentina	1st	3000 m	10:11.50
2001	Pan American Junior Championships	Santa Fe, Argentina	2nd	5000 m	17:28.18
2002	South American Junior Championships / South American Games	Belém, Brazil	3rd	3000m	10:05.60
2002	South American Junior Championships / South American Games	Belém, Brazil	4th	5000m	17:49.04
2002	South American Youth Championships	Asunción, Paraguay	3rd	1500 m	4:44.94
2002	South American Youth Championships	Asunción, Paraguay	1st	3000 m	10:19.43
2003	South American Junior Championships	Guayaquil, Ecuador	1st	3000 m	9:58.83
2003	South American Junior Championships	Guayaquil, Ecuador	1st	5000 m	16:57.0
2003	World Youth Championships	Sherbrooke, Canada	6th	3000 m	9:28.44
2003	Pan American Junior Championships	Bridgetown, Barbados	1st	3000 m	9:57.96
2003	Pan American Junior Championships	Bridgetown, Barbados	1st	5000 m	16:53.37
2003	World Championships	Saint-Denis, France	15th (h)	5000 m	17:17.90
2004	South American Cross Country Championships – Junior	Macaé, Brazil	1st	6.0 km	21:43
2004	World Junior Championships	Grosseto, Italy	11th	3000 m	9:41.89
2004	Ibero-American Championships	Huelva, Spain	9th	3000 m	9:37.35
2004	Olympic Games	Athens, Greece	38th (h)	5000 m	17:08.07
2005	South American Cross Country Championships – Junior	Montevideo, Uruguay	2nd	6.0 km	22:19
2005	World Cross Country Championships – Junior	Saint-Galmier, France	29th	6.153 km	22:33
2005	Pan American Junior Championships	Windsor, Canada	2nd	3000 m	9:36.24
2005	Pan American Junior Championships	Windsor, Canada	1st	5000 m	16:48.06
2005	South American Junior Championships	Rosario, Argentina	1st	3000 m	9:50.87
2005	South American Junior Championships	Rosario, Argentina	1st	5000 m	17:05.78
2006	South American Cross Country Championships	Mar del Plata, Argentina	1st	8.0 km	27:55
2006	World Cross Country Championships	Fukuoka, Japan	72nd	8.0 km	28:49
2006	South American U23 Championships / South American Games	Buenos Aires, Argentina	6th	5000m	17:16.39
2006	South American U23 Championships / South American Games	Buenos Aires, Argentina	4th	10,000m	35:57.85
2007	South American Cross Country Championships	Rio de Janeiro, Brazil	2nd	8.0 km	29:34
2007	South American Championships	São Paulo, Brazil	5th	5000 m	16:23.44
2007	South American Championships	São Paulo, Brazil	2nd	10,000 m	34:13.23
2007	Pan American Games	Rio de Janeiro, Brazil	5th	10,000 m	33:36.17
2008	South American Cross Country Championships	Asunción, Paraguay	1st	8.0 km	28:19
2008	South American U23 Championships	Lima, Peru	4th	1500m	4:38.36 A
2008	South American U23 Championships	Lima, Peru	1st	5000m	16:44.59 A
2008	South American U23 Championships	Lima, Peru	1st	10,000m	35:43.27 A
2009	South American Cross Country Championships	Concepción, Chile	3rd	8.0 km	28:25
2009	South American Championships	Lima, Peru	1st	5000 m	16:00.41
2009	South American Championships	Lima, Peru	1st	10,000 m	33:11.79
2009	World Championships	Berlin, Germany	20th (h)	5000 m	16:00.83
2009	World Half Marathon Championships	Birmingham, United Kingdom	40th	Half marathon	1:14:33
2009	Bolivarian Games	Sucre, Bolivia	1st	5000 m	17:42.95 A
2009	Bolivarian Games	Sucre, Bolivia	1st	10,000 m	36:00.62 A
2010	South American Cross Country Championships	Guayaquil, Ecuador	1st	8.0 km	27:15.9
2011	Pan American Games	Guadalajara, Mexico	3rd	5000 m	16:41.50
2012	Olympic Games	London, United Kingdom	25th	Marathon	2:28:54
2013	Bolivarian Games	Trujillo, Peru	1st	5000 m	15:30.63
2013	Bolivarian Games	Trujillo, Peru	1st	10,000 m	33:52.9 ht
2014	South American Games	Santiago, Chile	1st	5000 m	15:51.20
2014	South American Games	Santiago, Chile	1st	10,000 m	33:10.06
2014	Ibero-American Championships	São Paulo, Brazil	1st	5000 m	15:58.85
2015	Santiago Marathon	Santiago, Chile	1st	Marathon	2:28:18
2015	Quito Últimas Noticias	Quito, Ecuador	1st	15K	51:56
2015	South American Championships	Lima, Peru	1st	10,000 m	32:28.87
2015	Pichanaki International Marathon	Chanchamayo, Peru	1st	21K	1:28
2017	Bolivarian Games	Santa Marta, Colombia	1st	10,000 m	33:57.13
2018	South American Games	Cochabamba, Bolivia	1st	10,000 m	35:57.86
