= Miguel Ángel Almachi =

Ecuadorian long-distance runner (born 1985)

Miguel Almachi
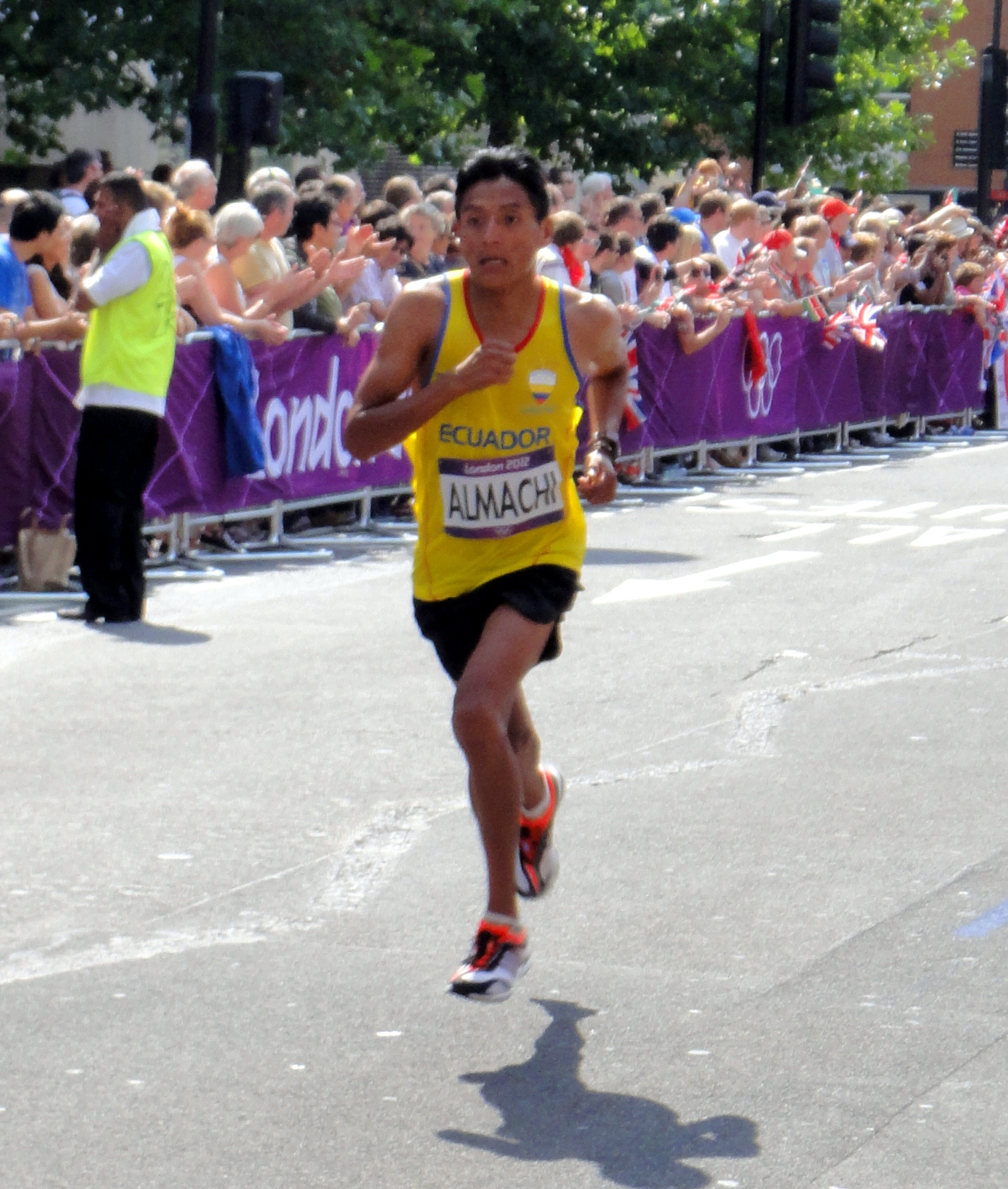
- Almachi in the marathon at the 2012 Summer Olympics in London

Personal information
- Full name: Miguel Ángel Almachi Cóndor
- Born: 2 May 1985 (age 41) Quito, Ecuador
- Height: 1.69 m (5 ft 6 1/2 in)
- Weight: 55 kg (121 lb)

Sport
- Country: Ecuador
- Sport: Athletics
- Event: Marathon
- Updated on 5 June 2014

Miguel Ángel Almachi Cóndor (born 2 May 1985) is an Ecuadorian long-distance runner. At the 2012 Summer Olympics, he competed in the Men's marathon, finishing in 50th place.

== Personal best ==
- 10000 m: 30:19.63 min A – Lima, Peru, 20 June 2009
- Half marathon: 1:06:25 – Trujillo, Peru, 30 November 2013
- Marathon: 2:15:08 – Santiago, Chile, 1 April 2012

== Achievements ==
Year	Competition	Venue	Position	Event	Notes
Representing Ecuador
2008	World Half Marathon Championships	Rio de Janeiro, Brazil	60th	Half marathon	1:10:34 hrs
2009	ALBA Games	Havana, Cuba	2nd	10,000 m	30:28.32 min
2009	South American Championships	Lima, Peru	6th	10,000 m	30:19.63 min A
2010	South American Cross Country Championships	Guayaquil, Ecuador	1st	12 km	35:52.9 min
2011	South American Cross Country Championships	Asunción, Paraguay	7th	12 km	38:22.8
2012	South American Cross Country Championships	Lima, Peru	6th	12 km	39:45.1
2012	Olympic Games	London, United Kingdom	50th	Marathon	2:19:53 hrs
2013	World Championships	Moscow, Russia	30th	Marathon	2:19:48
2013	Bolivarian Games	Trujillo, Peru	3rd	Half marathon	1:06:25
2014	South American Games	Santiago, Chile	—	10,000 m	DNF
