= Ángela Figueroa =

Colombian athlete (born 1984)

Personal information
- Full name: Ángela María Figueroa Palacios
- Born: June 28, 1984 (age 42) Bogotá, Colombia
- Height: 1.63 m (5 ft 4 in)
- Weight: 51 kg (112 lb)

Sport
- Country: Colombia
- Sport: Athletics
- Event: Long-distance running
Medal record
Representing Colombia
Pan American Games
Silver medal – second place	2011 Guadalajara	3000m steeplechase
Central American and Caribbean Games
Gold medal – first place	2014 Xalapa	3000m steeplechase
Silver medal – second place	2010 Mayaguez	3000m steeplechase
South American Games
Gold medal – first place	2006 Buenos Aires	3000m steeplechase
Silver medal – second place	2014 Santiago	3000m steeplechase
- Updated on 1 January 2015

Ángela María Figueroa Palacios (born 28 June 1984 in Bogotá), known as Ángela Figueroa is a Colombian athlete who specialises in the 3000 metres steeplechase. She competed at the 2012 Summer Olympics, placing 43rd overall.

== Personal bests ==
- 3000 m: 9:43.02– Cáceres, Spain, 30 June 2010
- 5000 m: 16:08.43 – Walnut, California, United States 19 April 2013
- 10,000 m: 34:22.45 – Buenos Aires, Argentina 5 June 2011
- 3000 m steeplechase: 9:42.71– Rio de Janeiro, Brazil 20 May 2012

== Competition record ==
Year	Competition	Venue	Position	Event	Notes
Representing Colombia
2003	South American Junior Championships	Guayaquil, Ecuador	7th	1500 m	4:40.1
2003	South American Junior Championships	Guayaquil, Ecuador	2nd	3000 m s'chase	10:46.24
2003	Pan American Junior Championships	Bridgetown, Barbados	3rd	3000 m	10:06.95
2003	Pan American Junior Championships	Bridgetown, Barbados	3rd	2000 m s'chase	6:51.31
2004	South American U23 Championships	Barquisimeto, Venezuela	5th	1500m	4:44.36
2004	South American U23 Championships	Barquisimeto, Venezuela	3rd	3000m steeplechase	10:39.12
2005	South American Championships	Cali, Colombia	5th	1500 m	4:38.65
2005	South American Championships	Cali, Colombia	4th	3000 m s'chase	10:52.06
2005	Bolivarian Games	Armenia, Colombia	3rd	1500 m	4:38.42
2005	Bolivarian Games	Armenia, Colombia	2nd	3000 m steeplechase	10:41.93
2006	South American U23 Championships / South American Games	Buenos Aires, Argentina	1st	3000 m s'chase	10:29.35
2007	South American Championships	São Paulo, Brazil	2nd	3000 m s'chase	10:13.88
2007	Pan American Games	Rio de Janeiro, Brazil	6th	3000 m steeplechase	10:14.92
2008	Ibero-American Championships	Iquique	3rd	3000 m s'chase	10:02.13
2008	Central American and Caribbean Championships	Cali, Colombia	1st	3000 m s'chase	10:18.23
2009	South American Championships	Lima, Peru	–	5000 m	DNF
2009	South American Championships	Lima, Peru	2nd	3000 m s'chase	9:54.83
2009	Central American and Caribbean Championships	Havana, Cuba	1st	3000 m s'chase	10:03.44
2009	Bolivarian Games	Sucre, Bolivia	1st	3000 m steeplechase	11:06.48
2010	South American Cross Country Championships	Guayaquil, Ecuador	2nd	8 km	27:17.2
2010	Ibero-American Championships	San Fernando, Spain	5th	3000 m s'chase	10:11.77
2010	Central American and Caribbean Games	Mayagüez, Puerto Rico	2nd	3000 m s'chase	10:18.28
2011	South American Cross Country Championships	Asunción, Paraguay	5th	8 km	28:03.5
2011	South American Championships	Buenos Aires, Argentina	6th	10,000 m	34:22.45
2011	South American Championships	Buenos Aires, Argentina	1st	3000 m s'chase	9:57.13
2011	World Championships	Daegu, South Korea	27th (h)	3000 m s'chase	10:06.00
2011	Pan American Games	Guadalajara, Mexico	2nd	3000 m s'chase	10:10.14
2012	Ibero-American Championships	Barquisimeto, Venezuela	6th	5000 m	16:42.94
2012	Olympic Games	London, United Kingdom	43rd (h)	3000 m s'chase	10:25.60
2013	Bolivarian Games	Trujillo, Peru	2nd	3000 m steeplechase	10:01.93
2014	South American Games	Santiago, Chile	4th	5000 m	16:22.28
2014	South American Games	Santiago, Chile	2nd	3000 m s'chase	10:07.02
2014	Ibero-American Championships	São Paulo, Brazil	8th	3000 m s'chase	10:29.83
2014	Central American and Caribbean Games	Xalapa, Mexico	5th	5000m	16:38.47 A
2014	Central American and Caribbean Games	Xalapa, Mexico	1st	3000m steeplechase	10:05.25 A
2015	South American Championships	Lima, Peru	4th	3000 m s'chase	10:01.3
2017	South American Championships	Asunción, Paraguay	3rd	5000 m	16:30.59
2017	South American Championships	Asunción, Paraguay	4th	10,000 m	35:10.29
2017	Bolivarian Games	Santa Marta, Colombia	5th	10,000 m	34:56.07
