= Constantino León =

Peruvian marathon runner

Personal information
- Full name: Constantino León López
- Nationality: Peru
- Born: 12 April 1974 (age 52) Pampas, Huancavelica, Peru

Sport
- Sport: Athletics
- Event: Distance running

Achievements and titles
- Personal bests: Half-marathon: 1:03:53 (2010); Marathon: 2:17:03 (2010)
- Updated on 14 June 2014

Constantino León López (born 12 April 1974) is a Peruvian marathon runner. He set a personal best time of 2:17:03, by finishing eleventh at the 2010 Chosunilbo Chunchon International Marathon in Chuncheon, South Korea.

Leon represented Peru at the 2008 Summer Olympics in Beijing, where he competed for the men's marathon. He successfully finished the race in sixty-first place by ten seconds ahead of Montenegro's Goran Stojiljković, with a time of 2:28:04.

== Personal bests ==
- 10,000 m: 30:34.6 min – Lima, Peru, 4 June 1999
- Half marathon: 1:03:53 min – Lima, Peru, 29 August 2010
- Marathon: 2:17:03 hrs – Chunchon, South Korea, 24 October 2010

== Achievements ==
Year	Competition	Venue	Position	Event	Notes
Representing the Peru
2002	World Half Marathon Championships	Brussels, Belgium	66th	Half marathon	1:05:36
2008	Olympic Games	Beijing, China	61st	Marathon	2:28:04
2009	South American Cross Country Championships	Concepción, Chile	8th	12 km	38:05
2009	South American Half Marathon Championships	Asunción, Paraguay	2nd	Half marathon	1:04:46
2009	World Championships	Berlin, Germany	51st	Marathon	2:23:34
2009	World Half Marathon Championships	Birmingham, United Kingdom	69th	Half marathon	1:06:95
2010	South American Cross Country Championships	Guayaquil, Ecuador	9th	12 km	36:40.2
2010	South American Half Marathon Championships	Lima, Peru	3rd	Half marathon	1:03:53
2010	World Half Marathon Championships	Nanning, China	37th	Half marathon	1:05:29
2011	Pan American Games	Guadalajara, Mexico	7th	Marathon	2:21:18
2012	World Half Marathon Championships	Kavarna, Bulgaria	45th	Half marathon	1:06:58
