= Willy Canchanya =

Peruvian runner (born 1991)

Personal information
- Born: 28 June 1991 (age 35)

Sport
- Country: Peru
- Sport: Long-distance running
Medal record
Men's athletics
Representing Peru
South American Games
Silver medal – second place	2018 Cochabamba	1500 m

Willy Canchanya (born 28 June 1991) is a Peruvian middle-distance and long-distance runner. In 2018, he competed in the men's half marathon at the 2018 IAAF World Half Marathon Championships held in Valencia, Spain. He finished in 27th place.

In 2018, he won the silver medal in the men's 1500 metres event at the 2018 South American Games held in Cochabamba, Bolivia. In the same year, he also competed in the 2018 Berlin Marathon held in Berlin, Germany.

In 2019, he competed in the men's marathon event at the 2019 Pan American Games held in Lima, Peru. He finished in 6th place with a time of 2:13:22.
