= Rizoneide Vanderlei =

Brazilian long-distance runner

Rizoneide Vanderlei, surname also referenced as Wanderlei or Wanderley, (born December 16, 1966) is a former Brazilian long-distance runner. Vanderlei competed in the 1997 IAAF World Cross Country Championships, 1995 IAAF World Half Marathon Championships, and the 1995 IAAF World Half Marathon Championships.

Vanderlei won the 1996 California International Marathon (2:35:46), and the 2000 Rio de Janeiro Marathon (2:43:53).

== Achievements ==
Year	Competition	Venue	Position	Notes
Representing Brazil
1996	California International Marathon	California State Capitol, United States	1st	Marathon
