= Raúl Machacuay =

Peruvian long-distance runner

Personal information
- Born: 18 February 1983 (age 43) Huancayo, Peru

Sport
- Sport: Track and field
- Event: Marathon

Raúl Machacuay (born 18 February 1983) is a Peruvian long-distance runner who specialises in the marathon. He competed in the men's marathon event at the 2016 Summer Olympics held in Rio de Janeiro, Brazil. In 2017, he competed in the men's marathon event at the 2017 World Championships in Athletics held in London, England.
