= Natalia Romero (Chilean athlete) =

Chilean long-distance runner

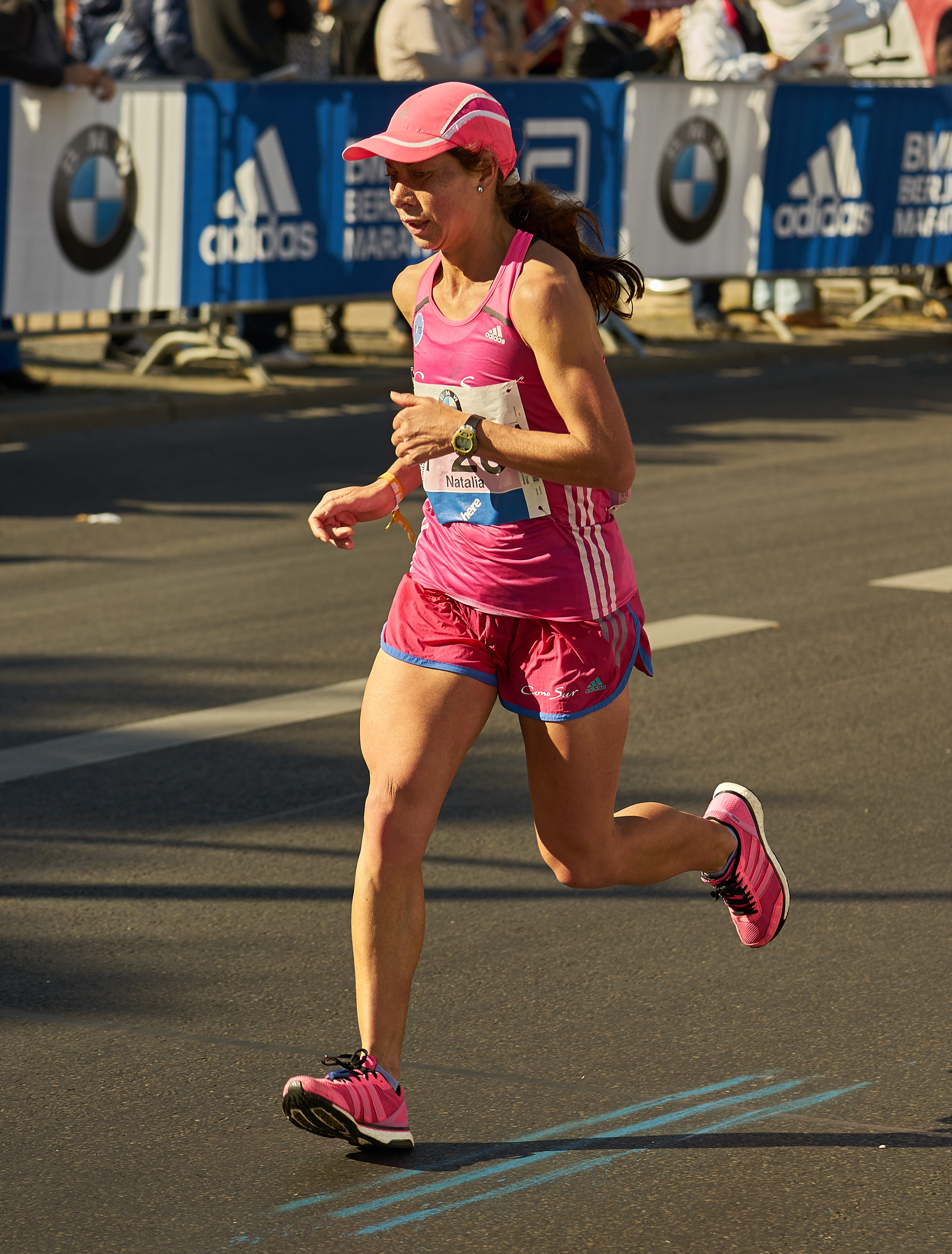
- Natalia Romero at Berlin-Marathon 2015

Personal information
- Born: February 26, 1980 (age 46)
- Height: 1.62 m (5 ft 4 in)
- Weight: 55 kg (121 lb)

Sport
- Country: Chile
- Sport: Athletics
- Event: Marathon

Natalia Romero (born 26 February 1980 in Talagante) is a Chilean long-distance runner. She competed in the marathon at the 2012 Summer Olympics, placing 69th with a time of 2:37:47.
