= Hyvon Ngetich =

Kenyan marathon runner

Hyvon Ngetich (born May 12, 1985) is an elite Kenyan marathon runner.

== Career highlights ==
In 2007, Ngetich completed the Chihuahua Half Marathon and placed second. In 2008, she won the Puerto de Veracruz Medio Marathon and placed third in the Austin Half Marathon and at the Ottawa Race Weekend 10K race.

2010 was a successful year for Ngetich, as she won the Zapopan Half Marathon, the Ciudad-Juarez Marathon, the Monterrey Half Marathon, and at the Grand Marathon Pacifico.

In 2011, she won the Santiago Marathon and took second place at the Ciudad-Juarez Marathon and the Dallas White Rock Marathon.

On February 15, 2015, Ngetich competed in the Austin Marathon. She was in the lead until she collapsed approximately fifty meters from the finish line. Despite medical personnel rushing toward her with a wheelchair, Ngetich refused the chair and crawled the last fifty meters on her hands and knees to cross the finish line in third place. Race Director John Conley adjusted Ngetich's purse prize to reflect second place.

== Personal bests ==
- 10K: 32:48 on May 24, 2008, in Ottawa, Canada
- Half Marathon: 1:11:00 on November 28, 2010, in Monterrey, Mexico
- Marathon: 2:34:42 on April 3, 2011, in Santiago, Chile
