= Érika Olivera =

Chilean long-distance runner

The Honourable Érika Olivera
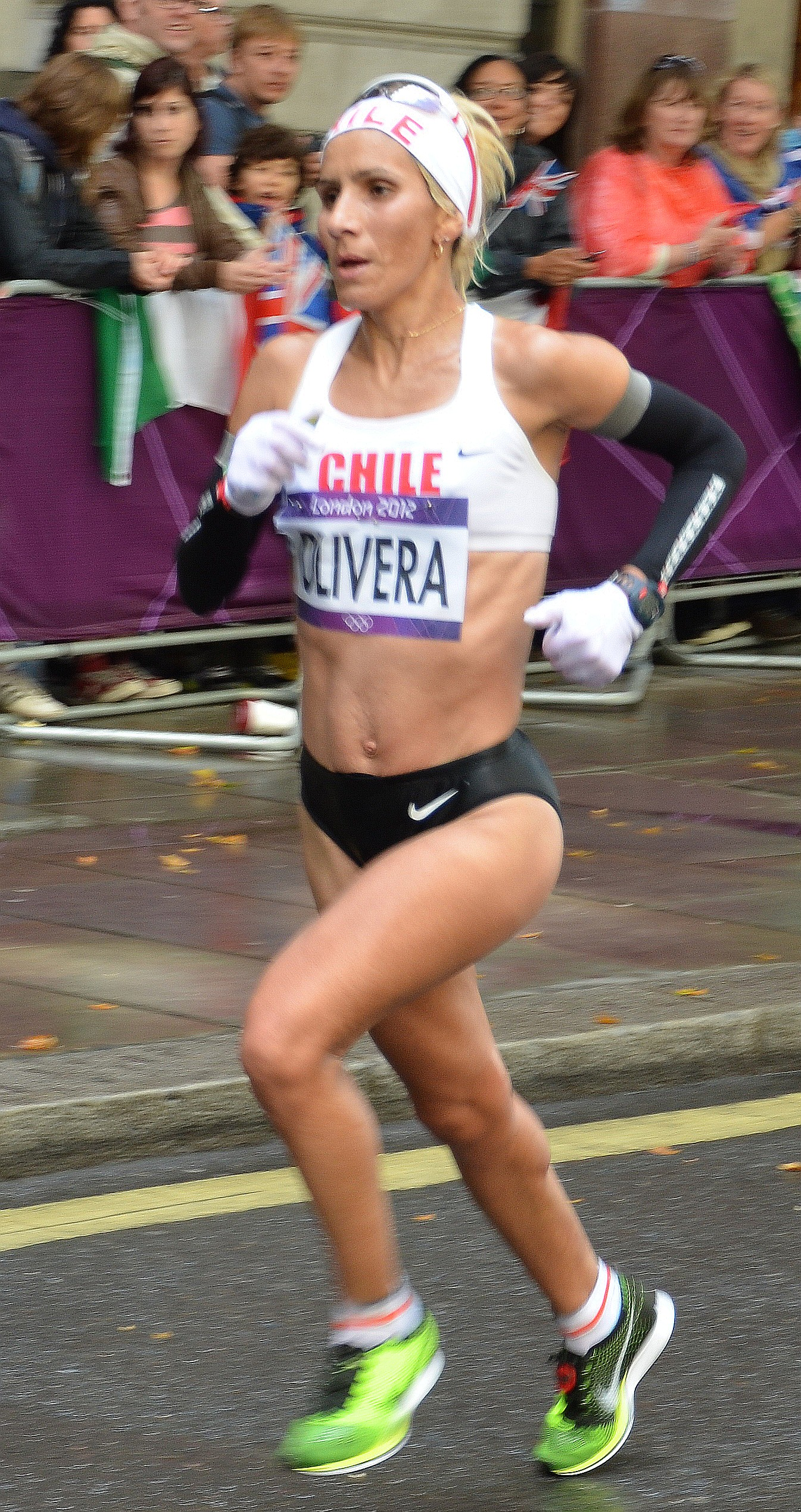
- Olivera in the 2012 Summer Olympics marathon

Personal information
- Full name: Érika Alejandra Olivera de la Fuente
- Born: 4 January 1976 (age 50) Quinta Normal, Chile
- Height: 1.65 m (5 ft 5 in)
- Weight: 55 kg (121 lb)

Sport
- Country: Chile
- Sport: Athletics
- Event: Marathon
Medal record
Pan American Games
Gold medal – first place	1999 Winnipeg	Marathon
Bronze medal – third place	2003 Santo Domingo	Marathon
South American Games
Gold medal – first place	1994 Valencia	3000 m
Gold medal – first place	1994 Valencia	10000 m
- Updated on 13 May 2014

Érika Alejandra Olivera de la Fuente (born 4 January 1976) is a Chilean marathon runner and deputy for the Democrats party.

She has competed at five Olympic Games, the most Olympic appearances ever by a female marathon runner.

== Career ==
She took the gold medal at the 1999 Pan American Games, setting a Pan American Games record at 2:37.41 hours. She won a bronze at the following edition in 2003. Starting in 1996, she represented her native country in three consecutive Summer Olympics, and also the 2012 Summer Olympics.

Olivera made her breakthrough at the junior level in 1994 when she won the 10,000 metres gold and 3000 metres bronze medals at the South American Junior Championships in Athletics. The following year she upgraded to a gold and a silver medal at the Pan American Junior Championships, before going on to complete a hat-trick of medals at the South American Junior Championships – she secured a 10,000 m and 3000 m double and also won the 1500 metres silver behind Bertha Sánchez.

Olivera is a two-time winner of the South American Cross Country Championships, having beaten all comers in both the long and short races in 1999. She is a five-time winner and course record holder of the Santiago Marathon. She won the 1995 edition of the Buenos Aires Marathon in Argentina and placed fourth at the 74th Saint Silvester Marathon in 1998.

She enjoyed success on the track at continental level, completing a 10,000 metres/5000 metres silver medal double at both the 1997 and 2003 South American Championships in Athletics. Further to this, she won a silver and a bronze at the 1999 edition of the competition. At the Ibero-American Championships, she has won medals in a number of events, beginning with a 5000 m gold medal and 10,000 m bronze in 1996, the 10,000 m gold at the 2000 edition, and finally a silver medal in the 3000 metres steeplechase in 2002.

Her personal best for the marathon is 2:32:23, set at the 1999 Rotterdam Marathon, which is also the Chilean record for the event. She is also the national record holder over the half marathon, 10,000 m and 5000 m.

After completing the marathon at the 2016 Summer Olympics, Olivera became the first female athlete ever in completing five olympic marathons. Immediately after the race, she announced her retirement from competitive athletics. In November 2016, Olivera announced that her last race as a professional will be at the 2017 Santiago Marathon, on which she completed the half-marathon in 1:38:17.

== Personal life ==
Erika Olivera was married with Ricardo Opazo, who was also her coach. Currently his partner is Chilean marathoner Leslie Encina. She has five children.

The athlete has always been critical with regard to sports financing in Chile, indicating the lack of financial support that she has had to overcome during her athletic career.

In 2015 Olivera manifested her intention of starting a political career once she finishes her athletic profession, considering that she will attempt to become a member of the Chilean Congress Cámara de Diputados de Chile, and showing interest in the Renovación Nacional (RN) party.

In 2016 Olivera revealed that her stepfather had sexually abused her during twelve years of her childhood.

In the 2017 Chilean general election, Oliveira was elected as a deputy for the RN with 30,784 votes, representing District 9 which includes Quinta Normal, Cerro Navia, Renca, Lo Prado, Recoleta, Independencia, Huechuraba, and Conchalí. She gained controversy after she compared the campaign of former presidential candidate Alejandro Guillier to the government of Venezuelan president Nicolás Maduro.

== Olympic results ==
Olympic Games	Discipline	Place	Time
(United States) 1996 Atlanta	Marathon	37	2:39:06
(Australia) 2000 Sydney	Marathon	27	2:35:07
(Greece) 2004 Athens	Marathon	58	2:57:14
(United Kingdom) 2012 London	Marathon	64	2:36:41
(Brazil) 2016 Rio de Janeiro	Marathon	105	2:50:29

Note: Olivera missed the 2008 Summer Olympics due to pregnancy.

== Personal bests ==
- 1500 m: 4:25.61 – Talca, Chile, 11 April 1997
- 3000 m: 9:21.73 – Santiago, Chile, 1 May 1999
- 5000 m: 15:51.45 – Rio de Janeiro, Brazil, 20 May 2000
- 10,000 m: 33:23.12 – Concepción, Chile, 30 November 1996
- Half marathon: 1:11:54 – Santiago, Chile, 10 September 2000
- Marathon: 2:32:23 – Rotterdam, Netherlands, 18 April 1999
- 3000 m steeplechase: 10:48.75– Guatemala City, Guatemala, 11 May 2002

== International competitions ==
Year	Competition	Venue	Position	Event	Notes
Representing Chile
1992	South American Junior Championships	Lima, Peru	6th	3000 m	10:32.7
1992	South American Junior Championships	Lima, Peru	5th	10,000 m	39:50.2
1992	South American Youth Championships	Santiago, Chile	9th	1500 m	4:56.23
1992	South American Youth Championships	Santiago, Chile	5th	3000 m	10:20.73
1993	South American Junior Championships	Puerto La Cruz, Venezuela	5th	3000 m	10:13.7
1994	South American Junior Championships	Santa Fe, Argentina	3rd	3000 m	9:48.03
1994	South American Junior Championships	Santa Fe, Argentina	1st	10,000 m	34:14.4
1994	World Junior Championships	Lisbon, Portugal	7th	10,000 m	34:36.96
1994	South American Games	Valencia, Venezuela	1st	3000 m	9:31.06
1994	South American Games	Valencia, Venezuela	1st	10,000 m	34:40.9
1995	Pan American Games	Mar del Plata, Argentina	7th	5000 m	16:13.76
1995	Pan American Games	Mar del Plata, Argentina	8th	10,000 m	34.54.42
1995	Pan American Junior Championships	Santiago, Chile	2nd	3000 m	9:32.52
1995	Pan American Junior Championships	Santiago, Chile	1st	10,000 m	34:43.10
1995	South American Junior Championships	Santiago, Chile	2nd	1500 m	10:05.42
1995	South American Junior Championships	Santiago, Chile	1st	3000 m	9:30.73
1995	South American Junior Championships	Santiago, Chile	1st	10,000 m	35:27.33
1995	Buenos Aires Marathon	Buenos Aires, Argentina	1st	Marathon	2:45:02
1996	South American Cross Country Championships	Asunción, Paraguay	2nd	6 km	21:51
1996	Ibero-American Championships	Medellín, Colombia	1st	5000 m	16:26.13
1996	Ibero-American Championships	Medellín, Colombia	3rd	10,000 m	34:41.75
1996	Olympic Games	Atlanta, United States	37th	Marathon	2:39:06
1997	South American Cross Country Championships	Comodoro Rivadavia, Argentina	2nd	6 km	21:31
1997	South American Championships	Mar del Plata, Argentina	2nd	5000 m	15:52.27
1997	South American Championships	Mar del Plata, Argentina	2nd	10,000 m	33:56.98
1998	South American Games	Cuenca, Ecuador	2nd	10,000 m	36:00.0
1998	Saint Silvester Road Race	São Paulo, Brazil	4th	15 km	53:33
1999	South American Cross Country Championships - Junior	Artur Nogueira, Brazil	1st	4 km	14:05
1999	South American Cross Country Championships - Junior	Artur Nogueira, Brazil	1st	8 km	29:48
1999	South American Championships	Bogotá, Colombia	5th	1500 m	4:49.25
1999	South American Championships	Bogotá, Colombia	3rd	5000 m	17:15.17
1999	South American Championships	Bogotá, Colombia	2nd	10,000 m	34:45.70
1999	Pan American Games	Winnipeg, Canada	1st	Marathon	2:37:41
2000	South American Cross Country Championships	Cartagena, Colombia	3rd	4 km	13:24
2000	South American Cross Country Championships	Cartagena, Colombia	3rd	8 km	28:12
2000	Ibero-American Championships	Rio de Janeiro, Brazil	5th	5000 m	15:51.45
2000	Ibero-American Championships	Rio de Janeiro, Brazil	1st	10,000 m	33:39.16
2000	Olympic Games	Sydney, Australia	27th	Marathon	2:35:07
2002	Ibero-American Championships	Guatemala, Guatemala	—	3000 m	DNF
2002	Ibero-American Championships	Guatemala, Guatemala	—	5000 m	DNF
2002	Ibero-American Championships	Guatemala, Guatemala	2nd	3000 m steeplechase	10:48.5
2002	South American Half Marathon Championships	Buenos Aires, Argentina	1st	Half marathon	1:14:51
2003	South American Cross Country Championships	Asunción, Paraguay	4th	4 km	14:56
2003	South American Cross Country Championships	Asunción, Paraguay	3rd	8 km	31:32
2003	South American Championships	Barquisimeto, Venezuela	2nd	5000 m	16:23.97
2003	South American Championships	Barquisimeto, Venezuela	2nd	10,000 m	34:43.02
2003	Pan American Games	Santo Domingo, Dominican Republic	3rd	Marathon	2:44:52
2004	Ibero-American Championships	Huelva, Spain	11th	5000 m	17:22.95
2004	Olympic Games	Athens, Greece	58th	Marathon	2:57:14
2007	South American Cross Country Championships	Rio de Janeiro, Brazil	—	8 km	DNF
2007	Pan American Games	Rio de Janeiro, Brazil	—	Marathon	DNF
2009	South American Cross Country Championships	Concepción, Chile	8th	8 km	29:17
2009	South American Championships	Lima, Peru	—	5000 m	DNF
2011	Pan American Games	Guadalajara, Mexico	5th	Marathon	2:44:06
2012	Olympic Games	London, United Kingdom	64th	Marathon	2:36:41
2013	World Championships	Moscow, Russia	—	Marathon	DNF
2014	South American Games	Santiago, Chile	6th	5000 m	16:37.84
2014	South American Games	Santiago, Chile	7th	10,000 m	34:21.93
2014	South American Marathon Championships	Santiago, Chile	1st	Marathon	2:36:08
2015	South American Championships	Lima, Peru	10th	10,000 m	36:14.96
2015	Pan American Games	Toronto, Canada	11th	Marathon	2:52:27
2016	Olympic Games	Rio de Janeiro, Brazil	105th	Marathon	2:50:29
2017	Santiago Marathon	Santiago, Chile	unknown	Half marathon	1:38:17

Olympic Games
Preceded by Dominique Ohaco	Flagbearer for Chile; Rio de Janeiro 2016	Succeeded by Henrik von Appen
