= Tatiele de Carvalho =

Brazilian long-distance runner

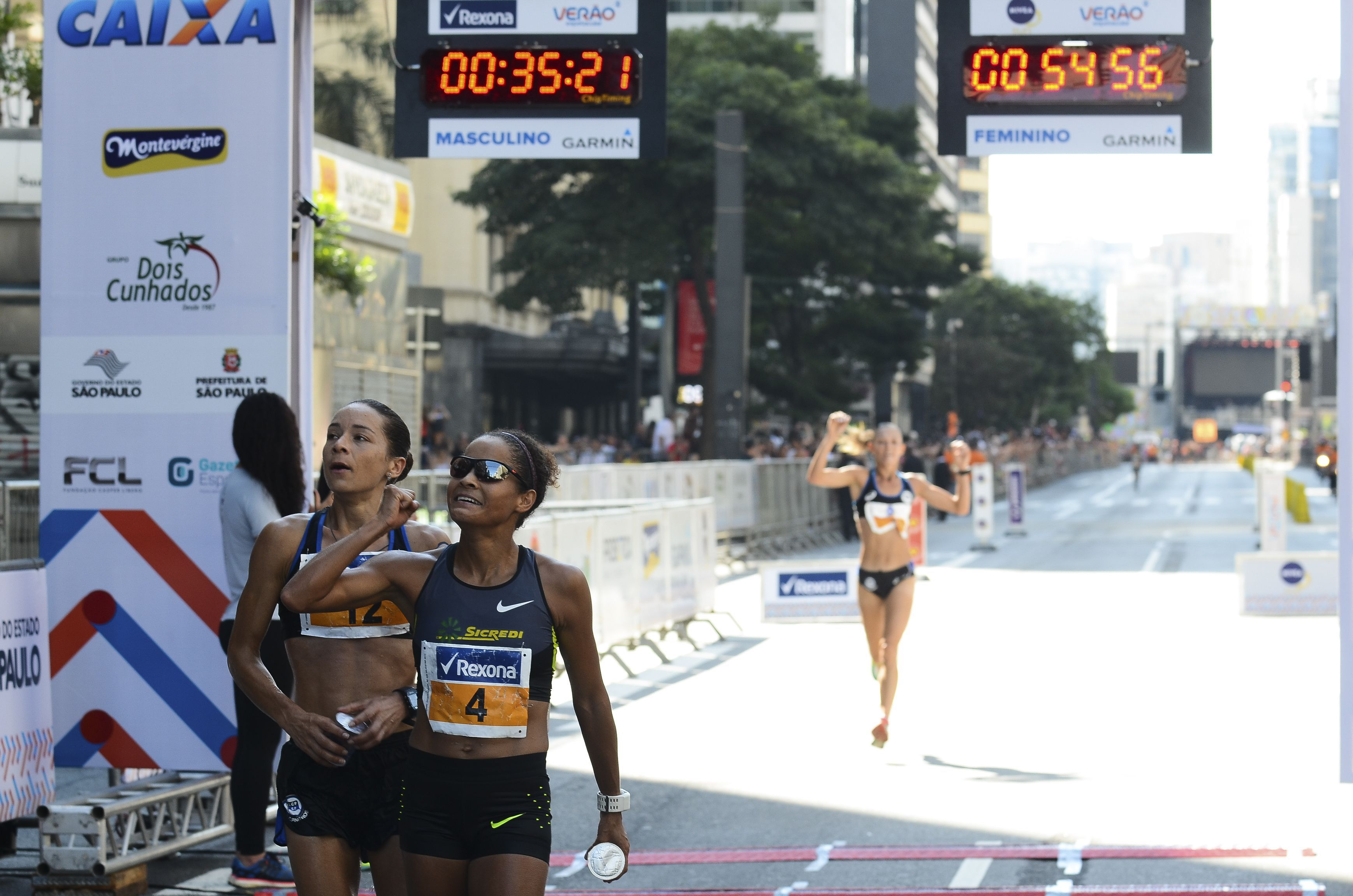
- Tatiele de Carvalho with sunglasses in 2016

Personal information
- Born: 22 November 1989 (age 36) Poços de Caldas, Brazil
- Height: 1.56 m (5 ft 1 in)
- Weight: 50 kg (110 lb)

Sport
- Sport: Athletics

Tatiele Roberta de Carvalho (born 22 November 1989) is a Brazilian long-distance runner. She competed at the 2016 Summer Olympics in Rio de Janeiro, in the women's 10,000 metres.
