= Abel Villanueva =

Peruvian long-distance runner

Personal information
- Born: 1981 (age 44–45)

Sport
- Country: Peru
- Sport: Track and field
- Event: Marathon

Abel Villanueva (born 1981) is a Peruvian long-distance runner who specialises in the marathon. He competed in the marathon event at the 2015 World Championships in Athletics in Beijing, China.
