= Daniel Chaves da Silva =

Brazilian long distance runner (born 1988)

Personal information
- Full name: Daniel Chaves da Silva
- Born: 10 July 1988 (age 37) Petrópolis, Brazil

Sport
- Sport: Athletics
- Events: 10000 metres; Half marathon; Marathon

Daniel Chaves da Silva (born 10 July 1988) is a Brazilian long-distance runner.

In 2013, he took part in the Bydgoszcz IAAF World Cross Country Championships at Myslecinek Park, Bydgoszcz.

He was selected to represent Brazil at the delayed 2020 Tokyo Olympic Games after he achieved the Olympic qualifying time on April 28, 2019 finishing 15th in the London Marathon with 2:11:10.

== Personal bests ==
Outdoor

- 3000 metres – 8:07.35 (Wageningen 2012)
- 5000 metres – 13:46.56 (Oordegem 2010)
- 10000 metres – 28:19.3h (Rio de Janeiro 2015)

Road

- 10K – 28:46 (Cipolletti 2017)
- Half marathon – 1:03:19 (Rio de Janeiro 2013)
- Marathon – 2:11:10 (London 2019)
