= Zenaide Vieira =

Brazilian steeplechase runner

Personal information
- Nationality: Brazil
- Born: 25 June 1985 (age 41) Jundiaí, São Paulo, Brazil
- Height: 1.75 m (5 ft 9 in)
- Weight: 55 kg (121 lb)

Sport
- Sport: Athletics
- Event: Steeplechase
- Club: Associação Profissional BM&F
- Coached by: Clodoaldo Lopes do Carmo

Achievements and titles
- Personal bests: 2000 m steeplechase: 6:39.23 (2008); 3000 m steeplechase: 9:42.10 (2008)
Medal record
Women's athletics
Representing Brazil
Pan American Games
Bronze medal – third place	2007 Rio de Janeiro	3000 m steeplechase
Ibero-American Championships
Gold medal – first place	2006 Ponce	3000 m steeplechase

Zenaide Vieira (born June 25, 1985 in Jundiaí, São Paulo) is a Brazilian steeplechase runner. She won the bronze medal for the 3000 metres steeplechase at the 2007 Pan American Games in Rio de Janeiro, with a time of 9:55.71.

Vieira represented Brazil at the 2008 Summer Olympics in Beijing, where she competed for the women's 3000 metres steeplechase. She ran in the third and last heat against sixteen other athletes, including Spain's Marta Domínguez, who was considered a heavy favorite in this event. Unfortunately, she was unable to cross the finish line, and most importantly, to complete the entire race at the end of her heat.

Vieira is a full-time member of Associação Profissional BM&F in São Caetano do Sul, São Paulo, being coached and trained by Clodoaldo Lopes do Carmo.
