= 1994 South American Cross Country Championships =

- Organisers: CONSUDATLE
- Edition: 9th
- Date: January 12–13
- Host city: Manaus, Amazonas, Brazil
- Events: 6
- Distances: 12.1 km – Senior men 7.3 km – Junior men (U20); 3.7 km – Youth men (U17); 6.1 km – Senior women 3.7 km – Junior women (U20); 2.5 km – Youth women (U17)
- Participation: 81 + 1 guest athletes from 6 + 1 guest nations

The 1994 South American Cross Country Championships took place on January 12–13, 1994. The races were held Manaus, Brazil.

Complete results, results for junior and youth competitions, and medal winners were published.

== Medallists ==
Event	Gold		Silver		Bronze	
Individual
Senior men (12.1 km)	Silvio Guerra; Ecuador	38:39	Artur de Freitas Castro; Brazil	39:04	Ronaldo da Costa; Brazil	39:15
Junior (U20) men (7.3 km)	Marcelo Elario Blanco; Brazil	24:16	Márcio dos Santos; Brazil	24:24	Fabio Anderson Biscola; Brazil	24:43
Youth (U17) men (3.7 km)	Roney Acelino de Souza; Brazil	13:04	Alexandre Gonçalves da Silva; Brazil	13:11	Elizeu Bezerra de Souza; Brazil	14:08
Senior women (6.1 km)	Carmem de Oliveira; Brazil	21:57	Viviany Anderson de Oliveira; Brazil	22:04	Silvana Pereira; Brazil	22:10
Junior (U20) women (3.7 km)	Fabiana Cristine da Silva; Brazil	14:03	María Virginia Fuente; Argentina	14:17	Miriam Achote; Ecuador	14:22
Youth (U17) women (2.5 km)	Adriana Ramos Lopes; Brazil	10:03	Michelle Barreto Costa; Brazil	10:21	Natalia Bourquin; Argentina	10:25
Team
Senior men	Brazil	10	Argentina	26		
Junior (U20) men	Brazil	6	Argentina	15		
Youth (U17) men	Brazil	6				
Senior women	Brazil	6	Argentina	15		
Junior (U20) women	Ecuador	14	Brazil	14	Argentina	17
Youth (U17) women	Brazil	6				

== Race results ==
=== Senior men's race (12.1 km) ===
Individual race
Rank	Athlete	Country	Time
1st place, gold medalist(s)	Silvio Guerra	Ecuador	38:39
2nd place, silver medalist(s)	Artur de Freitas Castro	Brazil	39:04
3rd place, bronze medalist(s)	Ronaldo da Costa	Brazil	39:15
4	Delmir Alves dos Santos	Brazil	39:31
5	Luíz Antônio dos Santos	Brazil	39:40
6	Antonio Silio	Argentina	40:10
7	Oscar Amaya	Argentina	40:21
8	Leonardo Malgor	Argentina	40:26
9	Valdenor Pereira dos Santos	Brazil	40:51
10	Franklin Tenorio	Ecuador	41:07
11	Juan Pablo Juárez	Argentina	41:12
12	Doval Carneiro da Silva	Brazil	41:25
13	Antonio Ibañez	Argentina	42:11
14	Daniel Castro	Argentina	42:31
15	Marcelo Cascabelo	Argentina	42:40
—	Mike O'Reilly	United Kingdom	43:28
16	José Geraldo Monteiro	Brazil	43:31
17	Romero Oliveira	Brazil	43:46
18	Paulino Martins	Brazil	43:46
20	Julio Hernández	Colombia	45:17

Teams
Rank
Team
Points

Brazil

Artur de Freitas Castro	1
Ronaldo da Costa	2
Delmir Alves dos Santos	3
Luíz Antônio dos Santos	4
(Valdenor Pereira dos Santos)	(n/s)
(Doval Carneiro da Silva)	(n/s)
(José Geraldo Monteiro)	(n/s)

10

Argentina

Antonio Silio	5
Oscar Amaya	6
Leonardo Malgor	7
Juan Pablo Juárez	8
(Antonio Ibañez)	(n/s)
(Daniel Castro)	(n/s)
(Marcelo Cascabelo)	(n/s)

26

- Note: Athletes in parentheses did not score for the team result. (n/s: nonscorer)

=== Junior (U20) men's race (7.3 km) ===
Individual race
Rank	Athlete	Country	Time
1st place, gold medalist(s)	Marcelo Elario Blanco	Brazil	24:16
2nd place, silver medalist(s)	Márcio dos Santos	Brazil	24:24
3rd place, bronze medalist(s)	Fabio Anderson Biscola	Brazil	24:43
4	Iván Noms	Argentina	24:58
5	Robinson Alves	Brazil	25:20
6	Julián Peralta	Argentina	25:33
7	Darío Nuñez	Argentina	25:53
8	Gustavo Adolfo Silva de Paula	Brazil	26:30
9	Julio Lima Pinheiro	Brazil	27:47
10	Railton Ipiranga de Araújo	Brazil	27:57
11	Enoch Guimarães Monteiro	Brazil	28:04
12	Marcelo Zabala	Argentina	28:17
13	Vagener Castro Pontes	Brazil	28:56
14	Fabiano Costa Maia	Brazil	29:34
15	Flavir René de Batalha	Brazil	29:49
16	Leandro Oliveira da Silva	Brazil	30:28
17	Charles Andre Marialva	Brazil	32:48

Teams
Rank
Team
Points

Brazil

Marcelo Elario Blanco	1
Márcio dos Santos	2
Fabio Anderson Biscola	3
(Robinson Alves)	(n/s)
(Gustavo Adolfo Silva de Paula)	(n/s)
(Julio Lima Pinheiro)	(n/s)
(Enoch Guimarães Monteiro)	(n/s)

6

Argentina

Iván Noms	4
Julián Peralta	5
Darío Nuñez	6
(Marcelo Zabala)	(n/s)

15

- Note: Athletes in parentheses did not score for the team result. (n/s: nonscorer)

=== Youth (U17) men's race (3.7 km) ===
Individual race
Rank	Athlete	Country	Time
1st place, gold medalist(s)	Roney Acelino de Souza	Brazil	13:04
2nd place, silver medalist(s)	Alexandre Gonçalves da Silva	Brazil	13:11
3rd place, bronze medalist(s)	Elizeu Bezerra de Souza	Brazil	14:08
4	Armando Cordeiro Duarte	Brazil	14:30
5	Célio Antônio Costa	Brazil	16:08
6	Walter Oliveira de Alcântara	Brazil	16:33
7	Elno de Souza	Brazil	16:39
8	Paulo Cesar Rodrigues	Brazil	17:04
9	Paulo Henrique Freitas	Brazil	17:13
10	Márcio Franca Saravia	Brazil	18:51

Teams
Rank

Team
Brazil

Roney Acelino de Souza	1
Alexandre Gonçalves da Silva	2
Elizeu Bezerra de Souza	3

Points
6

- Note: Athletes in parentheses did not score for the team result. (n/s: nonscorer)

=== Senior women's race (6.1 km) ===
Individual race
Rank	Athlete	Country	Time
1st place, gold medalist(s)	Carmem de Oliveira	Brazil	21:57
2nd place, silver medalist(s)	Viviany Anderson de Oliveira	Brazil	22:04
3rd place, bronze medalist(s)	Silvana Pereira	Brazil	22:10
4	Martha Tenorio	Ecuador	22:25
5	Roseli Aparecida Machado	Brazil	22:31
6	Iglandini González	Colombia	23:24
7	Elisa Cobañea	Argentina	23:31
8	Marilú Salazar	(Peru) Perú	23:48
9	María Inés Rodríguez	Argentina	24:11
10	Zulma Ortiz	Argentina	24:15
11	Iracema Mesquita dos Reis	Brazil	24:24
12	Vilma Pailós	Argentina	24:35
13	Irisdalva Tavares Almeida	Brazil	26:09
14	Raimunda Maria Brito da Fonseca	Brazil	27:41
15	Nemia Coca	Bolivia	28:22
16	Kelly Pinto Souza	Brazil	32:57

Teams
Rank
Team
Points

Brazil

Carmem de Oliveira	1
Viviany Anderson de Oliveira	2
Silvana Pereira	3
(Roseli Aparecida Machado)	(n/s)
(Iracema Mesquita dos Reis)	(n/s)
(Irisdalva Tavares Almeida)	(n/s)
(Raimunda Maria Brito da Fonseca)	(n/s)
(Kelly Pinto Souza)	(n/s)

6

Argentina

Elisa Cobañea	4
María Inés Rodríguez	5
Zulma Ortiz	6
(Vilma Pailós)	(n/s)

15

- Note: Athletes in parentheses did not score for the team result. (n/s: nonscorer)

=== Junior (U20) women's race (3.7 km) ===
Individual race
Rank	Athlete	Country	Time
1st place, gold medalist(s)	Fabiana Cristine da Silva	Brazil	14:03
2nd place, silver medalist(s)	María Virginia Fuente	Argentina	14:17
3rd place, bronze medalist(s)	Miriam Achote	Ecuador	14:22
4	Vivian Magalhães de Aguiar	Brazil	14:26
5	Carina Moncayo	Ecuador	14:31
6	María Elena Calle	Ecuador	14:35
7	Patricia Valenzuela	Argentina	14:49
8	Susana Trinak	Argentina	15:02
9	Fernanda Rodríguez	Argentina	15:03
10	Francislene da Silva	Brazil	15:17
11	Mariela Davico	Argentina	15:29
12	Adenisia Santos de Silva	Brazil	15:58
13	Norma Torres	Ecuador	16:09
14	Gracineide Maria de Souza	Brazil	16:17

Teams
Rank	Team	Points
1st place, gold medalist(s)	Ecuador: Miriam Achote / 3; Carina Moncayo / 5; María Elena Calle / 6; (Norma Torres) / (n/s)	14
2nd place, silver medalist(s)	Brazil: Fabiana Cristine da Silva / 1; Vivian Magalhães de Aguiar / 4; Francislene da Silva / 9; (Adenisia Santos de Silva) / (n/s); (Gracineide Maria de Souza) / (n/s)	14
3rd place, bronze medalist(s)	Argentina: María Virginia Fuente / 2; Patricia Valenzuela / 7; Susana Trinak / 8; (Fernanda Rodríguez) / (n/s); (Mariela Davico) / (n/s)	17

- Note: Athletes in parentheses did not score for the team result. (n/s: nonscorer)

=== Youth (U17) women's race (2.5 km) ===
Individual race
Rank	Athlete	Country	Time
1st place, gold medalist(s)	Adriana Ramos Lopes	Brazil	10:03
2nd place, silver medalist(s)	Michelle Barreto Costa	Brazil	10:21
3rd place, bronze medalist(s)	Natalia Bourquin	Argentina	10:25
4	Ana Maria Costa da Silva	Brazil	11:34
5	Maria Jurema Costa	Brazil	12:50

Teams
Rank

Team
Brazil

Adriana Ramos Lopes	1
Michelle Barreto Costa	2
Ana Maria Costa da Silva	3
(Maria Jurema Costa)	(n/s)

Points
6

- Note: Athletes in parentheses did not score for the team result. (n/s: nonscorer)

== Medal table (unofficial) ==
* Host nation (Brazil)

Rank	Nation	Gold	Silver	Bronze	Total
1	Brazil*	10	6	4	20
2	Ecuador	2	0	1	3
3	Argentina	0	4	2	6
Totals (3 entries)		12	10	7	29

- Note: Totals include both individual and team medals, with medals in the team competition counting as one medal.

== Participation ==
According to an unofficial count, 81 athletes (+ 1 guest athlete) from 6 countries (1 + guest country) participated.

- Argentina (21)
- Bolivia (1)
- Brazil (49)
- Colombia (2)
- Ecuador (7)
- (Peru) Perú (1)

Guest country:

- United Kingdom (1)

== See also ==
- 1994 in athletics (track and field)
