= 1995 South American Cross Country Championships =

Running race

- Organisers: CONSUDATLE
- Edition: 10th
- Date: February 25–26
- Host city: Cali, Valle del Cauca, Colombia
- Events: 6
- Distances: 12 km – Senior men 8 km – Junior men (U20); 4 km – Youth men (U17); 6 km – Senior women 4 km – Junior women (U20); 4 km – Youth women (U17)
- Participation: 60 athletes from 5 nations

The 1995 South American Cross Country Championships took place on February 25–26, 1995. The races were held in Cali, Colombia.

Complete results, results for junior and youth competitions, and medal winners were published.

== Medallists ==
Event	Gold		Silver		Bronze	
Individual
Senior men (12 km)	Vanderlei Cordeiro de Lima; Brazil	33:04	Herder Vásquez; Colombia	33:08	Emerson Iser Bem; Brazil	33:12
Junior (U20) men (8 km)	Clodoaldo Gomes da Silva; Brazil	23:28	Mauricio Ladino; Colombia	23:30	José Alirio Carrasco; Colombia	23:31
Youth (U17) men (4 km)	Claudinei Pereira Vitor; Brazil	12:04	Wilmer Avendaño; Colombia	12:12	Jeison Vargas; Colombia	12:14
Senior women (6 km)	Roseli Aparecida Machado; Brazil	19:28	Iglandini González; Colombia	20:03	Solange Cordeiro de Souza; Brazil	20:13
Junior (U20) women (4 km)	Bertha Sánchez; Colombia	13:40	Gabriela Cevallos; Ecuador	13:54	Fabiana Cristine da Silva; Brazil	14:00
Youth (U17) women (4 km)	Yulina Asis; Colombia	14:37	Sara Nivicela; Ecuador	14:41	Yolanda Fernández; Colombia	14:42
Team
Senior men	Brazil	13				
Junior (U20) men	Brazil	10	Colombia	15	Ecuador	22
Youth (U17) men	Colombia	9				
Senior women	Brazil	8	Colombia	16		
Junior (U20) women	Brazil	12	Colombia	22		
Youth (U17) women	Colombia	8				

== Race results ==
The result lists might be incomplete.

=== Senior men's race (12 km) ===
Individual race
Rank	Athlete	Country	Time
1st place, gold medalist(s)	Vanderlei Cordeiro de Lima	Brazil	33:04
2nd place, silver medalist(s)	Herder Vásquez	Colombia	33:08
3rd place, bronze medalist(s)	Emerson Iser Bem	Brazil	33:12
4	Benedito Donizetti Gomes	Brazil	33:19
5	Daniel Lopes Ferreira	Brazil	33:46
6	José Orlando Guerrero	Colombia	33:53
7	Silvio Guerra	Ecuador	34:16
8	Elenilson da Silva	Brazil	34:40
9	Roberto Punina	Ecuador	34:44
10	William Roldán	Colombia	34:50

Teams
Rank

Team
Brazil

Vanderlei Cordeiro de Lima	1
Emerson Iser Bem	3
Benedito Donizetti Gomes	4
(Daniel Lopes Ferreira)	5
(Elenilson da Silva)	(8)

Points
13

- Note: Athletes in parentheses did not score for the team result.

=== Junior (U20) men's race (8 km) ===
Individual race
Rank	Athlete	Country	Time
1st place, gold medalist(s)	Clodoaldo Gomes da Silva	Brazil	23:28
2nd place, silver medalist(s)	Mauricio Ladino	Colombia	23:30
3rd place, bronze medalist(s)	José Alirio Carrasco	Colombia	23:31
4	Paulo Vitor Lunkes	Brazil	23:398
5	Marilson Gomes dos Santos	Brazil	23:55
6	Omar Aguirre	Ecuador	24:06
7	Giovanny Romero	Ecuador	24:14
8	Márcio da Silva	Brazil	24:26
9	Charles Ludeza	Ecuador	24:47
10	Juvenal Vásquez	Colombia	25:05

Teams
Rank	Team	Points
1st place, gold medalist(s)	Brazil: Clodoaldo Gomes da Silva / 1; Paulo Vitor Lunkes / 4; Marilson Gomes dos Santos / 5; (Márcio da Silva) / (8)	10
2nd place, silver medalist(s)	Colombia: Mauricio Ladino / 2; José Alirio Carrasco / 3; Juvenal Vásquez / 10	15
3rd place, bronze medalist(s)	Ecuador: Omar Aguirre / 6; Giovanny Romero / 7; Charles Ludeza / 9	22

- Note: Athletes in parentheses did not score for the team result.

=== Youth (U17) men's race (4 km) ===
Individual race
Rank	Athlete	Country	Time
1st place, gold medalist(s)	Claudinei Pereira Vitor	Brazil	12:04
2nd place, silver medalist(s)	Wilmer Avendaño	Colombia	12:12
3rd place, bronze medalist(s)	Jeison Vargas	Colombia	12:14
4	Ricardo Caicedo	Colombia	12:22
5	Diego Toro	Colombia	12:51
6	Wilfredo Ríos	Colombia	12:54
7	Leonardo Cantor	Colombia	12:59
8	Juan Toral	Ecuador	13:00
9	Pedro González	Colombia	13:03
10	Jovanny Baltan	Colombia	13:17

Teams
Rank

Team
Colombia

Wilmer Avendaño	2
Jeison Vargas	3
Ricardo Caicedo	4
(Diego Toro)	(5)
(Wilfredo Ríos)	(6)
(Leonardo Cantor)	(7)
(Pedro González)	(9)
(Jovanny Baltan)	(10)

Points
9

- Note: Athletes in parentheses did not score for the team result.

=== Senior women's race (6 km) ===
Individual race
Rank	Athlete	Country	Time
1st place, gold medalist(s)	Roseli Aparecida Machado	Brazil	19:28
2nd place, silver medalist(s)	Iglandini González	Colombia	20:03
3rd place, bronze medalist(s)	Solange Cordeiro de Souza	Brazil	20:13
4	Maria Nascimento	Brazil	20:16
5	Esneda Londoño	Colombia	20:25
6	Martha Tenorio	Ecuador	20:43
7	María Calle	Ecuador	20:48
8	Cecilia Rojas	Colombia	20:49
9	Miriam Pulido	Colombia	21:06
10	María Inés Rodríguez	Argentina	21:08

Teams
Rank
Team
Points

Brazil

Roseli Aparecida Machado	1
Solange Cordeiro de Souza	3
Maria Nascimento	4

8

Colombia

Iglandini González	2
Esneda Londoño	5
Cecilia Rojas	8
(Miriam Pulido)	(9)

16

- Note: Athletes in parentheses did not score for the team result.

=== Junior (U20) women's race (4 km) ===
Individual race
Rank	Athlete	Country	Time
1st place, gold medalist(s)	Bertha Sánchez	Colombia	13:40
2nd place, silver medalist(s)	Gabriela Cevallos	Ecuador	13:54
3rd place, bronze medalist(s)	Fabiana Cristine da Silva	Brazil	14:00
4	Helena dos Santos	Brazil	14:05
5	Isabel Aparecida Boldo	Brazil	14:11
6	Margoth Bonilla	Colombia	14:20
7	Valquíria Silva Santos	Brazil	14:26
8	Julia Rivera	(Peru) Perú	14:29
9	Karina Moncayo	Ecuador	14:31
10	Erika Vivas	Colombia	14:38

Teams
Rank
Team
Points

Brazil

Fabiana Cristine da Silva	3
Helena dos Santos	4
Isabel Aparecida Boldo	5
(Valquíria Silva Santos)	(7)

12

Colombia

Bertha Sánchez	1
Margoth Bonilla	6
Erika Vivas	10

22

- Note: Athletes in parentheses did not score for the team result.

=== Youth (U17) women's race (4 km) ===
Individual race
Rank	Athlete	Country	Time
1st place, gold medalist(s)	Yulina Asis	Colombia	14:37
2nd place, silver medalist(s)	Sara Nivicela	Ecuador	14:41
3rd place, bronze medalist(s)	Yolanda Fernández	Colombia	14:42
4	Luz Rojas	Colombia	14:48
5	Luz González	Colombia	14:49
6	Melisa Murillo	Colombia	15:03
7	Claudia Tangarife	Colombia	15:08
8	Miriam da Silva	Brazil	15:12
9	Moncia Grande	Colombia	15:17
10	Ana Quintero	Colombia	15:41

Teams
Rank

Team
Colombia

Yulina Asis	1
Yolanda Fernández	3
Luz Rojas	4
(Luz González)	(5)
(Melisa Murillo)	(6)
(Claudia Tangarife)	(7)
(Moncia Grande)	(9)
(Ana Quintero)	(10)

Points
8

- Note: Athletes in parentheses did not score for the team result.

== Medal table (unofficial) ==
* Host nation (Colombia)

Rank	Nation	Gold	Silver	Bronze	Total
1	Brazil	8	0	3	11
2	Colombia*	4	7	3	14
3	Ecuador	0	2	1	3
Totals (3 entries)		12	9	7	28

- Note: Totals include both individual and team medals, with medals in the team competition counting as one medal.

== Participation ==
According to an unofficial count, 60 athletes from 5 countries participated.

- Argentina (1)
- Brazil (18)
- Colombia (29)
- Ecuador (11)
- (Peru) Perú (1)

== See also ==
- 1995 in athletics (track and field)
