= 1989 South American Cross Country Championships =

- Organisers: CONSUDATLE
- Edition: 4th
- Date: February 26
- Host city: Asunción, Paraguay
- Events: 4
- Distances: 10 km – Senior men 6 km – Junior men (U20); 6 km – Senior women 4 km – Junior women (U20)
- Participation: 32 athletes from 6 nations

The 1989 South American Cross Country Championships took place on February 26, 1989. The races were held in Asunción, Paraguay.

Complete results, results for junior and youth competitions, and medal winners were published.

== Medallists ==
Event	Gold		Silver		Bronze	
Individual
Senior men (10 km)	Artur de Freitas Castro; Brazil	31:17	João Alves de Souza; Brazil	31:17	Antonio Silio; Argentina	31:30
Junior (U20) men (6 km)	Robinson Semolini; Brazil	19:28	Luciano Cecílio Rosa; Brazil	19:51	Alexandre Marques dos Santos; Brazil	20:03
Senior women (6 km)	Griselda González; Argentina	21:47	Norma Fernández; Argentina	22:28	Beatriz Coronel; Argentina	22:35
Junior (U20) women (4 km)	Carmen Mabel Arrúa; Argentina	14:45	Graciela Lezcano; Argentina	14:55	Célia Regina Ferreira dos Santos; Brazil	15:16

== Race results ==
=== Senior men's race (12 km) ===
Individual race
Rank	Athlete	Country	Time
1st place, gold medalist(s)	Artur de Freitas Castro	Brazil	31:17
2nd place, silver medalist(s)	João Alves de Souza	Brazil	31:17
3rd place, bronze medalist(s)	Antonio Silio	Argentina	31:30
4	Marcelo Cascabelo	Argentina	31:54
5	Roberto Punina	Ecuador	32:21
6	Julio César Gómez	Argentina	32:40
7	Néstor Jami	Ecuador	32:49
8	Ramón López	Paraguay	33:08
9	Eladio Fernández	Paraguay	33:32
10	Ricardo Vera	Uruguay	34:04

=== Junior (U20) men's race (8 km) ===
Individual race
Rank	Athlete	Country	Time
1st place, gold medalist(s)	Robinson Semolini	Brazil	19:28
2nd place, silver medalist(s)	Luciano Cecílio Rosa	Brazil	19:51
3rd place, bronze medalist(s)	Alexandre Marques dos Santos	Brazil	20:03
4	Rubén Ríos	Argentina	20:09
5	Rubén Álvarez	Argentina	20:14
6	Osvaldo Ramírez	Paraguay	20:44
7	Fernando González	Argentina	20:47
8	Ciriaco Casco	Paraguay	22:07
9	Felipe Brítez	Paraguay	23:14

=== Senior women's race (8 km) ===
Individual race
Rank	Athlete	Country	Time
1st place, gold medalist(s)	Griselda González	Argentina	21:47
2nd place, silver medalist(s)	Norma Fernández	Argentina	22:28
3rd place, bronze medalist(s)	Beatriz Coronel	Argentina	22:35
4	Natividad Fernández	Paraguay	22:51
5	Marisol Cossio	Bolivia	23:30
6	Cecilia Ruiz Díaz	Paraguay	27:51

=== Junior (U20) women's race (6 km) ===
Individual race
Rank	Athlete	Country	Time
1st place, gold medalist(s)	Carmen Mabel Arrúa	Argentina	14:45
2nd place, silver medalist(s)	Graciela Lezcano	Argentina	14:55
3rd place, bronze medalist(s)	Célia Regina Ferreira dos Santos	Brazil	15:16
4	Analía Marchisio	Argentina	15:24
5	Carmen Espínola	Paraguay	15:47
6	Emilce Jiménez	Paraguay	17:23
7	Mónica Pereira	Paraguay	17:54

== Medal table (unofficial) ==
Rank	Nation	Gold	Silver	Bronze	Total
1	Argentina (ARG)	2	2	2	6
1	Brazil (BRA)	2	2	2	6
Totals (2 entries)		4	4	4	12

== Participation ==
According to an unofficial count, 32 athletes from 6 countries participated.

- Argentina (12)
- Bolivia (1)
- Brazil (6)
- Ecuador (2)
- Paraguay (10)
- Uruguay (1)

== See also ==
- 1989 in athletics (track and field)
