= 1993 South American Cross Country Championships =

Running race

- Organisers: CONSUDATLE
- Edition: 8th
- Date: February 20–21
- Host city: Cali, Valle del Cauca, Colombia
- Events: 6
- Distances: 12 km – Senior men 8 km – Junior men (U20); 4 km – Youth men (U17); 6 km – Senior women 4 km – Junior women (U20); 4 km – Youth women (U17)
- Participation: 89 athletes from 5 nations

The 1993 South American Cross Country Championships took place on February 20–21, 1993. The races were held in Cali, Colombia.

For the first time, medals were awarded for teams. A list of athletes announced to participate, results of the top 10 athletes, top 10 results for junior and youth competitions, and medal winners were published.

== Medallists ==
Event	Gold		Silver		Bronze	
Individual
Senior men (12 km)	Valdenor dos Santos; Brazil	36:33	Silvio Guerra; Ecuador	36:37	Vanderlei Cordeiro de Lima; Brazil	36:40
Junior (U20) men (8 km)	Elias Rodrigues Bastos; Brazil	25:43	Gustavo Adolfo Silva de Paula; Brazil	25:56	Robson Alves; Brazil	25:48
Youth (U17) men (4 km)	Mauricio Ladino; Colombia	13:27	Omar Aguirre; Ecuador	13:41	José Marín; Colombia	14:10
Senior women (6 km)	Silvana Pereira; Brazil	20:51	Martha Tenorio; Ecuador	21:02	Stella Castro; Colombia	21:03
Junior (U20) women (4 km)	Sandra Ruales; Ecuador	14:31	Fabiana Cristine da Silva; Brazil	14:48	Miriam Achote; Ecuador	14:50
Youth (U17) women (4 km)	Bertha Sánchez; Colombia	14:55	Carmen Luglia; Ecuador	15:28	Erika Abril; Colombia	15:44
Team
Senior men	Brazil	13	Ecuador	29	Argentina	47
Junior (U20) men	Brazil	6	Argentina	24	Ecuador	26
Youth (U17) men	Colombia	9	Ecuador	12		
Senior women	Brazil	14	Colombia	20	Ecuador	24
Junior (U20) women	Ecuador	11	Brazil	18	Colombia	39
Youth (U17) women	Colombia	10	Ecuador	14		

== Race results ==
=== Senior men's race (12 km) ===
Individual race
Rank	Athlete	Country	Time
1st place, gold medalist(s)	Valdenor dos Santos	Brazil	36:33
2nd place, silver medalist(s)	Silvio Guerra	Ecuador	36:37
3rd place, bronze medalist(s)	Vanderlei Cordeiro de Lima	Brazil	36:40
4	Adalberto Batista Garcia	Brazil	36:43
5	Ronaldo da Costa	Brazil	36:50
6	Roberto Punina	Ecuador	36:51
7	Leonardo Malgor	Argentina	36:54
8	Luíz Antônio dos Santos	Brazil	36:55
9	Néstor Quinapanta	Ecuador	37:14
10	Oscar Amaya	Argentina	37:34
	Jairo Correa	Colombia	??
	Orlando Guerrero	Colombia	??
	Humberto Antonio	Colombia	??
	Libardo Briceño	Colombia	??
	Carlos Gómez	Colombia	??
	José Riveros	Colombia	??
	Marcelo Cascabelo	Argentina	??
	Oscar Cortínez	Argentina	??
	Antonio Ibáñez	Argentina	??
	Néstor Jami	Ecuador	??
	Franklin Tenorio	Ecuador	??
	Iván Acosta	Peru	??

Teams
Rank	Team	Points
1st place, gold medalist(s)	Brazil: Valdenor dos Santos / 1; Vanderlei Cordeiro de Lima / 3; Adalberto Batista Garcia / 4; Ronaldo da Costa / 5	13
2nd place, silver medalist(s)	Ecuador: Silvio Guerra / 2; Roberto Punina / 6; Néstor Quinapanta / 9; Néstor Jami / ??; Franklin Tenorio / ??	29
3rd place, bronze medalist(s)	Argentina: Leonardo Malgor / 7; Oscar Amaya / 10; Marcelo Cascabelo / ??; Oscar Cortínez / ??; Antonio Ibáñez / ??	47
4	Colombia: Jairo Correa / ??; Orlando Guerrero / ??; Humberto Antonio / ??; Libardo Briceño / ??; Carlos Gómez / ??; José Riveros / ??	57

- Note: Athletes in parentheses did not score for the team result.

=== Junior (U20) men's race (8 km) ===
Individual race
Rank	Athlete	Country	Time
1st place, gold medalist(s)	Elias Rodrigues Bastos	Brazil	25:43
2nd place, silver medalist(s)	Gustavo Adolfo Silva de Paula	Brazil	25:56
3rd place, bronze medalist(s)	Robson Alves	Brazil	25:48
4	Márcio dos Santos	Brazil	25:52
5	Horacio Ferreira	Argentina	26:00
6	Mariano Tarilo	Argentina	26:40
7	Carlos Collahuazo	Ecuador	27:19
8	Washington Tenorio	Ecuador	27:33
9	Hugo Jiménez	Colombia	27:44
10	Edelberto Roa	Colombia	28:04
	Alexander Cuncanchun	Colombia	??
	Julián Peralta	Argentina	??
	Guido Bustillos	Ecuador	??
	José Pérez	Ecuador	??
	Richard Arias	Ecuador	??

Teams
Rank	Team	Points
1st place, gold medalist(s)	Brazil: Elias Rodrigues Bastos / 1; Gustavo Adolfo Silva de Paula / 2; Robson Alves / 3; (Márcio dos Santos) / (4)	6
2nd place, silver medalist(s)	Argentina: Horacio Fereryra / 5; Mariano Tarilo / 6; Julián Peralta / 13	24
3rd place, bronze medalist(s)	Ecuador: Carlos Collahuazo / 7; Washington Tenorio / 8; Guido Bustillos / ??; José Pérez / ??; Richard Arias / ??	26
4	Colombia: Hugo Jiménez / 9; Edelberto Roa / 10; Alexander Cuncanchun / 12	31

- Note: Athletes in parentheses did not score for the team result.

=== Youth (U17) men's race (4 km) ===
Individual race
Rank	Athlete	Country	Time
1st place, gold medalist(s)	Mauricio Ladino	Colombia	13:27
2nd place, silver medalist(s)	Omar Aguirre	Ecuador	13:41
3rd place, bronze medalist(s)	José Marín	Colombia	14:10
4	Freddy Ancholuisa	Ecuador	14:17
5	José Giménez	Colombia	14:21
6	Edwin Quinataga	Ecuador	16:14
7	Gonzalo Armas	Ecuador	19:16

Teams
Rank
Team
Points

Colombia

Mauricio Ladino	1
José Marín	3
José Giménez	5

9

Ecuador

Omar Aguirre	2
Freddy Ancholuisa	4
Edwin Quinataga	6
(Gonzalo Armas)	(7)

12

- Note: Athletes in parentheses did not score for the team result.

=== Senior women's race (6 km) ===
Individual race
Rank	Athlete	Country	Time
1st place, gold medalist(s)	Silvana Pereira	Brazil	20:51
2nd place, silver medalist(s)	Martha Tenorio	Ecuador	21:02
3rd place, bronze medalist(s)	Stella Castro	Colombia	21:03
4	Vilma Pailós	Argentina	21:33
5	Iglandini González	Colombia	21:40
6	Solange Cordeiro de Souza	Brazil	21:50
7	Rita de Cassia Santos de Jesús	Brazil	21:56
8	Roseli Aparecida Machado	Brazil	22:08
9	Teresa Paucar	Ecuador	22:19
10	María Inés Rodríguez	Argentina	22:27
	Martha Orellana	Argentina	??
	Maria Arias	Colombia	??
	Esneda Londoño	Colombia	??
	Alirio Carrasco	Colombia	??
	Fanny Vilcabamba	Ecuador	??
	Ximena Albán	Ecuador	??
	Yolanda Quimbita	Ecuador	??
	Vidalina Jaime	Peru	??

Teams
Rank	Team	Points
1st place, gold medalist(s)	Brazil: Silvana Pereira / 1; Solange Cordeiro de Souza / 6; Rita de Cassia Santos de Jesús / 7; (Roseli Aparecida Machado) / (8)	14
2nd place, silver medalist(s)	Colombia: Stella Castro / 3; Iglandini González / 5; Maria Arias / ??; Esneda Londoño / ??; Alirio Carrasco / ??	20
3rd place, bronze medalist(s)	Ecuador: Martha Tenorio / 2; Teresa Paucar / 9; Fanny Vilcabamba / ??; Ximena Albán / ??; Yolanda Quimbita / ??	24
4	Argentina: Vilma Pailós / 4; María Inés Rodríguez / 10; Martha Orellana / 11	25

- Note: Athletes in parentheses did not score for the team result.

=== Junior (U20) women's race (4 km) ===
Individual race
Rank	Athlete	Country	Time
1st place, gold medalist(s)	Sandra Ruales	Ecuador	14:31
2nd place, silver medalist(s)	Fabiana Cristine da Silva	Brazil	14:48
3rd place, bronze medalist(s)	Miriam Achote	Ecuador	14:50
4	María Eugenia Calle	Ecuador	15:17
5	Ana Silvia de Oliveira	Brazil	15:22
6	Arina Moncayo	Ecuador	15:36
7	Norma Torres	Ecuador	15:39
8	Soledad Nieto	Ecuador	15:50
9	Beatriz Punina	Ecuador	15:55
10	Sandra Torres	Argentina	15:58
	Vivian Magalhães de Aguiar	Brazil	??
	Yenny Bonilla	Colombia	??
	Angela Guerrero	Colombia	??
	Liliana Rodríguez	Colombia	??
	Cristina Ortegón	Colombia	??
	Janeth Caizalitín	Ecuador	??
	Carmen Naranjo	Ecuador	??
	Bertha Vera	Ecuador	??

Teams
Rank	Team	Points
1st place, gold medalist(s)	Ecuador: Sandra Ruales / 1; Miriam Achote / 3; María Eugenia Calle / 4; (Arina Moncayo) / (6)	11
2nd place, silver medalist(s)	Brazil: Fabiana Cristine da Silva / 2; Ana Silvia de Oliveira / 5; Vivian Magalhães de Aguiar / 11	18
3rd place, bronze medalist(s)	Colombia: Yenny Bonilla / ??; Angela Guerrero / ??; Liliana Rodríguez / ??; Cristina Ortegón / ??	39

- Note: Athletes in parentheses did not score for the team result.

=== Youth (U17) women's race (4 km) ===
Individual race
Rank	Athlete	Country	Time
1st place, gold medalist(s)	Bertha Sánchez	Colombia	14:55
2nd place, silver medalist(s)	Carmen Luglia	Ecuador	15:28
3rd place, bronze medalist(s)	Erika Abril	Colombia	15:44
4	Susana Trinak	Argentina	15:53
5	María Vélez	Ecuador	16:09
6	Yolanda Duchi	Ecuador	16:39
7	Mayra Cayza	Ecuador	17:12
8	María Chamorro	Colombia	17:31
9	Rosa Chuqui	Ecuador	21:08

Teams
Rank
Team
Points

Colombia

Bertha Sánchez	1
Erika Abril	3
María Chamorro	8

10

Ecuador

Carmen Luglia	2
María Vélez	5
Yolanda Duchi	6
(Mayra Cayza)	(7)
(Rosa Chuqui)	(9)

14

- Note: Athletes in parentheses did not score for the team result.

== Medal table (unofficial) ==
* Host nation (Colombia)

Rank	Nation	Gold	Silver	Bronze	Total
1	Brazil	6	3	2	11
2	Colombia*	4	1	4	9
3	Ecuador	2	7	3	12
4	Argentina	0	1	1	2
Totals (4 entries)		12	12	10	34

- Note: Totals include both individual and team medals, with medals in the team competition counting as one medal.

== Participation ==
According to an unofficial count, 89 athletes from 5 countries participated.

- Argentina (13)
- Brazil (16)
- Colombia (24)
- Ecuador (34)
- Peru (2)

== See also ==
- 1993 in athletics (track and field)
