= 1986 South American Cross Country Championships =

- Organisers: CONSUDATLE
- Edition: 1st
- Date: May 4
- Host city: San Carlos de Bariloche, Río Negro, Argentina
- Events: 4
- Distances: 12 km – Senior men 8 km – Junior men (U20); 8 km – Senior women 6 km – Junior women (U20)
- Participation: 28 athletes from 4 nations

The 1986 South American Cross Country Championships took place on May 4, 1986. The races were held in San Carlos de Bariloche, Argentina.

Complete results, results for junior and youth competitions, and medal winners were published.

== Medallists ==
| Event | Gold | | Silver | | Bronze | |
|---|---|---|---|---|---|---|
Individual
| Senior men (12 km) | Omar Aguilar; Chile | 39:23 | Alejandro Silva; Chile | 39:42 | Julio César Gómez; Argentina | 39:44 |
| Junior (U20) men (8 km) | Alejandro Aros; Chile | 28:26 | Juan Mesa; Chile | 28:26 | Andrés Alvarado; Chile | 28:31 |
| Senior women (8 km) | Olga Caccaviello; Argentina | 31:52 | Mónica Regonessi; Chile | 32:01 | Stella Maris Selles; Argentina | 32:18 |
| Junior (U20) women (6 km) | María Victoria Biondi; Argentina | 25:02 | Marlene Arellano; Chile | 25:18 | Sandra Vila; Argentina | 25:34 |

== Race results ==
=== Senior men's race (12 km) ===
Individual race
| Rank | Athlete | Country | Time |
|---|---|---|---|
| 1st place, gold medalist(s) | Omar Aguilar | Chile | 39:23 |
| 2nd place, silver medalist(s) | Alejandro Silva | Chile | 39:42 |
| 3rd place, bronze medalist(s) | Julio César Gómez | Argentina | 39:44 |
| 4 | Antonio Silio | Argentina | 40:18 |
| 5 | Roberto Wendorff | Argentina | 40:26 |
| 6 | Jaime Vergara | Chile | 41:44 |
| 7 | Julio Suárez | Uruguay | 41:52 |
| 8 | Telmo Lemos | Uruguay | 42:33 |
| 9 | Rubén Rodríguez | Uruguay | 44:27 |

=== Junior (U20) men's race (8 km) ===
Individual race
| Rank | Athlete | Country | Time |
|---|---|---|---|
| 1st place, gold medalist(s) | Alejandro Aros | Chile | 28:26 |
| 2nd place, silver medalist(s) | Juan Mesa | Chile | 28:26 |
| 3rd place, bronze medalist(s) | Andrés Alvarado | Chile | 28:31 |
| 4 | Oscar Amaya | Argentina | 28:39 |
| 5 | Sergio Toledo | Argentina | 29:25 |
| 6 | Alejandro Barría | Argentina | 29:39 |

=== Senior women's race (8 km) ===
Individual race
| Rank | Athlete | Country | Time |
|---|---|---|---|
| 1st place, gold medalist(s) | Olga Caccaviello | Argentina | 31:52 |
| 2nd place, silver medalist(s) | Mónica Regonessi | Chile | 32:01 |
| 3rd place, bronze medalist(s) | Stella Maris Selles | Argentina | 32:18 |
| 4 | Norma Vallejos | Chile | 32:46 |
| 5 | Graciela Bargas | Argentina | 33:12 |
| 6 | Paola Ramos | Chile | 34:02 |
| 7 | Sonia Galdos | (Peru) Perú | 34:12 |

=== Junior (U20) women's race (6 km) ===
Individual race
| Rank | Athlete | Country | Time |
|---|---|---|---|
| 1st place, gold medalist(s) | María Victoria Biondi | Argentina | 25:02 |
| 2nd place, silver medalist(s) | Marlene Arellano | Chile | 25:18 |
| 3rd place, bronze medalist(s) | Sandra Vila | Argentina | 25:34 |
| 4 | María Inés Rodríguez | Argentina | 25:45 |
| 5 | Marcela Imperatore | Chile | 26:17 |
| 6 | Janette Hernández | Chile | 27:12 |

== Medal table (unofficial) ==
* Host nation (Argentina)

| Rank | Nation | Gold | Silver | Bronze | Total |
|---|---|---|---|---|---|
| 1 | Chile (CHI) | 2 | 4 | 1 | 7 |
| 2 | Argentina (ARG)* | 2 | 0 | 3 | 5 |
| Totals (2 entries) | | 4 | 4 | 4 | 12 |

== Participation ==
According to an unofficial count, 28 athletes from 4 countries participated.

- Argentina (12)
- Chile (12)
- (Peru) Perú (1)
- Uruguay (3)

== See also ==
- 1986 in athletics (track and field)
