= 1988 South American Cross Country Championships =

- Organisers: CONSUDATLE
- Edition: 3rd
- Date: February 22
- Host city: Tandil, Buenos Aires, Argentina
- Events: 4
- Distances: 10 km – Senior men 6 km – Junior men (U20); 6 km – Senior women 4 km – Junior women (U20)
- Participation: 23 athletes from 3 nations

The 1988 South American Cross Country Championships took place on February 22, 1988. The races were held in Tandil, Argentina.

Complete results, results for junior and youth competitions, and medal winners were published.

== Medallists ==
Event	Gold		Silver		Bronze	
Individual
Senior men (12 km)	Antonio Silio; Argentina	33:30	José Calquín; Argentina	33:58	Aldo Pérez; Argentina	34:20
Junior (U20) men (8 km)	Fernando González; Argentina	20:40	José Chacón; Argentina	20:43	Leonardo Malgor; Argentina	20:54
Senior women (8 km)	Stella Maris Selles; Argentina	22:49	Griselda González; Argentina	23:31	Norma Fernández; Argentina	24:04
Junior (U20) women (6 km)	María Valeria Martínez; Argentina	15:45	María Inés Rodríguez; Argentina	16:05	Silvia Buroni; Argentina	16:38

== Race results ==
=== Senior men's race (12 km) ===
Individual race
Rank	Athlete	Country	Time
1st place, gold medalist(s)	Antonio Silio	Argentina	33:30
2nd place, silver medalist(s)	José Calquín	Argentina	33:58
3rd place, bronze medalist(s)	Aldo Pérez	Argentina	34:20
4	Eladio Fernández	Paraguay	34:41
5	Julio Suárez	Uruguay	35:09

=== Junior (U20) men's race (8 km) ===
Individual race
Rank	Athlete	Country	Time
1st place, gold medalist(s)	Fernando González	Argentina	20:40
2nd place, silver medalist(s)	José Chacón	Argentina	20:43
3rd place, bronze medalist(s)	Leonardo Malgor	Argentina	20:54
4	Walter Buzo	Uruguay	21:39
5	Osvaldo Ramírez	Paraguay	21:53
6	Larry Rivero	Uruguay	22:56
7	Gabriel Gadea	Uruguay	22:57

=== Senior women's race (8 km) ===
Individual race
Rank	Athlete	Country	Time
1st place, gold medalist(s)	Stella Maris Selles	Argentina	22:49
2nd place, silver medalist(s)	Griselda González	Argentina	23:31
3rd place, bronze medalist(s)	Norma Fernández	Argentina	24:04
4	Paola Patrón	Uruguay	25:05
5	Adriana Algañaraz	Uruguay	26:38

=== Junior (U20) women's race (6 km) ===
Individual race
Rank	Athlete	Country	Time
1st place, gold medalist(s)	María Valeria Martínez	Argentina	15:45
2nd place, silver medalist(s)	María Inés Rodríguez	Argentina	16:05
3rd place, bronze medalist(s)	Silvia Buroni	Argentina	16:38
4	Serrana Hernández	Uruguay	17:23
5	María Martínez	Paraguay	18:09
6	Emilce Jiménez	Paraguay	19:08

== Medal table (unofficial) ==
* Host nation (Argentina)

Rank	Nation	Gold	Silver	Bronze	Total
1	Argentina (ARG)*	4	4	4	12
Totals (1 entries)		4	4	4	12

== Participation ==
According to an unofficial count, 23 athletes from 3 countries participated.

- Argentina (12)
- Paraguay (4)
- Uruguay (7)

== See also ==
- 1988 in athletics (track and field)
