= 1987 South American Cross Country Championships =

- Organisers: CONSUDATLE
- Edition: 2nd
- Date: June 7
- Host city: Santiago, Chile
- Events: 4
- Distances: 12 km – Senior men 7.8 km – Junior men (U20); 7.8 km – Senior women 5 km – Junior women (U20)
- Participation: 23 athletes from 2 nations

The 1987 South American Cross Country Championships took place on June 7, 1987. The races were held in Santiago, Chile.

Complete results, results for junior and youth competitions, and medal winners were published.

== Medallists ==
Event	Gold		Silver		Bronze	
Individual
Senior men (12 km)	Omar Aguilar; Chile	36:04	Antonio Silio; Argentina	36:20	Jorge Rojas; Chile	37:18
Junior (U20) men (8 km)	Mauricio Díaz; Chile	25:06	Javier Biskupovic; Chile	25:12	Leonardo Malgor; Argentina	25:21
Senior women (8 km)	Mónica Regonessi; Chile	27:56	Griselda González; Argentina	28:16	Stella Maris Selles; Argentina	29:21
Junior (U20) women (6 km)	María Valeria Martínez; Argentina	23:21	Roxana Palavecino; Argentina	23:23	Roxana Coronatti; Argentina	23:30

== Race results ==
=== Senior men's race (12 km) ===
Individual race
Rank	Athlete	Country	Time
1st place, gold medalist(s)	Omar Aguilar	Chile	36:04
2nd place, silver medalist(s)	Antonio Silio	Argentina	36:20
3rd place, bronze medalist(s)	Jorge Rojas	Chile	37:18
4	Marcelo Cascabelo	Argentina	37:37
5	Luis Nempo	Chile	38:12

=== Junior (U20) men's race (8 km) ===
Individual race
Rank	Athlete	Country	Time
1st place, gold medalist(s)	Mauricio Díaz	Chile	25:06
2nd place, silver medalist(s)	Javier Biskupovic	Chile	25:12
3rd place, bronze medalist(s)	Leonardo Malgor	Argentina	25:21
4	Martín Arriagada	Chile	25:33
5	Héctor Aimar	Argentina	25:38
6	Carlos Polito	Argentina	26:17

=== Senior women's race (8 km) ===
Individual race
Rank	Athlete	Country	Time
1st place, gold medalist(s)	Mónica Regonessi	Chile	27:56
2nd place, silver medalist(s)	Griselda González	Argentina	28:16
3rd place, bronze medalist(s)	Stella Maris Selles	Argentina	29:21
4	Beatriz Barberá	Argentina	30:02
5	Marlene Flores	Chile	30:35
6	María Baeza	Chile	33:08

=== Junior (U20) women's race (6 km) ===
Individual race
Rank	Athlete	Country	Time
1st place, gold medalist(s)	María Valeria Martínez	Argentina	23:21
2nd place, silver medalist(s)	Roxana Palavecino	Argentina	23:23
3rd place, bronze medalist(s)	Roxana Coronatti	Argentina	23:30
4	Marlene Arellano	Chile	23:50
5	Pamela Contreras	Chile	24:26
6	Janette Hernández	Chile	25:21

== Medal table (unofficial) ==
* Host nation (Chile)

Rank	Nation	Gold	Silver	Bronze	Total
1	Chile (CHI)*	3	1	1	5
2	Argentina (ARG)	1	3	3	7
Totals (2 entries)		4	4	4	12

== Participation ==
According to an unofficial count, 23 athletes from 2 countries participated.

- Argentina (11)
- Chile (12)

== See also ==
- 1987 in athletics (track and field)
