= 1990 South American Cross Country Championships =

- Organisers: CONSUDATLE
- Edition: 5th
- Date: February 11
- Host city: Caracas, Venezuela
- Events: 4
- Distances: 12 km – Senior men 7.8 km – Junior men (U20); 7.8 km – Senior women 6 km – Junior women (U20)
- Participation: 26 athletes from 3 nations

The 1990 South American Cross Country Championships took place on February 11, 1990. The races were held in Caracas, Venezuela.

Complete results, results for junior and youth competitions, and medal winners were published.

== Medallists ==
Event	Gold		Silver		Bronze	
Individual
Senior men (12 km)	Geraldo Francisco de Assis; Brazil	36:49	Roberto Punina; Ecuador	37:05	Artur da Freitas Castro; Brazil	37:44
Junior (U20) men (8 km)	Robinson Semolini; Brazil	25:15	Jesús Medrano; Venezuela	26:40	Albano Villarroel; Venezuela	27:06
Senior women (8 km)	Rita de Cássia Santos de Jesús; Brazil	27:37	Silvana Pereira; Brazil	27:49	Carmen Naranjo; Ecuador	28:01
Junior (U20) women (6 km)	Sandra Ruales; Ecuador	21:54	Soledad Nieto; Ecuador	21:54	Janeth Caizalitín; Ecuador	22:02

== Race results ==
=== Senior men's race (12 km) ===
Individual race
Rank	Athlete	Country	Time
1st place, gold medalist(s)	Geraldo Francisco de Assis	Brazil	36:49
2nd place, silver medalist(s)	Roberto Punina	Ecuador	37:05
3rd place, bronze medalist(s)	Artur da Freitas Castro	Brazil	37:44
4	Eduardo Navas	Venezuela	37:49
5	Silvio Guerra	Ecuador	37:55
6	Néstor Quinapanta	Ecuador	38:41
7	Amado Rivas	Venezuela	39:02
8	Indelgard Vargas	Venezuela	39:29

=== Junior (U20) men's race (8 km) ===
Individual race
Rank	Athlete	Country	Time
1st place, gold medalist(s)	Robinson Semolini	Brazil	25:15
2nd place, silver medalist(s)	Jesús Medrano	Venezuela	26:40
3rd place, bronze medalist(s)	Albano Villarroel	Venezuela	27:06
4	Juan Guzmán	Venezuela	27:44

=== Senior women's race (8 km) ===
Individual race
Rank	Athlete	Country	Time
1st place, gold medalist(s)	Rita de Cássia Santos de Jesús	Brazil	27:37
2nd place, silver medalist(s)	Silvana Pereira	Brazil	27:49
3rd place, bronze medalist(s)	Carmen Naranjo	Ecuador	28:01
4	Wilma Guerra	Ecuador	28:13
5	Graciela Caizabanda	Ecuador	28:26
6	Carmen Fernández	Venezuela	30:00
7	Milexa Figueroa	Venezuela	33:42
8	Tamara Zagustin	Venezuela	35:06

=== Junior (U20) women's race (6 km) ===
Individual race
Rank	Athlete	Country	Time
1st place, gold medalist(s)	Sandra Ruales	Ecuador	21:54
2nd place, silver medalist(s)	Soledad Nieto	Ecuador	21:54
3rd place, bronze medalist(s)	Janeth Caizalitín	Ecuador	22:02
4	Amelia Villarroel	Venezuela	28:42
5	Francisbel Reyes	Venezuela	30:00
6	Dorelia Lucena	Venezuela	31:36

== Medal table (unofficial) ==
* Host nation (Venezuela)

Rank	Nation	Gold	Silver	Bronze	Total
1	Brazil	3	1	1	5
2	Ecuador	1	2	2	5
3	Venezuela*	0	1	1	2
Totals (3 entries)		4	4	4	12

== Participation ==
According to an unofficial count, 26 athletes from 3 countries participated.

- Brazil (5)
- Ecuador (9)
- Venezuela (12)

== See also ==
- 1990 in athletics (track and field)
