= Luíz Antônio dos Santos =

Brazilian long-distance runner (1964–2021)

Medal record

Men's athletics

Representing Brazil

World Championships
Bronze medal – third place	1995 Gothenburg	Marathon

Luíz Antônio dos Santos (6 September 1964 – 6 November 2021) was a Brazilian long-distance runner who specialized in the marathon. Born in Volta Redonda, Rio de Janeiro, he was a World Championships bronze medalist and a 1996 Olympian. He twice won the Chicago Marathon and also won the Fukuoka Marathon.

== Career ==
Santos's first international appearances came in cross country running. He was part of the Brazilian team at the IAAF World Cross Country Championships in 1991 and 1993, as well as being in the top eight at the South American Cross Country Championships in 1992, 1993 and 1994, sharing in the team gold at the latter two editions. He ran four times at the IAAF World Half Marathon Championships (1993, 1994, 1999, 2001) with his best finish being 22nd in 1994.

He made his marathon debut in Blumenau in 1993, winning the race in a time of 2:12:15. Later that year he won the Chicago Marathon with a time of 2:13:14. This made him the third Brazilian man to win that race, following on from victories by Joseildo Rocha and José Cesar de Souza in the two years previous. He performed less well on his next outing in 1994, failing to finish in Gyeongju, but set a personal best at the Boston Marathon with a time of 2:10:39 hours for thirteenth place. He repeated as winner at the Chicago Marathon, claiming the title again in 2:11:16 hours.

The 1995 season proved to be a career high. He was third at the 1995 Boston Marathon, recording a time of 2:11:02 hours, then took the bronze medal at the 1995 World Championships – his international debut at that distance. He ended his successful year with wins at the São Paulo Marathon and the high level Fukuoka Marathon, where his clocking 2:09:30 was a new personal best. Despite being eleventh at the 1996 Boston Marathon, he represented his native country in the men's marathon at the 1996 Summer Olympics, finishing in tenth place. He attempted a title defence in Fukuoka, but came third overall. He began the 1997 season with sixth place at the Rotterdam Marathon in a lifetime best time of 2:08:55 hours. He placed fifth at the 1997 World Championships in Athletics, which led the Brazilian men to the team bronze medal in the 1997 World Marathon Cup.

Santos was runner-up at the Rio de Janeiro Marathon in 1998 and came eleventh in Chicago later that year. He made three marathon appearances in 1999: fourth at the Tokyo International Marathon, eighth in São Paulo and fifth in Hokkaido. His performances declined thereafter, though he made two more international appearances for Brazil in the South American Marathon Cup.

== International competitions ==
Representing Brazil
Year	Competition	Venue	Position	Event	Notes
1991	World Cross Country Championships	Antwerp, Belgium	77th	Senior race	35:39
1991	World Cross Country Championships	Antwerp, Belgium	11th	Team	492 pts
1992	South American Cross Country Championships	São Paulo, Brazil	5th	Senior race	37:48
1992	IAAF World Road Relay Championships	Funchal, Portugal	9th	Leg 6	21:16
1993	South American Cross Country Championships	Cali, Colombia	8th	Senior race	36:55
1993	South American Cross Country Championships	Cali, Colombia	1st	Team	13 pts
1993	World Cross Country Championships	Amorebieta, Spain	183rd	Senior race	37:06
1993	World Half Marathon Championships	Brussels, Belgium	42nd	Half marathon	1:03:11
1993	World Half Marathon Championships	Brussels, Belgium	10th	Team	3:08:01
1994	South American Cross Country Championships	Manaus, Brazil	5th	Senior race	39:40
1994	South American Cross Country Championships	Manaus, Brazil	1st	Team	10 pts
1994	World Half Marathon Championships	Oslo, Norway	22nd	Half marathon	1:02:28
1994	World Half Marathon Championships	Oslo, Norway	6th	Team	3:07:47
1995	World Championships	Gothenburg, Sweden	3rd	Marathon	2:12:49
1996	Olympic Games	Atlanta, United States	10th	Marathon	2:15:55
1997	World Championships	Athens, Greece	5th	Marathon	2:15:31
1997	World Marathon Cup	Athens, Greece	3rd	Team	7:02:56
1999	World Half Marathon Championships	Palermo, Italy	—	Half marathon	DNF
2000	South American Marathon Cup	São Paulo, Brazil	6th	Marathon	2:18:24
2001	World Half Marathon Championships	Bristol, United Kingdom	61st	Half marathon	1:04:26
2001	World Half Marathon Championships	Bristol, United Kingdom	16th	Team	3:13:56
2001	South American Marathon Cup	São Paulo, Brazil	7th	Marathon	2:19:55

== See also ==
- List of World Championships in Athletics medalists (men)
- List of winners of the Chicago Marathon
- Marathons at the World Championships in Athletics
- Brazil at the World Championships in Athletics
