= 2000 South American Cross Country Championships =

Running race

- Organisers: CONSUDATLE
- Edition: 15th
- Date: February 5–6
- Host city: Cartagena de Indias, Bolívar, Colombia
- Events: 8
- Distances: 12 km – Senior men 4 km – Men's short 8 km – Junior men (U20); 4 km – Youth men (U18); 8 km – Senior women 4 km – Women's short 6 km – Junior women (U20); 3 km – Youth women (U18)
- Participation: 81 + 69 foreign guests + 45 locals athletes from 7 + 8 guest nations nations

The 2000 South American Cross Country Championships took place on February 5–6, 2000. The races were held in Cartagena de Indias, Colombia, jointly with the Central American and Caribbean Cross Country Championships.

Complete results, results for junior and youth competitions, and medal winners were published.

== Medallists ==
=== South American Cross Country Championships ===
Event	Gold		Silver		Bronze	
Individual
Senior men (12 km)	Daniel Lopes Ferreira; Brazil	37:14	Silvio Guerra; Ecuador	37:21	Marílson Gomes dos Santos; Brazil	37:59
Men's short (4 km)	Daniel Lopes Ferreira; Brazil	11:59	Freddy González; Venezuela	12:00	Celso Ficagna; Brazil	12:06
Junior (U20) men (8 km)	James Vidal; Colombia	25:41	Jonathan Monje; Chile	25:52	Víctor Hugo Ocampo; Colombia	26:10
Youth (U18) men (4 km)	Yeisson Caucali; Colombia	12:49	Giovanny Amador; Colombia	12:53	Wendell Hébio da Conceição; Brazil	13:00
Senior women (8 km)	Bertha Sánchez; Colombia	28:10	Lidia Karwowski; Brazil	28:12	Érika Alejandra Olivera; Chile	28:12
Women's short (4 km)	Fabiana Cristine da Silva; Brazil	13:13	Bertha Sánchez; Colombia	13:24	Érika Alejandra Olivera; Chile	13:24
Junior (U20) women (6 km)	Lucélia de Oliveira Peres; Brazil	22:10	Tatiana de Souza Sá; Brazil	22:19	Valquíria Silva Santos; Brazil	23:01
Youth (U18) women (3 km)	Jennifer Garzón; Colombia	11:30	Michelli de Carvalho; Brazil	11:36	Lina María Arias; Colombia	11:41
Team
Senior men	Brazil	8	Ecuador	15	(Panama) Panamá	42
Men's short	Brazil	10	Venezuela	19	Colombia	20
Junior (U20) men	Colombia	12	Ecuador	20	Chile	24
Youth (U18) men	Colombia	6				
Senior women	Brazil	11	Chile; Colombia	21		
Women's short	Brazil	11	Colombia	23	Chile	25
Junior (U20) women	Brazil	6	Colombia	22	Ecuador	23
Youth (U18) women	Colombia	13				

=== Central American and Caribbean Cross Country Championships ===
This is an unofficial extraction from the results.

Event	Gold		Silver		Bronze	
Individual
Senior men (12 km)	Fidencio Torres (Mexico) México	38:40	Salvador Miranda (Mexico) México	38:51	José Macías (Mexico) México	39:29
Junior (U20) men (8 km)	José Luis Santos (Mexico) México	25:39	James Vidal; Colombia	25:41	Víctor Hugo Ocampo; Colombia	26:10
Senior women (8 km)	Bertha Sánchez; Colombia	28:10	América Mateos (Mexico) México	28:23	Mardrea Hyman; Jamaica	28:53
Junior (U20) women (6 km)	Alma Xicoténcatl (Mexico) México	22:21	Luisa Jiménez; Colombia	23:15	Fabiola Juárez (Mexico) México	23:21
Team
Senior men	(Mexico) México	10	(Panama) Panamá	66	Jamaica	67
Junior (U20) men	Guatemala	32	Puerto Rico	56	Jamaica	59
Senior women	(Mexico) México	11	Colombia	18	Guatemala	31
Junior (U20) women	(Mexico) México; Colombia	11			Puerto Rico	26

== Race results ==
=== Senior men's race (12 km) ===
Individual race
Rank	Athlete	Country	Time
—	João N'Tyamba	Angola	37:11
1st place, gold medalist(s)	Daniel Lopes Ferreira	Brazil	37:14
2nd place, silver medalist(s)	Silvio Guerra	Ecuador	37:21
3rd place, bronze medalist(s)	Marílson Gomes dos Santos	Brazil	37:59
—	Fidencio Torres	(Mexico) México	38:40
4	Benedito Donizetti Gomes	Brazil	38:45
—	Salvador Miranda	(Mexico) México	38:51
—	William Ramírez	Colombia	39:14
—	José Macías	(Mexico) México	39:29
5	Néstor Quinapanta	Ecuador	39:35
—	José Luis Villanueva	(Mexico) México	39:42
6	Wellington Correia Fraga	Brazil	39:46
—	José Amado García	Guatemala	39:50
7	Ademir Fernandes da Silva	Brazil	39:53
—	Juan Carlos Hernández	Colombia	39:53
—	Wilmer Moreno	Colombia	39:59
8	Washington Tenorio	Ecuador	40:04
—	Francisco Gómez Vega	Costa Rica	40:10
—	John Freddy Torres	Colombia	40:11
—	Luis Collazo	Puerto Rico	40:14
—	Selvin Molineros	Guatemala	40:17
9	Leónidas Rivadeneira	Chile	40:19
—	Víctor Velázquez	Guatemala	40:22
10	Rolando Pillco	Bolivia	40:48
11	Wilson Wall	Chile	40:56
12	Richard Arias	Ecuador	41:03
13	Agustín Morán	(Panama) Panamá	41:12
—	Winston Taylor	Jamaica	41:20
—	Zepherinus Joseph	Saint Lucia	41:25
—	Joaquín Córdoba	Colombia	41:39
14	Simón Alvarado	(Panama) Panamá	41:47
—	Claudio Cabán	Puerto Rico	41:51
—	Michel Tomlin	Jamaica	41:52
15	Guillermo Ramírez	(Panama) Panamá	42:15
16	Mauricio Ladino	Colombia	42:16
—	Victor Ledgers	Saint Lucia	42:19
—	Wayne St. Ange	Saint Lucia	42:27
—	Daniel Castillo	Colombia	42:32
—	Kerlyn Brown	Jamaica	42:36
—	Robert Watson	Jamaica	42:49
—	Delroy Hayden	Jamaica	43:02
—	Mauricio Naranjo	Colombia	43:24
—	Andrés Rizo	Costa Rica	43:30
—	Stephen Ason	Saint Lucia	43:37
—	Guido Alzate	Colombia	43:49
—	Germán Rodriguez	Colombia	44:21
—	Omar Brooks	Jamaica	44:36
—	Michael Losmay	Saint Lucia	45:02
—	John Grajales	Colombia	45:04
17	Héctor Martínez	(Panama) Panamá	45:08
18	Ricardo Concepción	(Panama) Panamá	45:31

Teams
Rank	Team	Points
1st place, gold medalist(s)	Brazil: Daniel Lopes Ferreira / 1; Marilson Gomes dos Santos / 3; Benedito Donizetti Gomes / 4; (Wellington Correia Fraga) / (6); (Ademir Fernandes da Silva) / (7)	8
2nd place, silver medalist(s)	Ecuador: Silvio Guerra / 2; Néstor Quinapanta / 5; Washington Tenorio / 8; (Richard Arias) / (12)	15
3rd place, bronze medalist(s)	(Panama) Panamá: Agustín Morán / 13; Simón Alvarado / 14; Guillermo Ramírez / 15; (Héctor Martínez) / (17); (Ricardo Concepción) / (18)	42

- Note: Athletes in parentheses did not score for the team result.

=== Men's short race (4 km) ===
Individual race
Rank	Athlete	Country	Time
1st place, gold medalist(s)	Daniel Lopes Ferreira	Brazil	11:59
2nd place, silver medalist(s)	Freddy González	Venezuela	12:00
3rd place, bronze medalist(s)	Celso Ficagna	Brazil	12:06
4	Juan Carlos Gutiérrez	Colombia	12:06
5	Emigdio Delgado	Venezuela	12:09
6	Daniel Bernardo das Neves	Brazil	12:13
7	Mauricio Ladino	Colombia	12:18
8	Wilson Wall	Chile	12:25
9	William Roldán	Colombia	12:32
10	Leónidas Rivadeneira	Chile	12:33
11	Rolando Ortiz^{†}	Colombia	12:41
12	Froilán Bonilla	Venezuela	12:47
13	Agustín Morán	(Panama) Panamá	12:53
14	Mark Olivo	Venezuela	12:56
15	José Alirio Carrasco	Colombia	13:06
16	Simón Alvarado	(Panama) Panamá	13:07
17	Guillermo Ramírez	(Panama) Panamá	13:19
18	Héctor Martínez	(Panama) Panamá	14:11
19	Ricardo Concepción	(Panama) Panamá	14:28

^{†}: Athlete marked as guest, but accounted for team score.

Teams
Rank	Team	Points
1st place, gold medalist(s)	Brazil: Daniel Lopes Ferreira / 1; Celso Ficagna / 3; Daniel Bernardo das Neves / 6	10
2nd place, silver medalist(s)	Venezuela: Freddy González / 2; Emigdio Delgado / 5; Froilán Bonilla / 12; (Mark Olivo) / (14)	19
3rd place, bronze medalist(s)	Colombia: Juan Carlos Gutiérrez / 4; Mauricio Ladino / 7; William Roldán / 9; (Rolando Ortiz)^{†} / (11); (José Alirio Carrasco) / (15)	20
4	(Panama) Panamá: Agustín Morán / 13; Simón Alvarado / 16; Guillermo Ramírez / 17; (Héctor Martínez) / (18); (Ricardo Concepción) / (19)	46

- Note: Athletes in parentheses did not score for the team result.

^{†}: Athlete marked as guest, but accounted for team score.

=== Junior (U20) men's race (8 km) ===
Individual race
Rank	Athlete	Country	Time
—	José Luis Santos	(Mexico) México	25:39
1st place, gold medalist(s)	James Vidal	Colombia	25:41
2nd place, silver medalist(s)	Jonathan Monje	Chile	25:52
—	Adalberto Castillo	Colombia	26:03
3rd place, bronze medalist(s)	Víctor Hugo Ocampo	Colombia	26:10
—	Sergio de León	Guatemala	26:14
—	Anacleto Salazar	(Mexico) México	26:25
4	José da Silva	Brazil	26:28
5	Mesías Zapata	Ecuador	26:35
—	Gonzálo Equite	Guatemala	26:39
—	Víctor Jacobo Solís	Guatemala	26:41
6	César Pilaluisa	Ecuador	26:46
7	Franck Caldeira de Almeida	Brazil	26:47
8	Jaime Baquero	Colombia	27:03
9	Ángel Campos	Ecuador	27:11
10	Marcel Siefert	Chile	27:19
—	José Nevares	Puerto Rico	27:35
—	Nabor Pérez	(Mexico) México	27:44
—	Edwin Cedeño	Puerto Rico	27:49
11	Byron Piedra	Ecuador	28:01
12	Luis Gamin	Chile	28:14
—	Mario Smith	Jamaica	28:19
—	Leon Foster	Jamaica	28:26
—	Joan Méndez	Puerto Rico	28:42
—	Francisco Sánez	Guatemala	28:50
—	Andre Crawford	Jamaica	28:54
—	Alexander Rendón	Colombia	28:55
—	Guillermo Martínez	Colombia	29:21
—	César Lozano	Costa Rica	29:28
—	Lerone Lawson	Jamaica	29:56
—	Gregory McKenzie	Jamaica	30:07
—	Winder Marin	Colombia	30:26
—	Omar Powell	Jamaica	31:06
—	Yusmi Chamorro	Colombia	31:24
—	O'Neill Williams	Bahamas	31:47
—	Leider Lara	Colombia	31:51
—	Ariel Vásquez	Puerto Rico	32:04
—	Ricardo Carillo	Colombia	32:08
—	Edison Henao	Colombia	32:44
—	Mario Alvarez	Colombia	33:04
—	Julio Reyes	Colombia	33:53
—	André Rolle	Bahamas	33:55

Teams
Rank	Team	Points
1st place, gold medalist(s)	Colombia: James Vidal / 1; Víctor Hugo Ocampo / 3; Jaime Baquero / 8	12
2nd place, silver medalist(s)	Ecuador: Mesías Zapata / 5; César Pilaluisa / 6; Ángel Campos / 9; (Byron Piedra) / (11)	20
3rd place, bronze medalist(s)	Chile: Jonathan Monje / 2; Marcel Siefert / 10; Luis Gamin / 12	24

- Note: Athletes in parentheses did not score for the team result.

=== Youth (U18) men's race (4 km) ===
Individual race
Rank	Athlete	Country	Time
1st place, gold medalist(s)	Yeisson Caucali	Colombia	12:49
2nd place, silver medalist(s)	Giovanny Amador	Colombia	12:53
3rd place, bronze medalist(s)	Wendell Hébio da Conceição	Brazil	13:00
4	James Murillo	Colombia	13:01
5	Erick Molina	Bolivia	13:26
—	Edison Pico	Colombia	13:26
—	Lenin Montero	Colombia	13:49
—	José Ramírez	Colombia	13:49
—	Jaime Castillo	Colombia	14:31
—	Mario Meneses	Colombia	14:41
—	Arnold Caicedo	Colombia	14:52
—	Felipe Perez	Colombia	15:04
—	Luis Herrera	Colombia	15:36
—	Luis Martínez	Colombia	15:46
—	José Luis Cárdenas	Colombia	16:02
—	Eder Franco	Colombia	16:38
—	Hand Sands	Colombia	17:20

Teams
Rank

Team
Colombia

Yeisson Caucali	1
Giovanny Amador	2
James Murillo	4

Points
6

- Note: Athletes in parentheses did not score for the team result.

=== Senior women's race (8 km) ===
Individual race
Rank	Athlete	Country	Time
1st place, gold medalist(s)	Bertha Sánchez	Colombia	28:10
2nd place, silver medalist(s)	Lidia Karwowski	Brazil	28:12
3rd place, bronze medalist(s)	Érika Alejandra Olivera	Chile	28:12
4	Adriana de Souza	Brazil	28:22
—	América Mateos	(Mexico) México	28:23
—	Mardrea Hyman	Jamaica	28:53
—	Dulce María Rodríguez	(Mexico) México	28:56
5	Maria Cristina Bernardo Vaqueiro Rodrigues	Brazil	29:04
6	Rosangela Raimunda Pereira Faria	Brazil	29:26
—	Martha Garcés	(Mexico) México	29:40
—	Giselle Bautista	(Mexico) México	29:46
7	María Paredes	Ecuador	29:46
8	Clara Morales	Chile	29:47
9	Miriam Pulido	Colombia	29:51
—	Dina Cruz	Guatemala	29:54
—	Elsa Monterroso	Guatemala	30:05
10	Flor Venegas	Chile	30:10
11	Cecilia Rojas	Colombia	30:20
12	Lilian Guerra	Ecuador	30:26
—	Esneda Londoño	Colombia	30:31
13	Narcisa Calderón	Ecuador	30:58
14	Erika Abril	Colombia	31:24
15	Anahí Soto	Chile	31:32
—	Marcela Jackson	Costa Rica	31:34
16	Karina Moncayo	Ecuador	32:00
—	Luz Chuquillo	Colombia	32:11
—	Herlinda Xol	Guatemala	32:49
—	Judith Thomas	Jamaica	34:19
—	Paula Whitmore	Jamaica	34:41
—	Candia Esnard	Saint Lucia	34:54
—	Priscila Emmanuel	Saint Lucia	36:38
—	Juliena Actie	Saint Lucia	37:10
—	Jodie Johnson	Jamaica	37:40

Teams
Rank	Team	Points
1st place, gold medalist(s)	Brazil: Lidia Karwowski / 2; Adriana de Souza / 4; Maria Cristina Bernardo Vaqueiro Rodrigues / 5; (Rosangela Raimunda Pereira Faria) / (6)	11
2nd place, silver medalist(s)	Chile: Érika Alejandra Olivera / 3; Clara Morales / 8; Flor Venegas / 10; (Anahí Soto) / (15)	21
2nd place, silver medalist(s)	Colombia: Bertha Sánchez / 1; Miriam Pulido / 9; Cecilia Rojas / 11; (Erika Abril) / (14)	21
4	Ecuador: María Paredes / 7; Lilian Guerra / 12; Narcisa Calderón / 13; (Karina Moncayo) / (16)	32

- Note: Athletes in parentheses did not score for the team result.

=== Women's short race (4 km) ===
Individual race
Rank	Athlete	Country	Time
1st place, gold medalist(s)	Fabiana Cristine da Silva	Brazil	13:13
2nd place, silver medalist(s)	Bertha Sánchez	Colombia	13:24
3rd place, bronze medalist(s)	Érika Alejandra Olivera	Chile	13:24
4	Selma Cândida dos Reis	Brazil	13:39
5	Niusha Mancilla	Bolivia	13:53
6	Ana Paula de Almeida Ferreira	Brazil	13:56
7	María Paredes	Ecuador	13:58
8	Elizabeth Esteves de Souza	Brazil	14:03
9	Clara Morales	Chile	14:04
10	Miriam Pulido	Colombia	14:05
11	Cecilia Rojas	Colombia	14:09
12	Narcisa Calderón	Ecuador	14:10
13	Anahí Soto	Chile	14:11
14	Flor Venegas	Chile	14:11
15	Lilian Guerra	Ecuador	14:16
—	Esneda Londoño	Colombia	14:19
16	Susana Rebolledo	Chile	14:37
17	Erika Abril	Colombia	14:58
18	Silvia Paredes	Ecuador	15:19
19	Karina Moncayo	Ecuador	15:36

Teams
Rank	Team	Points
1st place, gold medalist(s)	Brazil: Fabiana Cristine da Silva / 1; Selma Cândida dos Reis / 4; Ana Paula de Almeida Ferreira / 6; (Elizabeth Esteves de Souza) / (8)	11
2nd place, silver medalist(s)	Colombia: Bertha Sánchez / 2; Miriam Pulido / 10; Cecilia Rojas / 11; (Erika Abril) / (17)	23
3rd place, bronze medalist(s)	Chile: Érika Alejandra Olivera / 3; Clara Morales / 9; Anahí Soto / 13; (Flor Venegas) / (14); (Susana Rebolledo) / (16)	25
4	Ecuador: María Paredes / 7; Narcisa Calderón / 12; Lilian Guerra / 15; (Silvia Paredes) / (18); (Karina Moncayo) / (19)	34

- Note: Athletes in parentheses did not score for the team result.

=== Junior (U20) women's race (6 km) ===
Individual race
Rank	Athlete	Country	Time
1st place, gold medalist(s)	Lucélia de Oliveira Peres	Brazil	22:10
2nd place, silver medalist(s)	Tatiana de Souza Sá	Brazil	22:19
—	Alma Xicoténcatl	(Mexico) México	22:21
3rd place, bronze medalist(s)	Valquíria Silva Santos	Brazil	23:01
4	Adriana Aparecida da Silva	Brazil	23:11
5	Luisa Jiménez	Colombia	23:15
6	Marlene Acuña	Ecuador	23:18
—	Fabiola Juárez	(Mexico) México	23:21
7	Silvia Paredes	Ecuador	23:22
8	Martha Roncería	Colombia	23:29
9	Mercedes Aguilar	Colombia	23:35
10	Sara Nivicela	Ecuador	23:38
—	María del Pilar Díaz	Puerto Rico	23:47
—	Irene González	(Mexico) México	23:59
—	Olga Rodas	Guatemala	24:42
—	Yaritza Rivera	Puerto Rico	24:54
—	Beverly Morris	Jamaica	24:55
—	Lisayra del Valle	Puerto Rico	24:58
—	Lorraine McKenzie	Jamaica	25:29
—	Helena Isaza	Colombia	25:12
—	Kerry-Ann White	Jamaica	25:47
—	Nicola Smith	Jamaica	27:41

Teams
Rank	Team	Points
1st place, gold medalist(s)	Brazil: Lucélia de Oliveira Peres / 1; Tatiana de Souza Sá / 2; Valquíria Silva Santos / 3; (Adriana Aparecida da Silva) / (4)	6
2nd place, silver medalist(s)	Colombia: Luisa Jiménez / 5; Martha Roncería / 8; Mercedes Aguilar / 9	22
3rd place, bronze medalist(s)	Ecuador: Marlene Acuña / 6; Silvia Paredes / 7; Sara Nivicela / 10	23

- Note: Athletes in parentheses did not score for the team result.

=== Youth (U18) women's race (3 km) ===
Individual race
Rank	Athlete	Country	Time
1st place, gold medalist(s)	Jennifer Garzón	Colombia	11:30
2nd place, silver medalist(s)	Michelli de Carvalho	Brazil	11:36
3rd place, bronze medalist(s)	Lina María Arias	Colombia	11:41
—	Adriana Molano	Colombia	11:50
—	Diana Alzate	Colombia	12:08
4	Cristina Tovar	Venezuela	12:08
—	Martha Rojas	Colombia	12:14
—	Diana Díaz	Colombia	12:31
5	Ruby Riativa	Colombia	12:35
—	Ayde Meneses	Colombia	13:08
—	Cristina Herrera	Colombia	13:24
—	Natalia Montoya	Colombia	14:01
—	Diana Sosa	Colombia	14:08
—	Karine Montero	Colombia	15:30

Teams
Rank

Team
Colombia

Jennifer Garzón	1
Lina María Arias	3
Ruby Riativa	9

Points
13

- Note: Athletes in parentheses did not score for the team result.

== Medal table (unofficial) ==
=== South American Cross Country Championships ===
* Host nation (Host nation)

Rank	Nation	Gold	Silver	Bronze	Total
1	Brazil	9	3	4	16
2	Colombia*	7	5	3	15
3	Ecuador	0	3	1	4
4	Chile	0	2	4	6
5	Venezuela	0	2	0	2
6	Panama	0	0	1	1
Totals (6 entries)		16	15	13	44

- Note: Totals include both individual and team medals, with medals in the team competition counting as one medal.

=== Central American and Caribbean Cross Country Championships ===
* Host nation (Host nation)

Rank	Nation	Gold	Silver	Bronze	Total
1	Mexico	6	2	2	10
2	Colombia*	2	3	1	6
3	Guatemala	1	0	1	2
4	Puerto Rico	0	1	1	2
5	Panama	0	1	0	1
6	Jamaica	0	0	3	3
Totals (6 entries)		9	7	8	24

- Note: Totals include both individual and team medals, with medals in the team competition counting as one medal.

== Participation ==
According to an unofficial count, a total of 195 athletes from 16 countries participated.

=== South American Cross Country Championships ===
According to an unofficial count, 81 athletes from 7 countries were competing for the South American Cross Country Championships.

- Bolivia (3)
- Brazil (23)
- Chile (10)
- Colombia (20)
- Ecuador (15)
- (Panama) Panamá (5)
- Venezuela (5)

=== Central American and Caribbean Cross Country Championships ===
According to an unofficial count, 86 athletes from 9 countries were competing for the Central American and Caribbean Cross Country Championships. 13 athletes from Colombia and 5 athletes from Panamá competed for both championships.

- Bahamas (2)
- Colombia (13)
- Costa Rica (4)
- Guatemala (11)
- Jamaica (20)
- (Mexico) México (14)
- (Panama) Panamá (5)
- Puerto Rico (9)
- Saint Lucia (8)

=== Guests ===
In addition, one African guest athlete, and 45 local Colombian athletes participated.

- Angola (1)
- Colombia (45 local athletes)

== See also ==
- 2000 in athletics (track and field)
