= 1992 South American Cross Country Championships =

- Organisers: CONSUDATLE
- Edition: 7th
- Date: January 4–5
- Host city: São Paulo, Brazil
- Venue: Jóckey Club
- Events: 6
- Distances: 12 km – Senior men 7.5 km – Junior men (U20); 4.5 km – Youth men (U17); 6 km – Senior women 4.5 km – Junior women (U20); 3 km – Youth women (U17)
- Participation: at least 4 nations

The 1992 South American Cross Country Championships took place on January 4–5, 1992. The races were held at the Jóckey Club in São Paulo, Brazil.

Medal winners, and medal winners for junior and youth competitions were published.

== Medallists ==
Event	Gold		Silver		Bronze	
Individual
Senior men (12 km)	Valdenor dos Santos; Brazil	37:30	Benedito Gomes; Brazil	37:35	Clair Wathier; Brazil	37:41
Junior (U20) men (7.5 km)	Emerson Vettori; Brazil	23:48	William Roldán; Colombia	23:52	Emerson Iser Bem; Brazil	24:15
Youth (U17) men (4.5 km)	Carlos Torres Gomes; Brazil	15:00	Marcelo Ferreira da Silva; Brazil	15:03	Marcelo Zabala; Argentina	16:04
Senior women (6 km)	Carmem de Oliveira; Brazil	20:34	Solange Cordeiro de Souza; Brazil	20:48	Martha Tenorio; Ecuador	21:14
Junior (U20) women (4.5 km)	Ana de Oliveira; Brazil	16:45	Cláudia da Costa; Brazil	17:35	Edileuza Ribeiro; Brazil	18:26
Youth (U17) women (3 km)	Fernanda Rodríguez; Argentina	11:36	Daiany de Siqueira; Brazil	12:48		

== Medal table (unofficial) ==
* Host nation (Brazil)

Rank	Nation	Gold	Silver	Bronze	Total
1	Brazil*	5	5	3	13
2	Argentina	1	0	1	2
3	Colombia	0	1	0	1
4	Ecuador	0	0	1	1
Totals (4 entries)		6	6	5	17

== Participation ==
Athletes from at least 4 countries participated.

- Argentina
- Brazil
- Colombia
- Ecuador

== See also ==
- 1992 in athletics (track and field)
