= Bank of Guatemala =

Monetary authority of Guatemala

Bank of Guatemala Banco de Guatemala
- Seal of the Bank of Guatemala

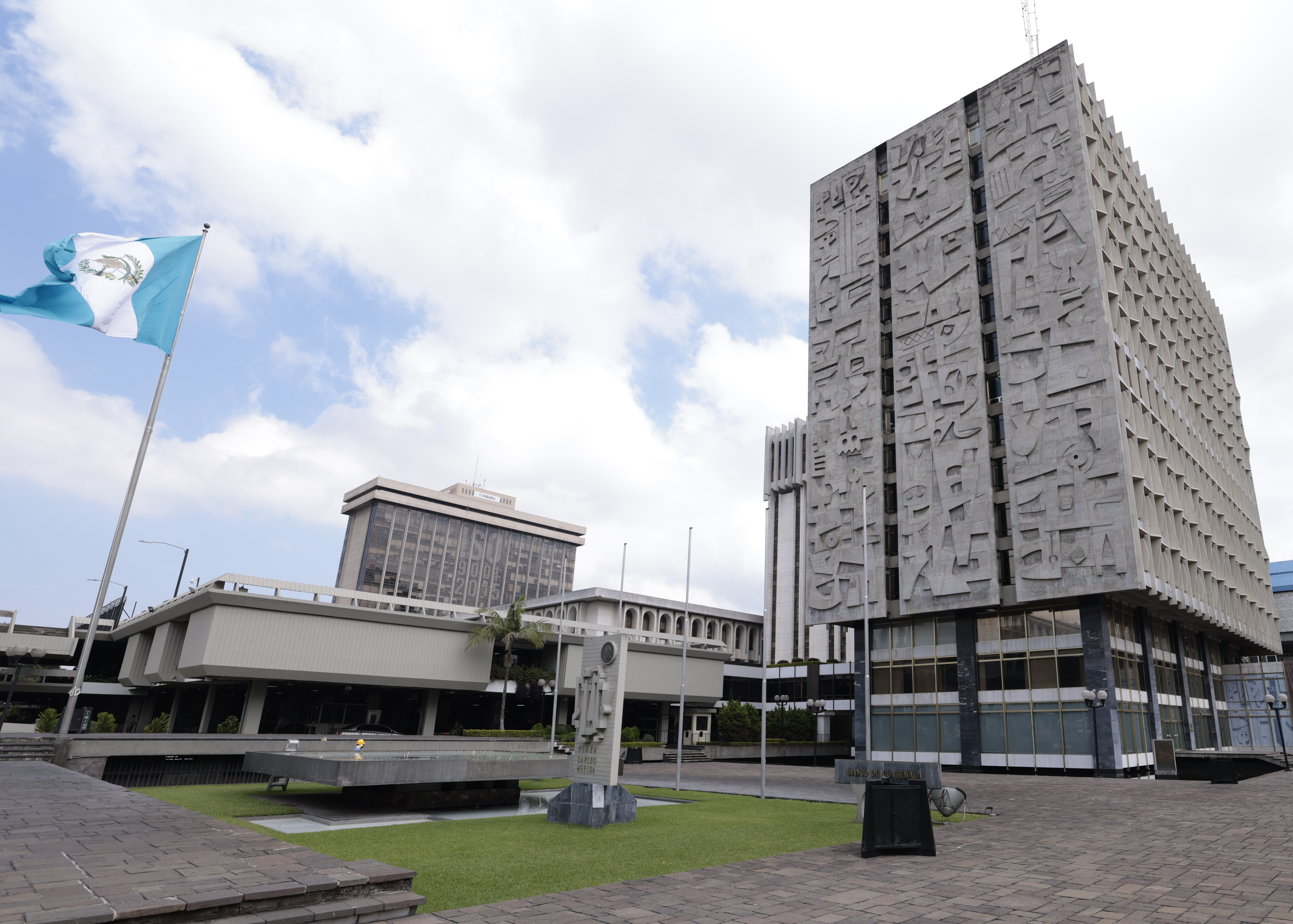
- Headquarters
- Central bank of: Guatemala
- Headquarters: Guatemala City, Guatemala, Guatemala
- Established: 1945
- Ownership: 100% state ownership
- President of the Bank of Guatemala: Alvaro González Ricci
- Currency: Guatemalan quetzal GTQ (ISO 4217)
- Reserves: 7 270 million USD
- Bank rate: 3.50%
- Website: www.banguat.gob.gt

The Bank of Guatemala (Spanish: Banco de Guatemala) is the central bank of Guatemala and was established in its current form in 1945. The Central Bank of Guatemala was established by President José María Orellana in 1926, after prior governments consulted Edwin W. Kemmerer.

== History ==
=== Pre-1948 ===
President Manuel Estrada Cabrera invited Edwin W. Kemmerer to study Guatemala's monetary condition in 1919, and his suggestions included creating a central bank. The establishment of a central bank was hampered by Estrada and Carlos Herrera being overthrown. The Guatemalan quetzal was created in November 1924, and the Central Bank of Guatemala was established on 30 June 1926, by President José María Orellana. Guatemala's monetary policy was based on the gold standard.

The Crédito Hipotecario Nacional, a state-backed financial institution, was established in 1929, and most of its credit was given for short-term basis agricultural work.

=== Post-1945 ===
The Ministry of Economy and Labor was established by the 1945 Constitution of Guatemala. The Bank of Guatemala was established that year as a central bank. This institution replaced the Central Bank of Guatemala. The legislation establishing the bank created a monetary board of six members. The president and vice-president of the bank were appointed by the president of Guatemala to six year terms.

Lending to cotton growers massively increased across Central America during the 1950s. The Bank of Guatemala stimulated this by rediscounting private bank loans to cotton growers at a favorable rate. By 1964, 40% of all rediscounted loans by the Bank of Guatemala were related to cotton.

A complex for the Bank of Guatemala was constructed from 1962 to 1966, and inaugurated in 1966. Raúl Minondo and Jorge Montes designed the building using International Style. The 17 storey high building was the tallest building in Guatemala at the time.

In 2015, the head of the Bank of Guatemala was arrested as part of the La Línea corruption case.

== Money supply ==
Supply of Guatemalan quetzal in milloins
Year	Bank of Guatemala	Other banks	Total	Reference(s)
1946	57.6	52.6	5.0	
1947	63.0	55.5	7.5	
1948	63.7	54.1	9.5	
1949	65.2	52.9	12.3	
1950	65.6	53.2	12.3	
1951	69.8	56.5	13.3	
1952	73.5	61.9	11.6	
1953	85.4	73.0	12.3	
1954	93.1	78.9	14.2	
1955	103.8	85.2	18.6	

== Presidents of the Bank of Guatemala ==
1. Manuel Noriega Morales (1946–1954)
2. Manuel Béndfeldt Jáuregui (1954)
3. Gabriel Orellana Estrada (1954–1958)
4. Gustavo Mirón Porras (1958–1960)
5. Arturo Pérez Galliano (1960–1966)
6. Francisco Fernández Rivas (1966–1970)
7. Augusto Contreras Godoy (1970–1974)
8. Manuel Méndez Escobar (1974–1978)
9. Plinio Alfredo Grazioso Barrilas (1978–1982)
10. Jorge González del Valle (1982)
11. Armando González Campo (1983)
12. Carlos Humberto Alpíre Pérez (1983–1984)
13. Oscar Alvarez Marroquín (1984–1985)
14. Jorge Luis Monzón Juárez (1985–1986)
15. José Federico Linares Martínez (1986–1987)
16. José Miguel Gaitán Ramírez (1987–1989)
17. Lizardo Arturo Sosa López (1989–1990)
18. Oscar Humberto Pineda Robles (1990–1991)
19. José Federico Linares Martínez (1991–1993)
20. Lizardo Arturo Sosa López (1993)
21. Willy Waldemar Zapata Sagastume (1993–1997)
22. Edin Homero Velázquez Escobedo (1997–2000)
23. Lizardo Arturo Sosa Ramirez (2000–2006)
24. María Antonieta Del Cid Navas de Bonilla (2006–2010)
25. Edgar Baltazar Barquín Dúran (2010–2014)
26. Julio Roberto Suárez Guerra (2014–2018)
27. Sergio Francisco Recinos Rivera (2018–2022)
28. Alvaro González Ricci (2022–present)

Source: Bank of Guatemala

== See also ==
- Ministry of Public Finance
- Economy of Guatemala
- Guatemalan quetzal
- List of central banks

== Works cited ==
=== Books ===
- Grandia, Liza (2024). Kernels of Resistance: Maize, Food Sovereignty, and Collective Power. University of Washington Press. ISBN 9780295753294.
- Gregg, Davis; McGill, Dan (1959). World Insurance Trends. University of Pennsylvania Press.
- Williams, Robert (1986). Export Agriculture and the Crisis in Central America. University of North Carolina Press. ISBN 0807816930.

=== Journals ===
- Immerman, Richard (1980). "Guatemala as Cold War History". Political Science Quarterly. 95 (4). Academy of Political Science: 629–653. doi:10.2307/2150608. JSTOR 2150608.
- Kirkpatrick, Michael (2014). "Mid-twentieth-century Guatemalan modernism and the anesthetic of progress". Canadian Journal of Latin American and Caribbean Studies. 39 (1). Taylor & Francis: 3–21. doi:10.2307/26587996. JSTOR 26587996.
- Laso, Eduardo (1958). "Financial Policies and Credit Control Techniques in Central America". Staff Papers. 6 (3). Palgrave Macmillan: 427–460. doi:10.2307/3866030. JSTOR 3866030.

=== Web ===
- "Chronology of Banco de Guatemala Authorities: Presidents, Vice Presidents and Managers". Bank of Guatemala. Archived from the original on 26 May 2026.
- "Historical Review". Bank of Guatemala. Archived from the original on 25 May 2026.
