= Fabiana Cristine da Silva =

Brazilian runner (born 1978)

Personal information
- Born: September 3, 1978 (age 47) Recife, Brazil
- Height: 1.66 m (5 ft 5 1/2 in)

Sport
- Sport: Long-distance running
- Event(s): 1500 metres, 5000 metres, 10,000 metres, half marathon
Medal record
Women's athletics
Representing Brazil
South American Championships
| Gold medal – first place | 2011 Buenos Aires | 5000 m |
| Silver medal – second place | 1999 Bogotá | 1500 m |
South American Cross Country Championships
| Gold medal – first place | 2000 Cartagena | Short race |

Fabiana Cristine da Silva (born 3 September 1978) is a Brazilian female former distance runner who competed in the 800 metres up to the half marathon. She competed six times at the IAAF World Cross Country Championships (five times as a junior) and also represented her country at the 2010 IAAF World Half Marathon Championships and the 2011 Pan American Games.

She was the gold medallist in the 5000 m at the 2011 South American Championships in Athletics and set a championship record of 15:39.67 minutes in the process. She had won the 1500 m silver earlier in her career at the 1999 South American Championships in Athletics. She was twice a 5000 m silver medallist at the Ibero-American Championships in Athletics (2008, 2012). She was also the regional champion at the 2000 South American Cross Country Championships, winning the women's short race. She had been junior champion at that event in 1994 and 1997.

Born in Recife, she set Brazilian junior records in the 1500 metres, 3000 metres and 5000 metres in the late 1990s. She competed for the BM&F Bovespa team. Silva was among the most promising South American junior athletes of her generation. She won a 1500/3000 m double at both the 1996 South American Junior Championships in Athletics and 1997 Pan American Junior Athletics Championships. She won three distance running medals from 800 m to 3000 m at the 1994 South American Youth Championships in Athletics.

== Personal bests ==
- 800 metres – 2:04.24 min (2000)
- 1500 metres – 4:12.67 min (2000)
- 3000 metres – 9:10.97 min (2006)
- 5000 metres – 15:39.67 min (2011)
- 10,000 metres – 33:26.33 min (2008)
- 10K run – 33:25 min (2002)
- Half marathon – 75:10 min (2010)

== International competitions ==
| Year | Competition | Venue | Position | Event | Notes |
|---|---|---|---|---|---|
| 1992 | South American Youth Championships | Santiago, Chile | 8th | 1500 m | 4:55.90 |
| 1992 | South American Youth Championships | Santiago, Chile | 2nd | 3000 m | 9:56.88 |
| 1992 | South American Junior Championships | Lima, Peru | 3rd | 3000 m | 10:17.9 |
| 1992 | South American Junior Championships | Lima, Peru | 3rd | 10,000 m | 38:09.3 |
| 1993 | South American Cross Country Championships | Cali, Colombia | 2nd | Junior race | 14:48 |
| 1993 | South American Cross Country Championships | Cali, Colombia | 2nd | Junior team | 18 pts |
| 1993 | World Cross Country Championships | Amorebieta, Spain | 85th | Junior race | 16:16 |
| 1993 | World Cross Country Championships | Amorebieta, Spain | 19th | Junior team | 419 pts |
| 1994 | South American Cross Country Championships | Manaus, Brazil | 1st | Junior race | 14:03 |
| 1994 | South American Cross Country Championships | Manaus, Brazil | 2nd | Junior team | 14 pts |
| 1994 | World Cross Country Championships | Budapest, Hungary | 93rd | Junior race | 16:15 |
| 1994 | World Cross Country Championships | Budapest, Hungary | 23rd | Junior team | 496 pts |
| 1994 | South American Youth Championships | Cochabamba, Bolivia | 1st | 800 m | 2:14.30 |
| 1994 | South American Youth Championships | Cochabamba, Bolivia | 3rd | 1500 m | 4:53.49 |
| 1994 | South American Youth Championships | Cochabamba, Bolivia | 3rd | 3000 m | 10:46.4 |
| 1994 | South American Junior Championships | Santa Fe, Argentina | 2nd | 3000 m | 9:44.90 |
| 1994 | South American Junior Championships | Santa Fe, Argentina | 4th | 10,000 m | 37:01.50 |
| 1995 | South American Cross Country Championships | Cali, Colombia | 3rd | Junior race | 14:00 |
| 1995 | South American Cross Country Championships | Cali, Colombia | 1st | Junior team | 12 pts |
| 1995 | World Cross Country Championships | Durham, United Kingdom | 65th | Junior race | 15:54 |
| 1995 | World Cross Country Championships | Durham, United Kingdom | 15th | Junior team | 373 pts |
| 1995 | South American Junior Championships | Santiago, Chile | 3rd | 1500 m | 4:39.4 |
| 1995 | South American Junior Championships | Santiago, Chile | 3rd | 3000 m | 10:14.99 |
| 1996 | South American Cross Country Championships | Asunción, Paraguay | 2nd | Junior race | 14:33 |
| 1996 | South American Cross Country Championships | Asunción, Paraguay | 1st | Junior team | 11 pts |
| 1996 | World Cross Country Championships | Stellenbosch, South Africa | 46th | Junior race | 14:57 |
| 1996 | World Cross Country Championships | Stellenbosch, South Africa | 17th | Junior team | 335 pts |
| 1996 | South American Junior Championships | Bucaramanga, Colombia | 1st | 1500 m | 4:28.6 |
| 1996 | South American Junior Championships | Bucaramanga, Colombia | 1st | 3000 m | 10:11.9 |
| 1996 | World Junior Championships | Sydney, Australia | 12th (h) | 5000 m | 17:52.10 |
| 1997 | South American Cross Country Championships | Comodoro Rivadavia, Argentina | 1st | Junior race | 14:26 |
| 1997 | South American Cross Country Championships | Comodoro Rivadavia, Argentina | 1st | Junior team | 11 pts |
| 1997 | World Cross Country Championships | Turin, Italy | 25th | Junior race | 16:05 |
| 1997 | World Cross Country Championships | Turin, Italy | 18th | Junior team | 363 pts |
| 1997 | Pan American Junior Championships | Havana, Cuba | 1st | 1500 m | 4:16.07 |
| 1997 | Pan American Junior Championships | Havana, Cuba | 1st | 3000 m | 9:42.05 |
| 1998 | South American Cross Country Championships | Artur Nogueira, Brazil | 4th | Senior race | 30:02 |
| 1998 | South American Cross Country Championships | Artur Nogueira, Brazil | 1st | Senior team | 11 pts |
| 1999 | South American Championships | Bogotá, Colombia | 2nd | 1500 m | 4:37.68 |
| 1999 | South American Championships | Bogotá, Colombia | 5th | 5000 m | 17:34.15 |
| 2000 | South American Cross Country Championships | Cartagena, Colombia | 1st | Short race | 13:13 |
| 2000 | South American Cross Country Championships | Cartagena, Colombia | 1st | Short race team | 11 pts |
| 2000 | World Cross Country Championships | Vilamoura, Portugal | 52nd | Short race | 13:49 |
| 2000 | World Cross Country Championships | Vilamoura, Portugal | 17th | Team | 361 pts |
| 2006 | South American Championships | Tunja, Colombia | 4th | 5000 m | 17:44.97 |
| 2008 | Ibero-American Championships | Iquique, Chile | 2nd | 5000 m | 16:05.45 |
| 2009 | Lusophony Games | Lisbon, Portugal | 3rd | 5000 m | 16:21.79 |
| 2010 | World Half Marathon Championships | Nanning, China | 30th | Half marathon | 1:15:10 |
| 2010 | World Half Marathon Championships | Nanning, China | 5th | Team | 3:44:05 |
| 2011 | South American Championships | Buenos Aires, Argentina | 1st | 5000 m | 15:39.67 CR |
| 2011 | Pan American Games | Guadalajara, Mexico | 4th | 1500 m | 4:28.33 |
| 2012 | Ibero-American Championships | Barquisimeto, Venezuela | 2nd | 5000 m | 16:12.20 |
| 2014 | Ibero-American Championships | São Paulo, Brazil | 6th | 1500 m | 4:22.05 |

== National titles ==
- Brazilian Athletics Championships
  - 1500 metres: 1997, 2000, 2001, 2002
  - 5000 metres: 1997, 1999, 2000, 2001, 2002, 2004, 2005
