= William Roldán =

Colombian long-distance runner

Personal information
- Full name: William Roldán Mora
- Nationality: Colombian
- Born: 23 May 1973 (age 53)
- Height: 1.83 m (6 ft 0 in)

Sport
- Sport: Long-distance running
- Event: 5000 metres
Medal record
Men's athletics
Representing Colombia
South American U20 Championships
Gold medal – first place	1990 Bogota	5000 m
Silver medal – second place	1990 Bogota	1500 m
Gold medal – first place	1991 Asunción	5000 m
South American Cross Country Championships
Gold medal – first place	1991 Ambato	U20 race
Silver medal – second place	1992 São Paulo	U20 race
Silver medal – second place	1996 Asunción	Senior team
Bronze medal – third place	2000 Cartagena	Senior team
Ibero-American Championships
Gold medal – first place	1996 Medellín	5000 m

William Roldán Mora (born 23 May 1973) is a Colombian long-distance runner. He competed in the men's 5000 metres at the 1996 Summer Olympics.

As a teenager, Roldán won the South American Cross Country Championships U20 race. He represented Colombia at the 1991 Saint Silvester Road Race in Sao Paulo, Brazil. Roldan's coach, Alvaro Mejia, had won the same race in 1966.
