= Athletics at the 1987 Pan American Games – Men's 5000 metres =

Men's 5000 metres at the Pan American Games

The men's 5000 metres event at the 1987 Pan American Games was held in Indianapolis, United States on 13 August.

== Results ==
| Rank | Name | Nationality | Time | Notes |
|---|---|---|---|---|
| 1st place, gold medalist(s) | Arturo Barrios | Mexico | 13:31.40 | GR |
| 2nd place, silver medalist(s) | Adauto Domingues | Brazil | 13:46.41 | |
| 3rd place, bronze medalist(s) | Omar Aguilar | Chile | 13:47.86 | |
| 4 | Carey Nelson | Canada | 13:53.61 | |
| 5 | Marcelo Cascabelo | Argentina | 13:56.91 | |
| 6 | Antonio Silio | Argentina | 14:13.44 | |
| 7 | Marcos Barreto | Mexico | 14:15.57 | |
| 8 | Carlos Quiñones | Puerto Rico | 14:16.13 | |
| 9 | Hugo Allan García | Guatemala | 14:37.62 | |
| 10 | Rob Lonergan | Canada | 14:40.17 | |
| 11 | Ricardo Vera | Uruguay | 14:48.97 | |
| | Terry Brahm | United States | ~~13:37.56~~ | DQ* |
| | Doug Padilla | United States | ~~14:47.13~~ | DQ* |
| | Mark Elliott | Jamaica | DNS | |
| | Victor Sánchez | Paraguay | DNS | |

*Terry Brahm originally finished second in 13:37.56 but was later disqualified for being helped by his lapped compatriot Doug Padilla (also disqualified).
