= 1991 South American Cross Country Championships =

- Organisers: CONSUDATLE
- Edition: 6th
- Date: February 2
- Host city: Ambato, Tungurahua, Ecuador
- Events: 6
- Distances: 12 km – Senior men 8 km – Junior men (U20); 5 km – Youth men (U17); 8 km – Senior women 5 km – Junior women (U20); 3 km – Youth women (U17)
- Participation: at least 2 nations

The 1991 South American Cross Country Championships took place on February 2, 1991. The races were held in Ambato, Ecuador. Competitions open for youth athletes (under 17) were held for the first time.

Medal winners, and medal winners for junior and youth competitions were published.

== Medallists ==
All results are marked "affected by altitude" (A), because Ambato is situated at an elevation of about 2,600 m above sea level.

Event	Gold		Silver		Bronze	
Individual
Senior men (12 km)	Jacinto Navarrete; Colombia	41:37 A	Roberto Punina; Ecuador	41:59 A	Néstor Quinapanta; Ecuador	43:13 A
Junior (U20) men (8 km)	William Roldán; Colombia	28:12 A	Carlos Collahuazo; Ecuador	28:38 A	Julio Pozo; Ecuador	29:12 A
Youth (U17) men (5 km)	Patricio Rosero; Ecuador	18:33 A	Pedro Yupa; Ecuador	18:52 A	Bolívar Ordoñez; Ecuador	19:00 A
Senior women (8 km)	Graciela Caizabamba; Ecuador	32:39 A	Soledad Villamarín; Ecuador	32:57 A	Sandra Ruales; Ecuador	33:11 A
Junior (U20) women (5 km)	Carmen Naranjo; Ecuador	20:00 A	Mónica Tapía; Ecuador	20:07 A	Miriam Achote; Ecuador	20:11 A
Youth (U17) women (3 km)	Tania Cevallos; Ecuador	11:27 A	Norma Torres; Ecuador	11:29 A	Yolanda Duchi; Ecuador	11:35 A

== Medal table (unofficial) ==
* Host nation (Ecuador)

Rank	Nation	Gold	Silver	Bronze	Total
1	Ecuador*	4	6	6	16
2	Colombia	2	0	0	2
Totals (2 entries)		6	6	6	18

== Participation ==
Athletes from at least 2 countries participated.

- Colombia (5)
- Ecuador ( at least 16)

== See also ==
- 1991 in athletics (track and field)
