= Erika Abril =

Colombian long-distance runner

Érika Abril
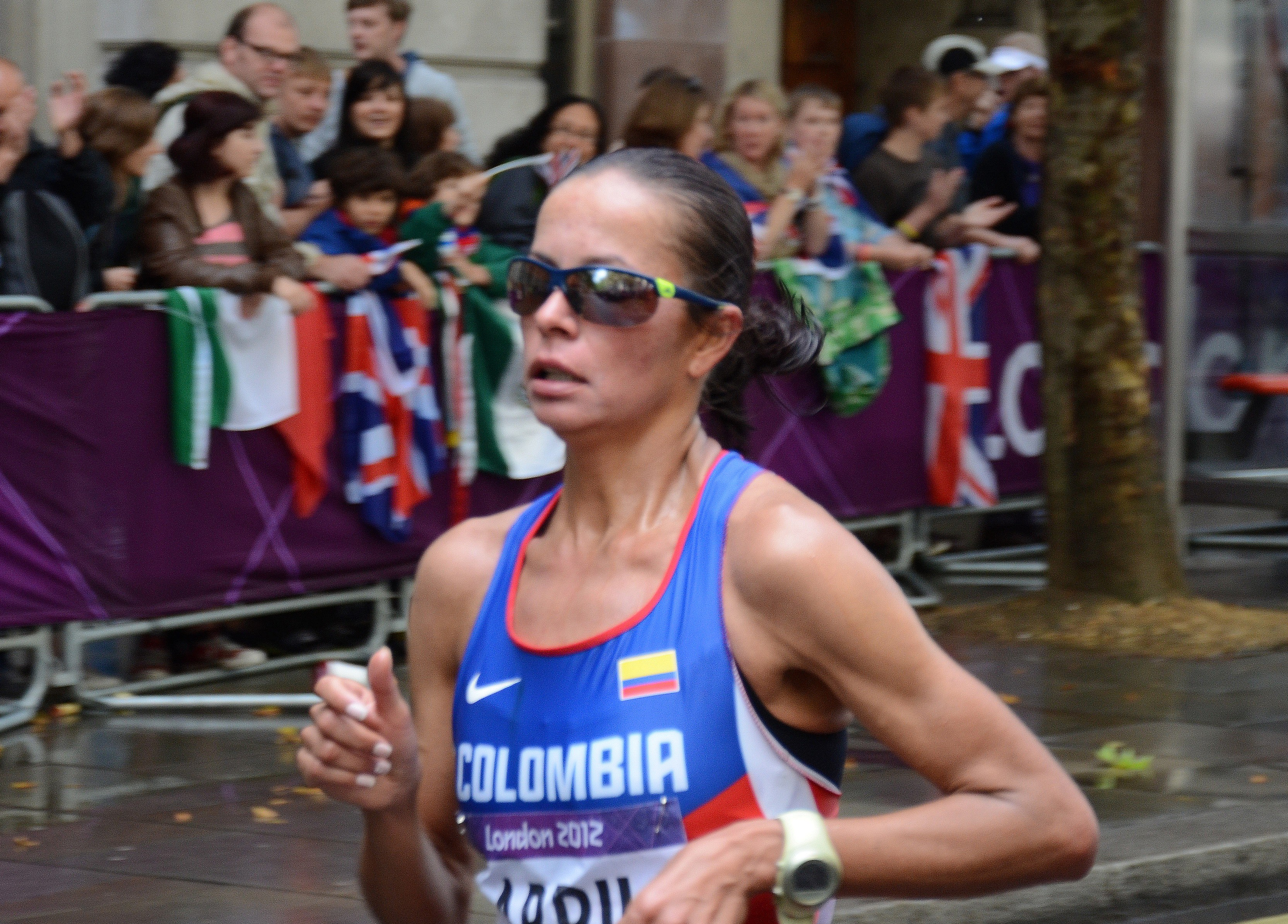
- Abril in the 2012 Summer Olympics marathon

Personal information
- Full name: Érika Abril Suárez
- Born: March 29, 1978 (age 48) San José de Pare, Boyacá, Colombia
- Height: 1.58 m (5 ft 2 in)
- Weight: 47 kg (104 lb)

Sport
- Country: Colombia
- Sport: Athletics
- Event: Distance running
- Updated on 12 June 2014

Erika Abril Suárez (born March 29, 1978) is a Colombian long-distance runner. She competed in the marathon at the 2012 Summer Olympics, placing 51st with a time of 2:33:33, a Colombian national record.

== Personal bests ==
- Half marathon: 1:13:14 hrs – São Paulo, 5 March 2012
- Marathon: 2:33:33 hrs – London, 5 August 2012

== Achievements ==
Year	Competition	Venue	Position	Event	Notes
Representing the Colombia
1993	South American Cross Country Championships (U17)	Cali, Colombia	3rd	4 km	15:44
1997	South American Cross Country Championships (U20)	Comodoro Rivadavia, Argentina	4th	4 km	15:08
1997	World Cross Country Championships (U20)	Turin, Italy	125th	4.689 km	17:55
2000	South American Cross Country Championships	Cartagena, Colombia	17th	4 km	14:58
2000	South American Cross Country Championships	Cartagena, Colombia	14th	8 km	31:24
2012	Olympic Games	London, United Kingdom	51st	Marathon	2:33:33
2013	World Championships	Moscow, Russia	39th	Marathon	2:55:13
2013	Bolivarian Games	Trujillo, Peru	3rd	Half marathon	1:16:54
