= Edy Punina =

Ecuadorian long-distance runner (born 1967)

Roberto Edy Punina Salvador
Personal information
- Born: July 2, 1967 (age 58)
Medal record
Men's athletics
Representing Ecuador
South American U20 Championships
Bronze medal – third place	1986 Quito	2000 m s'chase
Bolivarian Games
Silver medal – second place	1989 Maracaibo	3000 m s'chase
South American Games
Silver medal – second place	1990 Lima	3000 m s'chase
South American Cross Country Championships
Silver medal – second place	1990 Caracas	Senior race
Silver medal – second place	1991 Ambato	Senior race
Silver medal – second place	1993 Cali	Senior team
South American Championships
Bronze medal – third place	1991 Manaus	10,000 m

Roberto Edy Punina Salvador (born July 2, 1967) is a retired athlete from Ecuador, who competed in the long-distance running events during his career. He represented his native country at the 1992 Summer Olympics. Punina set his personal best in the men's 10,000 metres (30.00.4) in 1991.

Punina won his first international medal at the 1986 South American Junior Championships in Athletics, winning bronze in the 2000 m steeplechase. He would go on to win six other international medals at the Bolivarian Games, South American Games, South American Championships in Athletics, and South American Cross Country Championships.

Punina finished runner-up at the 1991 Girardot, Cundinamarca 14K race behind Julio Hernández in 44:28. Later that year, he finished 4th at the Carlos Mario Grisales el IV Cross Santiago de Cali, named after Carlos Grisales.
