= Paola Ramos =

Peruvian volleyball player

Paola Ramos Ydora

Personal information
- Full name: Paola Ramos Ydora
- Nationality: Peruvian
- Born: 20 April 1975 (age 51)
- Height: 1.73 m (5 ft 8 in)

Volleyball information
- Number: 6

Career
Years	Teams
1994–1995	Power Divino Maest

National team
1994–1996	Peru

Paola Ramos Ydora (born 20 April 1975), more commonly known as Paola Ramos, is a Peruvian former volleyball player. Ramos was part of the Peruvian women's national volleyball team at the 1996 Summer Olympics in Atlanta, where she finished in eleventh place.

Ramos also represented Peru at the 1994 FIVB World Championship in Brazil. On club level she played with Power Divino Maest.

== Clubs ==
- Power Divino Maest (1994–1995)
