= 2018 Pan American Cross Country Cup =

- Organisers: Association of Panamerican Athletics
- Edition: 3rd
- Date: February 17
- Host city: La Libertad, El Salvador
- Venue: Regimiento de Caballeria La Libertad
- Events: 4
- Distances: 10 km – Senior men 8 km – Junior men (U20); 8 km – Senior women 6 km – Junior women (U20)
- Participation: 20 countries nations
- Official website: https://atletismoelsalvador.org/event/esa-campeonato-panamericano-de-campo-traviesa/

The 2018 Pan American Cross Country Cup took place on February 17, 2018. in La Libertad, El Salvador.

The competition incorporated the 2018 South American Cross Country Championships.

== Medalists ==
Event	Gold	Silver	Bronze
Individual
Senior men (10 km)			
Junior (U20) men (8 km)			
Senior women (8 km)			
Junior (U20) women (6 km)			
Team
Senior men			
Junior (U20) men			
Senior women			
Junior (U20) women			

== Race results ==
=== Senior men's race (10 km) ===
Individual race
Rank	Athlete	Country	Time
1st place, gold medalist(s)			
2nd place, silver medalist(s)			
3rd place, bronze medalist(s)			
4			
5			
6			
7			
8			
9			
10			
11			
12			
13			
14			

Teams
Rank	Team	Points
1st place, gold medalist(s)		
2nd place, silver medalist(s)		
3rd place, bronze medalist(s)		
4		
5		
6		
7		

=== Junior (U20) men's race (8 km) ===
Individual race
Rank	Athlete	Country	Time
1st place, gold medalist(s)			
2nd place, silver medalist(s)			
3rd place, bronze medalist(s)			
4			
5			
6			
7			
8			
9			
10			
11			
12			
13			
14			

Teams
Rank	Team	Points
1st place, gold medalist(s)		
2nd place, silver medalist(s)		
3rd place, bronze medalist(s)		
4		
5		
6		
7		

=== Senior women's race (8 km) ===
Individual race
Rank	Athlete	Country	Time
1st place, gold medalist(s)			
2nd place, silver medalist(s)			
3rd place, bronze medalist(s)			
4			
5			
6			
7			
8			
9			
10			
11			
12			
13			
14			

Teams
Rank	Team	Points
1st place, gold medalist(s)		
2nd place, silver medalist(s)		
3rd place, bronze medalist(s)		
4		
5		
6		
7		

=== Junior (U20) women's race (6 km) ===
Individual race
Rank	Athlete	Country	Time
1st place, gold medalist(s)			
2nd place, silver medalist(s)			
3rd place, bronze medalist(s)			
4			
5			
6			
7			
8			
9			
10			
11			
12			
13			
14			

Teams
Rank	Team	Points
1st place, gold medalist(s)		
2nd place, silver medalist(s)		
3rd place, bronze medalist(s)		
4		
5		
6		
7		

== Medal table (unofficial) ==
* Host nation (El Salvador)

Rank	Nation	Gold	Silver	Bronze	Total
1	Brazil	0	0	0	0
1	Canada	0	0	0	0
1	Colombia	0	0	0	0
1	Ecuador	0	0	0	0
1	El Salvador*	0	0	0	0
1	Peru	0	0	0	0
1	United States	0	0	0	0
Totals (7 entries)		0	0	0	0

- Note: Totals include both individual and team medals, with medals in the team competition counting as one medal.

== Participation ==
According to an unofficial count, athletes from 20 countries participated.

- Argentina (0)
- Bermuda (0)
- Bolivia (0)
- Brazil (0)
- Canada (0)
- Chile (0)
- Colombia (0)
- Costa Rica (0)
- Cuba (0)
- Ecuador (0)
- El Salvador (0)
- Jamaica (0)
- Mexico (0)
- Paraguay (0)
- Peru (0)
- Puerto Rico (0)
- Trinidad and Tobago (0)
- Uruguay (0)
- United States (0)
- U.S. Virgin Islands (0)
- Venezuela (0)

== See also ==
- 2018 in athletics (track and field)
