= South American Cross Country Championships =

Annual continental cross country running competition

- Sport: Cross country running
- Founded: 1986
- Continent: South America (CONSUDATLE)

The South American Cross Country Championships is an annual continental cross country running competition for athletes from South America or, more specifically, member countries of CONSUDATLE. It was first held in 1986, making it the oldest of the continental cross country championships. The event is typically held in late February or early March.

The South American Championships in Athletics were the precursor to the competition in that cross country was featured on the main athletics programme between 1924 and 1949. After the introduction of an independent championships in 1986, multiple races were held: the initial competition schedule featured long races for senior men and women, and shorter races for junior men and women. This was expanded in 1991 with the addition of a youth competition for younger runners. Keeping in line with changes to the IAAF World Cross Country Championships, the South American championships also held senior short race competitions between 1998 and 2006, to complement the established long races. The short races were removed from the programme after their removal from the World Championships in 2006.

Brazil have been the most successful nation at the championships: they were undefeated in both of the long race team contests between 1993 and 2001.

== Editions ==
Edition	Year	Venue	City	Country	Date	No. of runners
1st	1986		San Carlos de Bariloche	Argentina		28
2nd	1987		Santiago	Chile		23
3rd	1988		Tandil	Argentina		23
4th	1989		Asunción	Paraguay		32
5th	1990		Caracas	Venezuela		26
6th	1991		Ambato	Ecuador		
7th	1992	Jóckey Club	São Paulo	Brazil		
8th	1993		Cali	Colombia		89
9th	1994		Manaus	Brazil		81 + 1 guest
10th	1995		Cali	Colombia		60
11th	1996	Club Mbiguá	Asunción	Paraguay		108
12th	1997	Santa Lucía Golf Club	Comodoro Rivadavia	Argentina		82 + 1 guest
13th	1998		Artur Nogueira	Brazil		117
14th	1999		Artur Nogueira	Brazil		89
15th	2000		Cartagena de Indias	Colombia		81 + 69 foreign guests + 45 locals
16th	2001		Rio de Janeiro	Brazil		88 + 114 local
17th	2002		Santa Cruz de la Sierra	Bolivia		72
18th	2003	Ñu Guasú Park	Asunción	Paraguay		95
19th	2004	Forte Marechal Hermes	Macaé	Brazil		89
20th	2005	Club de Golf del Uruguay	Montevideo	Uruguay		138
21st	2006	Naval Base	Mar del Plata	Argentina		142
22nd	2007	Centro de Treinamento da Marinha	Rio de Janeiro	Brazil		86 + 1 guest
23rd	2008	Ñu Guasú Park	Asunción	Paraguay		91
24th	2009	Parque del Stadio Italiano	Coronel	Chile		73
25th	2010	Campus La Salle	Guayaquil	Ecuador	27 February	82
26th	2011	Club Deportivo Sajonia	Asunción	Paraguay	20 February	97
27th	2012	Escuela de Equitación del Ejército	Lima	Peru	4 March	85
28th	2013	Ayuí Hotel Complex	Concordia, Entre Ríos	Argentina	24 February	91
29th	2014	Jardín Botánico y Zoológico	Asunción	Paraguay	23 February	158
30th	2015		Barranquilla	Colombia	22 February	
31st	2016		Caraballeda	Venezuela	4 March	
32nd	2017	Parque Padre Hurtado	Santiago	Chile	19 February	
33rd	2018		La Libertad	El Salvador	17 February	
34th	2019	Samanes	Guayas	Ecuador	23 February	
35th	2022		Serra	Brazil	27 March	
36th	2023		Bariloche	Argentina	22 January	

== Champions ==
=== Long course ===
Year	Men's senior race		Women's senior race	
Year	Individual	Team	Individual	Team
1986	Omar Aguilar (CHI)		Olga Caccaviello (ARG)	
1987	Omar Aguilar (CHI)		Mónica Regonessi (CHI)	
1988	Antonio Silio (ARG)		Stella Maris Selles (ARG)	
1989	Artur Castro (BRA)		Griselda González (ARG)	
1990	Gerardo de Assis (BRA)		Rita de Jesus (BRA)	
1991	Jacinto Navarrete (COL)		Graciela Caizabanda (ECU)	
1992	Valdenor dos Santos (BRA)		Carmem de Oliveira (BRA)	
1993	Valdenor dos Santos (BRA)	Brazil	Silvana Pereira (BRA)	Brazil
1994	Silvio Guerra (ECU)	Brazil	Carmem de Oliveira (BRA)	Brazil
1995	Vanderlei de Lima (BRA)	Brazil	Roseli Machado (BRA)	Brazil
1996	Herder Vásquez (COL)	Brazil	Stella Castro (COL)	Brazil
1997	Elenílson da Silva (BRA)	Brazil	Stella Castro (COL)	Brazil
1998	Sérgio Gonçalves da Silva (BRA)	Brazil	Rosângela Faría (BRA)	Brazil
1999	Sérgio Couto (BRA)	Brazil	Érika Olivera (CHI)	Brazil
2000	Daniel Ferreira (BRA)	Brazil	Bertha Sánchez (COL)	Brazil
2001	Adilson Ribeiro (BRA)	Brazil	Adriana de Souza (BRA)	Brazil
2002	Jonathan Monje (CHI)	Chile	Adriana de Souza (BRA)	Ecuador
2003	Javier Guarín (COL)	Chile	Susana Rebolledo (CHI)	Chile
2004	Byron Piedra (ECU)	Ecuador	Maria Lúcia Vieira (BRA)	Brazil
2005	William Naranjo (COL)	Ecuador	Lucélia Peres (BRA)	Brazil
2006	Javier Guarín (COL)	Brazil	Inés Melchor (PER)	Venezuela
2007	William Naranjo (COL)	Brazil	Ednalva Laureano da Silva (BRA)	Brazil
2008	Marílson Gomes dos Santos (BRA)	Brazil	Inés Melchor (PER)	Brazil
2009	Roberto Echeverría (CHI)	Brazil	Zenaide Vieira (BRA)	Brazil
2010	Miguel Almachi (ECU)	Brazil	Inés Melchor (PER)	Peru
2011	Solonei da Silva (BRA)	Brazil	Simone Alves da Silva (BRA)	Brazil
2012	Gilberto Lopes (BRA)	Brazil	Tatiele Carvalho (BRA)	Brazil
2013	Gilmar Silvestre Lopes (BRA)	Brazil	Cruz Nonata da Silva (BRA)	Brazil
2014	Wellington Bezerra da Silva (BRA)	Brazil	Sueli Pereira da Silva (BRA)	Brazil
2015	Gilberto Silvestre Lopes (BRA)	{{}}	Gladys Lucy Tejeda (PER)	{{}}
2016	Gilberto Silvestre Lopes (BRA)	{{}}	Luz Mery Rojas (PER)	{{}}
2017	René Champi (PER)	{{}}	Carmen Toaquiza (ECU)	{{}}
2018	Cristhian Pacheco (PER)	{{}}	Carmen Toaquiza (ECU)	{{}}
2019	José Luis Rojas (PER)	{{}}	Silvia Patricia Ortiz (ECU)	{{}}
2022	Wendell Geronimo Souza (BRA)	{{}}	Maria Lucineida da Silva (BRA)	{{}}
2023	Fabio Jesus Correia (BRA)	{{}}	Maria Lucineida da Silva (BRA)	{{}}

=== Short course ===
Year	Men's short race		Women's short race	
Year	Individual	Team	Individual	Team
1998	João Carlos Leite (BRA)	Brazil	Ana de Souza (BRA)	Brazil
1999	Valdenor dos Santos (BRA)	Brazil	Érika Olivera (CHI)	Chile
2000	Daniel Ferreira (BRA)	Brazil	Fabiana Cristine da Silva (BRA)	Brazil
2001	Oscar Cortínez (ARG)	Argentina	María Paredes (ECU)	Brazil
2002	Hudson de Souza (BRA)	Chile	Bertha Sánchez (COL)	Ecuador
2003	Clodoaldo da Silva (BRA)	Chile	Valeria Rodríguez (ARG)	Chile
2004	Juan Suárez (ARG)	Ecuador	Susana Rebolledo (CHI)	Argentina
2005	Israel dos Anjos (BRA)	Brazil	Susana Rebolledo (CHI)	Argentina
2006	Hudson de Souza (BRA)	Chile	Valeria Rodríguez (ARG)	Argentina
