= José Alirio Carrasco =

Colombian long-distance runner

Personal information
- Full name: José Alirio Carrasco Lemus
- Nationality: Colombian
- Born: 22 February 1976 (age 49) Bogotá, Colombia
- Height: 1.70 m (5 ft 7 in)
- Weight: 57 kg (126 lb)

Sport
- Sport: Long-distance running
- Event: Marathon

José Alirio Carrasco Lemus (born 22 February 1976) is a Colombian long-distance runner. He competed in the men's marathon at the 2000 Summer Olympics and the 2004 Summer Olympics.
