= María Elena Calle =

Ecuadorian marathon runner

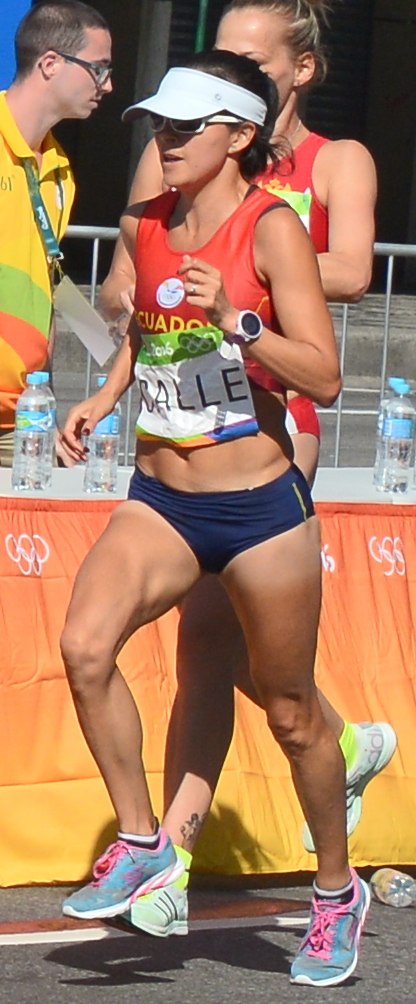
- Calle at the 2016 Olympics

Personal information
- Born: 25 July 1975 (age 50)
- Height: 162 cm (5 ft 4 in)
- Weight: 54 kg (119 lb)

Sport
- Sport: Track and field
- Event: Marathon
- Coached by: Julian Spooner; Ben Rosario

Achievements and titles
- Personal best: 2:42:19 (2016)

María Elena Calle (born 25 July 1975) is an Ecuadorian marathon runner. She placed 99th at the 2016 Olympics.

Calle took up running in 1984, but ran her first marathon only in 2011. She has a degree in occupational therapy from Virginia Commonwealth University where she competed for the VCU Rams track and field team. She is married to Brad Lowery and works as a therapist in the United States.
