= Julio Hernández =

Colombian long-distance runner

Personal information
- Full name: Julio César Hernández Jaraba
- Nationality: Colombian
- Born: 20 August 1957 (age 68)
- Height: 1.75 m (5 ft 9 in)
- Weight: 66 kg (146 lb)

Sport
- Sport: Long-distance running
- Event: Marathon

Julio César Hernández Jaraba (born 20 August 1957) is a Colombian long-distance runner. He competed in the men's marathon at the 1996 Summer Olympics.
