= Julio Suárez =

Guatemalan banker

Julio Roberto Suárez Guerra

President of the Bank of Guatemala
- In office 1 October 2014 – 30 September 2018
- Preceded by: Edgar Barquín
- Succeeded by: Sergio Francisco Recinos Rivera

Personal details
- Education: Universidad de San Carlos de Guatemala

Julio Roberto Suárez Guerra is a Guatemalan banker who served as the president of the Bank of Guatemala from 1 October 2014 to 30 September 2018. He spent the majority of his term detained, relating to a large-scale fraud case, of which he was cleared on appeal in July 2019.

== Career ==
Suárez obtained a degree from the Universidad de San Carlos de Guatemala. From 2002 to 2005 he worked for the Central American Bank for Economic Integration. Suárez also worked as the Guatemalan representative to the International Monetary Fund. Suárez served as Vice President of the Bank of Guatemala from 2006 until his appointment as President per 1 October 2014. He succeeded Edgar Barquín.

On 20 May 2015 Suárez was arrested together with fifteen others on accusations of fraud, illegal charging of commissions, illicit association and influence peddling. Suárez himself was accused of fraud. The accusations were linked to the awarding of a contract to the Empresa Farmaceútica Pisa de Guatemala with services to the Guatemalan Social Security Institute, in which the accused were suspected of receiving kickbacks. Suárez spent 3,5 years in detention before his trial commenced. On 26 September 2018 he, and eleven others, were convicted of fraud and sentenced to six years and 3 months imprisonment. On 5 July 2019 an appeal led to the clearing of the charges against Suárez.

Suárez's term in office as President of the Bank of Guatemala ended on 30 September 2018, he was succeeded by Sergio Francisco Recinos Rivera.
