= Omar Aguilar =

Chilean long-distance runner

Medal record

Athletics

Representing Chile

South American Games
Gold medal – first place	1986 Santiago	5,000 m
Silver medal – second place	1986 Santiago	10,000 m
Bronze medal – third place	1982 Santa Fe	10,000 m

Domingo Omar Aguilar Cardenas (born December 1, 1959) is a retired male long-distance runner from Chile, who represented his native country twice at the Summer Olympics: 1984 and 1988.

== Career ==
He was torch lighter for the 1986 South American Games at the Estadio Nacional in Santiago, Chile.

In addition to his successes on the track, he won the men's race at the first two editions of the South American Cross Country Championships.

== Achievements ==
Year	Competition	Venue	Position	Event	Notes
Representing Chile
1981	South American Championships	La Paz, Bolivia	7th	1500 m	4:22.2
1982	Southern Cross Games	Santa Fe, Argentina	4th	5000 m	14:24.7
1982	Southern Cross Games	Santa Fe, Argentina	3rd	10,000 m	29:55.6
1983	South American Championships	Santa Fe, Argentina	1st	5000 m	14:00.9
1983	South American Championships	Santa Fe, Argentina	1st	10,000 m	29:12.1
1984	Olympic Games	Los Angeles, United States	–	Marathon	DNF
1985	South American Championships	Santiago, Chile	1st	5000 m	13:53.69
1985	South American Championships	Santiago, Chile	1st	10,000 m	28:39.90
1986	South American Games	Santiago, Chile	1st	5,000 m	14:05.56
1986	South American Games	Santiago, Chile	2nd	10,000 m	29:20.92
1987	Pan American Games	Indianapolis, United States	3rd	5000 m	13:47.86
1987	South American Championships	São Paulo, Brazil	3rd	5000 m	14:05.50
1987	South American Championships	São Paulo, Brazil	3rd	10,000 m	29:30.01
1989	South American Championships	Medellín, Colombia	4th	1500 m	3:52.3
1989	South American Championships	Medellín, Colombia	6th	5000 m	14:24.86
