= Eladio Fernández =

Spanish footballer

Eladio Fernandez
Personal information
- Full name: Eladio Carlos Fernández Guillermo
- Date of birth: 25 April 1986 (age 40)
- Place of birth: Madrid, Spain
- Height: 1.89 m (6 ft 2 in)
- Position: Goalkeeper

Senior career*
Years	Team	Apps	(Gls)
2007–2008	Logroñés CF	2	(0)
2008–2009	Zaragoza B	10	(0)
2009–2011	Alcorcón	13	(0)
2011–2012	Badajoz	20	(0)
2012–2013	SS Reyes	12	(0)
2013	Glyfada	1	(0)
2013–2014	Colmenar Viejo	2	(0)
2016	Arandina	5	(0)
- * Club domestic league appearances and goals

Eladio Carlos Fernández Guillermo (born 25 April 1986), known as Eladio, is a Spanish former professional goalkeeper.

== Club career ==
Eladio started his senior career in the Spanish Segunda División B with Logroñés CF. He played also in the reserves team of Real Zaragoza, and with AD Alcorcón in the season of the stunning 4–0 defeat of giant Real Madrid in the 2009–10 King's Cup. Eladio would promote to the Spanish Segunda División with AD Alcorcón this year.

In 2011, he joined Badajoz, which he would soon leave due to the club's financial troubles. Thereafter, Eladio spent several months working with the AFE team under the supervision of José Francisco Molina and playing a number of friendly games in China, in which his remarkable role would take him to SS Reyes. After just one season, Eladio signed with the Glyfada F.C. in the Greek second division.
