= Griselda González =

Spanish long-distance runner (born 1965)

Personal information
- Full name: Griselda María de los Ángeles González Santillo
- Nationality: Argentine, Spanish
- Born: 4 December 1965 (age 60) Buenos Aires, Argentina

Sport
- Country: Argentina, Spain

Griselda María de los Ángeles González Santillo (born 4 December 1965) is a former long-distance runner. She twice won the Buenos Aires Marathon. Born in Argentina, she represented her country of birth twice (1992 and 1996) at the Summer Olympics, before switching nationality and competing for Spain.

González had success at the South American Cross Country Championships where she took silver in the 1987 and 1988 races before finally taking the gold in 1989.

== Achievements ==
Year	Competition	Venue	Position	Event	Notes
Representing Argentina
1988	Buenos Aires Marathon	Buenos Aires, Argentina	1st	Marathon	2:42:48
1990	Ibero-American Championships	Manaus, Brazil	5th	3000 m	9:29.55
1990	Ibero-American Championships	Manaus, Brazil	4th	10,000 m	35:38.99
1991	Pan American Games	Havana, Cuba	5th	10,000 m	35:33.45
1992	Ibero-American Championships	Seville, Spain	2nd	10,000 m	33:24.89
1993	South American Championships	Lima, Peru	2nd	5000 m	9:45.5
1996	Olympic Games	Atlanta, United States	19th	Marathon	2:35:12
1997	Buenos Aires Marathon	Buenos Aires, Argentina	1st	Marathon	2:37:04
Representing Spain
2000	Olympic Games	Sydney, Australia	33rd	Marathon	2:38:28
2001	Rotterdam Marathon	Rotterdam, Netherlands	6th	Marathon	2:31:05
2001	World Championships	Edmonton, Canada	29th	Marathon	2:37:52
