= Silvana Pereira =

Brazilian runner (born 1965)

Personal information
- Born: 5 May 1965 (age 61)

Sport
- Sport: Track and field
Medal record
Women's athletics
Representing Brazil
South American Championships
Silver medal – second place	1989 Medellín	1500 m
Ibero-American Championships
Gold medal – first place	1990 Manaus	3000 m
Gold medal – first place	1994 Mar de Plata	3000 m
Gold medal – first place	1994 Mar de Plata	10,000 m
Silver medal – second place	1990 Manaus	10,000 m

Silvana Pereira (born 5 May 1965) is a Brazilian former middle and long-distance runner. Her personal best of 1:11:15 hours for the half marathon is the Brazilian and South American record for the event. She was the 1500 m South American silver medallist in 1989 and was the 1993 South American champion in cross country. She had much success at the Ibero-American Championships in Athletics, winning three golds and a silver medal at the competition during her career.

In her earlier career, she was fourth in both the 1500 metres and 3000 metres at the 1981 South American Junior Championships in Athletics, then improved to win the 3000 m silver medal at the 1983 championships. Her first major senior medal came at the 1989 South American Championships in Athletics, where she was runner-up in the 1500 m race.

In 1990, she placed second in the long race at the South American Cross Country Championships. She was chosen to represent Brazil at the 1990 Ibero-American Championships in Athletics in Manaus. There she ran a championship record of 9:10.17 minutes to win the 3000 metres and finished second to Carmen Brunet over 10,000 metres. The year after she ran a South American record for the half marathon in Florianópolis, setting a time of 1:11:15 hours.

She won the South American cross country title in 1993 and came third in the long race at the following year's competition. The 1994 season marked the last major achievements of her career, as she completed a 5000/10,000 m double at the Brazilian National Championships, then a 3000/10,000 m double at the 1994 Ibero-American Championships in Athletics.
