= Iglandini González =

Colombian long-distance runner

Personal information
- Full name: Iglandini de Jesús González Pardo
- Born: 5 February 1965 (age 61)

Sport
- Country: Colombia
- Sport: Women's athletics

Achievements and titles
- Olympic finals: 1996 Summer Olympics; 2000 Summer Olympics
Medal record
Women's athletics
Representing Colombia
Bolivarian Games
Bronze medal – third place	1997 Arequipa	10000 m
Bronze medal – third place	2005 Armenia	Half marathon

Iglandini de Jesús González Pardo (born 5 February 1965) long-distance runner from Colombia, who twice represented her native country at the Summer Olympics in the women's marathon race (1996 and 2000). She set her personal best – and the Colombian national record (2:35:19) – in the classic distance on 3 March 1996 in Los Angeles, United States.

== Achievements ==
Year	Competition	Venue	Position	Event	Notes
Representing Colombia
1996	Olympic Games	Atlanta, United States	22nd	Marathon	2:35:45
1997	Bolivarian Games	Arequipa, Peru	3rd	10,000 m	36:33.14 A
1999	Pan American Games	Winnipeg, Canada	2nd	Marathon	2:40:06
2000	Olympic Games	Sydney, Australia	40th	Marathon	2:47:26
2003	Pan American Games	Santo Domingo, Dominican Republic	4th	Marathon	2:47:40
2005	Bolivarian Games	Armenia, Colombia	3rd	Half marathon	1:22:51 A
2006	Central American and Caribbean Games	Cartagena, Colombia	3rd	Marathon	2:54:05
