= Valdenor dos Santos =

Brazilian long-distance runner

Personal information
- Born: Valdenor Pereira dos Santos; 21 December 1969 (age 56) São Raimundo Nonato, Brazil

Sport
- Country: Brazil
- Sport: Athletics
- Event: Long-distance running
Medal record
Pan American Games
| Silver medal – second place | 1995 Mar del Plata | 10,000m |

Valdenor Pereira dos Santos (born 21 December 1969) is a Brazilian former long-distance runner.

Born in São Raimundo Nonato, dos Santos started running professionally at the age of 15. He featured in four editions of the World Championships during the 1990s but never in the Olympics, coming closest in 1996 when he seemed to be in the team for Atlanta, only for a change in the qualification rules to then rule him out.

An 11-time national champion in long-distance events, dos Santos completed the 5,000 & 10,000 metres double at the 1991 South American Championships. His successes in road race events include back to back wins at the Gasparilla Distance Classic in Tampa. He won a silver medal for Brazil in the 10,000 metres at the 1995 Pan American Games and also that year ran the Carlsbad 5000 race in 13:30 to set a South American record in the 5 km which still stands. He is a former South American record holder for the 15 km.
