= Antonio Silio =

Argentine long-distance runner

Personal information
- Born: 9 May 1966 (age 60) Nogoyá, Entre Ríos, Argentina
Medal record
Men's Athletics
Representing Argentina
World Half Marathon Championships
Silver medal – second place	1992 Tyneside	Half Marathon
Pan American Games
Bronze medal – third place	1991 Havana	5,000 m
South American Games
Bronze medal – third place	1986 Santiago	5,000 m

Antonio Fabián Silio Alaguire (born 9 May 1966) is a retired long-distance runner from Argentina. He competed in three editions of the World Championships in Athletics (1991 to 1995), racing in the 10,000 metres. His best result was 8th in 1993. He also finished in the top six of three World Half Marathon Championships (1992, 1993, 1998), finishing second in the inaugural World Half Marathon Championships in 1992.

He won the bronze medal in the men's 5000 metres at the 1991 Pan American Games in Havana, Cuba. He finished second in the 10000 metres at the 1994 World Cup, held at Crystal Palace, London, and won the 1995 edition of the Hamburg Marathon, clocking 2:09:57.

Prior to his career in track and road running, he competed in cross country and won medals at the South American Cross Country Championships. He won a silver in 1987, the gold in 1988 and a bronze in 1989.

== Personal bests ==
Distance	Time	Location	Date
3000 m	7:50.15	Jerez, Spain	3 September 1990
5000 m	13:19.64	Rome, Italy	17 July 1991
10,000 m	27:38.72	Brussels, Belgium	3 September 1993
10K run	27:52	Copenhagen, Denmark	19 August 1990
15K run	42:59	Uster, Switzerland	27 September 1998
Half marathon	1:00:45	Uster, Switzerland	27 September 1998
25K run	1:16:13	Ōtsu, Japan	3 March 1996
30K run	1:31:30	Ōtsu, Japan	3 March 1996
Marathon	2:09:57	Hamburg, Germany	30 April 1995

== International competitions ==
Year	Competition	Venue	Position	Event	Notes
Representing Argentina
1986	South American Games	Santiago, Chile	3rd	5000 m	14:23.43
1987	Pan American Games	Indianapolis, United States	6th	5000 m	14:13.44
1987	South American Championships	São Paulo, Brazil	6th	5000 m	14:36.0
1990	Ibero-American Championships	Manaus, Brazil	3rd	5000 m	13:59.18
1990	Ibero-American Championships	Manaus, Brazil	1st	10,000 m	29:27.61
1991	Pan American Games	Havana, Cuba	3rd	5000 m	14:02.72
1992	World Half Marathon Championships	Newcastle, United Kingdom	2nd	Half marathon	1:00:40
1992	Ibero-American Championships	Seville, Spain	4th	5000 m	14:00.97
1993	South American Championships	Lima, Peru	1st	10,000 m	28:37.2
1993	World Championships	Stuttgart, Germany	8th	10,000 m	28:36.88
1994	Ibero-American Championships	Mar del Plata, Argentina	7th	5000 m	14:19.68
1994	Ibero-American Championships	Mar del Plata, Argentina	—	10,000 m	DNF
1995	Pan American Games	Mar del Plata, Argentina	7th	10,000 m	29:44.61
1995	Hamburg Marathon	Hamburg, Germany	1st	Marathon	2:09:57
1996	Olympic Games	Atlanta, United States	—	Marathon	DNF
1999	Pan American Games	Winnipeg, Canada	–	10,000 m	DNF
