= Silvio Guerra =

Ecuadorian long-distance runner

Personal information
- Full name: Silvio Román Guerra Burbano
- Born: 18 September 1968 (age 58) San Gabriel, Carchi, Ecuador

Sport
- Country: Ecuador
- Sport: Men's Athletics

Achievements and titles
- Olympic finals: 1996 Summer Olympics; 2000 Summer Olympics; 2004 Summer Olympics
Medal record
Athletics
Representing Ecuador
South American Games
Gold medal – first place	1990 Lima	10,000 m
Silver medal – second place	1990 Lima	5,000 m
Bolivarian Games
Gold medal – first place	1993 Cochabamba	1,500 m
Gold medal – first place	1993 Cochabamba	5,000 m
Gold medal – first place	2001 Ambato	10,000 m
Silver medal – second place	1989 Maracaibo	Half marathon
Silver medal – second place	2005 Armenia	Half marathon
Bronze medal – third place	1993 Cochabamba	3,000 m steeplechase

Silvio Román Guerra Burbano (born 18 September 1968 in San Gabriel, Carchi) is an Ecuadorian runner.

== Career ==
A member of Concentración Deportiva de Pichincha he represented Ecuador at the 1996 Summer Olympics in Atlanta, United States, the 2000 Summer Olympics in Sydney, Australia and the 2004 Summer Olympics in Athens, Greece. He also qualified for the 2008 Summer Olympics in Beijing, China. He has won many tournaments. He has held the Ecuadorian marathon record since 1997, 2:09:49. This was achieved at the Chicago Marathon.

Guerra has won numerous medals at the South American Cross Country Championships: starting with a silver medal in 1993, gold the following year, a second silver in 2000, and finally a bronze medal in 2005.

== Achievements ==
Year	Competition	Venue	Position	Event	Notes
Representing Ecuador
1989	Bolivarian Games	Maracaibo, Venezuela	2nd	Half marathon	1:08:25
1989	South American Championships	Medellín, Colombia	3rd	5000 m	14:11.20
1990	South American Games	Lima, Peru	2nd	5,000 m	14:10.8
1990	South American Games	Lima, Peru	1st	10,000 m	29:59.7
1993	Bolivarian Games	Cochabamba, Bolivia	1st	1,500 m	3:57.01 A
1993	Bolivarian Games	Cochabamba, Bolivia	1st	5,000 m	14:31.00 A
1993	Bolivarian Games	Cochabamba, Bolivia	3rd	3,000 m steeplechase	9:29.65 A
1994	Ibero-American Championships	Mar del Plata, Argentina	4th	5000m	13:54.10
1994	Ibero-American Championships	Mar del Plata, Argentina	4th	10,000m	28:40.16
1997	Chicago Marathon	Chicago, United States	8th	Marathon	2:09:49
2000	Olympic Games	Sydney, Australia	14th	Marathon	2:16:27
2001	Boston Marathon	Boston, United States	2nd	Marathon	2:10:07
2001	Bolivarian Games	Ambato, Ecuador	1st	10,000 m	30:28.58 A
2004	Olympic Games	Athens, Greece	61st	Marathon	2:25:29
2005	Bolivarian Games	Armenia, Colombia	2nd	Half marathon	1:07:31 A
