= 2014 London Marathon =

34th annual marathon race in London

34th London Marathon
- Event logo
- Venue: London, England
- Date: 13 April 2014

Champions
- Men: Wilson Kipsang Kiprotich (2:04:29)
- Women: Edna Kiplagat (2:20:19)
- Wheelchair men: Marcel Hug (1:32:41)
- Wheelchair women: Tatyana McFadden (1:45:12)

The 2014 London Marathon was the 34th running of the annual marathon race in London, England, which took place on Sunday, 13 April. The men's elite race was won by Kenyan Wilson Kipsang Kiprotich and the women's race was won by Kenyan Edna Kiplagat. The men's wheelchair race was won by Switzerland's Marcel Hug and the women's wheelchair race was won by American Tatyana McFadden. Kipsang and McFadden set course records.

Around 169,682 people applied to enter the race: 49,872 had their applications accepted and 36,337 started the race. A total of 35,817 runners, 22,571 men and 13,246 women, finished the race.

In the under-17 Mini Marathon, the 3-mile able-bodied and wheelchair events were won by Zak Miller (14:27), Lydia Turner (16:05), Nathan Maguire (12:24) and Lauren Knowles (14:23).

== Race description ==
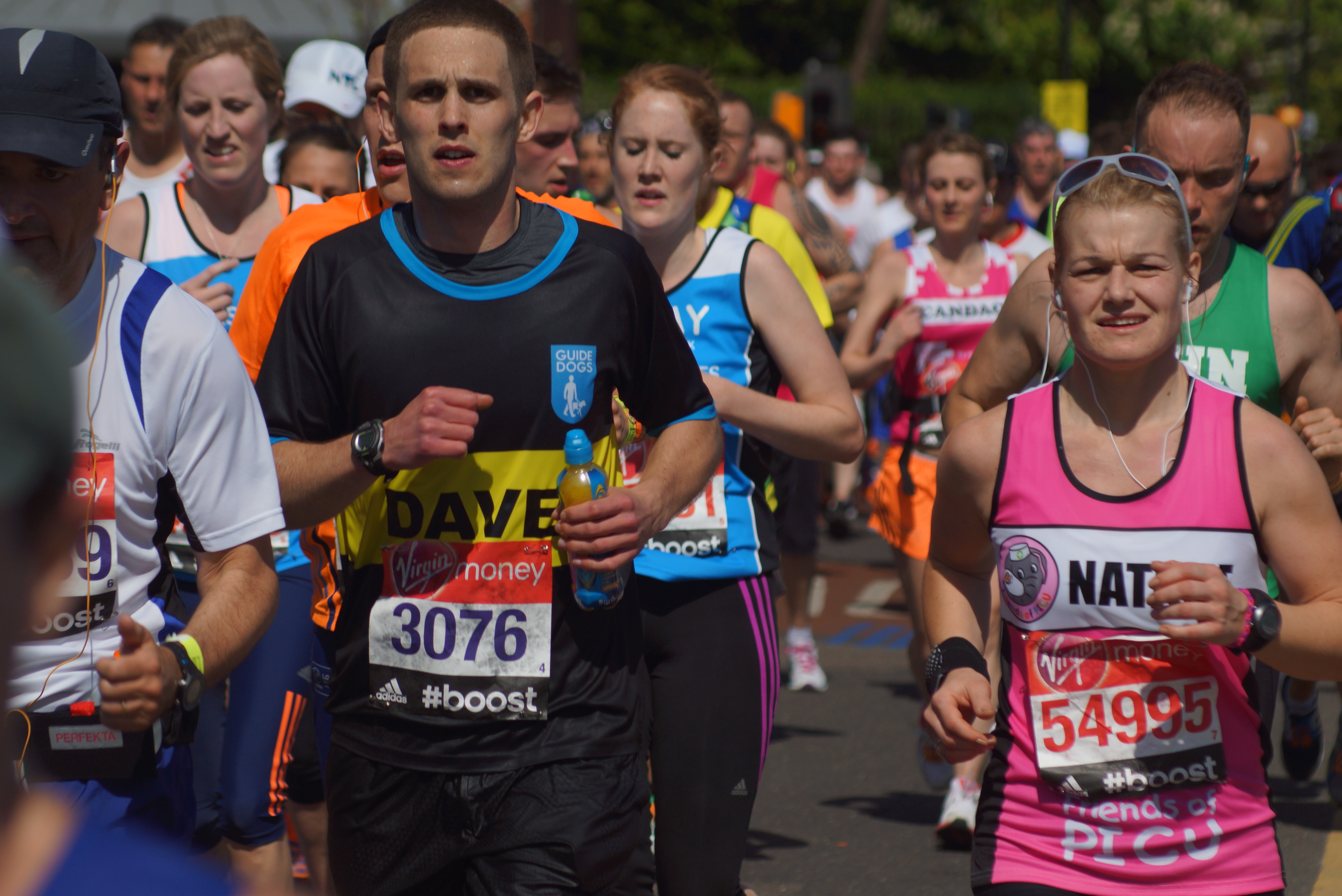
Charity-supporting non-elite participants in the race running along Westferry Road on the Isle of Dogs

The 2014 London Marathon was held on 13 April 2014. One of the largest crowds in London Marathon history, with spectators standing 10 to 15 people deep, turned out to cheer on the competitors in warm weather. The race began in Greenwich in South East London, passing by many of London's most famous landmarks, before finishing on The Mall.

=== Men's race ===
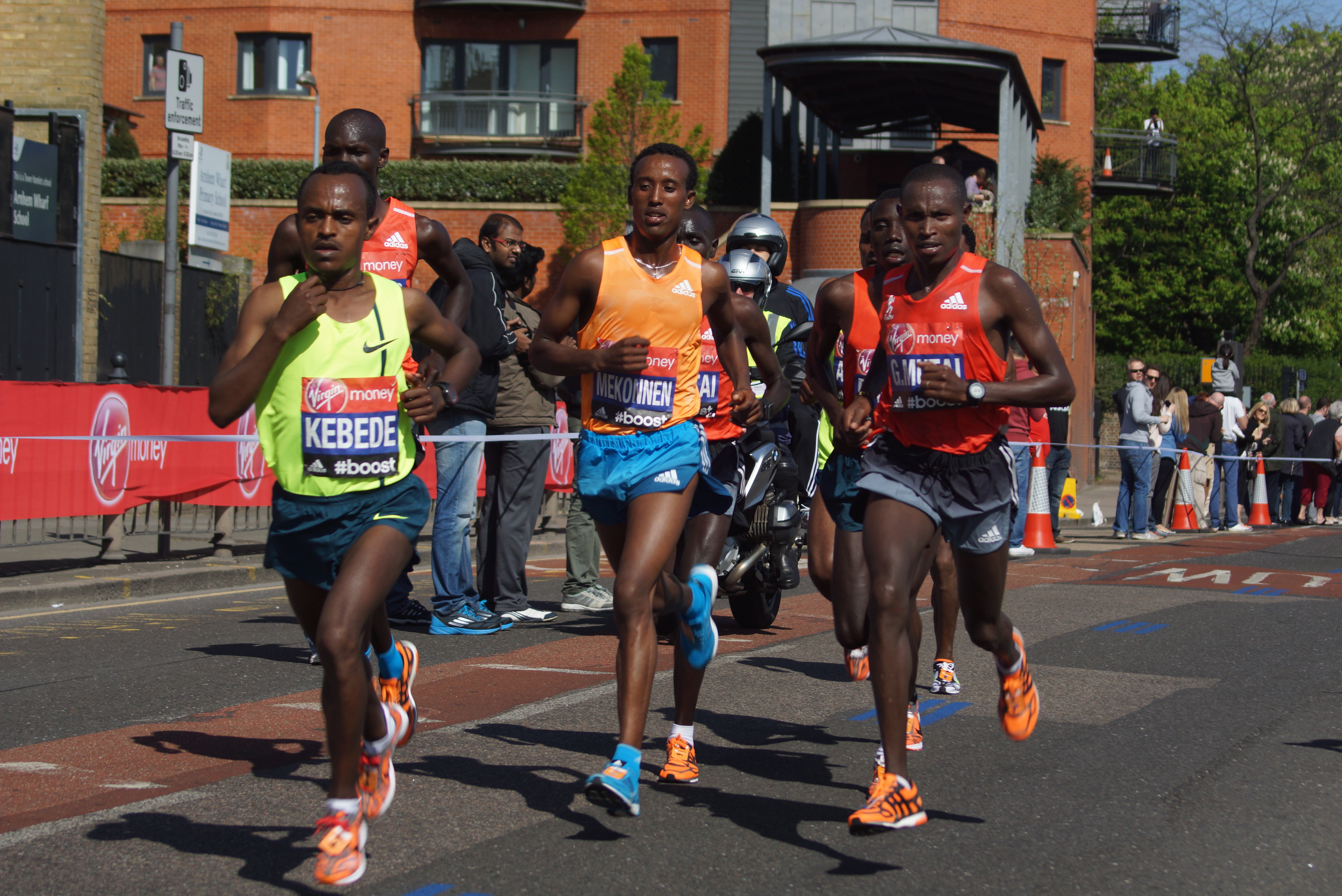
Leading elite men

The men's elite race featured a particularly strong field, including marathon world-record holder Wilson Kipsang, reigning Olympic and world marathon champion Stephen Kiprotich, 2013 London Marathon champion Tsegaye Kebede, and London course-record holder Emmanuel Kipchirchir Mutai. Other notable competitors included Geoffrey Mutai, who unofficially ran the fastest marathon ever; Ayele Abshero, who has the fastest marathon debut; Xiamen and Dublin marathon champion Feyisa Lelisa; Paris Marathon champion Stanley Biwott; two-time New York Marathon champion Marilson dos Santos, and 2011 world 10,000 metres champion Ibrahim Jeilan. British Olympic 10,000 metres Gold medallist Mo Farah, who ran half the marathon in 2013, drew significant interest in his home country and internationally. It was the first-ever marathon for Farah, often hailed as one of the greatest distance track runners in history.

Entering the final mile, two Kenyans led the race: 2012 London Marathon champion Wilson Kipsang and Stanley Biwott. Kipsang pulled away over the last mile, to win the race in 2 hours 4 minutes 29 seconds. Biwott finished second in a personal best 2:04:55. Ethiopians Kebede and Abshero followed, finishing the race in tandem, 2 minutes off the winning time and placing third and fourth respectively. Tsegaye Mekonnen, Geoffrey Mutai, Emmanuel Mutai, Farah and Lilesa formed the chasing pack, finishing 5th to 9th respectively, 4 minutes off the winning time. American Ryan Vail rounded out the top 10 runners, coming in at 02:10:57.

Wilson Kipsang's winning time was a course record and the 16th-fastest marathon in history.

=== Women's race ===
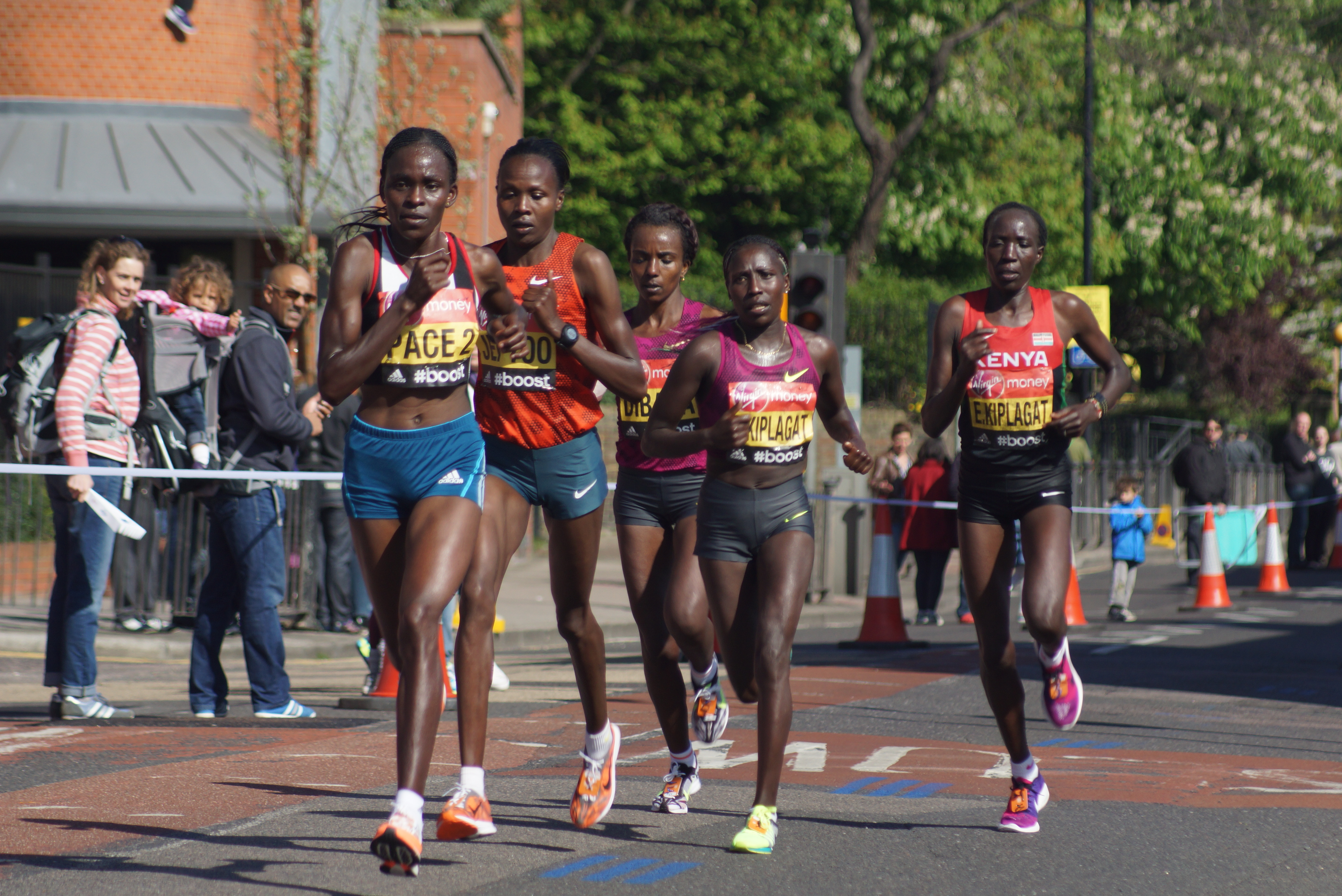
Leading elite women following a pacemaker

The women's race came down to a sprint finish between two Kenyans, Edna Kiplagat and Florence Kiplagat. Edna Kiplagat won the battle of the two unrelated women and finished in a time of 2:20:21, five minutes slower than the course record set by Paula Radcliffe in 2005. Florence Kiplagat finished second, three seconds back. Tirunesh Dibaba of Ethiopia finished third in her marathon debut after winning gold medals in the 10,000 metres during the previous two Olympic games.

=== Wheelchair races ===
American Tatyana McFadden won the women's wheelchair marathon race for the second consecutive year, re-breaking the course record she established in 2013. It was her first marathon of the year after taking a short sabbatical from the sport to compete in the sit-ski cross-country during the 2014 Winter Paralympics, where she won Silver.

In the men's wheelchair race, a week after winning the Paris Marathon, Marcel Hug beat his long-time rival David Wier in a sprint finish to take his first London title, having finished second in 2010, 2012 and 2013.

=== Non-elite race ===
The non-elite marathon had 30,825 registered entrants including celebrities and Members of Parliament. One man died in hospital after collapsing after the finish line. Millions of pounds were raised for charity by the run's participants.

Robert Berry, a runner from Newbury, Berkshire, collapsed at the finish line and the 42-year-old was pronounced dead after being transferred to St. Mary's Hospital. He was raising money for The National Osteoporosis Society as his mother had the condition. He had reported difficulty breathing before starting. Berry was the twelfth runner to die at the London Marathon in its 34-year history. The previous was 30-year-old Claire Squires in 2012. Tributes flooded in and donations were made to Berry's JustGiving page.

== Results ==
=== Men ===
| Position | Athlete | Nationality | Time |
|---|---|---|---|
| 1st place, gold medalist(s) | Wilson Kipsang Kiprotich | Kenya | 2:04:29 |
| 2nd place, silver medalist(s) | Stanley Biwott | Kenya | 2:04:55 |
| 3rd place, bronze medalist(s) | Tsegaye Kebede | Ethiopia | 2:06:30 |
| 4 | Ayele Abshero | Ethiopia | 2:06:31 |
| 5 | Tsegaye Mekonnen | Ethiopia | 2:08:06 |
| 6 | Geoffrey Mutai | Kenya | 2:08:18 |
| 7 | Emmanuel Kipchirchir Mutai | Kenya | 2:08:19 |
| 8 | Mo Farah | United Kingdom | 2:08:21 |
| 9 | Feyisa Lilesa | Ethiopia | 2:08:26 |
| 10 | Ryan Vail | United States | 2:10:57 |
| 11 | Chris Thompson | United Kingdom | 2:11:19 |
| 12 | Stephen Kiprotich | Uganda | 2:11:37 |
| 13 | Reid Coolsaet | Canada | 2:13:40 |
| 14 | Pedro Nimo | Spain | 2:14:15 |
| 15 | Steve Way | United Kingdom | 2:16:27 |
| 16 | John Gilbert | United Kingdom | 2:16:46 |
| 17 | Ben Livesey | United Kingdom | 2:17:44 |
| 18 | Samuel Tsegay | Eritrea | 2:19:10 |
| 19 | Scott Overall | United Kingdom | 2:19:55 |
| 20 | Jon Pepper | United Kingdom | 2:19:59 |
| — | Fernando Cabada | United States | DNF |
| — | Marílson Gomes dos Santos | Brazil | DNF |
| — | Amanuel Mesel | Eritrea | DNF |
| — | Paulo Roberto Paula | Brazil | DNF |
| — | Ibrahim Jeilan | Ethiopia | DNF |
| — | Cyprian Kimurgor Kotut | Kenya | DNF |
| — | Linus Maiyo | Kenya | DNF |
| — | Milton Rotich Kiplagat | Kenya | DNF |
| — | Richard Sigei | Kenya | DNF |
| — | Edwin Kiptoo | Kenya | DNF |
| — | Haile Gebrselassie | Ethiopia | DNF |

=== Women ===
| Position | Athlete | Nationality | Time |
|---|---|---|---|
| 1st place, gold medalist(s) | Edna Kiplagat | Kenya | 2:20:21 |
| 2nd place, silver medalist(s) | Florence Kiplagat | Kenya | 2:20:24 |
| 3rd place, bronze medalist(s) | Tirunesh Dibaba | Ethiopia | 2:20:35 |
| 4 | Feyse Tadese | Ethiopia | 2:21:42 |
| 5 | Aberu Kebede | Ethiopia | 2:23:21 |
| 6 | Jéssica Augusto | Portugal | 2:24:25 |
| 7 | Ana Dulce Félix | Portugal | 2:26:46 |
| 8 | Tiki Gelana | Ethiopia | 2:26:58 |
| 9 | Lyudmyla Kovalenko | Ukraine | 2:31:31 |
| 10 | Yuko Shimizu | Japan | 2:32:00 |
| 11 | Diane Nukuri | Burundi | 2:33:01 |
| 12 | Nicola Duncan† | Ireland | 2:33:28 |
| 13 | Amy Whitehead | United Kingdom | 2:34:20 |
| 14 | Emma Stepto | United Kingdom | 2:36:05 |
| 15 | Julie Briscoe† | United Kingdom | 2:39:43 |
| 16 | Sara Bird† | United Kingdom | 2:39:55 |
| 17 | Hayley Munn† | United Kingdom | 2:40:35 |
| 18 | Shona Fletcher† | United Kingdom | 2:44:59 |
| 19 | Claire Grima† | United Kingdom | 2:45:51 |
| 20 | Mamie Konneh-Lahun† | Sierra Leone | 2:46:20 |
| — | Tetyana Hamera-Shmyrko† | Ukraine | DQ (2:25:30) |

- Note: † = ran in the non-elite section of the race

=== Wheelchair men ===
| Position | Athlete | Nationality | Time |
|---|---|---|---|
| 1st place, gold medalist(s) | Marcel Hug | Switzerland | 1:32:41 |
| 2nd place, silver medalist(s) | David Weir | United Kingdom | 1:32:42 |
| 3rd place, bronze medalist(s) | Ernst van Dyk | South Africa | 1:32:42 |
| 4 | Kota Hokinoue | Japan | 1:32:43 |
| 5 | Pierre Fairbank | France | 1:35:05 |
| 6 | Jordi Jiménez | Spain | 1:35:05 |
| 7 | Heinz Frei | Switzerland | 1:35:05 |
| 8 | Richard Colman | Australia | 1:35:05 |
| 9 | Roger Puigbò | Spain | 1:35:05 |
| 10 | Josh George | United States | 1:35:08 |
| 11 | James Senbeta | United States | 1:36:45 |
| 12 | Hiroyuki Yamamoto | Japan | 1:36:45 |
| 13 | Rafael Botello | Spain | 1:36:45 |
| 14 | Denis Lemeunier | France | 1:38:01 |
| 15 | Krige Schabort | United States | 1:38:01 |
| 16 | Tomasz Hamerlak | Poland | 1:38:50 |
| 17 | Michel Filteau | Canada | 1:39:17 |
| 18 | Tobias Lotscher | Switzerland | 1:39:41 |
| 19 | Simon Lawson | United Kingdom | 1:39:42 |
| 20 | Josh Cassidy | Canada | 1:41:58 |

=== Wheelchair women ===
| Position | Athlete | Nationality | Time |
|---|---|---|---|
| 1st place, gold medalist(s) | Tatyana McFadden | United States | 1:45:12 |
| 2nd place, silver medalist(s) | Tatyana McFadden | United States | 1:45:12 |
| 3rd place, bronze medalist(s) | Wakako Tsuchida | Japan | 1:46:45 |
| 4 | Susannah Scaroni | United States | 1:51:01 |
| 5 | Christie Dawes | Australia | 1:51:01 |
| 6 | Shelly Woods | United Kingdom | 1:54:52 |
| 7 | Diane Roy | Canada | 1:54:54 |
| 8 | Shirley Reilly | United States | 1:59:57 |
| 9 | Jade Jones | United Kingdom | 1:59:59 |
| 10 | Sarah Piercy | United Kingdom | 2:27:28 |
| 11 | Martyna Snopek | United Kingdom | 2:43:01 |
