= 2012 London Marathon =

32nd annual marathon race in London

32nd London Marathon
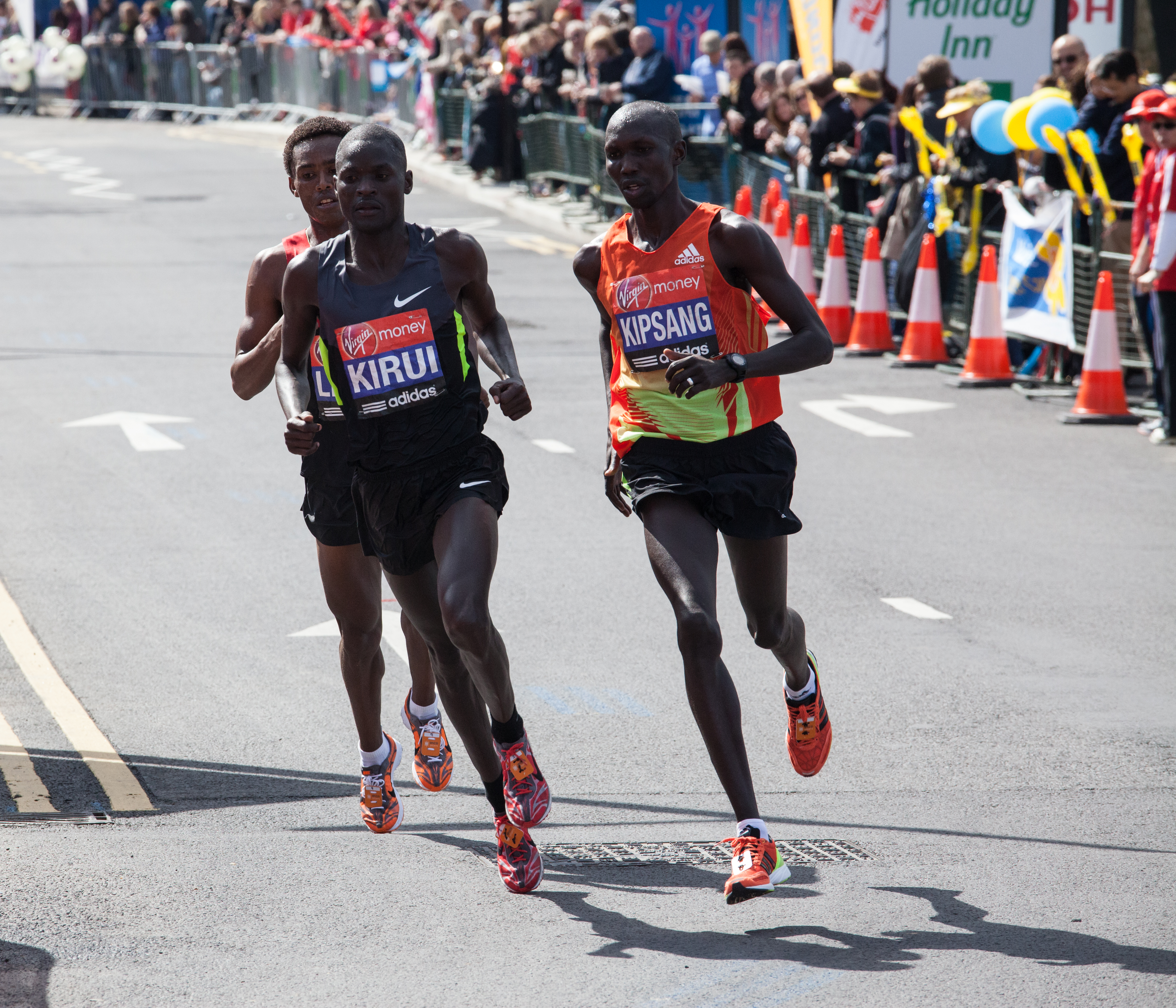
- Abel Kirui and Wilson Kipsang Kiprotich leading the men's race
- Venue: London, England, United Kingdom
- Dates: 22 April 2012

Champions
- Men: Wilson Kipsang Kiprotich (2:04:44)
- Women: Mary Jepkosgei Keitany (2:18:37)
- Wheelchair men: David Weir (1:32:26)
- Wheelchair women: Shelly Woods (1:49:10)

The 2012 London Marathon was the 32nd running of the annual marathon race in London, England, which took place on Sunday, 22 April. Both of the elite races were won by Kenyan athletes, and Ethiopia's Tsegaye Kebede was the only non-Kenyan to reach the podium in either race. Mary Jepkosgei Keitany won the women's elite race for the second year running with a Kenyan record time of 2:18:37 hours. Wilson Kipsang Kiprotich was the men's race winner with a time of 2:04:44 – four seconds off Emmanuel Kipchirchir Mutai's course record set at the 2011 London Marathon.

Around 170,150 people applied to enter the race: 50,200 had their applications accepted and 37,227 started the race. A total of 36,699, 23,634 men and 13,065 women, finished the race.

The top British finishers, Lee Merrien (17th) and Claire Hallissey (11th), earned the opportunity to compete for Great Britain at the 2012 Summer Olympics. The wheelchair races were won by two British athletes: David Weir took the men's title while Shelly Woods was the women's winner.

A fun runner, Claire Squires, died after collapsing in the final mile of the race. In response to publicity of her death, the general public made donations to her fund raising page at the Justgiving website. Over 80,000 separate donations were made, raising a total of over £1 million for Samaritans.

A mini marathon was held for under-17 athletes over the last three miles of the course. Michael Callegari (14:54) and Jessica Judd (her fourth straight title in 16:04) won the able-bodied races while Sheikh Sheikh (12:30) and Jade Jones (12:59) won the wheelchair races.

== Results ==
=== Elite men ===
Position	Athlete	Nationality	Time
1st place, gold medalist(s)	Wilson Kipsang Kiprotich	Kenya	2:04:44
2nd place, silver medalist(s)	Martin Lel	Kenya	2:06:51
3rd place, bronze medalist(s)	Tsegaye Kebede	Ethiopia	2:06:52
4	Jaouad Gharib	Morocco	2:07:44
5	Abel Kirui	Kenya	2:07:56
6	Emmanuel Kipchirchir Mutai	Kenya	2:08:01
7	Marílson Gomes dos Santos	Brazil	2:08:01
8	Samuel Tsegay	Eritrea	2:08:06
9	Feyisa Lilesa	Ethiopia	2:08:20
10	Bazu Worku	Ethiopia	2:10:14
11	Vincent Kipruto	Kenya	2:10:39
12	Zersenay Tadese	Eritrea	2:10:41
13	Abreham Cherkos	Ethiopia	2:12:46
14	Bekir Karayel	Turkey	2:13:21
15	Lee Merrien	United Kingdom	2:13:41
16	Solonei da Silva	Brazil	2:14:57
17	John Beattie	United Kingdom	2:16:38
18	Phil Anthony	United Kingdom	2:16:40
19	Martin Dent	Australia	2:17:32
20	Jesper Faurschou	Denmark	2:17:38
21	Anuradha Cooray	Sri Lanka	2:17:50
22	Andi Jones	United Kingdom	2:18:29
—	Abderrahime Bouramdane	Morocco	DQ
—	Adil Annani	Morocco	DQ
—	Shadrack Kosgei	Kenya	DNF
—	Philip Kiprono	Kenya	DNF
—	Scott Overall	United Kingdom	DNF
—	Yared Asmerom	Eritrea	DNF
—	Patrick Makau Musyoki	Kenya	DNF
—	Benedict Whitby	United Kingdom	DNF
—	Markos Geneti	Ethiopia	DNF

- Two Moroccan runners from the men's race were retrospectively disqualified for doping: Abderrahime Bouramdane, who originally finished 11th in a time of 2:10:13, and Adil Annani, who was originally fourth in 2:07:43.

=== Elite women ===
Position	Athlete	Nationality	Time
1st place, gold medalist(s)	Mary Jepkosgei Keitany	Kenya	2:18:37
2nd place, silver medalist(s)	Edna Kiplagat	Kenya	2:19:50
3rd place, bronze medalist(s)	Priscah Jeptoo	Kenya	2:20:14
4	Florence Kiplagat	Kenya	2:20:57
5	Lucy Wangui Kabuu	Kenya	2:23:12
6	Aberu Kebede	Ethiopia	2:24:04
7	Irina Mikitenko	Germany	2:24:53
8	Jéssica Augusto	Portugal	2:24:59
9	Atsede Baysa	Ethiopia	2:25:59
10	Jeļena Prokopčuka	Latvia	2:27:04
11	Claire Hallissey	United Kingdom	2:27:44
12	Koren Jelela	Ethiopia	2:28:05
13	Freya Murray	United Kingdom	2:28:10
14	Isabellah Andersson	Sweden	2:29:57
15	Louise Damen	United Kingdom	2:31:37
16	Constantina Diță	Romania	2:32:34
17	Irvette van Zyl	South Africa	2:33:41
18	Sonia Samuels	United Kingdom	2:33:41
19	Amy Whitehead	United Kingdom	2:33:44
20	Helen Decker	United Kingdom	2:34:11
21	Jessica Petersson	Denmark	2:34:56
22	Alyson Dixon	United Kingdom	2:35:46
23	Susan Partridge	United Kingdom	2:37:41
24	Liz Yelling	United Kingdom	2:40:08
25	Michelle Ross-Cope	United Kingdom	2:40:08
—	Yuliya Ruban	Ukraine	DQ
—	Mariya Konovalova	Russia	DQ
—	Ejegayehu Dibaba	Ethiopia	DNF
—	Nadia Ejjafini	Italy	DNF
—	Inga Abitova	Russia	DNF
—	Peninah Arusei	Kenya	DNF
—	Joyce Chepkirui	Kenya	DNF
—	René Kalmer	South Africa	DNF

- Two athletes were subsequently disqualified for doping: Russia's Mariya Konovalova, who was originally 15th with a time of 2:30:29, and Ukraine's Yuliya Ruban, who originally placed 21st with 2:34:47.

=== Wheelchair men ===
Position	Athlete	Nationality	Time
1st place, gold medalist(s)	David Weir	United Kingdom	1:32:26
2nd place, silver medalist(s)	Marcel Hug	Switzerland	1:32:27
3rd place, bronze medalist(s)	Krige Schabort	United States	1:32:28
4	Masazumi Soejima	Japan	1:32:29
5	Heinz Frei	Switzerland	1:32:30
6	Tomasz Hamerlak	Poland	1:32:31
7	Masayuki Higuchi	Japan	1:32:33
8	Hiroyuki Yamamoto	Japan	1:33:00
9	Josh Cassidy	Canada	1:33:54
10	Kota Hokinoue	Japan	1:36:00
11	Ernst van Dyk	South Africa	1:36:20
12	Roger Puigbò	Spain	1:36:56
13	Jordi Jiménez	Spain	1:36:56
14	Josh George	United States	1:39:56
15	Rafal Botello Jiminez	Spain	1:40:01
16	Adam Bleakney	United States	1:40:22
17	Choke Yasuoka	Japan	1:50:31
18	Laurens Sibaja-Molina	Costa Rica	1:54:34
19	Phil Hogg	United Kingdom	1:54:34
20	Mathew Clarke	United Kingdom	1:54:46

=== Wheelchair women ===
Position	Athlete	Nationality	Time
1st place, gold medalist(s)	Shelly Woods	United Kingdom	1:49:10
2nd place, silver medalist(s)	Wakako Tsuchida	Japan	1:53:04
3rd place, bronze medalist(s)	Diane Roy	Canada	1:53:05
4	Shirley Reilly	United States	1:54:39
5	Christina Schwab	United States	1:54:41
6	Amanda McGrory	United States	1:54:41
7	Sandra Graf	Switzerland	1:54:43
8	Tatyana McFadden	United States	2:05:38
9	Meggan Dawson-Farrell	United Kingdom	2:22:55
10	Sarah Piercy	United Kingdom	2:24:36
