= 2010 London Marathon =

30th annual marathon race in London

30th London Marathon
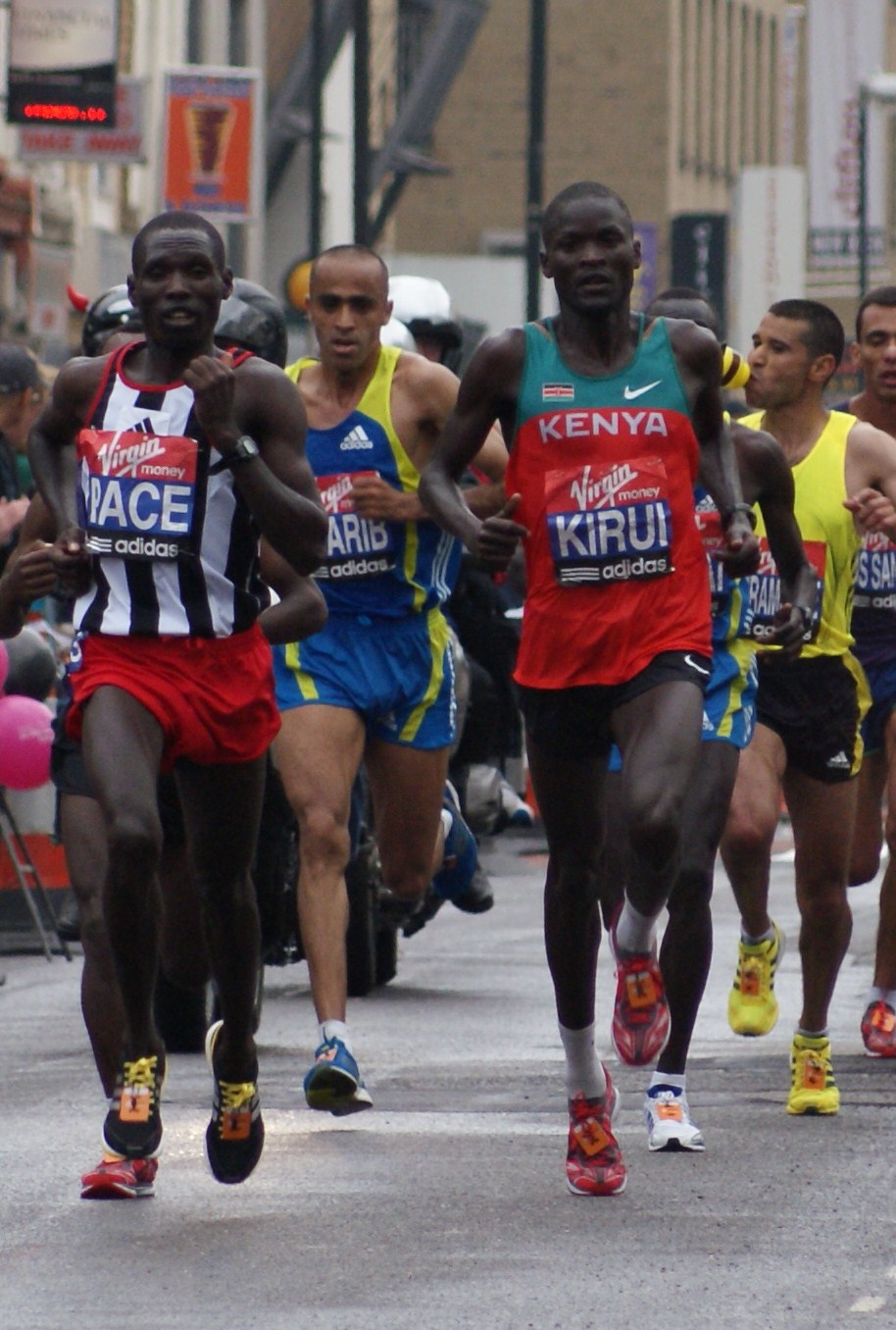
- The leaders of the elite men's race, including Kenya's Abel Kirui, who finished in fifth place
- Venue: London, United Kingdom
- Dates: 25 April 2010

Champions
- Men: Tsegaye Kebede (2:05:19)
- Women: Aselefech Mergia (2:22:38)
- Wheelchair men: Josh Cassidy (1:35:21)
- Wheelchair women: Wakako Tsuchida (1:52:33)

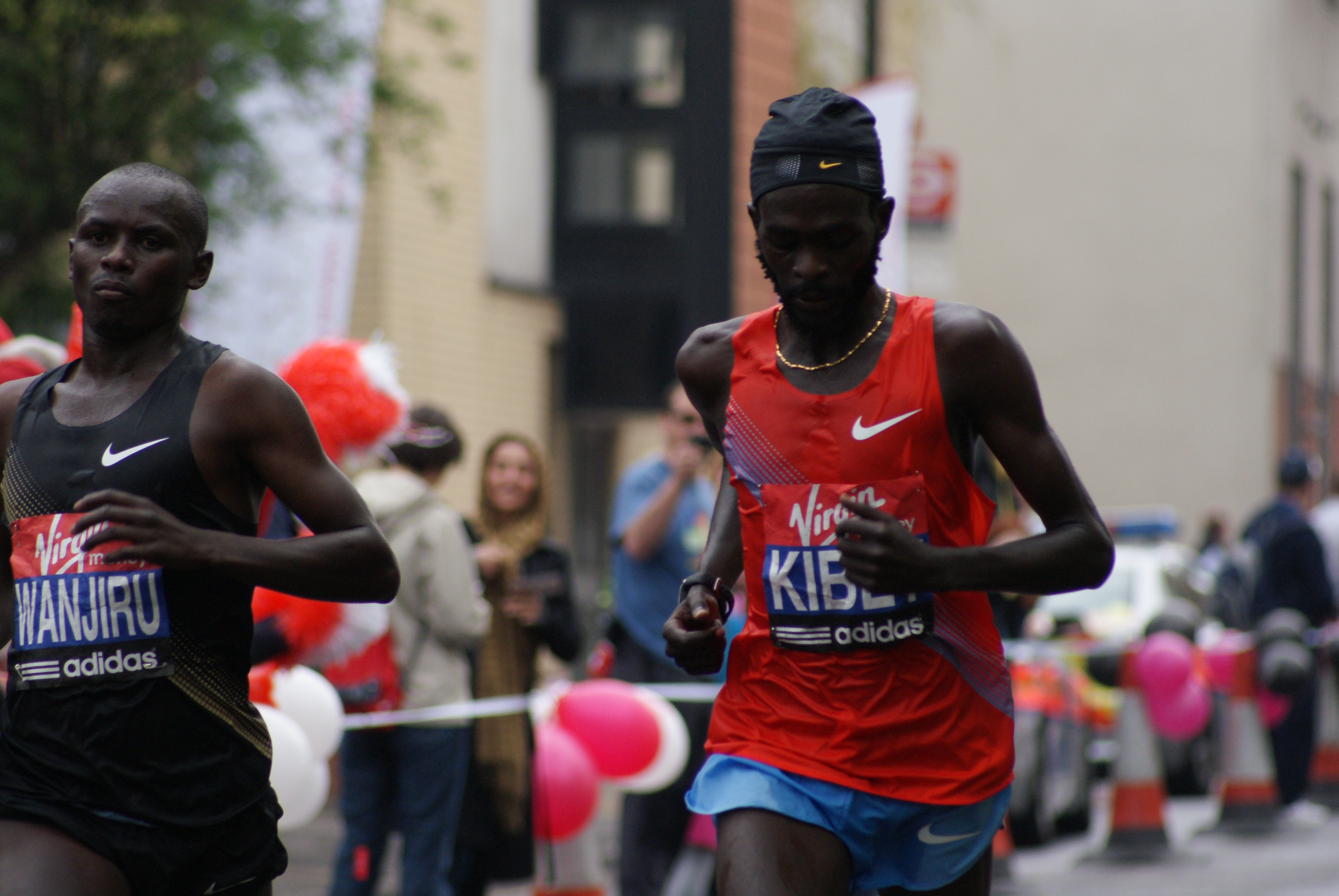
Kenya's Duncan Kibet and Samuel Wanjiru (who retired due to injury)

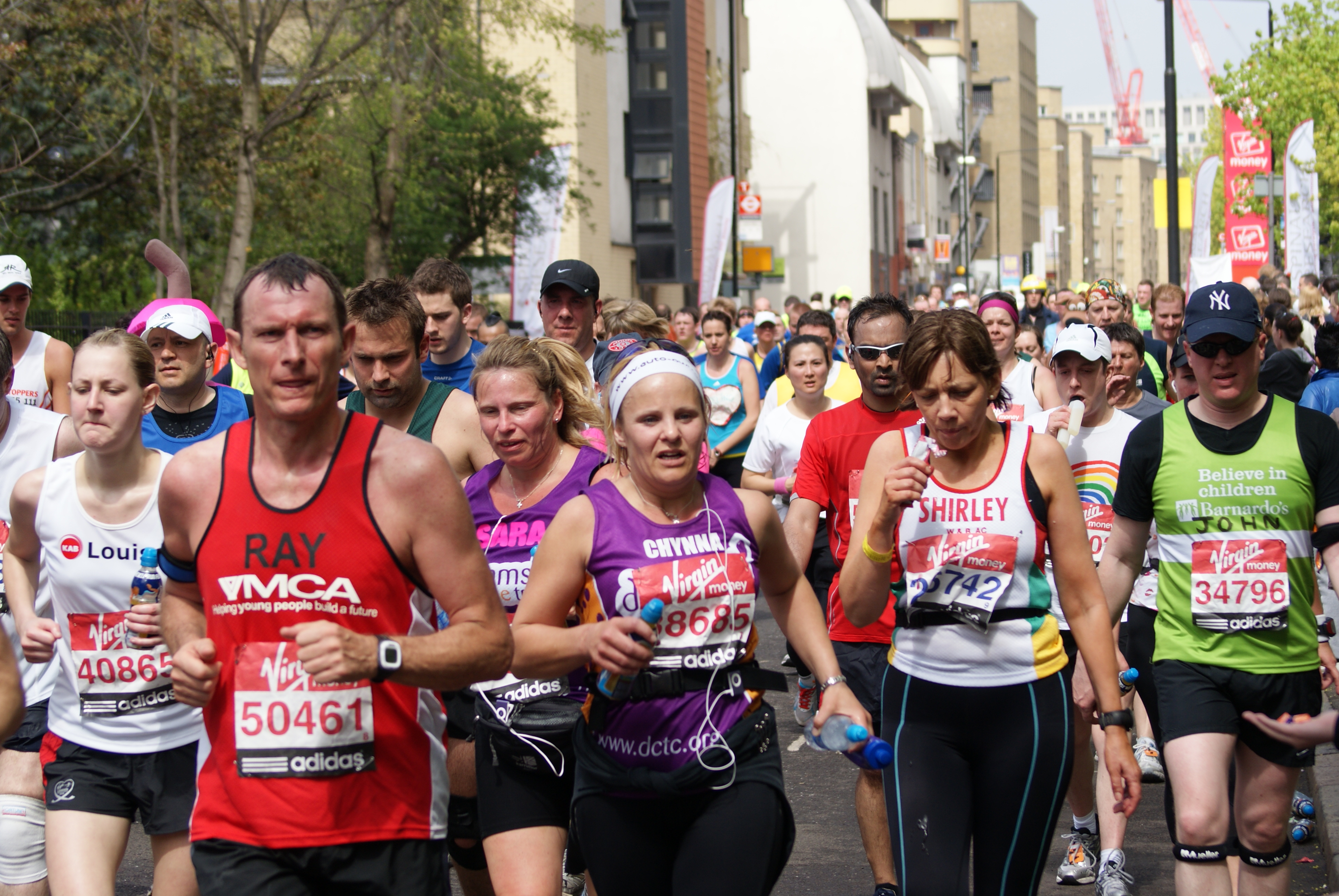
The marathon approaching the 25 km (16 mi) point

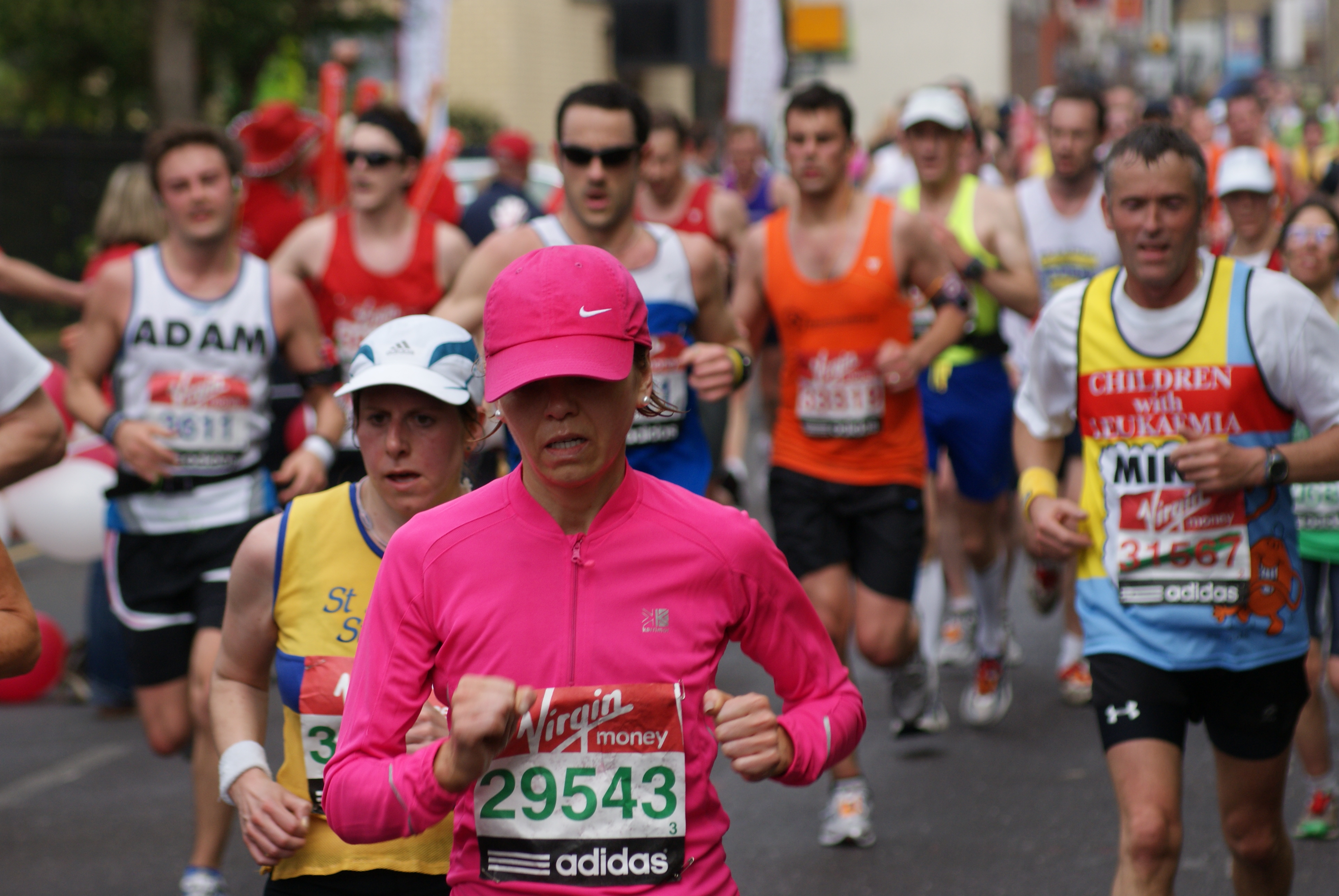
Approaching the 25 km (16 mi) point

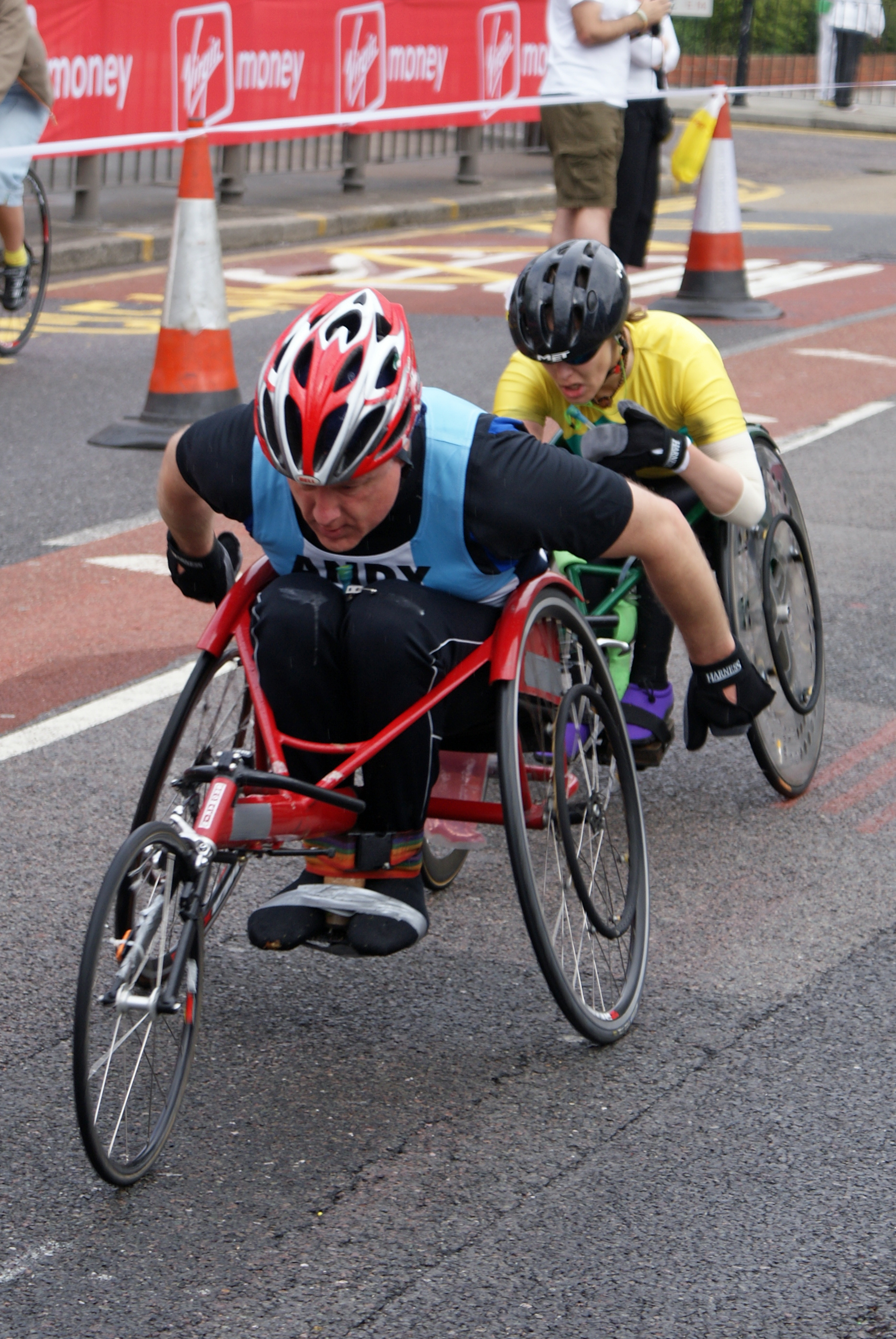
Two wheelchair racers in the marathon

The 2010 London Marathon was the 30th running of the annual marathon race in London, England, which took place on Sunday, 25 April. The elite men's race was won by Ethiopia's Tsegaye Kebede in a time of 2:05:19 hours and the elite women's race was won by Aselefech Mergia, also of Ethiopia, in 2:22:38.

In the wheelchair races, Canada's Josh Cassidy (1:35:21) and Japan's Wakako Tsuchida (1:52:33) won the men's and women's divisions, respectively.

Around 163,000 people applied to enter the race: 51,378 had their applications accepted and 36,956 started the race. A total of 36,553 runners, 24,423 men and 12,130 women, finished the race.

In the under-17 Mini Marathon, the 3-mile non-disabled and wheelchair events were won by Jack Gray (14:29), Jessica Judd (16:39), Daniel Lucker (12:36) and Hannah Cockroft (15:48).

== Summary ==
The men's event was won by Tsegaye Kebede of Ethiopia with a time of 2:05:19 and the women's event by Aselefech Mergia of Ethiopia with a time of 2:22:38, a position moved up after numerous disqualifications for doping. Kebede became the first non-Kenyan to win the men's event in seven years. The men's wheelchair event was won by Josh Cassidy of Canada with a time of 1:35:21 while Wakako Tsuchida of Japan won the women's wheelchair event.

The event saw 74 world record attempts, including one involving 34 runners bound together by bungee cord to form a "human caterpillar", among whom was Princess Beatrice of York, the fifth in line to the British throne, who became the first royal family member to participate in the marathon. Of the attempts, 41 were successful. The marathon was sponsored by Sir Richard Branson's Virgin Group, having signed a five-year contract, taking over from previous sponsors, Flora. Branson also ran the marathon for his first time.

Prior to the marathon, there had been concerns that the air-travel disruption caused by the 2010 eruptions of Eyjafjallajökull could disrupt the event, though many athletes from outside of the United Kingdom were brought in by an aircraft specially chartered from Spain.

Both of the 2009 winners, Samuel Wanjiru and Irina Mikitenko, were present to defend their titles. However, neither athlete managed to finish the race as they both stopped around the mid-way point.

== Results ==
=== Elite men ===
Position	Athlete	Nationality	Time
1st place, gold medalist(s)	Tsegaye Kebede	Ethiopia	2:05:19
2nd place, silver medalist(s)	Emmanuel Kipchirchir Mutai	Kenya	2:06:23
3rd place, bronze medalist(s)	Jaouad Gharib	Morocco	2:06:55
4	Abderrahime Bouramdane	Morocco	2:07:33
5	Abel Kirui	Kenya	2:08:04
6	Marílson Gomes dos Santos	Brazil	2:08:46
7	Zersenay Tadese	Eritrea	2:12:03
8	Andrew Lemoncello	Great Britain	2:13:40
9	Yonas Kifle	Eritrea	2:14:39
10	Andi Jones	Great Britain	2:16:38
11	Ben Moreau	Great Britain	2:16:46
12	Lee Merrien	Great Britain	2:16:48
13	Clint Perrett	New Zealand	2:18:15
14	Neil Renault	Great Britain	2:18:09
15	Dave Norman	Great Britain	2:19:05
16	Satoshi Irifune	Japan	2:19:25
17	Steve Way	Great Britain	2:19:38
18	Gareth Raven	Great Britain	2:19:55
19	Kristoffer Osterlund	Sweden	2:20:06
20	Pieter Vermeesh	Great Britain	2:20:16
—	John Kiprotich	Kenya	DNF
—	Moses Kimeli Arusei	Kenya	DNF
—	Michael Morgan	United States	DNF
—	Titus Masai	Kenya	DNF
—	Samuel Wanjiru	Kenya	DNF
—	Dan Robinson	Great Britain	DNF
—	Duncan Kibet	Kenya	DNF
—	Gedion Ngatuny	Kenya	DNF
—	John Kales	Kenya	DNF

=== Elite women ===
Position	Athlete	Nationality	Time
1st place, gold medalist(s)	Aselefech Mergia	Ethiopia	2:22:38
2nd place, silver medalist(s)	Bezunesh Bekele	Ethiopia	2:23:17
3rd place, bronze medalist(s)	Askale Tafa	Ethiopia	2:24:39
4	Yukiko Akaba	Japan	2:24:55
5	Bai Xue	China	2:25:18
6	Kim Smith	New Zealand	2:25:21
7	Mari Ozaki	Japan	2:25:43
8	Mara Yamauchi	Great Britain	2:26:16
9	Svetlana Zakharova	Russia	2:31:00
10	Atsede Habtamu	Ethiopia	2:31:41
11	Yoshimi Ozaki	Japan	2:32:26
12	Berhane Adere	Ethiopia	2:33:46
13	Tanith Maxwell	South Africa	2:34:24
14	Susan Partridge	Great Britain	2:35:57
15	Deena Kastor	United States	2:36:20
16	Helen Decker	Great Britain	2:36:56
17	Rebecca Robinson	Great Britain	2:37:14
18	Jo Wilkinson	Great Britain	2:37:44
19	Fiona Docherty	New Zealand	2:37:55
20	Holly Rush	Great Britain	2:37:56
21	Susan Harrison	Great Britain	2:38:53
22	Constantina Diță	Romania	2:41:12
23	Nicole Archer	Great Britain	2:42:22
24	Alyson Dixon	Great Britain	2:43:48
25	Jenny Bliss	Great Britain	2:49:10
DQ	Liliya Shobukhova	Russia	~~2:22:00~~
DQ	Inga Abitova	Russia	~~2:22:19~~
DQ	Mariya Konovalova	Russia	~~2:35:21~~
—	Anikó Kálovics	Hungary	DNF
—	Irina Mikitenko	Germany	DNF
—	Lyudmila Petrova	Russia	DNF

=== Wheelchair men ===
Position	Athlete	Nationality	Time
1	Josh Cassidy	Canada	1:35:21
2	Marcel Hug	Switzerland	1:36:07
3	David Weir	Great Britain	1:37:01
4	Kota Hokinoue	Japan	1:40:59
5	Kurt Fearnley	Australia	1:41:37
6	Ernst van Dyk	South Africa	1:44:11
7	Masazumi Soejima	Japan	1:44:35
8	Roger Puigbò	Spain	1:44:36
9	Josh George	United States	1:46:57
10	Mark Telford	Great Britain	1:48:43

=== Wheelchair women ===
Position	Athlete	Nationality	Time
1	Wakako Tsuchida	Japan	1:52:33
2	Sandra Graf	Switzerland	1:52:34
3	Amanda McGrory	United States	1:52:36
4	Nikki Emmerson	Great Britain	2:17:46
5	Sarah Piercy	Great Britain	2:33:50
6	Shelly Woods	Great Britain	2:45:40
—	Diane Roy	Canada	DNF
