= Adil Annani =

Moroccan long-distance runner

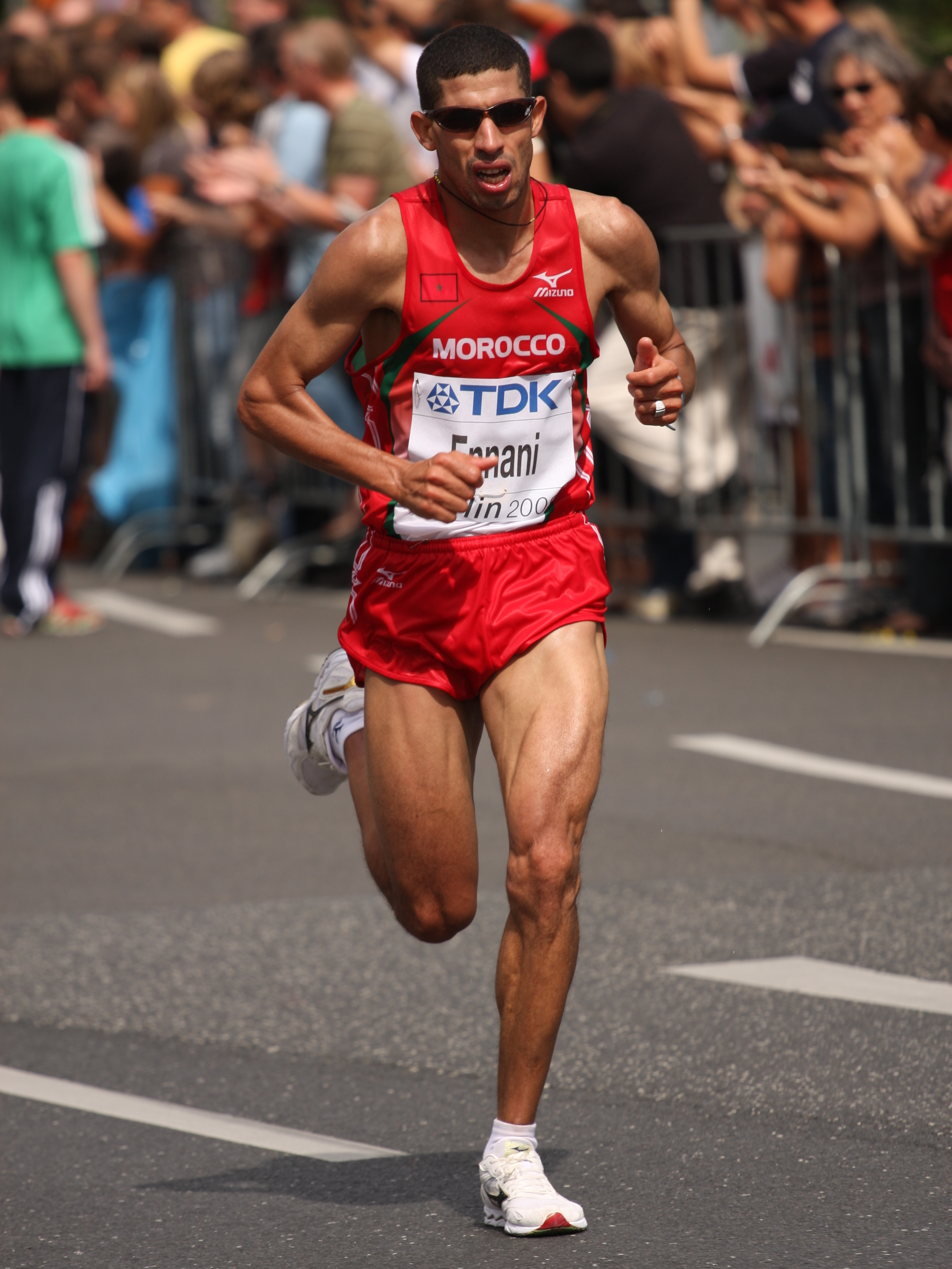

Personal information
- Born: 30 June 1980 (age 46)

Sport
- Country: Morocco
- Sport: Men's athletics
- Event: Marathon

Adil Annani, also known as Adil Ennani, (born 30 June 1980) is a male Moroccan long-distance runner. He has represented his country three times in the marathon at the World Championships in Athletics.

He competed in the marathon event at the 2015 World Championships in Athletics in Beijing, China, but did not finish.

On the professional running circuit, he has finished tenth at the 2014 Boston Marathon and fourth at the 2012 London Marathon, recording a personal best of 2:07:43 hours at the latter event. He was the 2009 winner of the Beppu-Ōita Marathon in Japan with a time of 2:10:15 hours.

He was banned from competition for four years for irregularities in his biological passport with the ban set to end on 20 June 2020. In addition, all his results from 4 November 2011 onwards were annulled.

== International competitions ==
| Year | Competition | Venue | Position | Event | Notes |
|---|---|---|---|---|---|
| 2009 | World Championships | Berlin, Germany | 7th | Marathon | 2:12:12 |
| 2011 | World Championships | Daegu, South Korea | — | Marathon | DNF |
| 2015 | World Championships | Beijing, China | — | Marathon | DNF |

== See also ==
- Morocco at the 2015 World Championships in Athletics
