= 2011 London Marathon =

31st annual marathon race in London

31st London Marathon
- Venue: London, England, United Kingdom
- Dates: 17 April 2011

Champions
- Men: Emmanuel Kipchirchir Mutai (2:04:44)
- Women: Mary Jepkosgei Keitany (2:19:19)
- Wheelchair men: David Weir (1:30:05)
- Wheelchair women: Amanda McGrory (1:46:31)

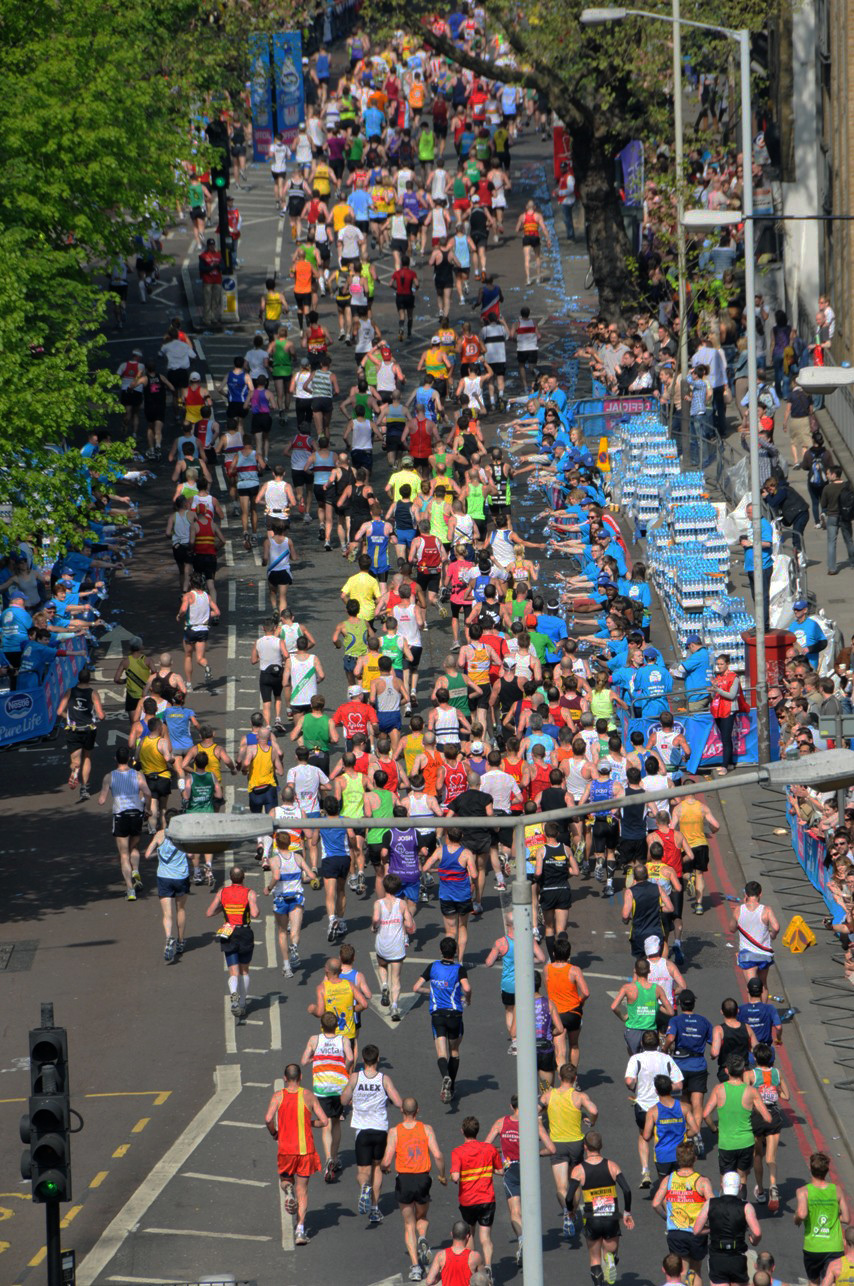
Runners in the mass race passing through Tooley Street

The 2011 London Marathon was the 31st running of the annual marathon race in London, England, which took place on Sunday, 17 April. The elite men's race was won by Kenya's Emmanuel Kipchirchir Mutai in a course record time of 2:04:40 hours and the elite women's race was won by Mary Jepkosgei Keitany, also of Kenya, in 2:19:19.

Mutai's win made him the fourth-fastest ever over the distance. Runner-up Martin Lel sprinted to the line to beat Patrick Makau Musyoki, completing a Kenyan sweep of the podium. Keitany became the fourth-fastest woman ever, while defending champion Liliya Shobukhova came second with a Russian record time (later annulled due to doping).

In the elite wheelchair racing marathon, Briton David Weir beat the defending champion Josh Cassidy to claim his fifth title at the event – the most in the history of the competition. London's 2009 women's wheelchair winner Amanda McGrory won her second title in a course record time of 1:46:31 hours.

In the under-17 Mini Marathon, the 3-mile able-bodied and wheelchair events were won by Robbie Farnham-Rose (14:22), Jessica Judd (15:38), Sheikh Muhidin (12:41) and Jade Jones (13:44).

A total of 163,926 people applied to enter the race, with 50,532 having their application accepted and 35,303 reaching the start line. Among those starters 34,688 runners, 22,427 men and 12,261 women, finished the race. A total of 35 Guinness World Records were set at the competition. The majority of the records were for completing the fastest race in a certain costume, but others included the fastest couple and fastest parent-child pairings. German Uli Killian solved 100 Rubik's Cube puzzles whilst completing the race. Steve Chalke, a Christian social activist, improved the record for the most funds raised for charity through a marathon run, raising £2.3 million for his Oasis Charitable Trust – beating his own record set at the previous year's race. The largest age group present at the race were men in their 30s, followed by men in their 40s. The joint-youngest runners were Michael Bennett and Helen Nutter, both taking part on their eighteenth birthdays (the minimum allowable age), while the oldest participant was 87-year-old Paul Freedman.

Going against the traditionally strict invitational criteria for the elite races, an additional nine Japanese women were a late addition to the field. A 9.0 magnitude earthquake and tsunami struck Tōhoku region of Japan meant that the Nagoya Women's Marathon (a qualifier for the 2011 World Championships) was cancelled and a sympathetic agreement between the London race organisers and the Japan Association of Athletics Federations resulted in London taking the role of the cancelled Nagoya race.

The 2011 London Marathon marked the last time that Dave Bedford acted as the sole race director, with Hugh Brasher (son of former runner Chris Brasher) joining Bedford in a joint role in 2012, and later taking full responsibility.

== Results ==
=== Elite men ===
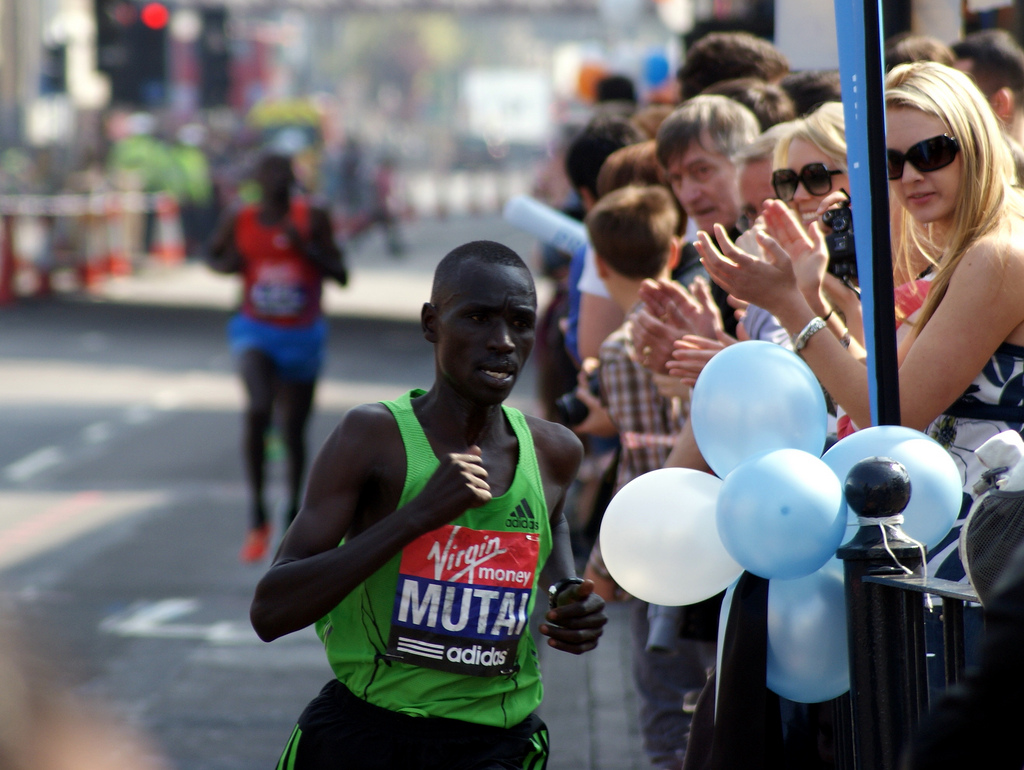
Emmanuel Mutai en route to his course record win

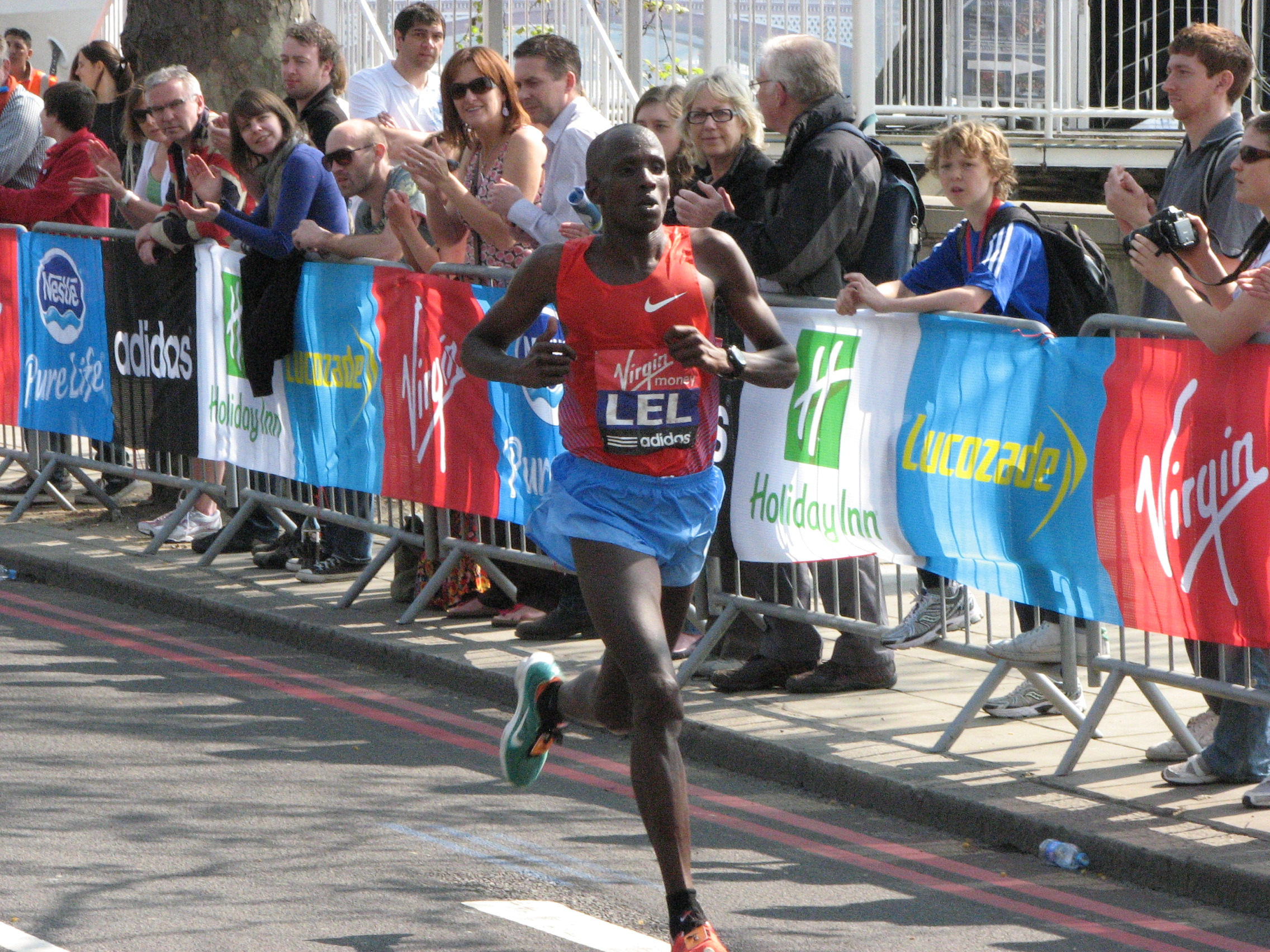
Martin Lel sprinted to take second place.

Position	Athlete	Nationality	Time
1st place, gold medalist(s)	Emmanuel Kipchirchir Mutai	Kenya	2:04:40 CR
2nd place, silver medalist(s)	Martin Lel	Kenya	2:05:45
3rd place, bronze medalist(s)	Patrick Makau Musyoki	Kenya	2:05:45
4	Marílson Gomes dos Santos	Brazil	2:06:34
5	Tsegaye Kebede	Ethiopia	2:07:48
6	Jaouad Gharib	Morocco	2:08:26
7	Dmitry Safronov	Russia	2:09:35
8	Bat-Ochiryn Ser-Od	Mongolia	2:11:35 NR
9	Michael Shelley	Australia	2:11:38
10	Viktor Röthlin	Switzerland	2:12:44
11	Carlos Cordero	Mexico	2:13:13
12	Jason Lehmkuhle	United States	2:13:40
13	Lee Merrien	Great Britain	2:14:27
14	Andrew Lemoncello	Great Britain	2:15:24
15	José Manuel Martínez	Spain	2:15:25
16	Jesper Faurschou	Denmark	2:16:15
17	Tomas Luna Dominguez	Mexico	2:16:58
18	David Webb	Great Britain	2:17:41
19	Daniel Vargas	Mexico	2:19:26
20	John Gilbert	Great Britain	2:19:28
—	Abel Kirui	Kenya	DNF
—	James Kwambai	Kenya	DNF
—	Stanley Biwott	Kenya	DNF
—	Jairus Chanchima	Kenya	DNF
—	Patrick Smyth	United States	DNF
—	Fred Kosgei	Kenya	DNF
—	Lee Troop	Australia	DNF
—	Shadrack Kosgei	Kenya	DNF
—	Yonas Kifle	Eritrea	DNF
—	Mo Trafeh	United States	DNF
—	Ahmad Abdullah	Qatar	DNF
—	Stephen Shay	United States	DNF
—	Arturo Regules	Mexico	DNF
—	Collis Birmingham	Australia	DNF

- Original seventh place finisher Abderrahime Bouramdane of Morocco (2:08:42) was subsequently disqualified for doping.

=== Elite women ===
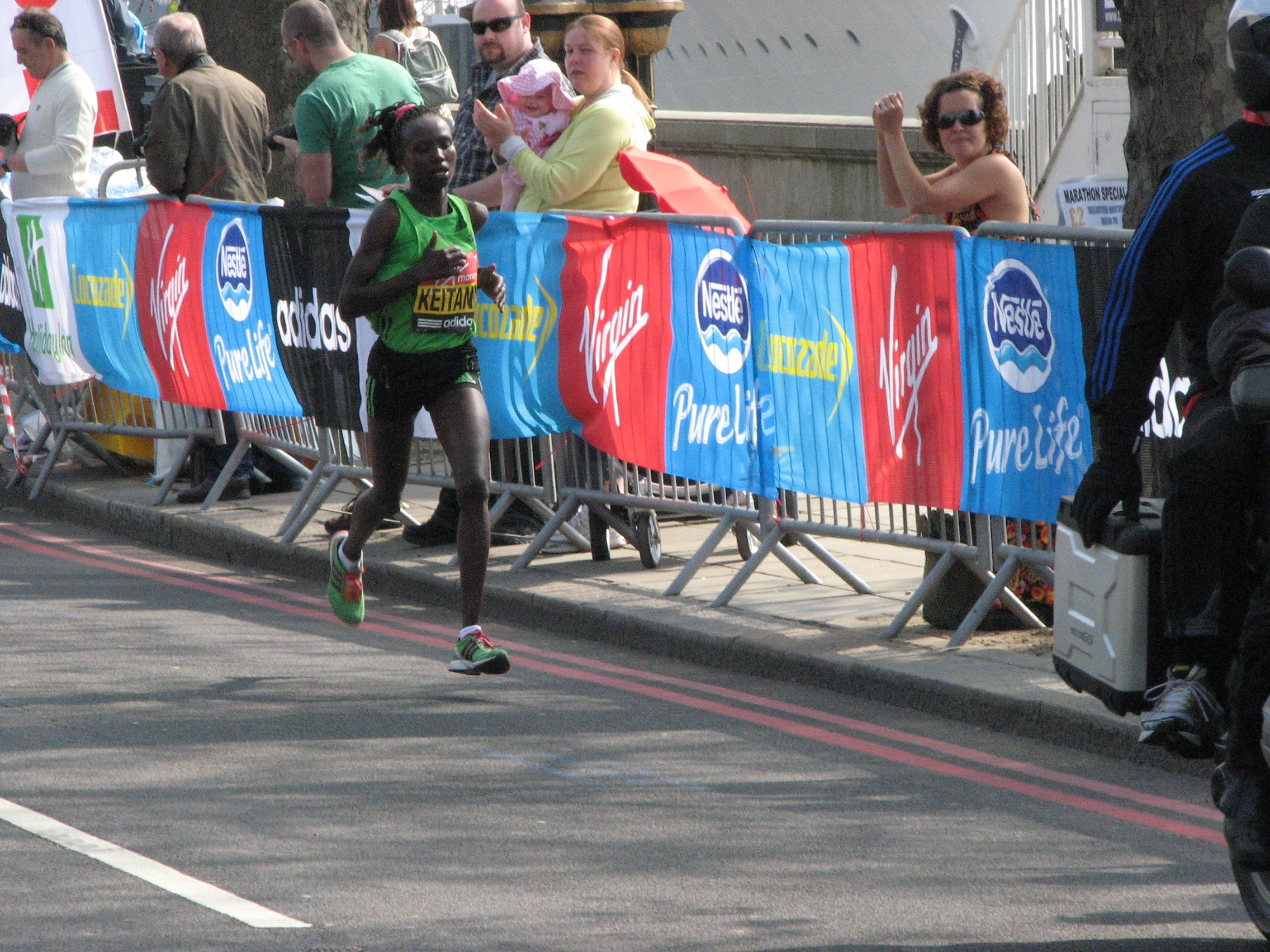
Mary Keitany won the women's race and became the fourth-fastest woman ever.

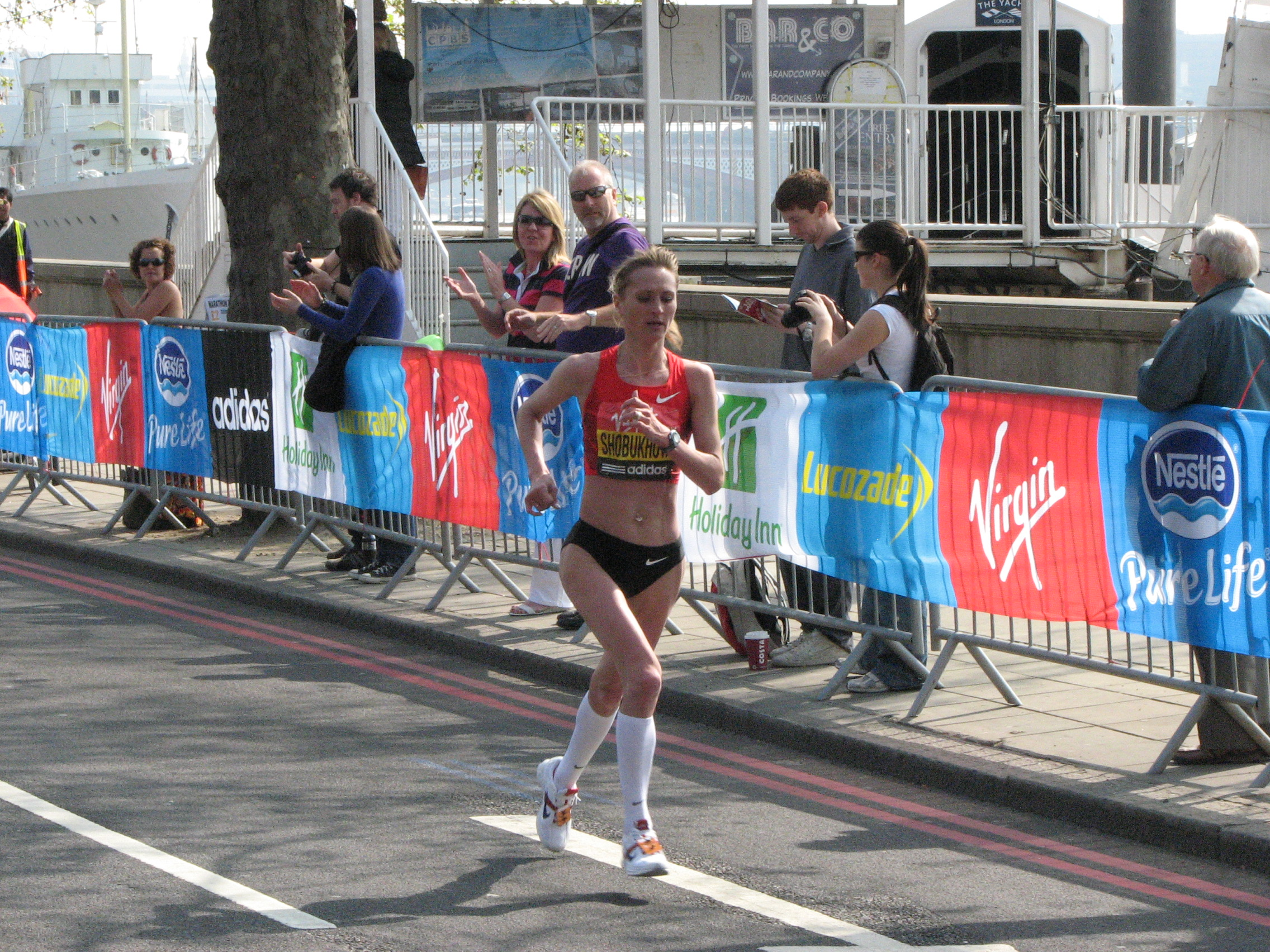
Liliya Shobukhova was second in a Russian record time which was later annulled.

Position	Athlete	Nationality	Time
1st place, gold medalist(s)	Mary Jepkosgei Keitany	Kenya	2:19:19
2nd place, silver medalist(s)	Edna Kiplagat	Kenya	2:20:46
3rd place, bronze medalist(s)	Bezunesh Bekele	Ethiopia	2:23:42
4	Atsede Baysa	Ethiopia	2:23:50
5	Yukiko Akaba	Japan	2:24:09
6	Irina Mikitenko	Germany	2:24:24
7	Jéssica Augusto	Portugal	2:24:33
8	Aberu Kebede	Ethiopia	2:24:34
9	Askale Tafa	Ethiopia	2:25:24
10	Azusa Nojiri	Japan	2:25:29
11	Yoshiko Fujinaga	Japan	2:25:40
12	Zhu Xiaolin	China	2:26:28
13	Noriko Matsuoka	Japan	2:26:54
14	Madaí Perez	Mexico	2:27:02
15	Lornah Kiplagat	Netherlands	2:27:57
16	Jo Pavey	Great Britain	2:28:24
17	Madoka Ogi	Japan	2:29:52
18	Mizuho Nasukawa	Japan	2:30:00
19	Louise Damen	Great Britain	2:30:00
20	Magdalena Lewy-Boulet	United States	2:31:22
21	Risa Shigetomo	Japan	2:31:28
22	Susan Partridge	Great Britain	2:34:13
23	Zhou Chunxiu	China	2:34:29
24	Helen Davies	Great Britain	2:35:43
25	Paula Apolonio	Mexico	2:35:47
26	Tanith Maxwell	South Africa	2:39:07
27	Kirsten Melkevik Otterbu	Norway	2:39:16
28	Yurika Nakamura	Japan	2:41:22
29	Liz Yelling	Great Britain	2:41:34
—	Aselefech Mergia	Ethiopia	DNF
—	Iness Chepkesis Chenonge	Kenya	DNF
—	Anikó Kálovics	Hungary	DNF

- There were multiple retrospective doping disqualifications in the women's race. Original runner-up Liliya Shobukhova had her Russian record of 2:20:15 annulled. Tenth place Mariya Konovalova and fifteenth place Inga Abitova (both also of Russia) had their runs of 2:25:18 and 2:26:31 disqualified.

=== Wheelchair men ===
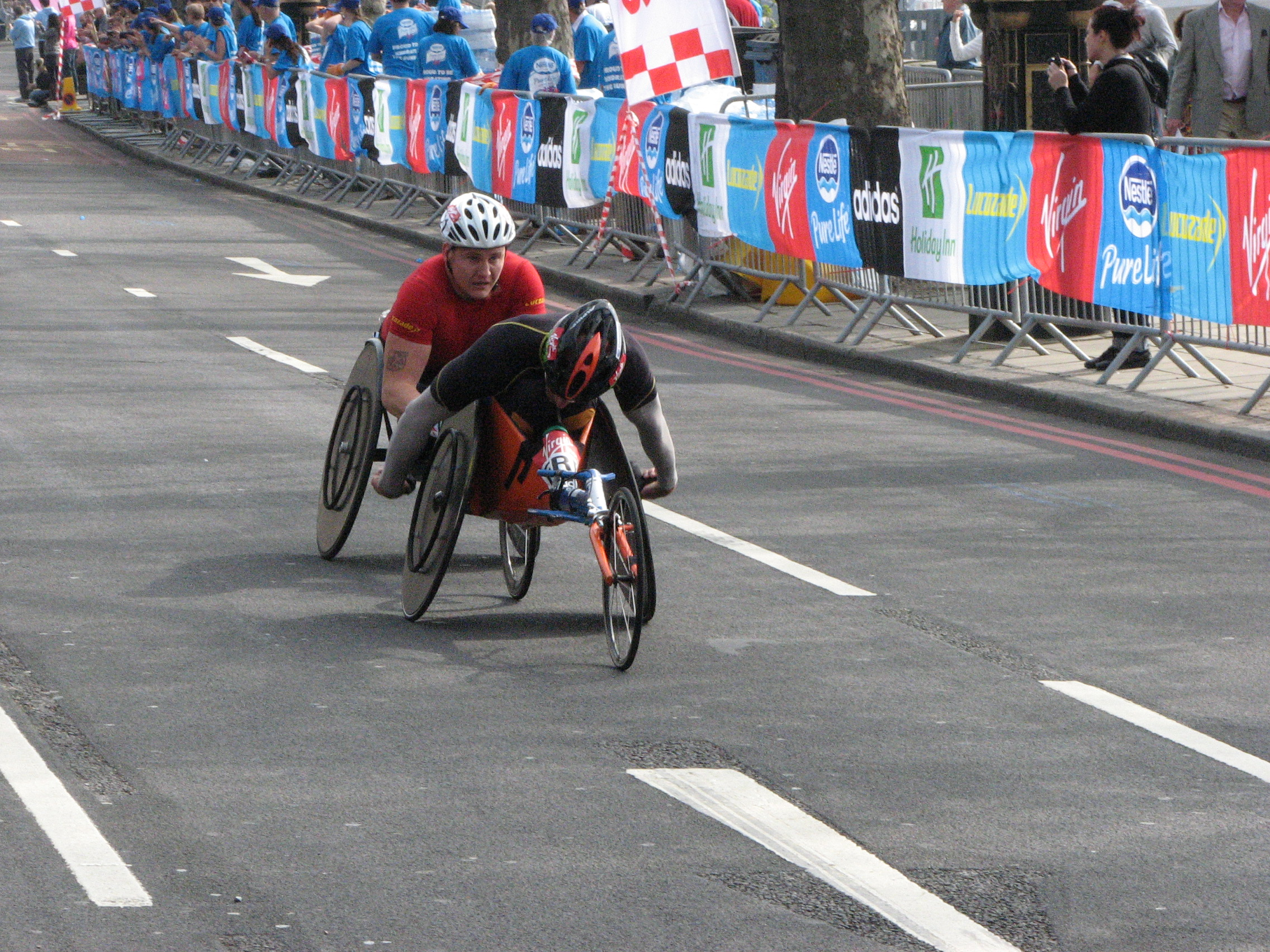
David Weir and Heinz Frei duelling in the men's wheelchair race

Position	Athlete	Nationality	Time
1st place, gold medalist(s)	David Weir	Great Britain	1:30:05
2nd place, silver medalist(s)	Heinz Frei	Switzerland	1:30:07
3rd place, bronze medalist(s)	Tomasz Hamerlak	Poland	1:30:54
4	Roger Puigbò	Spain	1:30:55
5	Josh Cassidy	Canada	1:30:56
6	Nobukazu Hanaoka	Japan	1:30:57
7	Saúl Mendoza	Mexico	1:31:01
8	Choke Yasuoka	Japan	1:31:01
9	Denis Lemeunier	France	1:31:01
10	Jordi Jiménez	Spain	1:34:41
11	Marcel Hug	Switzerland	1:35:35
12	Simon Lawson	Great Britain	1:43:19
13	Hiroyuki Yamamoto	Japan	1:43:39
14	Mark Telford	Great Britain	1:45:54
15	Richard Colman	Australia	1:49:03

=== Wheelchair women ===
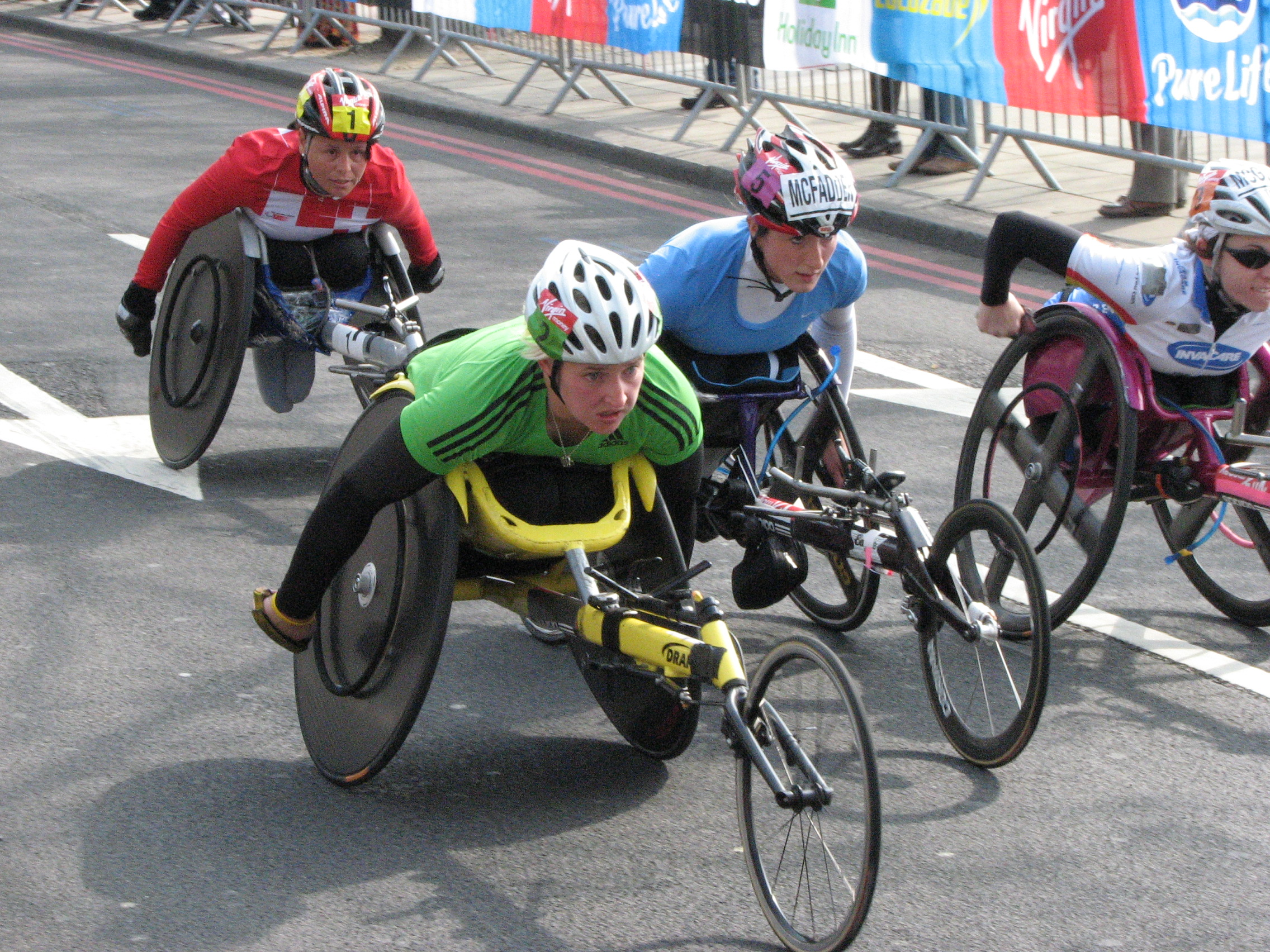
Action from the women's wheelchair race

Position	Athlete	Nationality	Time
1st place, gold medalist(s)	Amanda McGrory	United States	1:46:31 CR
2nd place, silver medalist(s)	Shelly Woods	Great Britain	1:46:31
3rd place, bronze medalist(s)	Sandra Graf	Switzerland	1:46:33
4	Tatyana McFadden	United States	1:46:34
5	Diane Roy	Canada	1:57:03
6	Sarah Piercy	Great Britain	2:25:13
