= Edna Kiplagat =

Kenyan long-distance runner

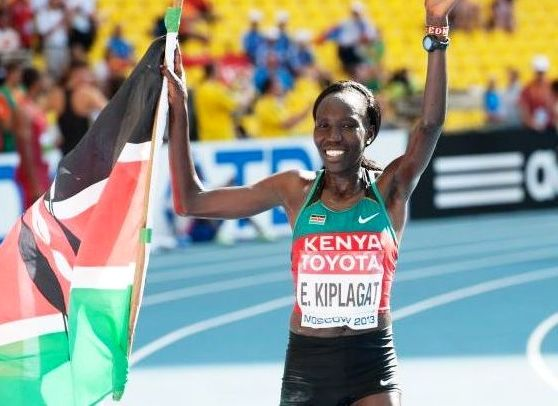
- Kiplagat at the 2013 World Championships

Personal information
- Full name: Edna Ngeringwony Kiplagat
- Nationality: Kenyan
- Born: 15 November 1979 (age 47)
- Employer: Puma
- Height: 1.62 m (5 ft 4 in)
- Weight: 50 kg (110 lb)

Sport
- Country: Kenya
- Sport: Athletics
- Event: Long-distance running

Achievements and titles
- Olympic finals: 2012 London; Marathon - 19th
- World finals: 2011 Daegu; Marathon - Gold; 2013 Moscow; Marathon - Gold; 2015 Beijing; Marathon - 5th; 2017 London; Marathon - Silver; 2019 Doha; Marathon - 4th
- Personal bests: Marathon: 2:19:50 (London 2012); Half marathon: 1:07:52 (Houston 2024); 10 km: 31:06 (Boston 2016); Track; 10,000 m: 33:27.0 (Nairobi 2007); 5000 m: 15:57.3 (Nairobi 2006)
Medal record
Women's athletics
Representing Kenya
World Championships
| Gold medal – first place | 2011 Daegu | Marathon |
| Gold medal – first place | 2013 Moscow | Marathon |
| Silver medal – second place | 2017 London | Marathon |
World Junior Championships
| Silver medal – second place | 1996 Sydney | 3000 m |
| Bronze medal – third place | 1998 Annecy | 3000 m |
World Marathon Majors
| Gold medal – first place | 2010 New York | Marathon |
| Gold medal – first place | 2014 London | Marathon |
| Gold medal – first place | 2017 Boston | Marathon |
| Gold medal – first place | 2021 Boston | Marathon |
| Silver medal – second place | 2011 London | Marathon |
| Silver medal – second place | 2012 London | Marathon |
| Silver medal – second place | 2013 London | Marathon |
| Silver medal – second place | 2016 Chicago | Marathon |
| Silver medal – second place | 2019 Boston | Marathon |
| Bronze medal – third place | 2016 Tokyo | Marathon |
| Bronze medal – third place | 2024 Boston | Marathon |

Edna Ngeringwony Kiplagat (born 15 November 1979) is a Kenyan professional long-distance runner. She was the 2011 and 2013 World Champion in the marathon. She established herself as an elite marathon runner with wins at the Los Angeles and New York City Marathons in 2010, and with four overall wins, she's tied for the third-most women's World Marathon Majors titles. She is also the oldest winner of a World Marathon Major, male or female, winning the 2021 Boston Marathon at age 41.

Her personal best for the distance is 2:19:50 hours, set at the London Marathon in 2012. At age 37, Kiplagat won the 2017 Boston Marathon in a time of 2:21:52 hours, and won the marathon silver medal at the IAAF World Championships in London. At age 39, she was second at the 2019 Boston Marathon and fourth in the event at the following World Championships.

== Career ==
At the 3000 metres distance, Kiplagat won a silver medal at the 1996 World Junior Championships and a bronze medal at the 1998 World Junior Championships.

She finished thirteenth in the long race at the 2006 World Cross Country Championships. In the same season she recorded personal bests in the 5000 metres, with 15:57.3 minutes in July in Nairobi, and the half marathon, with 1:09:32 hours in October in San Jose. In June 2007 she ran the 10,000 metres in 33:27.0 minutes in Nairobi. She won the 2006 Virginia Beach Rock 'n' Roll Half Marathon, the 2007 Lilac Bloomsday Run and the 2007 Bay to Breakers (San Francisco).

=== 2010 ===
Kiplagat finished second behind Emily Chebet at the 2010 Freihofer's Run for Women, running a time of 15:20 and winning $5000 in the process. She managed third place at the Beach to Beacon race in August 2010, and completed the same feat at the Falmouth Road Race two weeks later (finishing behind Lineth Chepkurui and Wude Ayalew at both competitions).

Kiplagat won the Los Angeles Marathon in 2010, only her second marathon ever, and went on to win the 2010 New York City Marathon. She defeated two marathon debutantes, Shalane Flanagan of the United States and Mary Keitany of Kenya, who took second and third, respectively.

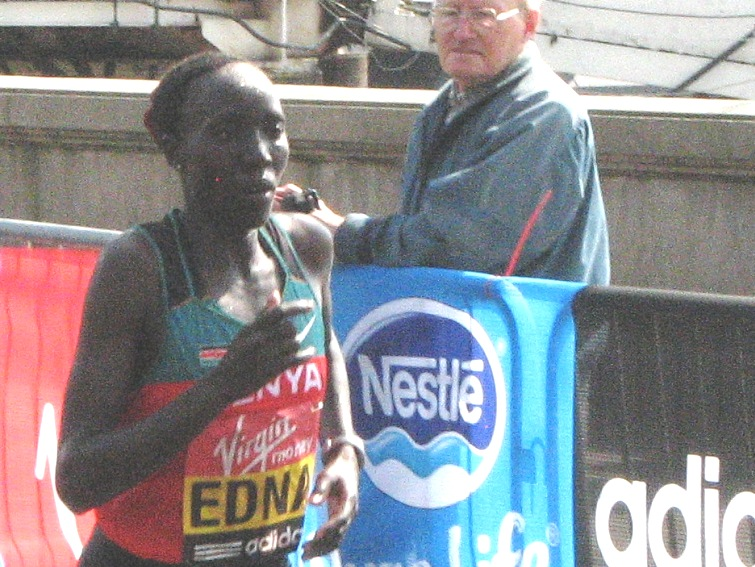
Kiplagat at the 2011 London Marathon

=== 2011 ===
She ran a career best of 1:09:00 at the New York City Half Marathon, finishing as runner-up behind Caroline Rotich. She took on Keitany again at the 2011 London Marathon, but was outrun by her domestic rival. Still, Kiplagat was pleased with her third-place performance as her time of 2:20:46 marked a significant personal best, improving upon her previous time by almost five minutes. Kiplagat was the race favourite for the 2011 World Championships Marathon and delivered on her form, taking the women's title in a time of 2:28:43 hours. Her win did not look assured when she fell over in the last 5 km, but her teammate and eventual third placer Sharon Cherop stopped mid-race to help Kiplagat to her feet. Kiplagat, Cherop and Priscah Jeptoo made it a medal sweep for Kenya – the first time that any nation had taken all three medals at a global marathon championship. She entered the Montferland Run with a slight injury and finished as runner-up to Abebech Afework.

=== 2012 ===
She began 2012 on grass and came third at the Kenyan Cross Country Championships. This was her preparation for the 2012 London Marathon, where she was the last runner to challenge eventual winner Mary Keitany and ended the race as runner-up in a personal best of 2:19:50 hours. Kiplagat was selected for the Kenyan Olympic team as a result. She was a comfortable winner of the New York Mini 10K in June. At the 2012 London Olympics she failed to repeat her success in the British capital and managed only twentieth place in the Olympic marathon with a time of 2:27:52 hours. Six weeks later she ran at the Great North Run and had a better performance, setting a personal best of 1:07:41 hours while finishing runner-up to Tirunesh Dibaba.

=== 2013 ===
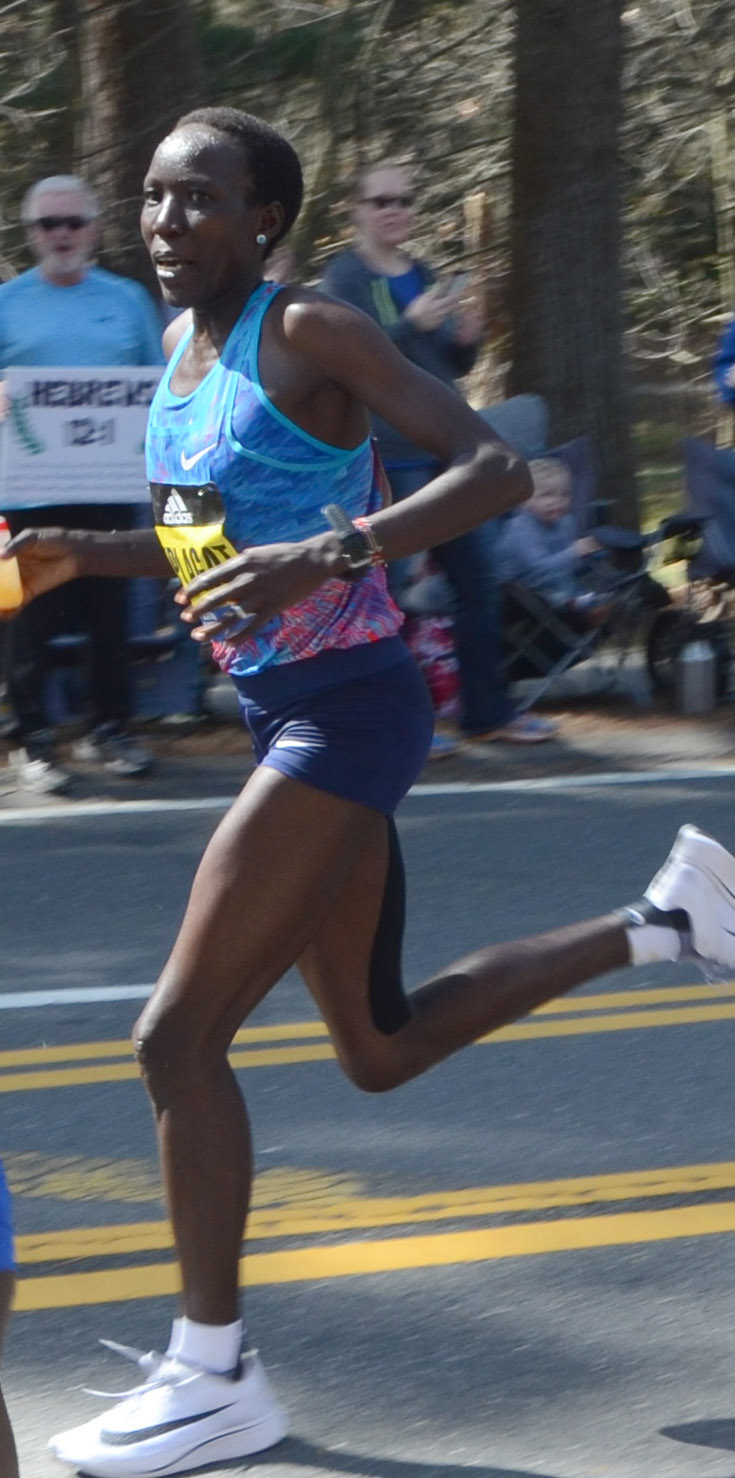
Edna Kiplagat near the halfway point in the 2017 Boston Marathon which she won

Kiplagat finished runner-up in the London Marathon for the second consecutive year, on this occasion behind Priscah Jeptoo.

Later in 2013 she became the first woman to retain the marathon world title when she earned the first gold medal on the opening day of the World Athletics Championships, taking victory ahead of Valeria Straneo and Kayoko Fukushi in a time of 2:25:44 hours.

=== 2014 ===
After finishing on the podium in each of the previous three editions, Kiplagat finally claimed victory at the London Marathon ahead of (unrelated) compatriot Florence Kiplagat in a time of 2:20:21 hours.

Kiplagat ended 2014 with a 2:36:24 finish (13th place) at the 2014 New York City Marathon.

=== 2015 ===
Kiplagat returned to the 2015 London Marathon with a time of 2:27:16 hours (11th place). She finished in fifth place at the 2015 IAAF World Championships in Beijing with a time of 2:28:15 hours.

=== 2016 ===
2016 saw Kiplagat return to the Top 3 of major races with significantly faster finishing times than just one year prior. She finished in 2:22:36 hours for 3rd place at the 2016 Tokyo Marathon, and in 2:23:28 hours for 2nd place at the 2016 Chicago Marathon.

=== 2017 ===
At age 37, Kiplagat won the 2017 Boston Marathon in a time of 2:21:52 hours.

This victory was her debut Boston Marathon after over a decade of exceptional running. "I have done almost everything in our sport, but it was one of my dreams to run Boston, the world's oldest marathon," says Kiplagat. "And it will also mean I have run five of the six Abbott World Marathon Majors in addition to both the Olympic Games and World Championships."

In August, Kiplagat participated in the 2017 World Championships in Athletics held in London. She won the silver medal in the women's marathon in a time of 2:27:18. She was preceded by Rose Chelimo.

=== 2021 ===
Kiplagat competed in the 2021 Boston Marathon, which had been moved to the Columbus Day holiday in October, less than one month before her 42nd birthday. She was declared the winner after compatriot Diana Kipyokei, who finished ahead of her by 24 seconds, was disqualified for use of a performance-enhancing corticosteroid. Kiplagat was retroactively elevated to first place. Her victory made her the oldest runner, either male or female, to have won a World Marathon Major event. At the time of her win, she was more than three years older than the previous female recordholder, Constantina Diță.

== Achievements ==
=== World Marathon Majors results ===
| World Marathon Majors | 2010 | 2011 | 2012 | 2013 | 2014 | 2015 | 2016 | 2017 | 2018 | 2019 | 2020 | 2021 | 2022 | 2023 | 2024 | 2025 | 2026 |
|---|---|---|---|---|---|---|---|---|---|---|---|---|---|---|---|---|---|
| Tokyo Marathon | - | - | - | - | - | - | 3rd | - | - | - | - | p | - | - | - | - | - |
| Boston Marathon | - | - | - | - | - | - | - | 1st | 9th | 2nd | x | 1st | 4th | 10th | 3rd | 38th | - |
| London Marathon | - | 2nd | 2nd | 2nd | 1st | 10th | - | - | - | - | - | - | - | - | - | - | - |
| Berlin Marathon | - | - | - | - | - | - | - | - | 4th | - | x | - | - | - | - | - | - |
| Chicago Marathon | - | - | - | - | - | - | 2nd | - | - | - | x | - | - | - | - | - | - |
| New York City Marathon | 1st | - | - | 9th | 12th | - | - | 4th | - | - | x | - | 4th | 7th | - | - | 4th |

== Personal life ==
Kiplagat hails from Iten, Kenya, and trained as a police officer.

"I am one of the role models in my town and country," says Kiplagat. "I have mentored girls in school and I have empowered women to form community associations. I also support less fortunate kids to pay their school fees."

Kiplagat and her husband have five children – two of her own, two adopted from her sister who died of breast cancer in 2003, and one adopted from a neighbor who died in childbirth in 2013. Her children Wendy and Carlos were at the finish line and award ceremony for her victory in the 121st annual Boston Marathon. They live in Longmont Colorado. She started the Edna Kiplagat Foundation to raise awareness of breast cancer. Kiplagat also volunteers to create awareness for garbage management toward keeping a clean environment. Kiplagat is a devout Roman Catholic.
