= Emmanuel Kipchirchir Mutai =

Kenyan marathon runner (born 1984)

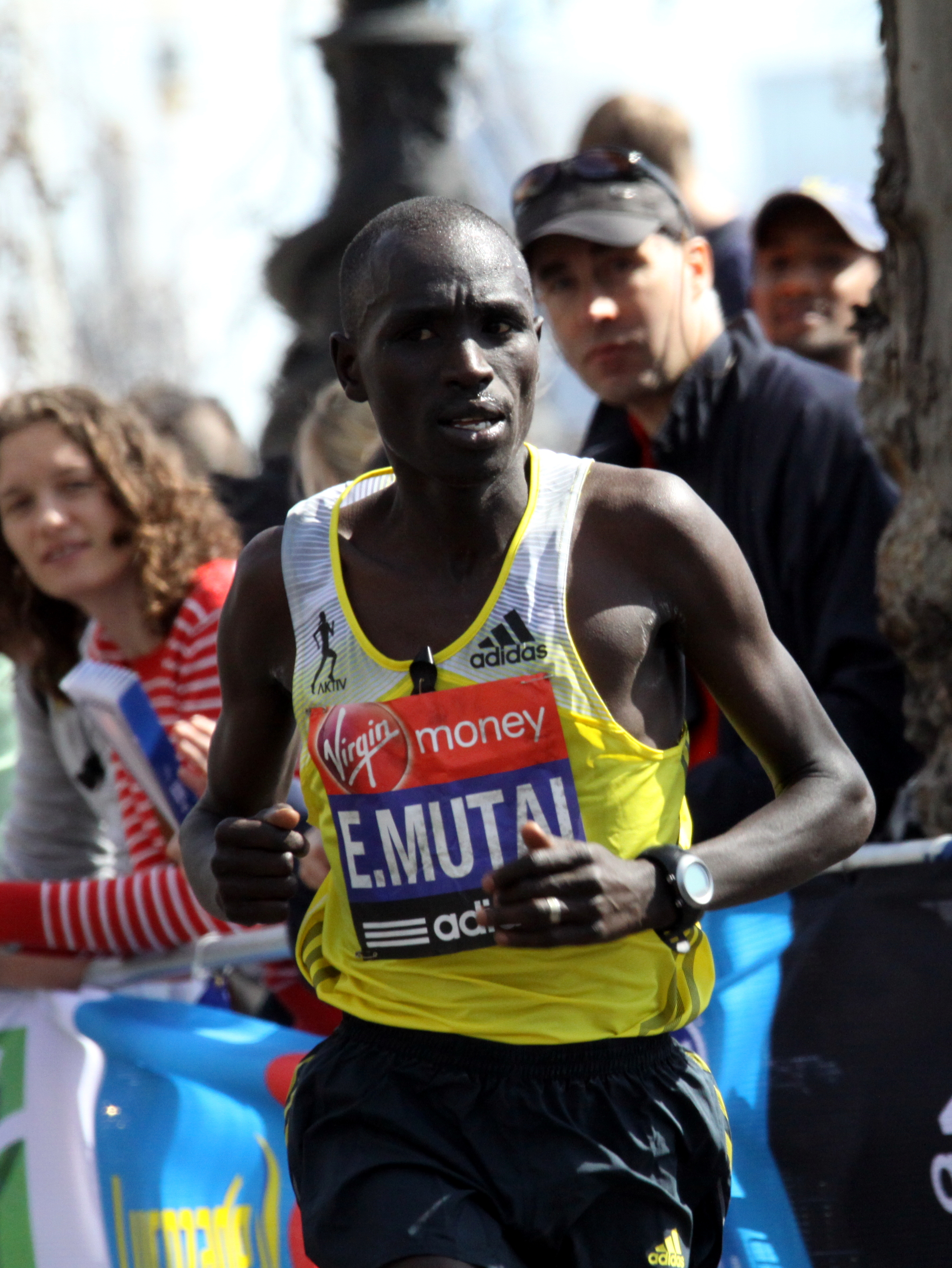
- Mutai at the 2013 London Marathon

Personal information
- Born: 12 October 1984 (age 41) Cheptigit in Kaptagat
- Height: 1.62 m (5 ft 4 in)
- Weight: 52 kg (115 lb)

Sport
- Country: Kenya
- Sport: Athletics
- Event: Marathon
Medal record
World Championships
Silver medal – second place	2009 Berlin	Marathon
World Marathon Majors
Silver medal – second place	2014 Berlin	Marathon
Silver medal – second place	2013 Chicago	Marathon
Silver medal – second place	2013 London	Marathon
Silver medal – second place	2011 New York City	Marathon
Gold medal – first place	2011 London	Marathon
Silver medal – second place	2010 New York City	Marathon
Silver medal – second place	2010 London	Marathon

Emmanuel Kipchirchir Mutai (born 12 October 1984) is a long-distance runner from Kenya, who specialises in marathons. As of February 2026 his time of 2:03:13 is now the joint 18th fastest of all time. When he ran that time it was the 2nd fastest time ever and is the 3rd fastest ever with a non carbon shoe.

Initially running in half marathons, he made his debut over the full distance in 2007 and won his first race later that year at the Amsterdam Marathon. He was fourth at both the 2008 and 2009 London Marathons, but managed to reach the podium at the 2009 World Championships, claiming the silver medal. His 2010 racing saw him finish as runner-up twice at the London and New York City Marathons. At the 2011 London Marathon he won on his fourth attempt with a course record and personal best time of 2:04:40.

En route to his second-place finish at the 2014 Berlin Marathon (2:03:13), Mutai set a world record at the 30K distance (1:27:37).

== Career ==
=== Early life ===
Mutai grew up in Cheptigit, a village near Kaptagat, Uasin Gishu County in the Rift Valley Province, and his extended family includes Richard Limo, the 2001 World Champion over 5000 metres. Mutai began to make an impact domestically at the age of eighteen, taking third place over 10,000 metres at the Rift North Province Championships in 28:09.2 minutes.

It was on the roads of Europe that he began to make a name for himself, beginning with a win at the Nice Half Marathon in April 2006 and then a 10K best of 27:51 minutes for second place at the 10 km du Conseil Général 13 behind Edwin Soi (one of the fastest runs that year). He fared poorly on the track at the FBK Games the following month, but improved his half marathon best to 1:00:49 hours at the highly competitive Rotterdam Half Marathon, where he came sixth.

=== Marathon debut ===
Mutai was fifth at the Lisbon Half Marathon in March 2007, a race which preceded his debut over the marathon distance the following month. At the Rotterdam Marathon he completed the course in a time of 2:13:06 hours, placing seventh in a race affected by high temperatures. He defeated strong opposition in Robert Kipkoech Cheruiyot and world champion Jaouad Gharib at the Portugal Half Marathon in September, winning the Lisbon race with a quick finish. Mutai and Richard Limo did the front running at the Amsterdam Marathon the following month and the tactic paid off, as Mutai won his first marathon in a time of 2:06:29 hours – the second fastest mark that year after Haile Gebrselassie's world record run.

He began 2008 with a third-place finish at the 20 van Alphen race in the Netherlands. The London Marathon was his next destination and he improved his best time to 2:06:15 hours, although this was only enough for fourth in a fast race with three men under two hours and six minutes. Mutai's next outing was also in the United Kingdom and he broke the course record for the Great Scottish Run in Glasgow. His final run of 2008 was at the Chicago Marathon and he began strongly, pushing the race tempo to the point where he forced the pacemaker to prematurely drop out. However, he suffered in the latter stages of the race and ended up in sixth.

=== World Championship medal ===
Mutai again used the Lisbon Half Marathon as preparation for a spring Marathon in 2009 and he proved to be in good form, setting a personal best of 1:00:45 hours. At the 2009 London Marathon he posted his third sub-2:07 time, but again this left him in fourth place in the perennially fast race while Samuel Wanjiru broke the course record. He gained his first international selection that year as he was chosen for the marathon at the 2009 World Championships in Athletics. He remained among the leading pack and the race came down to a duel between Mutai and Abel Kirui in the latter stages. It was Kirui who took the lead to claim the title, but Mutai took the silver medal in a time of 2:07:48 hours, which was the second fastest ever run at the event. He set a half marathon best at the end of the year, running 1:00:39 for second place behind Silas Sang at the Portugal Half Marathon.

He ran on home turf at the beginning of 2010, coming third at the Discovery Half Marathon in Eldoret. He followed this with another personal best in Lisbon, approaching the hour mark with a time of 1:00:03 for third while Zersenay Tadese won in a world record time. At the 2010 London Marathon, Mutai could not keep pace with eventual winner Tsegaye Kebede, but he persevered nevertheless and made the podium for the first time, finishing in 2:06:23 for second place – his best ever placing at the race. The 2010 New York City Marathon was a closer affair, as Mutai and Gebre Gebremariam were neck-and-neck after 40 km, but Mutai was again relegated to second as his rival pulled away to win.

=== Breakthrough at 2011 London Marathon ===
Mutai won his first World Marathon Major event in April 2011, taking the title at the 2011 London Marathon with a course record and new personal best time of 2:04:40. This made him the fourth fastest runner ever over the distance. He was one of the favourites for the Great North Run, but it was half marathon specialist Martin Mathathi who took the honours and Mutai finished in third. His next major race was the 2011 New York City Marathon and his time of 2:06:28 hours was faster than the course record, although he was second place to Geoffrey Mutai. He attempted to defend his title at the 2012 London Marathon, but ended up in seventh some way off the winner Wilson Kipsang. Following the injury of Moses Mosop, he was drafted into the Kenyan Olympic marathon team as a replacement.

== Achievements ==
- All results regarding marathon and half marathon

Year	Competition	Venue	Position	Notes
Representing Kenya
2006	Nice Half Marathon	Nice, France	1st	1:01:24
2006	Rotterdam Half Marathon	Rotterdam, Netherlands	6th	1:00:49
2007	Lisbon Half Marathon	Lisbon, Portugal	1st	1:01:54
2007	Rotterdam Marathon	Rotterdam, Netherlands	7th	2:13:06
2007	Amsterdam Marathon	Amsterdam, Netherlands	1st	2:06:29
2008	Great Scottish Run	Glasgow, United Kingdom	1st	1:01:10 (course record)
2008	Chicago Marathon	Chicago, United States	6th	2:09:52
2008	London Marathon	London, United Kingdom	4th	2:06:15
2009	Lisbon Half Marathon	Lisbon, Portugal	2nd	1:00:39
2009	London Marathon	London, United Kingdom	4th	2:06:53
2009	World Championships	Berlin, Germany	2nd	2:07:48
2010	Eldoret Half Marathon	Eldoret, Kenya	3rd	1:02:13
2010	Lisbon Half Marathon	Lisbon, Portugal	3rd	1:00:03
2010	London Marathon	London, United Kingdom	2nd	2:06:23
2010	New York Marathon	New York City, United States	2nd	2:09:18
2011	London Marathon	London, United Kingdom	1st	2:04:40
2011	Great North Run	South Shields, United Kingdom	3rd	59:52 (downhill course)
2011	New York Marathon	New York City, United States	2nd	2:06:28
2012	London Marathon	London, United Kingdom	7th	2:08:01
2012	Olympic Games	London, United Kingdom	17th	2:14:49
2013	London Marathon	London, United Kingdom	2nd	2:06:33
2013	Chicago Marathon	Chicago, United States	2nd	2:03:52
2014	London Marathon	London, United Kingdom	7th	2:08:19
2014	Berlin Marathon	Berlin, Germany	2nd	2:03:13
2015	London Marathon	London, United Kingdom	11th	2:10:54
2015	Berlin Marathon	Berlin, Germany	4th	2:07:46
2016	Tokyo Marathon	Tokyo, Japan	7th	2:10:23
2016	Berlin Marathon	Berlin, Germany	12th	2:10:29
2017	Venice Marathon	Venice, Italy	12th	2:10:14
2018	Hamburg Marathon	Hamburg, Germany	9th	2:11:57
2018	Abu Dhabi Marathon	Abu Dhabi, United Arab Emirates	7th	2:12:38
