= Askale Tafa =

Ethiopian long-distance runner

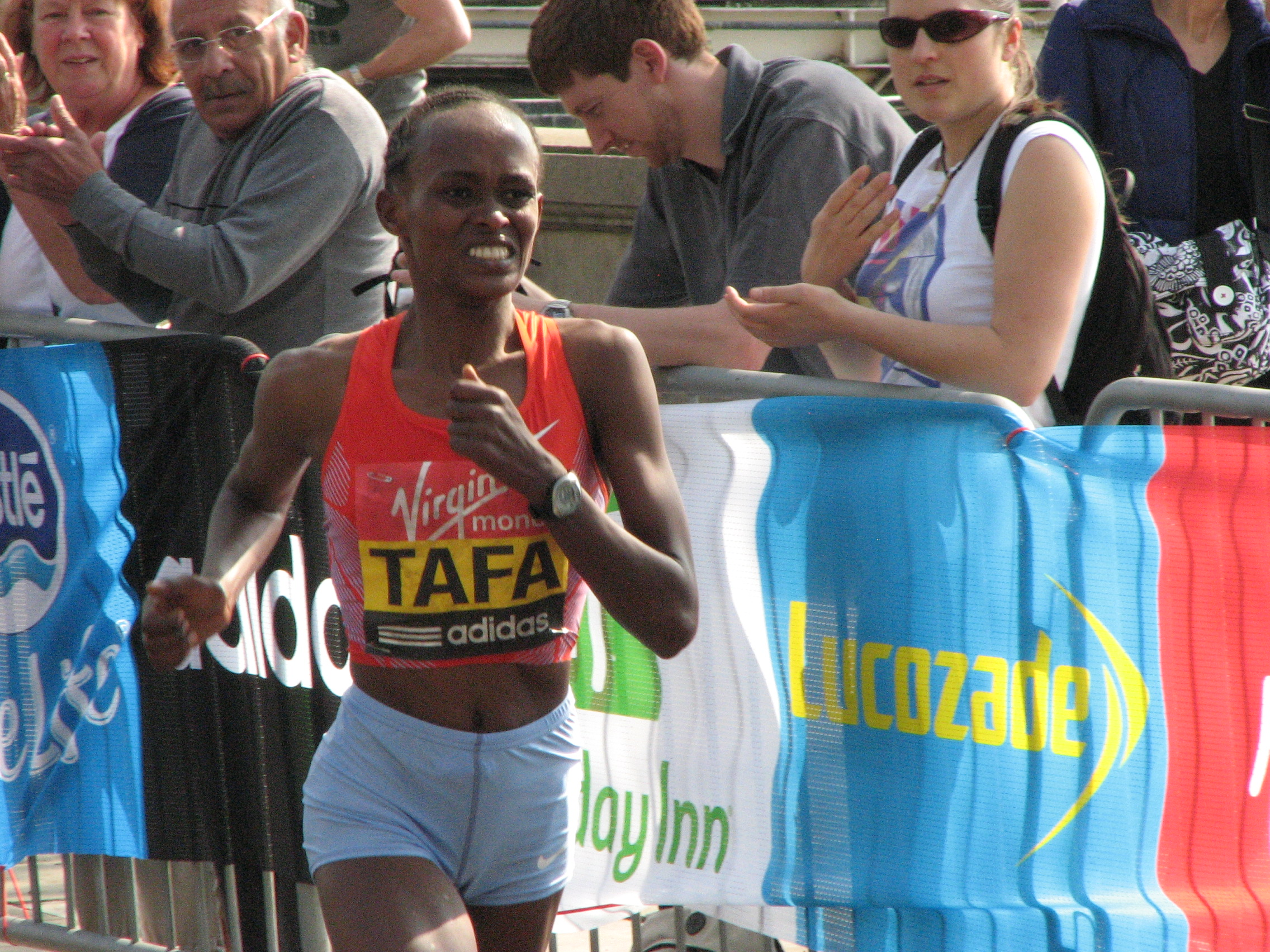
Askale at the 2011 London Marathon

Askale Tafa Magarsa (born 27 September 1984) is an Ethiopian long-distance runner, who has specialised in the marathon. Her sister, Tafa Megersa Mergertu, is also a marathon runner.

== Career ==
In 2005, she was third in the Rome Marathon. In 2006, she won the Milan Marathon and was second at the Berlin 25 km in 1:28.13. The following year she won the Dubai Marathon and was first in the Paris Marathon in 2:25.07. At the 2007 World Championships in Athletics in Osaka she earned a 22nd-place finish.

The year 2008 began with third place at the Dubai Marathon with a time of 2:23.23, finishing 41 seconds behind the winner. In the Boston Marathon, she was fifth. In the 2008 Berlin Marathon she finished second in a new personal best time of 2:21:31. She took part in the 2010 London Marathon and finished fifth, just behind her compatriots Bezunesh Bekele and Aselefech Mergia. She was eleventh at the 2011 London Marathon the following year. She entered the 2011 Chicago Marathon, but was slower than her typical pace and finished eighth overall. She was the runner-up at the 2012 Seoul International Marathon, finishing just behind compatriot Feyse Tadese.

She is currently a member of Marathon Elites Athletic Management Canada/Ethiopia and coached by her husband Tola Daba. Her husband Tola Debel Gudeta is also a long-distance runner with a PB of 2:23 hours in the marathon and 1:03 in the 20 km.

== Achievements ==
- All results regarding marathon, unless stated otherwise

| Year | Competition | Venue | Position | Notes |
Representing Ethiopia
| 2007 | Dubai Marathon | Dubai, United Arab Emirates | 1st | 2:27:19 |
| 2007 | Paris Marathon | Paris, France | 1st | 2:25:07 |
| 2007 | Milan Marathon | Milan, Italy | 1st | 2:27:57 |

- 2005 Rome Marathon 2:32.34, 3rd
- 2005 Berlin Marathon 2:28.27, 3rd
- 2006 Arizona Marathon 2:31.46, 2nd
- 2006 San Diego Marathon 2:29.47, 4th
- 2007 World Championships Marathon 2:38.01, 22nd
- 2008 Dubai Marathon 2:23.23, 3rd
- 2008 Boston Marathon 2:29.48, 5th
- 2008 Berlin Marathon 2:21:31, 2nd

== Personal bests ==
- Half marathon - 1:09:37 hrs (2008)
- Marathon - 2:21.31 hrs (2008)
