= Tsegaye Kebede =

Ethiopian long-distance runner (born 1987)

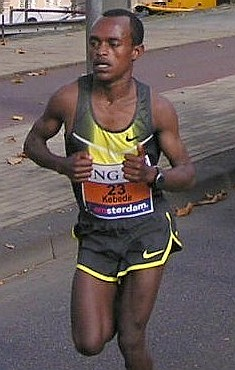
- Kebede at the 2007 Amsterdam Marathon

Personal information
- Nationality: Ethiopian
- Born: 15 January 1987 (age 39) Mekelle, Tigray Province, Ethiopia
- Height: 5 ft 2 in (1.57 m)
- Weight: 110 lb (50 kg)

Sport
- Sport: Running
- Event: Long distances
Medal record
Men's athletics
Representing Ethiopia
Olympic Games
| Bronze medal – third place | 2008 Beijing | Marathon |
World Championships in Athletics
| Bronze medal – third place | 2009 Berlin | Marathon |

Tsegaye Kebede Wordofa (Amharic: ፀጋየ ከበደ ዎርዶፋ; born 15 January 1987) is an Ethiopian long-distance runner who competes in road running events, including marathons. He quickly rose to become a prominent distance runner after his international debut at the Amsterdam Marathon in 2007. In his second year of professional running, he won the Paris Marathon, the Fukuoka Marathon and the marathon bronze medal at the 2008 Beijing Olympics.

In the 2009 season he established himself as one of Ethiopia's top athletes: he came second in the London Marathon and at his first World Championships in Athletics he took the bronze medal in the marathon. He retained his Fukuoka Marathon title at the end of 2009, running the fastest ever marathon race in Japan. He won the 2010 London Marathon – his first World Marathon Major – and the 2013 London Marathon.

== Early years ==
Tsegaye Kebede was brought up as part of a large family, the fifth child of thirteen, and his early years were marked by poverty. Living in Gerar Berak, a village some 40 km north of Addis Ababa or near the town of Sendafa, he collected firewood to sell and herded livestock to supplement his father's earnings, paying for his own education and the rest of his family. He received his primary education at jima senbate school in Sendafa town. He ate one meal a day and had to work every day to earn around 2.50 Ethiopian birr (US$0.30).

He began running for pleasure as an 8-year-old and, after competing at a half marathon in Addis Ababa in 2006, an athletics coach (Getaneh Tessema) offered him the chance to train with his group. He attended a 10 km time trial session with the group in the following days, and he beat all runners with the exception of Deriba Merga, who went on to win the Great Ethiopian Run that year. He won the Abebe Bikila International Marathon a few months later, effectively resolving the visa problems he had encountered while trying to race overseas. His first marathon race abroad was the 2007 Amsterdam Marathon and he finished eighth with a new personal best of 2:08:16. This time and finish established him among Ethiopia's top marathon runners—Haile Gebrselassie and Deriba Merga were the only Ethiopians to run faster times that year.

== Olympic and World Championship competition ==
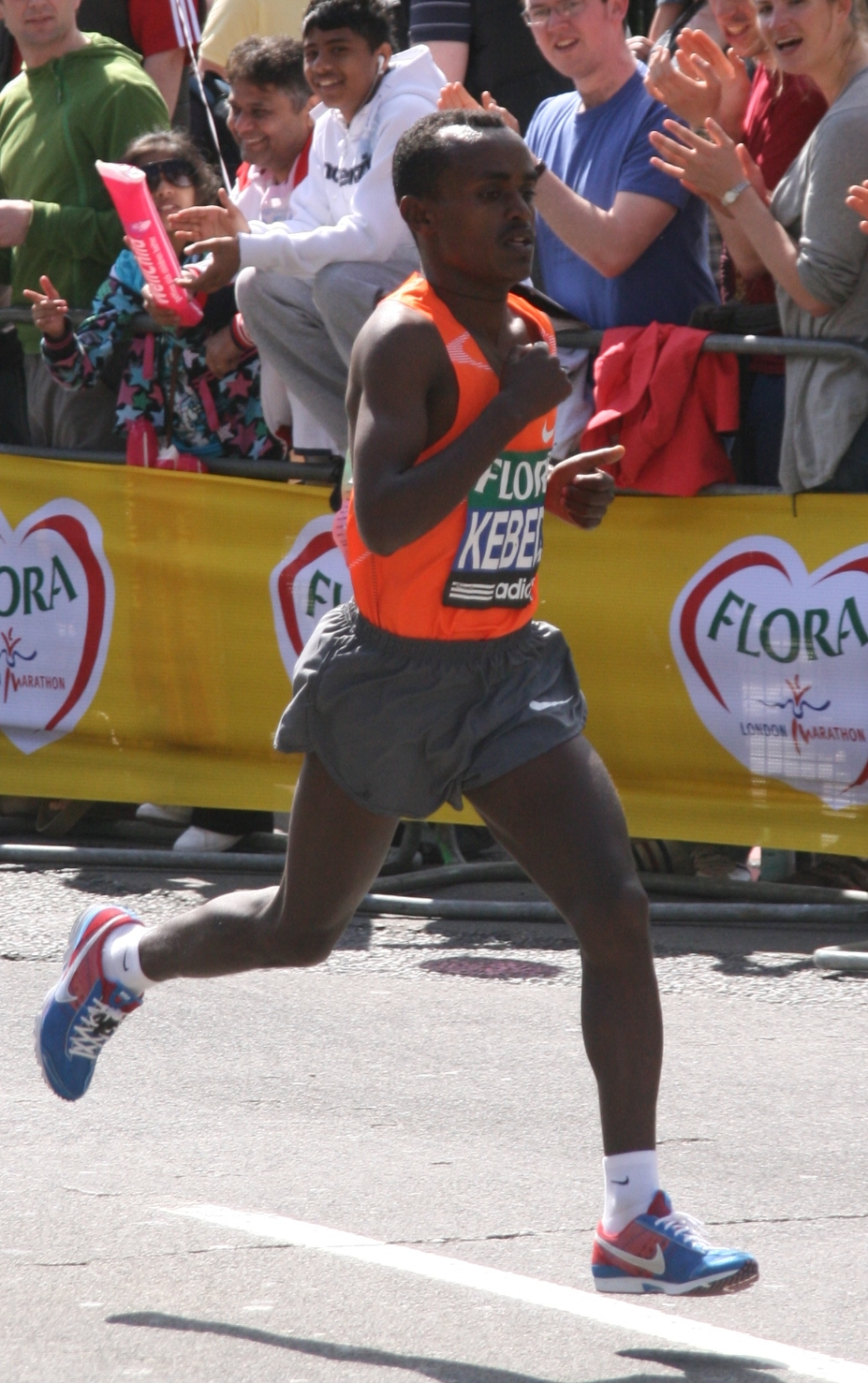
Kebede competing in the 2009 London Marathon

Keen to establish himself, he looked towards obtaining a spot on the Ethiopian 2008 Olympic team for the marathon race. He took second place behind Patrick Makau Musyoki at the Ras Al Khaimah Half Marathon with a time of 59:35, a personal best. A win at the Paris Marathon in April improved his chances of selection, as his sprint finish earned him another personal best with 2:06:40. He finished third in the World 10K Bangalore race the following month, setting a best of 28:10 over the distance. Haile Gebrselassie stated that he did not intend to compete in the Beijing Olympics, meaning that Kebede and Merga would carry the medal hopes for Ethiopia.

With only two years of competitive running and one year of international competition to his credit, the 21-year-old Kebede won the bronze medal in men's marathon at the 2008 Summer Olympics in Beijing, China, passing teammate Deriba Merga in the last 400 metres of the race. He won the Great North Run in October, and finished the year with a win at the Fukuoka International Marathon; his time of 2:06:10 broke Samuel Wanjiru's course record and was the fastest marathon on Japanese soil. This raised him in the rankings to the twelfth fastest ever marathon runner at the time.

He remained in strong form the following year: he set a new personal best of 2:05:20 at the 2009 London Marathon, taking second place behind Wanjiru. This elevated him into the top ten in the all-time marathon lists and made him the second fastest Ethiopian after world record holder Haile Gebrselassie. Representing Ethiopia at the 2009 World Championships in Athletics, Kebede repeated the feat he had achieved a year earlier at the Olympics, overtaking Deriba Merga and taking the bronze medal as the fastest Ethiopian finisher in the World Championship marathon. He improved his best further at the end of that year, winning the Fukuoka International Marathon for a second time. He finished the race in 2:05:18, a new course record and again setting the fastest time ever recorded for the marathon in Japan.

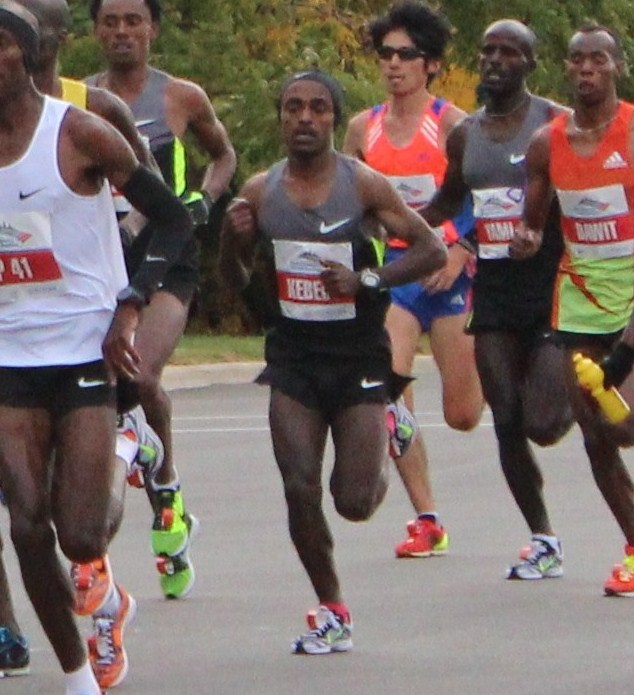
Kebede in the lead pack at the 2012 Chicago Marathon.

At the 2010 London Marathon, he set his sights on beating the defending champion Samuel Wanjiru. Wanjiru dropped out at 20 km, however, and Kebede saw off a challenge from Abel Kirui at the 30 km mark. The pacemakers were not quick through the early stages and Kebede had enough energy to sprint for the line, but his time of 2:05:19 was nine seconds short of the record and a second away from Kebede's best. The 2010 Chicago Marathon in October provided a much closer battle with Wanjiru. Kebede closely followed the pacemakers and repeatedly surged ahead of the field. Wanjiru managed to make up ground each time and, running in increasingly high temperatures, Kebede was overtaken by him in the last 400 m and he finished in second place with a time of 2:06:43. This result also left him behind Wanjiru in the race for the World Marathon Majors jackpot, but he was generally positive about the defeat: "I am happy. This is not the end. I will run again".

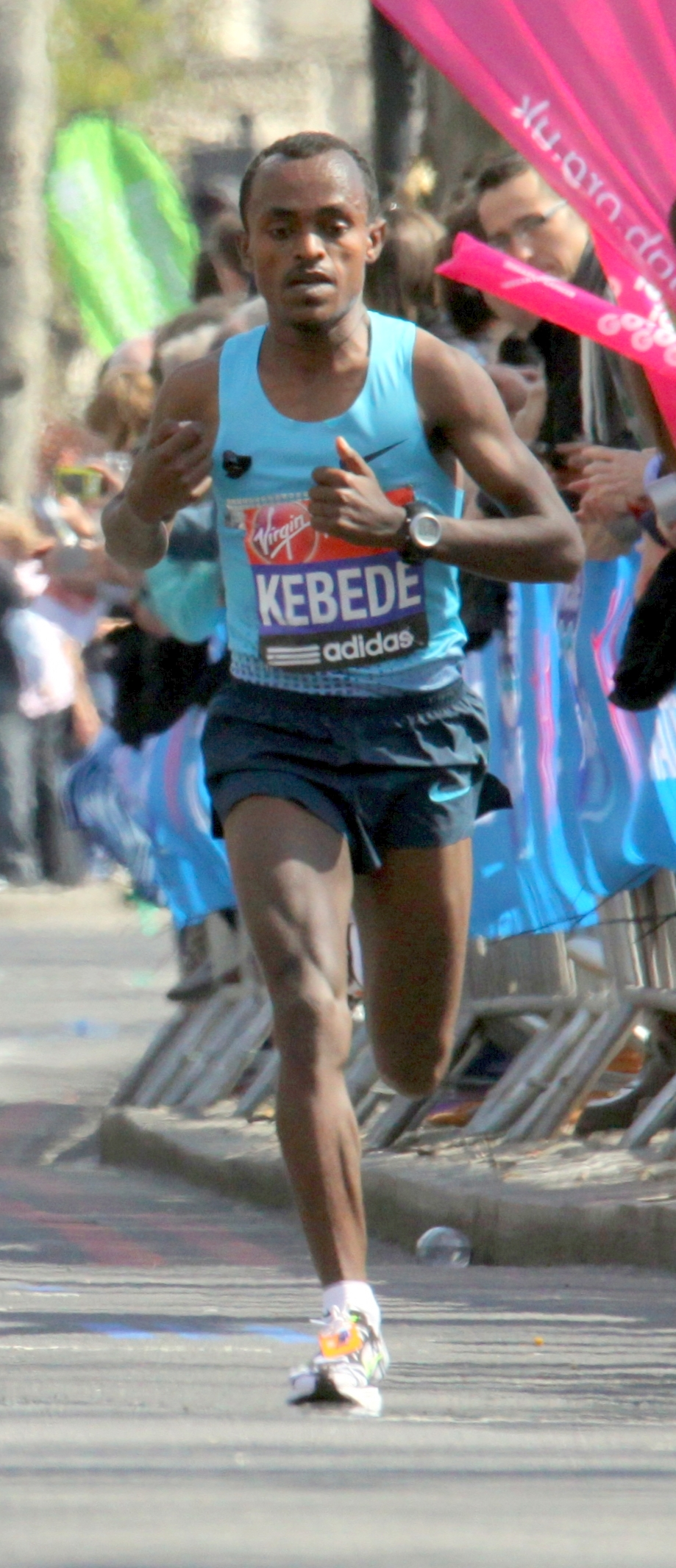
Tsegaye Kebede, 2013 London Marathon

He attempted to defend his title in the 2011 London Marathon, but could not keep up with the leaders' pace at the 30 km mark, and had to settle for fifth place with a time of 2:07:47. He was not chosen for the Ethiopian 2012 London Olympics marathon team despite the pleas of Haile Gebrselassie to their country's selection committee. At the Great Manchester Run in May he came runner-up to Gebrselassie but ran a personal best of 27:56 minutes. He entered the 2012 Chicago Marathon and went one better than his 2010 performance to win the race. He gradually pulled ahead of the pack in the second half of the race and managed a course record time of 2:04:38, also a personal best.

In April 2013, Kebede beat "the world's best marathon field" by 29 seconds to win the London Marathon in 2:06:04. At 21.7 miles (35 km), he trailed the race's eventual second-place finisher and course record holder Emmanuel Mutai of Kenya by 43 seconds, slowed by a pain in his side. The Independent described Kebede as a "pocket-battleship clad in a blue vest – a runner with a boxer's stance" and called his race finish "devastating".

== Personal bests ==
Updated 7 October 2012

| Event | Time (h:m:s) | Date | Location |
|---|---|---|---|
| 10 kilometres | 27:56 | 20 May 2012 | Manchester, UK |
| Half marathon | 59:35 | 8 February 2008 | Ras Al Khaimah, United Arab Emirates |
| 25 kilometres | 1:14:43 | 24 August 2009 | Beijing, China |
| 30 kilometres | 1:30:25 | 21 October 2007 | Amsterdam, Netherlands |
| Marathon | 2:04:38 | 7 October 2012 | Chicago, United States |

All Information taken from IAAF profile.

== Major competition record ==
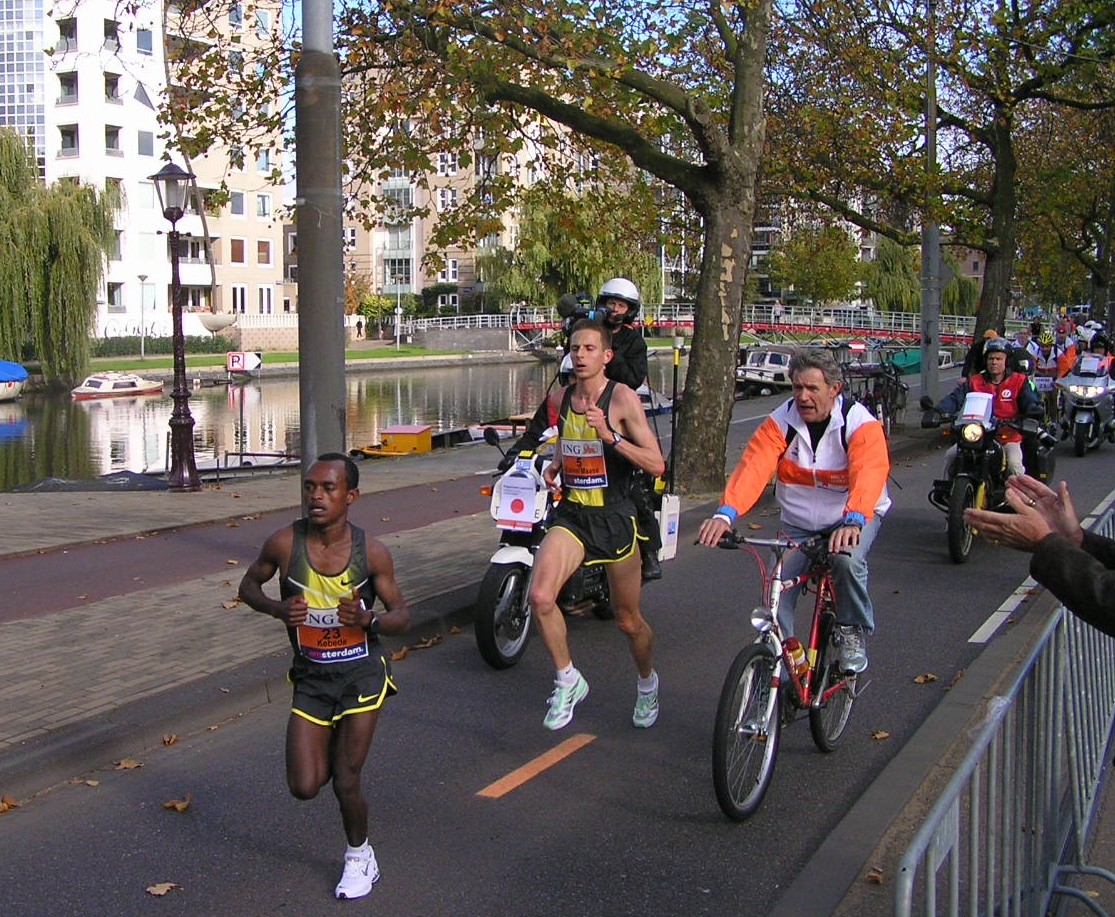
Kebede ahead of Kamiel Maase at the 2007 Amsterdam Marathon

- All results regarding marathon, unless stated otherwise

| Year | Competition | Venue | Position | Notes |
Representing Ethiopia
| 2007 | Amsterdam Marathon | Amsterdam, Netherlands | 8th | 2:08:16 |
| 2008 | Paris Marathon | Paris, France | 1st | 2:06:40 |
| 2008 | Summer Olympics | Beijing, China | 3rd | 2:10:00 |
| 2008 | Fukuoka Marathon | Fukuoka, Japan | 1st | 2:06:10 |
| 2009 | London Marathon | London, United Kingdom | 2nd | 2:05:20 |
| 2009 | World Championships | Berlin, Germany | 3rd | 2:08:35 |
| 2009 | Fukuoka Marathon | Fukuoka, Japan | 1st | 2:05:18 |
| 2010 | London Marathon | London, United Kingdom | 1st | 2:05:19 |
| 2010 | Chicago Marathon | Chicago, Illinois | 2nd | 2:06:43 |
| 2011 | ING New York City Marathon | New York, NY | 3rd | 2:07:13 |
| 2012 | London Marathon | London, United Kingdom | 3rd | 2:06:52 |
| 2012 | Chicago Marathon | Chicago, Illinois | 1st | 2:04:38 |
| 2013 | London Marathon | London, United Kingdom | 1st | 2:06:04 |
| 2013 | World Championships | Moscow, Russia | 4th | 2:10:47 |
| 2013 | ING New York City Marathon | New York, NY | 2nd | 2:09:16 |
| 2014 | London Marathon | London, United Kingdom | 3rd | 2:06:30 |
| 2014 | Berlin Marathon | Berlin, Germany | 3rd | 2:10:27 |
| 2016 | Rotterdam Marathon | Rotterdam, Netherlands | 5th | 2:10:56 |
| 2017 | Tokyo Marathon | Tokyo, Japan | 9th | 2:08:45 |
| 2017 | Hamburg Marathon | Hamburg, Germany | 6th | 2:12:31 |
| 2018 | Barcelona Marathon | Barcelona, Spain | 5th | 2:09:25 |
| 2018 | Valencia Marathon | Valencia, Spain | 4th | 2:05:21 |
| 2019 | Valencia Marathon | Valencia, Spain | 12th | 2:07:54 |

=== Other competitions ===
- 2nd – 2008 Ras Al Khaimah Half Marathon, 59:35
- 3rd – 2008 World 10K Bangalore, 28:10
- 1st – 2008 Great North Run, 59:45
