= Sarah Piercy =

British wheelchair athlete (born 1980)

Sarah Piercy (born c. 1980) is a British wheelchair athlete with a rare condition called arthrogryposis multiplex congenita.

At the age of 19 and in her first attempt at the race, she won the 2000 London Marathon women's wheelchair competition after a tire puncture slowed defending champion Tanni Grey-Thompson. She has competed in a further seven London Marathons. Wanting to beat her Millennium winning personal time in the 2012 Olympic year, she was only one minute and six seconds behind beating her personal best time of 2.23.30. Piercy has been seeking to compete in the equestrian events in the Paralympics as well. In February, 2009, a local online newspaper noted that her equestrian ambitions were being stymied because local riding stables would not allow her to ride their horses due to concerns related to safety regulations and due to being only able to ride side saddle due to her hips. Piercy Bristol half in 2009.
