= Athletics at the 2012 Summer Olympics – Qualification =

For the athletics competitions at the 2012 Summer Olympics the following qualification systems were in place. The list has been updated to 30 June 2012. Qualification ended on 8 July 2012.

== Qualifying standards ==
A National Olympic Committee (NOC) may enter up to 3 qualified athletes in each individual event if all athletes meet the A standard, or 1 athlete per event if they meet the B standard. An NOC may also enter a maximum of 1 qualified relay team per event. NOCs may enter athletes regardless of time (1 athlete per sex) if they have no athletes meeting the qualifying A or B standards. This makes it possible for every nation to have a minimum of two representatives in the sport.

The qualifying time standards may be obtained in various meets during the qualifying period that have the approval of the IAAF. All approved outdoor meets and indoor meets with the exception of 100 m, 200 m and 110/100 m hurdles races are eligible. The qualifying period for the 10,000 m, marathon, walks and combined events is from 1 January 2011 to 8 July 2012; for all other individual events it is 1 May 2011 to 8 July 2012. Relay qualification is between 1 January 2011 to 2 July 2012.

In addition to the qualifying standards below, marathon runners finishing in the top 20 of the 2011 World Championships or in the top 10 of any IAAF gold series marathon within the qualification period are also treated as having earned the A standard.

The NOCs were still allowed to select participants using their own rules, on the condition all athletes have made the qualifying time. For example, the United States selected athletes based on the result of the 2012 United States Olympic Trials event. Sweden only entered athletes good enough to reach at least 8th position, based on an assessment by the Swedish NOC.

The IAAF Qualifying Standards are as follows:

Men's events			Women's events		
Event	Men's A	Men's B	Event	Women's A	Women's B
Men's 100 metres	10.18	10.24	Women's 100 metres	11.29	11.38
Men's 200 metres	20.55	20.65	Women's 200 metres	23.10	23.30
Men's 400 metres	45.30	45.90	Women's 400 metres	51.55	52.35
Men's 800 metres	1:45.60	1:46.30	Women's 800 metres	1:59.90	2:01.30
Men's 1500 metres	3:35.50	3:38.00	Women's 1500 metres	4:06.00	4:08.90
Men's 5000 metres	13:20.00	13:27.00	Women's 5000 metres	15:20.00	15:30.00
Men's 10,000 metres	27:45.00	28:05.00	Women's 10,000 metres	31:45.00	32:10.00
Men's marathon	2:15:00	2:18:00	Women's marathon	2:37:00	2:43:00
Men's 3000 steeplechase	8:23.10	8:32.00	Women's 3000 steeplechase	9:43.00	9:48.00
Men's 110 metres hurdles	13.52	13.60	Women's 100 metres hurdles	12.96	13.15
Men's 400 metres hurdles	49.50	49.80	Women's 400 metres hurdles	55.50	56.65
Men's high jump	2.31	2.28	Women's high jump	1.95	1.92
Men's pole vault	5.72	5.60	Women's pole vault	4.50	4.40
Men's long jump	8.20	8.10	Women's long jump	6.75	6.65
Men's triple jump	17.20	16.85	Women's triple jump	14.30	14.10
Men's shot put	20.50	20.00	Women's shot put	18.30	17.20
Men's discus throw	65.00	63.00	Women's discus throw	62.00	59.50
Men's hammer throw	78.00	74.00	Women's hammer throw	71.50	69.00
Men's javelin throw	82.00	79.50	Women's javelin throw	61.00	59.00
Men's decathlon	8200	7950	Women's heptathlon	6150	5950
Men's 20 kilometres walk	1:22:30	1:24:30	Women's 20 kilometres walk	1:33:30	1:38:00
Men's 50 kilometres walk	3:59:00	4:09:00	–	–	–
Men's 4 × 100 metres relay	Top 16 teams		Women's 4 × 100 metres relay	Top 16 teams	
Men's 4 × 400 metres relay	Top 16 teams		Women's 4 × 400 metres relay	Top 16 teams	

== Men's events ==
=== Men's 100 m ===
Qualification standard	No. of athletes	NOC	Nominated athletes
A standard – 10.18	3	Jamaica	Yohan Blake; Usain Bolt; Asafa Powell
A standard – 10.18	3	Saint Kitts and Nevis	Kim Collins; Antoine Adams; Jason Rogers
A standard – 10.18	3	Trinidad and Tobago	Keston Bledman; Richard Thompson; Rondel Sorrillo
A standard – 10.18	3	Great Britain	Dwain Chambers; James Dasaolu; Adam Gemili
A standard – 10.18	3	Nigeria	Ogho-Oghene Egwero; Obinna Metu; Peter Emelieze
A standard – 10.18	3	United States	Justin Gatlin; Tyson Gay; Ryan Bailey
A standard – 10.18	2	Bahamas	Derrick Atkins; Warren Fraser
A standard – 10.18	1*	France	~~Christophe Lemaitre~~; Jimmy Vicaut
A standard – 10.18	2	Japan	Masashi Eriguchi; Ryota Yamagata
A standard – 10.18	1	Brazil	Nilson André
A standard – 10.18	1	Canada	Justyn Warner
A standard – 10.18	1	Antigua and Barbuda	Daniel Bailey
A standard – 10.18	1	Barbados	Ramon Gittens
A standard – 10.18	1	Cameroon	Idrissa Adam
A standard – 10.18	1	Cayman Islands	Kemar Hyman
A standard – 10.18	1	China	Su Bingtian
A standard – 10.18	1	Egypt	Amr Ibrahim Mostafa Seoud
A standard – 10.18	1	Latvia	Ronalds Arājs
A standard – 10.18	1	Lithuania	Rytis Sakalauskas
A standard – 10.18	1	Morocco	Aziz Ouhadi
A standard – 10.18	1	Netherlands	Churandy Martina
A standard – 10.18	1	Norway	Jaysuma Saidy Ndure
A standard – 10.18	1	Oman	Barakat Mubarak Al-Harthi
A standard – 10.18	1	Poland	Dariusz Kuc
A standard – 10.18	1	Spain	Ángel David Rodríguez
A standard – 10.18	1	Zambia	Gerald Phiri
A standard – 10.18	0*	Zimbabwe	~~Ngonidzashe Makusha~~ (injured)
B standard – 10.24	1	Colombia	Isidro Montoya
B standard – 10.24	1	Ivory Coast	Ben Youssef Meité
B standard – 10.24	1	Dominican Republic	Carlos Jorge
B standard – 10.24	1	Estonia	Marek Niit
B standard – 10.24	1	The Gambia	Suwaibou Sanneh
B standard – 10.24	1	Grenada	Paul Williams
B standard – 10.24	1	Guyana	Jeremy Bascom
B standard – 10.24	1	Ireland	Jason Smyth
B standard – 10.24	1	Iran	Reza Ghasemi
B standard – 10.24	1	Puerto Rico	Miguel López
B standard – 10.24	1	Panama	Alonso Edward
Universality places	1	American Samoa	Elama Fa’atonu
Universality places	1	Bolivia	Bruno Rojas
Universality places	1	Cook Islands	Patrick Tuara
Universality places	1	Federated States of Micronesia	John Howard
Universality places	1	Tuvalu	Tavevele Noa
Universality places	1	Marshall Islands	Timi Garstang
Universality places	1	Malta	Rachid Chouhal
Universality places	1	Pakistan	Liaquat Ali
Universality places	1	Swaziland	Sibusiso Matsenjwa
Universality places	1	Afghanistan	Massoud Azizi
Universality places	1	Laos	Kilakone Siphonexay
Universality places	1	Singapore	Yeo Foo Ee Gary
Universality places	1	Solomon Islands	Chris Meke Walasi
Universality places	1	Saint Vincent and the Grenadines	Courtney Carl Williams
Universality places	1	Kiribati	Nooa Takooa
Universality places	1	Nepal	Tilak Ram Tharu
Universality places	1	Central African Republic	Berenger Aymard Bosse
Universality places	1	Guinea-Bissau	Holder da Silva
Universality places	1	Mauritius	Fabrice Coiffic
Universality places	1	British Virgin Islands	J'maal Alexander
Universality places	1	Maldives	Azneem Ahmed
Universality places	1	Bangladesh	Mohan Khan
Universality places	1	Republic of the Congo	Devilert Arsene Kimbembe
Universality places	1	Burkina Faso	Gerard Kobeane
Universality places	1	Chad	Abdouraim Haroun
Universality places	1	Indonesia	Fernando Lumain
Universality places	1	São Tomé and Príncipe	Christopher Lima da Costa
Universality places	1	Tonga	Joseph Andy Lui
Universality places	1	Suriname	Jurgen Themen
Universality places	1	Palau	Rodman Teltull
Total	85		

=== Men's 200 m ===
Qualification standard	No. of athletes	NOC	Nominated athletes
A standard – 20.55	3	Brazil	Bruno de Barros; Aldemir Gomes; Sandro Viana
A standard – 20.55	3	Canada	Jared Connaughton; Aaron Brown; Tremaine Harris
A standard – 20.55	3	Jamaica	Yohan Blake; Usain Bolt; Warren Weir
A standard – 20.55	3	Japan	Kei Takase; Shota Iizuka; Shinji Takahira
A standard – 20.55	3	United States	Wallace Spearmon; Maurice Mitchell; Isiah Young
A standard – 20.55	2	Bahamas	Warren Fraser; Michael Mathieu
A standard – 20.55	2	Cuba	Roberto Skyers; Michael Herrera
A standard – 20.55	2	Saint Kitts and Nevis	Kim Collins; Antoine Adams
A standard – 20.55	2	Switzerland	Reto Schenkel; Alex Wilson
A standard – 20.55	2	Great Britain	James Ellington; Christian Malcolm
A standard – 20.55	1	Belgium	Jonathan Borlée
A standard – 20.55	1	China	Xie Zhenye
A standard – 20.55	1	Ecuador	Álex Quiñónez
A standard – 20.55	1	Egypt	Amr Ibrahim Mostafa Seoud
A standard – 20.55	1	Estonia	Marek Niit
A standard – 20.55	1	Finland	Jonathan Åstrand
A standard – 20.55	1	France	Christophe Lemaitre
A standard – 20.55	1	Greece	Lykourgos-Stefanos Tsakonas
A standard – 20.55	1	Ireland	Paul Hession
A standard – 20.55	0*	Italy	~~Andrew Howe~~ (not selected)
A standard – 20.55	1	Morocco	Aziz Ouhadi
A standard – 20.55	1	Netherlands	Churandy Martina
A standard – 20.55	1	Norway	Jaysuma Saidy Ndure
A standard – 20.55	1	Panama	Alonso Edward
A standard – 20.55	1	South Africa	Anaso Jobodwana
A standard – 20.55	1	Trinidad and Tobago	Rondel Sorrillo
A standard – 20.55	1	Ukraine	Serhiy Smelyk
B standard – 20.65	1	Antigua and Barbuda	Brendan Christian
B standard – 20.65	1	Chile	Cristián Reyes
B standard – 20.65	1	Ivory Coast	Ben Youssef Meité
B standard – 20.65	1	Czech Republic	Pavel Maslák
B standard – 20.65	1	Dominican Republic	Carlos Jorge
B standard – 20.65	1	Grenada	Joel Redhead
B standard – 20.65	1	Kazakhstan	Vyacheslav Muravyev
B standard – 20.65	1	Lesotho	Mosito Lehata
B standard – 20.65	1	Mexico	José Carlos Herrera
B standard – 20.65	1	Portugal	Arnaldo Abrantes
Wildcard places	1	Mauritania	Jidou El Moctar
Wildcard places	1	Seychelles	Jean-Yves Esparon
Wildcard places	1	Sierra Leone	Ibrahim Turay
Wildcard places	1	Swaziland	Sibusiso Matsenjwa
Total	58		

=== Men's 400 m ===
Qualification standard	No. of athletes	NOC	Nominated athletes
A standard – 45.30	3	Bahamas	Chris Brown; Ramon Miller; Demetrius Pinder
A standard – 45.30	3	Great Britain	Nigel Levine; Martyn Rooney; Conrad Williams
A standard – 45.30	3	United States	LaShawn Merritt; Tony McQuay; Bryshon Nellum
A standard – 45.30	2	Belgium	Jonathan Borlee; Kevin Borlee
A standard – 45.30	2	Grenada	Rondell Bartholomew; Kirani James
A standard – 45.30	3	Jamaica	Dane Hyatt; Rusheen McDonald; Jermaine Gonzales
A standard – 45.30	2	Russia	Maksim Dyldin; Pavel Trenikhin
A standard – 45.30	2	Trinidad and Tobago	Renny Quow; Deon Lendore
A standard – 45.30	1	Botswana	Isaac Makwala
A standard – 45.30	1	Costa Rica	Nery Brenes
A standard – 45.30	1	Cuba	Williams Collazo
A standard – 45.30	1	Czech Republic	Pavel Maslák
A standard – 45.30	1	Dominican Republic	Luguelín Santos
A standard – 45.30	1	Japan	Yuzo Kanemaru
A standard – 45.30	1	Poland	Marcin Marciniszyn
A standard – 45.30	1	South Africa	Oscar Pistorius
A standard – 45.30	1	Sudan	Rabah Yousif
A standard – 45.30	1	Virgin Islands	Tabarie Henry
B standard – 45.90	1	Australia	Steven Solomon
B standard – 45.90	1	Benin	Mathieu Gnanligo
B standard – 45.90	0*	Brazil	~~Anderson Henriques~~
B standard – 45.90	1	Canada	Daundre Barnaby
B standard – 45.90	1	Colombia	Diego Palomeque
B standard – 45.90	1	Dominica	Erison Hurtault
B standard – 45.90	1	Ethiopia	Bereket Desta
B standard – 45.90	0*	Germany	~~Thomas Schneider~~
B standard – 45.90	1	Guyana	Winston George
B standard – 45.90	1	Hungary	Marcell Deák Nagy
B standard – 45.90	1	Independent Olympic Athletes	Liemarvin Bonevacia
B standard – 45.90	1	Iran	Sajjad Hashemi
B standard – 45.90	1	Israel	Donald Sanford
B standard – 45.90	0*	Italy	~~Marco Vistalli~~ (not selected)
B standard – 45.90	1	Kazakhstan	Sergey Zaikov
B standard – 45.90	0*	Kenya	
B standard – 45.90	1	Latvia	Jānis Leitis
B standard – 45.90	0*	Netherlands	~~Liemarvin Bonevacia~~
B standard – 45.90	0*	~~Nigeria~~	
B standard – 45.90	1	Oman	Ahmed Mohamed Al-Merjabi
B standard – 45.90	0*	Qatar	~~Femi Ogunode~~ (banned)
B standard – 45.90	1	Saudi Arabia	Yousef Masrahi
B standard – 45.90	0*	Sweden	~~Johan Wissman~~
B standard – 45.90	1	Ukraine	Vitaliy Butrym
B standard – 45.90	0*	~~Venezuela~~	
Universality places	1	Brunei	Ak Hafiy Tajuddin Rositi
Universality places	1	Macedonia	Kristijan Efremov
Universality places	1	Myanmar	Zaw Win Thet
Universality places	1	Palestine	Bahaa Al Farra
Universality places	1	Papua New Guinea	Nelson Stone
Universality places	1	Paraguay	Augusto Stanley
Total	52		

=== Men's 800 m ===
Qualification standard	No. of athletes	NOC	Nominated athletes
A standard – 1:45.60	3	Brazil	Kléberson Davide; Fabiano Peçanha
A standard – 1:45.60	3	Great Britain	Andrew Osagie; Michael Rimmer; Gareth Warburton
A standard – 1:45.60	3	Kenya	David Rudisha; Timothy Kitum; Anthony Chemut
A standard – 1:45.60	2*	Poland	Adam Kszczot; Marcin Lewandowski
A standard – 1:45.60	3	Spain	Kevin López; Luis Alberto Marco; Antonio Manuel Reina
A standard – 1:45.60	3	United States	Khadevis Robinson; Duane Solomon; Nicholas Symmonds
A standard – 1:45.60	2	Cuba	Maury Castillo; Andy González
A standard – 1:45.60	2	France	Pierre-Ambroise Bosse; Jeff Lastennet
A standard – 1:45.60	2	Morocco	Amine Laâlou; Amine El Manaoui
A standard – 1:45.60	2	Russia	Yuriy Borzakovskiy; Ivan Tukhtachev
A standard – 1:45.60	2	South Africa	Mbulaeni Mulaudzi; André Olivier
A standard – 1:45.60	2	Sudan	Abubaker Kaki; Ismail Ahmed Ismail
A standard – 1:45.60	1	Australia	Jeffrey Riseley
A standard – 1:45.60	1	Belarus	Anis Ananenka
A standard – 1:45.60	1	Botswana	Nijel Amos
A standard – 1:45.60	1	Canada	Geoffrey Harris
A standard – 1:45.60	1	Colombia	Rafith Rodriguez
A standard – 1:45.60	1	Czech Republic	Jakub Holuša
A standard – 1:45.60	1	Denmark	Andreas Bube
A standard – 1:45.60	1	Egypt	Mohammed Hamad
A standard – 1:45.60	1	Ethiopia	Mohammed Aman
A standard – 1:45.60	1	Germany	Sören Ludolph
A standard – 1:45.60	1	Saudi Arabia	Abdulaziz Mohammed
A standard – 1:45.60	1	Kuwait	Mohammad Al-Azemi
A standard – 1:45.60	1	Netherlands	Robert Lathouwers
A standard – 1:45.60	1	Qatar	Musaab Balah
A standard – 1:45.60	0*	Turkey	~~Ilham Tanui Özbilen~~
B standard – 1:46.30	1	Algeria	Taoufik Makhloufi
B standard – 1:46.30	1	Hungary	Tamás Kazi
B standard – 1:46.30	1	Iran	Sajjad Moradi
B standard – 1:46.30	0*	~~Ireland~~	
B standard – 1:46.30	1	Japan	Masato Yokota
B standard – 1:46.30	1	Puerto Rico	Wesley Vázquez
B standard – 1:46.30	0*	~~Tajikistan~~	
B standard – 1:46.30	1	Uganda	Julius Mutekanga
B standard – 1:46.30	1	Zambia	Prince Mumba
Universality	1	Angola	Manuel Antonio
Universality	1	Equatorial Guinea	Benjamín Enzema
Universality	1	Guam	Derek Mandell
Universality	1	Kyrgyzstan	Erzhan Askarov
Universality	1	Mali	Moussa Camarao
Universality	1	Monaco	Brice Etes
Universality	1	Nicaragua	Edgar Cortez
Universality	1	Vanuatu	Arnold Sorina
Total	57		

=== Men's 1500 m ===
Qualification standard	No. of athletes	NOC	Nominated athletes
A standard – 3:35.50	3	Ethiopia	Mekonnen Gebremedhin; Dawit Wolde; Teshome Dirirsa
A standard – 3:35.50	3	France	Jamale Aarrass; Florian Carvalho; Yoann Kowal
A standard – 3:35.50	3	Kenya	Silas Kiplagat; Nixon Chepseba; Asbel Kiprop
A standard – 3:35.50	3	Morocco	Abdalaati Iguider; Amine Laâlou; Mohamed Moustaoui
A standard – 3:35.50	3	Spain	David Bustos; Álvaro Rodríguez; Diego Ruiz
A standard – 3:35.50	3	United States	Leonel Manzano; Matthew Centrowitz Jr. Andrew Wheating
A standard – 3:35.50	2	Australia	Ryan Gregson; Jeff Riseley
A standard – 3:35.50	2	Great Britain	Ross Murray; Andrew Baddeley
A standard – 3:35.50	2	Qatar	Mohammed Al-Qarni; Hamza Driouch
A standard – 3:35.50	2	Saudi Arabia	Emad Noor; Mohammed Shaween
A standard – 3:35.50	1*	Algeria	Taoufik Makhloufi
A standard – 3:35.50	1	Bahrain	Belal Mansoor Ali
A standard – 3:35.50	1	Canada	Nathan Brannen
A standard – 3:35.50	0*	Cuba	~~Maury S. Castillo~~
A standard – 3:35.50	1	Djibouti	Ayanleh Souleiman
A standard – 3:35.50	1	Germany	Carsten Schlangen
A standard – 3:35.50	1	Ireland	Ciarán O'Lionaird
A standard – 3:35.50	1	New Zealand	Nicholas Willis
A standard – 3:35.50	0*	Poland	
A standard – 3:35.50	0*	South Africa	~~Johan Cronje~~
A standard – 3:35.50	1	Sudan	Abubaker Kaki
A standard – 3:35.50	1	Turkey	İlham Tanui Özbilen
B standard – 3:38.00	1	Austria	Andreas Vojta
B standard – 3:38.00	1	Eritrea	Teklit Teweldebrhan
B standard – 3:38.00	1	Italy	~~Merihun Crespi~~ (not selected)
B standard – 3:38.00	1	Latvia	Dmitrijs Jurkevics
B standard – 3:38.00	1	Norway	Henrik Ingebrigtsen
B standard – 3:38.00	1	Russia	Yegor Nikolayev
B standard – 3:38.00	1	Uganda	Jacob Araptany
B standard – 3:38.00	1	Venezuela	Edward Villanueva
B standard – 3:38.00	1	Somalia	Mohamed Hassan Mohamed
Total	47		

=== Men's 5000 m ===
Qualification standard	No. of athletes	NOC	Nominated athletes
A standard – 13:20.00	3	Australia	Collis Birmingham; Craig Mottram; David McNeill
A standard – 13:20.00	3	Eritrea	Abrar Osman Adem; Teklemariam Medhin; Amanuel Mesel
A standard – 13:20.00	3	Ethiopia	Dejen Gebremeskel; Hagos Gebrhiwet; Yenew Alamirew
A standard – 13:20.00	3	Great Britain	Mo Farah; Nick McCormick
A standard – 13:20.00	3	Kenya	Isiah Koech; Edwin Soi; Thomas Longosiwa
A standard – 13:20.00	3	Saudi Arabia	Moukheld Al-Outaibi; Abdullah Abdulaziz Aljoud; Hussain Jamaan Alhamdah
A standard – 13:20.00	3	Morocco	Soufiyan Bouqantar; Abdalaati Iguider; Aziz Lahbabi
A standard – 13:20.00	3	Uganda	Abraham Kiplimo; Moses Ndiema Kipsiro; Geoffrey Kusuro
A standard – 13:20.00	3	United States	Bernard Lagat; Lopez Lomong; Galen Rupp
A standard – 13:20.00	2	Algeria	Rabah Aboud; Mounir Miout
A standard – 13:20.00	2	Spain	Jesús España; Francisco Javier Alves
A standard – 13:20.00	1	Bahrain	Bilisuma Shugi
A standard – 13:20.00	1	Italy	Daniele Meucci
A standard – 13:20.00	1	Canada	Cameron Levins
A standard – 13:20.00	1	Djibouti	Mumin Gala
A standard – 13:20.00	1	France	Yohan Durand
A standard – 13:20.00	1	Germany	Arne Gabius
A standard – 13:20.00	1	Ireland	Alistair Ian Cragg
A standard – 13:20.00	1	Mexico	Juan Luis Barrios
A standard – 13:20.00	0*	New Zealand	~~Adrian Blincoe~~ (injured)
A standard – 13:20.00	0	Somalia	
A standard – 13:20.00	1	Turkey	Polat Kemboi Arıkan
B standard – 13:27.00	1	Argentina	Javier Carriqueo
B standard – 13:27.00	1	Azerbaijan	Hayle Ibrahimov
B standard – 13:27.00	1	Japan	Hitomi Niiya
B standard – 13:27.00	1	Portugal	Rui Silva
B standard – 13:27.00	1	Ukraine	Serhiy Lebid
B standard – 13:27.00	1	Zambia	Tonny Wamulwa
Universality	1	Burundi	Olivier Iradukunda
Universality	1	Cape Verde	Ruben Sanca
Total	48		

=== Men's 10,000 m ===
Qualification standard	No. of athletes	NOC	Nominated athletes
A standard – 27:45.00	3	Eritrea	Teklemariam Medhin; Zersenay Tadese; Nguse Tesfaldet
A standard – 27:45.00	3	Ethiopia	Kenenisa Bekele; Tariku Bekele; Gebregziabher Gebremariam
A standard – 27:45.00	3	Kenya	Bitan Karoki; Wilson Kiprop; Moses Masai
A standard – 27:45.00	3	United States	Dathan Ritzenhein; Galen Rupp; Matt Tegenkamp
A standard – 27:45.00	2	Canada	Mohammed Ahmed; Cameron Levins
A standard – 27:45.00	2	Great Britain	Mo Farah; Christopher Thompson
A standard – 27:45.00	2	Mexico	Juan Luis Barrios; Diego Estrada
A standard – 27:45.00	2	Uganda	Thomas Ayeko; Moses Ndiema Kipsiro
A standard – 27:45.00	1	Australia	Ben St. Lawrence
A standard – 27:45.00	1	Bahrain	Ali Hasan Mahboob
A standard – 27:45.00	1	Ecuador	Byron Piedra
A standard – 27:45.00	0*	France	~~Bouabdellah Tahri~~
A standard – 27:45.00	1	Italy	Daniele Meucci
A standard – 27:45.00	1	Japan	Yuki Sato
A standard – 27:45.00	0*	South Africa	~~Stephen Mokoka~~
B standard – 28:05.00	0*	~~Morocco~~	
B standard – 28:05.00	1	Portugal	Rui Silva
B standard – 28:05.00	1	Rwanda	Robert Kajuga
B standard – 28:05.00	1	Spain	Ayad Lamdassem
B standard – 28:05.00	1	Turkey	Polat Kemboi Arıkan
B standard – 28:05.00	1	Ukraine	Mykola Labovskyy
Total	31		

=== Men's marathon ===
Qualification standard	No. of athletes	NOC	Qualified athletes
A standard – 2:15:00	3	Australia	Martin Dent; Jeffrey Hunt; Michael Shelley
A standard – 2:15:00	3	Brazil	Marílson Gomes dos Santos; Paulo Roberto Paula; Franck de Almeida
A standard – 2:15:00	3	Canada	Reid Coolsaet; Eric Gillis; Dylan Wykes
A standard – 2:15:00	3	Eritrea	Yared Asmerom; Yonas Kifle; Samuel Tsegay
A standard – 2:15:00	3	Ethiopia	Ayele Abshero; Dino Sefir; Getu Feleke
A standard – 2:15:00	3	France	Abraham Kiprotich; Abdellatif Meftah; Patrick Tambwé
A standard – 2:15:00	1*	Italy	Ruggero Pertile
A standard – 2:15:00	3	Japan	Arata Fujiwara; Kentaro Nakamoto; Ryo Yamamoto
A standard – 2:15:00	3	Kenya	Wilson Kipsang; Abel Kirui; Emmanuel Mutai
A standard – 2:15:00	3	South Korea	Jang Shin-Gwan; Jeong Jin-Hyeok; Lee Doo-Hang
A standard – 2:15:00	3	Mexico	Carlos Cordero; Daniel Vargas; Arturo Malaquias
A standard – 2:15:00	3	Morocco	Adil Annani; Abderrahime Bouramdane; Rachid Kisri
A standard – 2:15:00	2*	Poland	Henryk Szost; Marcin Chabowski
A standard – 2:15:00	1*	Portugal	Rui Pedro Silva
A standard – 2:15:00	1*	Qatar	Mohammed Bakheet
A standard – 2:15:00	3	Russia	Dmitriy Safronov; Aleksey Reunkov; Grigoriy Andreyev
A standard – 2:15:00	3	Spain	Ignacio Cáceres; Carles Castillejo; José Carlos Hernández
A standard – 2:15:00	3	South Africa	Lusapho April; Stephen Mokoka; Coolboy Ngamole
A standard – 2:15:00	3	Tanzania	Mohamed Ikoki Msandeki; Faustin Musa; Samson Ramadhani
A standard – 2:15:00	1*	Uganda	Stephen Kiprotich
A standard – 2:15:00	3	Ukraine	Ivan Babaryka; Vitaliy Shafar; Oleksandr Sitkovskyy
A standard – 2:15:00	3	United States	Abdihakem Abdirahman; Meb Keflezighi; Ryan Hall
A standard – 2:15:00	3	Great Britain	Scott Overall; Dave Webb; Lee Merrien
A standard – 2:15:00	2	China	Dong Guojian; Li Zicheng
A standard – 2:15:00	2	Moldova	Iaroslav Musinshi; Roman Prodius
A standard – 2:15:00	1*	Mongolia	Ser-Od Bat-Ochir; ~~Tseveenravdan Byambajav~~
A standard – 2:15:00	0*	Netherlands	~~Michel Butter~~; ~~Koen Raymaekers~~
A standard – 2:15:00	1*	North Korea	Pak Song-Chol; ~~Kim Gwang Hyok~~
A standard – 2:15:00	2	Peru	Jhon Lennon Casallo; Raul Pacheco
A standard – 2:15:00	1	Argentina	Miguel Bárzola
A standard – 2:15:00	1	Austria	Günther Weidlinger
A standard – 2:15:00	1	Belarus	Stsiapan Rahautsou
A standard – 2:15:00	1	Bahrain	Aadam Ismaeel Khamis
A standard – 2:15:00	1	Hungary	Tamás Kovács
A standard – 2:15:00	1	Independent Olympic Athletes	Guor Marial
A standard – 2:15:00	1	Ireland	Mark Kenneally
A standard – 2:15:00	1	Israel	Zohar Zemiro
A standard – 2:15:00	1	Norway	Urige Buta
A standard – 2:15:00	1	Romania	Marius Ionescu
A standard – 2:15:00	1	Slovenia	Primož Kobe
A standard – 2:15:00	0*	Sweden	~~Mustafa Mohamed~~ (not selected by Swedish NOC)
A standard – 2:15:00	1	Switzerland	Viktor Rothlin
A standard – 2:15:00	1	Turkey	Bekir Karayel
A standard – 2:15:00	2	Zimbabwe	Cuthbert Nyasango; Wirimai Zhuwawo
B standard – 2:18:00	1	Algeria	Tayeb Filali
B standard – 2:18:00	1	Andorra	Antoni Bernardo
B standard – 2:18:00	0*	Belgium	
B standard – 2:18:00	1	Chinese Taipei	Chang Chia-Che
B standard – 2:18:00	1	Colombia	Juan Carlos Cardona
B standard – 2:18:00	1	Costa Rica	César Lizano
B standard – 2:18:00	1	Czech Republic	Jan Kreisinger
B standard – 2:18:00	1	Denmark	Jesper Faurschou
B standard – 2:18:00	1	Ecuador	Miguel Almachi
B standard – 2:18:00	1	Finland	Jussi Utriainen
B standard – 2:18:00	0*	Germany	
B standard – 2:18:00	1	Greece	Konstantinos Poulios
B standard – 2:18:00	1	Guatemala	José Amado García
B standard – 2:18:00	1	Iceland	Kári Steinn Karlsson
B standard – 2:18:00	1	India	Ram Singh Yadav
B standard – 2:18:00	1	Latvia	Valērijs Žolnerovičs
B standard – 2:18:00	1	Lesotho	Jobo Khatoane
B standard – 2:18:00	1	Libya	Ali Mabrouk El Zaidi
B standard – 2:18:00	0*	New Zealand	
B standard – 2:18:00	1	Rwanda	Jean Pierre Mvuyekure
B standard – 2:18:00	1	Serbia	Darko Živanović
B standard – 2:18:00	1	Sri Lanka	Anuradha Cooray
B standard – 2:18:00	1	Tunisia	Wissam Hosni
Universality	1	Democratic Republic of the Congo	Zatara Lunga
Universality	1	Jordan	Methkal Abu Drais
Universality	1	Liechtenstein	Marcel Tschopp
Universality	1	Malawi	Mike Tebulo
Universality	1	Timor-Leste	Augusto Ramos Soares
Total	110		

=== Men's 3000 m steeplechase ===
Qualification standard	No. of athletes	NOC	Nominated athletes
A standard – 8:23.10	3	Ethiopia	Roba Gari; Berhanu Getaneh; Nahom Mesfin
A standard – 8:23.10	3	France	Mahiedine Mekhissi-Benabbad; ~~Nordine Gezzar~~ (suspended)
A standard – 8:23.10	3	Kenya	Brimin Kipruto; Ezekiel Kemboi; Abel Mutai
A standard – 8:23.10	3	Morocco	Hamid Ezzine; Hicham Sigueni; Brahim Taleb
A standard – 8:23.10	3	Spain	Víctor García; Abdelaziz Merzougui; Ángel Mullera
A standard – 8:23.10	3	United States	Evan Jager; Donald Cabral; Kyle Alcorn
A standard – 8:23.10	2	Uganda	Jacob Araptany; Benjamin Kiplagat
A standard – 8:23.10	1	Australia	Youcef Abdi
A standard – 8:23.10	1	Canada	Alex Genest
A standard – 8:23.10	1	Germany	Steffen Uliczka
A standard – 8:23.10	1	Italy	Yuri Floriani
A standard – 8:23.10	1	Moldova	Ion Luchianov
A standard – 8:23.10	1	Poland	Łukasz Parszczyński
A standard – 8:23.10	1	Portugal	Alberto Paulo
A standard – 8:23.10	1	Russia	Nikolay Chavkin
A standard – 8:23.10	0*	South Africa	~~Ruben Ramolefi~~
A standard – 8:23.10	1	Tunisia	Amor Ben Yahia
A standard – 8:23.10	1	Ukraine	Vadym Slobodenyuk
B standard – 8:32.00	1	Algeria	Mohamed Belabbas
B standard – 8:32.00	1	Eritrea	Weynay Ghebresilasie
B standard – 8:32.00	1	Finland	Jukka Keskisalo
B standard – 8:32.00	1	Great Britain	Stuart Stokes
B standard – 8:32.00	1	Hungary	Albert Minczér
B standard – 8:32.00	1	Kazakhstan	Artem Kosinov
B standard – 8:32.00	0*	Norway	~~Bjørnar Ustad Kristensen~~
B standard – 8:32.00	1	Peru	Mario Bazán
B standard – 8:32.00	0*	Qatar	~~Abubaker Ali Kamal~~
B standard – 8:32.00	1	Saudi Arabia	Ali Ahmed Al-Amri
B standard – 8:32.00	0*	Slovenia	~~Boštjan Buc~~
B standard – 8:32.00	1	Turkey	Tarık Langat Akdağ
B standard – 8:32.00	1	Venezuela	José Peña
Total	45		

=== Men's 110 m hurdles ===
Qualification standard	No. of athletes	NOC	Qualified athletes
A standard – 13.52	3	China	Liu Xiang; Shi Dongpeng; Xie Wenjun
A standard – 13.52	3	France	Garfield Darien; Dimitri Bascou
A standard – 13.52	3	Germany	Erik Balnuweit; Matthias Bühler; Alexander John
A standard – 13.52	3	Great Britain	Andrew Pozzi; Lawrence Clarke; Andy Turner
A standard – 13.52	3	Jamaica	Hansle Parchment; Andrew Riley; Richard Phillips
A standard – 13.52	3	Russia	Sergey Shubenkov; Konstantin Shabanov; Aleksey Dremin
A standard – 13.52	3	United States	Aries Merritt; Jason Richardson; Jeffrey Porter
A standard – 13.52	2	Barbados	Ryan Brathwaite; Shane Brathwaite
A standard – 13.52	2	Cuba	Orlando Ortega; Dayron Robles
A standard – 13.52	1*	Poland	Artur Noga
A standard – 13.52	2	Puerto Rico	Hector Cotto; Enrique Llanos
A standard – 13.52	2	Trinidad and Tobago	Mikel Thomas; Wayne Davis
A standard – 13.52	1	Algeria	Othman Hadj Lazib
A standard – 13.52	1	Cayman Islands	Ronald Forbes
A standard – 13.52	1	Colombia	Paulo Villar
A standard – 13.52	1	Greece	Konstadinos Douvalidis
A standard – 13.52	2	Hungary	Dániel Kiss; Balázs Baji
A standard – 13.52	1	Italy	Emanuele Abate
A standard – 13.52	1	Netherlands	Gregory Sedoc
B standard – 13.60	1	Bahamas	Shamar Sands
B standard – 13.60	1	Belarus	Maksim Lynsha
B standard – 13.60	1	Kuwait	Abdulaziz Al-Mandeel
B standard – 13.60	1	Nigeria	Selim Nurudeen
B standard – 13.60	1	Spain	Jackson Quiñónez
B standard – 13.60	1	Saudi Arabia	Ahmad Al-Molad
B standard – 13.60	1	South Africa	Lehann Fourie
B standard – 13.60	0*	Switzerland	~~Andreas Kundert~~
Universality places	1	Madagascar	Ali Kamé
Total	46		

=== Men's 400 m hurdles ===
Qualification standard	No. of athletes	NOC	Nominated athletes
A standard – 49.50	3	Great Britain	Dai Greene; Jack Green; Rhys Williams
A standard – 49.50	3	Jamaica	Leford Green; Josef Robertson; Roxroy Cato
A standard – 49.50	3	Japan	Takayuki Kishimoto; Akihiko Nakamura; Tetsuya Tateno
A standard – 49.50	3	Puerto Rico	Erick Alejandro; Javier Culson; Jamele Mason Vegas
A standard – 49.50	3	United States	Michael Tinsley; Angelo Taylor; Kerron Clement
A standard – 49.50	2	Australia	Brendan Cole; Tristan Thomas
A standard – 49.50	2	China	Cheng Wen; Li Zhilong
A standard – 49.50	2	Cuba	Omar Cisneros; Amaurys Valle
A standard – 49.50	2	Dominican Republic	Winder Cuevas; Félix Sánchez
A standard – 49.50	2	Germany	~~Georg Fleischhauer~~; Silvio Schirrmeister
A standard – 49.50	2	South Africa	Cornel Fredericks; Louis van Zyl
A standard – 49.50	1	Italy	José Reynaldo Bencosme de Leon
A standard – 49.50	1	Serbia	Emir Bekrić
A standard – 49.50	0*	Brazil	~~Mahau Suguimati~~
A standard – 49.50	1	Kenya	Vincent Kosgei
A standard – 49.50	1	Mozambique	Kurt Couto
A standard – 49.50	1	Nigeria	Amaechi Morton
A standard – 49.50	1	Russia	Vyacheslav Sakayev
A standard – 49.50	1	Senegal	Mamadou Kassé Hann
A standard – 49.50	1	Trinidad and Tobago	Jehue Gordon
A standard – 49.50	1	Ukraine	Stanislav Melnykov
A standard – 49.50	1	Uruguay	Andrés Silva
B standard – 49.80	1	Belgium	Michael Bultheel
B standard – 49.80	1	Belize	Kenneth Medwood
B standard – 49.80	1	Chinese Taipei	Chen Chieh
B standard – 49.80	1	Czech Republic	Josef Prorok
B standard – 49.80	0*	~~France~~	
B standard – 49.80	1	Portugal	Jorge Paula
B standard – 49.80	1	Slovenia	Brent LaRue
Total	44		

=== Men's high jump ===
Qualification standard	No. of athletes	NOC	Nominated athletes
A standard – 2.31	3	Russia	Ivan Ukhov; Andrey Silnov; Aleksandr Shustov
A standard – 2.31	3	Ukraine	Dmytro Dem'yanyuk; Bohdan Bondarenko; Andriy Protsenko
A standard – 2.31	3	United States	Jamie Nieto; Erik Kynard; Jesse Williams
A standard – 2.31	2	Bahamas	Donald Thomas; Trevor Barry
A standard – 2.31	2	Canada	Michael Mason; Derek Drouin
A standard – 2.31	2	Greece	~~Dimitrios Chondrokoukis~~; Konstadinos Baniotis
A standard – 2.31	1	Italy	Gianmarco Tamberi
A standard – 2.31	1	Great Britain	Robert Grabarz
A standard – 2.31	1	China	Zhang Guowei
A standard – 2.31	1	Cyprus	Kyriakos Ioannou
A standard – 2.31	1	Czech Republic	Jaroslav Bába
A standard – 2.31	1	France	Mickael Hanany
A standard – 2.31	1	Lithuania	Raivydas Stanys
A standard – 2.31	1	Qatar	Mutaz Essa Barshim
A standard – 2.31	1	Saint Lucia	Darvin Edwards
A standard – 2.31	1	Slovenia	Rožle Prezelj
A standard – 2.31	1	Slovakia	Michal Kabelka
B standard – 2.28	1	Belarus	Andrei Churyla
B standard – 2.28	1	Brazil	Guilherme Cobbo
B standard – 2.28	1	Bulgaria	Viktor Ninov
B standard – 2.28	1	Colombia	Wanner Miller
B standard – 2.28	1	Cuba	Víctor Moya
B standard – 2.28	1	Ecuador	Diego Ferrín
B standard – 2.28	1	Finland	Osku Torro
B standard – 2.28	1	Romania	~~Marius-Cristian Dumitrache~~?
B standard – 2.28	1	Serbia	Dragutin Topić
B standard – 2.28	1	Syria	Majed Aldin Ghazal
Universality places	1	Malaysia	Lee Hup Wei
Total	36		

=== Men's pole vault ===
Qualification standard	No. of athletes	NOC	Nominated athletes
A standard – 5.72	3	Germany	Raphael Holzdeppe; Malte Mohr; Björn Otto
A standard – 5.72	2*	Poland	~~Pawel Wojciechowski wild card~~ Łukasz Michalski; ~~Mateusz Didenkow~~
A standard – 5.72	3	Russia	Sergey Kucheryanu; Dmitriy Starodubtsev; Yevgeniy Lukyanenko
A standard – 5.72	3	United States	Brad Walker; Jeremy Scott; Derek Miles
A standard – 5.72	2	France	Renaud Lavillenie; Romain Mesnil
A standard – 5.72	2	Ukraine	Denys Yurchenko; Maksym Mazuryk
A standard – 5.72	1	Australia	Steve Hooker
A standard – 5.72	1	Czech Republic	Jan Kudlička
A standard – 5.72	1	Cuba	Lazaro Borges
A standard – 5.72	1	Finland	Jere Bergius
A standard – 5.72	1	Great Britain	Steven Lewis
A standard – 5.72	1	Greece	Konstadinos Filippidis
A standard – 5.72	1	Japan	Daichi Sawano
A standard – 5.72	1	Sweden	Alhaji Jeng
B standard – 5.60	1	Brazil	Fábio da Silva
B standard – 5.60	1	China	Yang Yansheng
B standard – 5.60	1	Croatia	Ivan Horvat
B standard – 5.60	0*	Italy	~~Claudio Stecchi~~
B standard – 5.60	1	Kazakhstan	Nikita Filippov
B standard – 5.60	1	South Korea	Kim Yoo-Suk
B standard – 5.60	1	Latvia	Mareks Ārents
B standard – 5.60	1	Netherlands	Robbert-Jan Jansen
B standard – 5.60	1	Portugal	Edi Maia
B standard – 5.60	1	Spain	Igor Bychkov
Total	34		

=== Men's long jump ===
Qualification standard	No. of athletes	NOC	Nominated athletes
A standard – 8.20	3	China	Li Jinzhe; Su Xiongfeng; Zhang Xiaoyi
A standard – 8.20	3	Germany	Sebastian Bayer; Alyn Camara; Christian Reif
A standard – 8.20	3	Russia	Aleksandr Menkov; Sergey Morgunov; Aleksandr Petrov
A standard – 8.20	3	United States	Marquise Goodwin; George Kitchens; William Claye
A standard – 8.20	2	Australia	Mitchell Watt; Henry Frayne
A standard – 8.20	2	Czech Republic	Roman Novotný; Štěpán Wagner
A standard – 8.20	2	Great Britain	Christopher Tomlinson; Greg Rutherford
A standard – 8.20	2	South Africa	Godfrey Khotso Mokoena; Luvo Manyonga
A standard – 8.20	2	Spain	Eusebio Cáceres; Luis Felipe Méliz
A standard – 8.20	1	Armenia	Armen Sargsyan
A standard – 8.20	1	Brazil	Mauro Vinícius da Silva
A standard – 8.20	1	France	Salim Sdiri
A standard – 8.20	1	Ghana	Ignisious Gaisah
A standard – 8.20	1	Greece	Louis Tsatoumas
A standard – 8.20	1	Jamaica	Damar Forbes
A standard – 8.20	1	Morocco	Yahya Berrabah
A standard – 8.20	1	Mexico	Luis Rivera
A standard – 8.20	1	Nigeria	Stanley Gbagbeke
A standard – 8.20	1	Panama	Irving Saladino
A standard – 8.20	1	Portugal	Marcos Chuva
A standard – 8.20	0*	Zimbabwe	~~Ngonidzashe Makusha~~
B standard – 8.10	1	Bahamas	Raymond Higgs
B standard – 8.10	1	Bermuda	Tyrone Smith
B standard – 8.10	1	Cuba	Wilfredo Martínez
B standard – 8.10	1	Egypt	Mohamed Fathalla Difallah
B standard – 8.10	1	Georgia	Boleslav Skhirtladze
B standard – 8.10	1	Lithuania	Povilas Mykolaitis
B standard – 8.10	0*	Poland	~~Marcin Starzak~~
B standard – 8.10	1	Senegal	Ndiss Kaba Badji
B standard – 8.10	1	Sweden	Michel Tornéus
B standard – 8.10	1	Chinese Taipei	Lin Ching-hsuan
B standard – 8.10	1	Ukraine	Viktor Kuznyetsov
Universality	1	Thailand	Supanara Sukhasvasti
Total	44		

=== Men's triple jump ===
Qualification standard	No. of athletes	NOC	Qualified athletes
A standard – 17.20	3	Cuba	Alexis Copello; Yoandri Betanzos; Arnie David Giralt
A standard – 17.20	2	China	Dong Bin; Cao Shuo
A standard – 17.20	2	France	Benjamin Compaoré
A standard – 17.20	2	Italy	Daniele Greco; Fabrizio Donato
A standard – 17.20	2	Kazakhstan	Roman Valiyev; Yevgeniy Ektov
A standard – 17.20	2	United States	Christian Taylor; William Claye
A standard – 17.20	1	Australia	Henry Frayne
A standard – 17.20	1	Bahamas	Leevan Sands
A standard – 17.20	1	Brazil	Jonathan Henrique Silva
A standard – 17.20	1	Great Britain	Phillips Idowu
A standard – 17.20	1	Nigeria	Tosin Oke
A standard – 17.20	0*	Portugal	~~Nelson Évora~~ (injured)
A standard – 17.20	1	Russia	Lyukman Adams
A standard – 17.20	0*	Sweden	~~Christian Olsson~~ (injured)
A standard – 17.20	1	Ukraine	Sheryf El-Sheryf
B standard – 16.85	1	Algeria	Issam Nima
B standard – 16.85	1	Belarus	~~Aliaksei Tsapik~~; Dzmitry Platnitski
B standard – 16.85	0*	Denmark	~~Anders Møller~~
B standard – 16.85	1	Ecuador	José Adrián Sornoza
B standard – 16.85	1	Haiti	Samyr Lainé
B standard – 16.85	1	India	Renjith Maheshwary
B standard – 16.85	1	South Korea	Kim Deok-hyeon
B standard – 16.85	0*	Poland	~~Karol Hoffmann~~
B standard – 16.85	0*	Romania	~~Marian Oprea~~ (injured)
B standard – 16.85	1	Virgin Islands	Muhammad Halim
Universality	1	United Arab Emirates	Mohammad Abbas
Total	33		

=== Men's shot put ===
Qualification standard	No. of athletes	NOC	Qualified athletes
A standard – 20.50	3	Canada	Dylan Armstrong; Justin Rodhe; Tim Nedow
A standard – 20.50	3	Russia	Maksim Sidorov; Ivan Yushkov; Soslan Tsirikhov
A standard – 20.50	3	United States	Reese Hoffa; Ryan Whiting; Christian Cantwell
A standard – 20.50	2	Belarus	Andrei Mikhnevich; Pavel Lyzhyn
A standard – 20.50	2	Germany	Ralf Bartels; David Storl
A standard – 20.50	1	Jamaica	Dorian Scott
A standard – 20.50	1	Australia	Dale Stevenson
A standard – 20.50	1	Bosnia and Herzegovina	Kemal Mešić
A standard – 20.50	1	Croatia	Nedžad Mulabegović
A standard – 20.50	1	Cuba	Carlos Véliz
A standard – 20.50	1	Czech Republic	Antonín Žalský
A standard – 20.50	1	India	Om Prakash Karhana
A standard – 20.50	1	Latvia	Māris Urtāns
A standard – 20.50	0*	Moldova	~~Ivan Emilianov~~ (suspended)
A standard – 20.50	1	Netherlands	Rutger Smith
A standard – 20.50	1	Poland	Tomasz Majewski
A standard – 20.50	1	Portugal	Marco Fortes
A standard – 20.50	1	Serbia	Asmir Kolasinac
A standard – 20.50	1	Chinese Taipei	Chang Ming-Huang
A standard – 20.50	1	Ukraine	Andriy Semenov
B standard – 20.00	1	Argentina	Germán Lauro
B standard – 20.00	1	Bulgaria	Georgi Ivanov
B standard – 20.00	1	Denmark	Kim Christensen
B standard – 20.00	1	Estonia	Raigo Toompuu
B standard – 20.00	1	Great Britain	Carl Myerscough
B standard – 20.00	1	Greece	Mihaíl Stamatóyiannis
B standard – 20.00	1	Hungary	Lajos Kürthy
B standard – 20.00	1	Mexico	Stephen Saenz
B standard – 20.00	1	Iran	Amin Nikfa
B standard – 20.00	1	Iceland	Odinn Bjorn Thorsteinsson
B standard – 20.00	1	Spain	Borja Vivas
B standard – 20.00	1	Turkey	Hüseyin Atıcı
Universality	1	Albania	Adriatik Hoxha
Total	43		

=== Men's discus throw ===
Qualification standard	No. of athletes	NOC	Qualified athletes
A standard – 65.00	3	Australia	Scott Martin; Benn Harradine; Julian Wruck
A standard – 65.00	3	Estonia	Gerd Kanter; Märt Israel; Aleksander Tammert
A standard – 65.00	3	Great Britain	Lawrence Okoye; Brett Morse; Abdul Buhari
A standard – 65.00	3	Germany	Robert Harting; Markus Münch; Martin Wierig
A standard – 65.00	3	Poland	Piotr Małachowski; Przemysław Czajkowski; Robert Urbanek
A standard – 65.00	3	United States	Lance Brooks; Jarred Rome; Jason Young
A standard – 65.00	2	Croatia	Roland Varga; Martin Marić
A standard – 65.00	2	Cuba	Jorge Fernández; Lois Maikel Martinez
A standard – 65.00	1*	Hungary	~~Róbert Fazekas~~ (disqualified); ~~Zoltán Kővágó~~ (disqualified)
A standard – 65.00	2	Jamaica	Travis Smikle; Jason Morgan
A standard – 65.00	2	Netherlands	Rutger Smith; Eric Cadée
A standard – 65.00	2	Spain	Mario Pestano; Frank Casañas
A standard – 65.00	1	Brazil	Ronald Julião
A standard – 65.00	1	Cyprus	Apostolos Parellis
A standard – 65.00	0*	Czech Republic	~~Jan Marcell~~ (injured)
A standard – 65.00	1	India	Vikas Gowda
A standard – 65.00	1	Iran	Ehsan Hadadi
A standard – 65.00	1	Lithuania	Virgilijus Alekna
A standard – 65.00	1	Sweden	Niklas Arrhenius
A standard – 65.00	0*	~~Italy~~	
A standard – 65.00	1	Russia	Bogdan Pishchalnikov
A standard – 65.00	1	Turkey	Ercüment Olgundeniz
B standard – 63.00	1	Argentina	Germán Lauro
B standard – 63.00	1	Austria	Gerhard Mayer
B standard – 63.00	1	Egypt	Omar El Ghazali
B standard – 63.00	0*	~~Moldova~~	
B standard – 63.00	1	Montenegro	Danijel Furtula
B standard – 63.00	0*	~~Norway~~	
B standard – 63.00	1	Ukraine	Mykyta Nesterenko
Total	44		

=== Men's hammer throw ===
Qualification standard	No. of athletes	NOC	Qualified athletes
A standard – 78.00	3	Belarus	Pavel Kryvitski; Valery Sviatokha; Ivan Tsikhan
A standard – 78.00	3	France	Quentin Bigot; Jérôme Bortoluzzi; Nicolas Figère
A standard – 78.00	3	Russia	Kirill Ikonnikov; Igor Vinichenko; Aleksey Zagornyi
A standard – 78.00	3	Ukraine	Oleksandr Dryhol; Artem Rubanko; Oleksiy Sokyrskyy
A standard – 78.00	2	Italy	Lorenzo Povegliano; Nicola Vizzoni
A standard – 78.00	2	Poland	Szymon Ziółkowski; Paweł Fajdek
A standard – 78.00	2	United States	Kibwe Johnson; AG Kruger
A standard – 78.00	1	Azerbaijan	Dmitriy Marshin
A standard – 78.00	1	Czech Republic	Lukáš Melich
A standard – 78.00	0*	Germany	~~Markus Esser~~
A standard – 78.00	1	Hungary	Krisztián Pars
A standard – 78.00	1	Japan	Koji Murofushi
A standard – 78.00	1	Kuwait	Ali Al-Zinkawi
A standard – 78.00	1	Slovenia	Primoz Kozmus
A standard – 78.00	1	Tajikistan	Dilshod Nazarov
A standard – 78.00	1	Turkey	Eşref Apak
B standard – 74.00	1	Argentina	Juan Ignacio Cerra
B standard – 74.00	1	Canada	James Steacy
B standard – 74.00	1	Croatia	Andras Haklits
B standard – 74.00	1	Cuba	Roberto Janet
B standard – 74.00	1	Cyprus	Constantinos Stathelakos
B standard – 74.00	1	Egypt	Hassan Mohamed
B standard – 74.00	1	Finland	David Söderberg
B standard – 74.00	1	Great Britain	Alex Smith
B standard – 74.00	1	Greece	Alexandros Papadimitriou
B standard – 74.00	1	Iran	Kaveh Mousavi
B standard – 74.00	1	Latvia	Igors Sokolovs
B standard – 74.00	1	Moldova	Serghei Marghiev
B standard – 74.00	1	Norway	Eivind Henriksen
B standard – 74.00	1	Slovakia	Marcel Lomnický
B standard – 74.00	0*	~~South Africa~~	
B standard – 74.00	1	Spain	Javier Cienfuegos
B standard – 74.00	0*	~~Sweden~~	
Universality	1	Turkmenistan	Mergen Mamedov
Total	41		

=== Men's javelin throw ===
Qualification standard	No. of athletes	Qualified athletes	Nominated athletes
A standard – 82.00	3	Czech Republic	Petr Frydrych; Jakub Vadlejch; Vítězslav Veselý
A standard – 82.00	3	Finland	Tero Pitkämäki; Ari Mannio; Antti Ruuskanen
A standard – 82.00	2	Germany	Tino Häber; Matthias de Zordo
A standard – 82.00	3	Latvia	Vadims Vasiļevskis; Zigismunds Sirmais; Ainārs Kovals
A standard – 82.00	3	Poland	Paweł Rakoczy; Bartosz Osewski; Igor Janik
A standard – 82.00	3	Russia	Dmitri Tarabin; Valeriy Iordan; Sergey Makarov
A standard – 82.00	3	Ukraine	Oleksandr Pyatnytsya; Dmytro Kosynskyy; Roman Avramenko
A standard – 82.00	3	United States	Craig Kinsley; Sean Furey; Cyrus Hostetler
A standard – 82.00	2	Greece	Yervasios Filippidis; Spirídon Lebésis
A standard – 82.00	2	Japan	Yukifumi Murakami; Roderick Genki Dean
A standard – 82.00	1	Australia	Jarrod Bannister
A standard – 82.00	1	Canada	Scott Russel
A standard – 82.00	1	Cuba	Guillermo Martinez
A standard – 82.00	1	Great Britain	Mervyn Luckwell
A standard – 82.00	1	South Korea	Sangjin Jung
A standard – 82.00	1	Norway	Andreas Thorkildsen
A standard – 82.00	1	New Zealand	Stuart Farquhar
A standard – 82.00	1	South Africa	John Robert Oosthuizen
A standard – 82.00	1	Turkey	Fatih Avan
A standard – 82.00	1	Uzbekistan	Ivan Zaytsev
B standard – 79.50	1	Argentina	Braian Toledo
B standard – 79.50	1	Armenia	Melik Janoyan
B standard – 79.50	1	China	Qin Qiang
B standard – 79.50	1	Egypt	Ihab Abdelrahman El Sayed
B standard – 79.50	1	Estonia	Risto Mätas
B standard – 79.50	1	Fiji	Leslie Copeland
B standard – 79.50	1	Kenya	Julius Yego
B standard – 79.50	1	Slovenia	Matija Kranjc
B standard – 79.50	1	Sweden	Kim Amb
B standard – 79.50	1	Trinidad and Tobago	Keshorn Walcott
Total	47		

=== Men's decathlon ===
Qualification standard	No. of athletes	Qualified athletes	Nominated athletes
A standard – 8200	3	Germany	Pascal Behrenbruch; Rico Freimuth; Jan-Felix Knobel
A standard – 8200	2	Cuba	Leonel Suárez; Yordani Garcia
A standard – 8200	2	Netherlands	Eelco Sintnicolaas; Ingmar Vos
A standard – 8200	2	Russia	Sergey Sviridov; Ilya Shkurenev
A standard – 8200	2	United States	Ashton Eaton; Trey Hardee
A standard – 8200	1	Algeria	Larbi Bouraada
A standard – 8200	1	Brazil	Luiz Alberto de Araújo
A standard – 8200	1	Belgium	Hans van Alphen
A standard – 8200	1	Estonia	Mikk Pahapill
A standard – 8200	0*	Jamaica	~~Maurice Smith~~ (injured)
A standard – 8200	1	Latvia	Edgars Erins
A standard – 8200	1	Serbia	Mihail Dudas
A standard – 8200	1	South Africa	Willem Coertzen
A standard – 8200	1	Ukraine	Oleksiy Kasyanov
B standard – 7950	1	Belarus	Eduard Mikhan
B standard – 7950	1	Canada	Damian Warner
B standard – 7950	1	Chile	Gonzalo Barroilhet
B standard – 7950	1	Czech Republic	Roman Šebrle
B standard – 7950	1	France	Kevin Mayer
B standard – 7950	1	Great Britain	Daniel Awde
B standard – 7950	1	Grenada	Kurt Felix
B standard – 7950	1	Hungary	Attila Szabó
B standard – 7950	1	Japan	Keisuke Ushiro
B standard – 7950	1	Kazakhstan	Dmitriy Karpov
B standard – 7950	1	Liberia	Jangy Addy
B standard – 7950	1	New Zealand	Brent Newdick
B standard – 7950	1	Uzbekistan	Rifat Artikov
Total	33		

=== Men's 20 km race walk ===
Qualification standard	No. of athletes	NOC	Nominated athletes
A standard – 1:22:30	3	Australia	Chris Erickson; Adam Rutter; Jared Tallent
A standard – 1:22:30	3	China	Cai Zilin; Chen Ding; Wang Zhen
A standard – 1:22:30	3	Colombia	Éider Arévalo; Luis Fernando López; James Rendón
A standard – 1:22:30	3	India	Gurmeet Singh; Baljinder Singh; Irfan Kolothum Thodi
A standard – 1:22:30	2*	Italy	Giorgio Rubino; Alex Schwazer; ~~Matteo Giupponi~~ (not selected)
A standard – 1:22:30	3	Japan	Isamu Fujisawa; Takumi Saito; Yusuke Suzuki
A standard – 1:22:30	3	South Korea	Byun Young-Jun; Kim Hyun-Sub; Park Chil-Sung
A standard – 1:22:30	3	Mexico	Eder Sánchez; Ever Palma; Isaac Palma
A standard – 1:22:30	3	Poland	Rafał Augustyn; Grzegorz Sudoł; Dawid Tomala
A standard – 1:22:30	3	Russia	Valeriy Borchin; Andrey Krivov; Vladimir Kanaykin
A standard – 1:22:30	3	Ukraine	Ruslan Dmytrenko; Nazar Kovalenko; Ivan Losyev
A standard – 1:22:30	2	Belarus	Dzianis Simanovich; Ivan Trotski
A standard – 1:22:30	2	Ecuador	Mauricio Arteaga; Cristian Chocho
A standard – 1:22:30	1*	France	~~Yohann Diniz~~; Bertrand Moulinet
A standard – 1:22:30	2	Germany	Christopher Linke; André Höhne
A standard – 1:22:30	2	Spain	Miguel Ángel López; Álvaro Martín
A standard – 1:22:30	1	Argentina	Juan Manuel Cano
A standard – 1:22:30	1	Brazil	Caio Bonfim
A standard – 1:22:30	1	Canada	Inaki Gomez
A standard – 1:22:30	1	Greece	Alexandros Papamichail
A standard – 1:22:30	1	Guatemala	Erick Barrondo
A standard – 1:22:30	1	Ireland	Robert Heffernan
A standard – 1:22:30	1	Lithuania	Marius Žiūkas
A standard – 1:22:30	0*	Portugal	~~João Vieira~~
A standard – 1:22:30	1	Slovakia	Anton Kučmín
A standard – 1:22:30	1	Tunisia	Hassanine Sebei
A standard – 1:22:30	1	United States	Trevor Barron
B standard – 1:24:30	1	Finland	Jarkko Kinnunen
B standard – 1:24:30	1	Hungary	Máté Helebrandt
B standard – 1:24:30	1	Iran	Ebrahim Rahimian
B standard – 1:24:30	1	Kazakhstan	Georgiy Sheiko
B standard – 1:24:30	1	Serbia	Predrag Filipović
B standard – 1:24:30	0*	~~Sweden~~	
B standard – 1:24:30	1	Turkey	Semiha Mutlu
Total	61		

=== Men's 50 km race walk ===
Qualification standard	No. of athletes	NOC	Qualified athletes
A standard – 3:59:00	3	Australia	Luke Adams; Nathan Deakes; Jared Tallent
A standard – 3:59:00	3	China	Li Jianbo; Si Tianfeng; Zhao Jianguo
A standard – 3:59:00	3	France	Yohann Diniz; Cédric Houssaye; Bertrand Moulinet
A standard – 3:59:00	2*	Germany	Andre Höhne; Christopher Linke
A standard – 3:59:00	3	Ireland	Brendan Boyce; Robert Heffernan
A standard – 3:59:00	2*	Italy	Marco De Luca; Alex Schwazer
A standard – 3:59:00	3	Japan	Koichiro Morioka; Takayuki Tanii; Yuki Yamazaki
A standard – 3:59:00	3	Mexico	Horacio Nava; Jose Leyver; Omar Zepeda
A standard – 3:59:00	3	Poland	Rafał Fedaczyński; Łukasz Nowak; Rafał Sikora
A standard – 3:59:00	3	Russia	Sergey Bakulin; Sergey Kirdyapkin; Igor Yerokhin
A standard – 3:59:00	3	South Korea	Kim Dong-Young; Park Chil-Sung; Yim Jung-Hyun
A standard – 3:59:00	3	Spain	Jesús Ángel García; Mikel Odriozola; Benjamín Sánchez
A standard – 3:59:00	3	Ukraine	Sergiy Budza; Ihor Hlavan; Oleksiy Kazanin
A standard – 3:59:00	2	Chile	Edward Araya; Yerko Araya
A standard – 3:59:00	2	Ecuador	Andrés Chocho; Xavier Moreno
A standard – 3:59:00	2	Finland	Antti Kempas; Jarkko Kinnunen
A standard – 3:59:00	2	Guatemala	Jaime Quiyuch; Erick Barrondo
A standard – 3:59:00	1*	Portugal	João Vieira; ~~Pedro Isidro~~
A standard – 3:59:00	2	Slovakia	Milos Batovsky; Matej Toth
A standard – 3:59:00	1	Belarus	Ivan Trotsky
A standard – 3:59:00	1	El Salvador	Emerson Hernandez
A standard – 3:59:00	1	Greece	Alexandros Papamichail
A standard – 3:59:00	1	New Zealand	Quentin Rew
A standard – 3:59:00	1	Norway	Trond Nymark
A standard – 3:59:00	1	Romania	Marius Cocioran
A standard – 3:59:00	1	South Africa	Marc Mundell
A standard – 3:59:00	0*	Sweden	
B standard – 4:09:00	0*	Brazil	
B standard – 4:09:00	1	Colombia	Freddy Hernandez
B standard – 4:09:00	1	Great Britain	Dominic King
B standard – 4:09:00	1	Georgia	Masiej Romievich
B standard – 4:09:00	1	India	Basanta Bahadur Rana
B standard – 4:09:00	1	Latvia	Igors Kazakevics
B standard – 4:09:00	1	Lithuania	Tadas Šuškevičius
B standard – 4:09:00	1	Serbia	Nenad Filipovic
B standard – 4:09:00	0*	Switzerland	
B standard – 4:09:00	1	United States	John Nunn
Total	66		

=== Men's 4x100 m relay ===
Qualification standard	No. of teams	Qualified teams
Top 16 teams	1 Team	Jamaica; United States; France; Great Britain; Trinidad and Tobago; Brazil; Germany; Poland; Saint Kitts and Nevis; Hong Kong; Canada; Italy; Japan; China; Australia; Netherlands

=== Men's 4x400 m relay ===
Qualification standard	No. of teams	Qualified teams
Top 16 teams	1 Team	United States; South Africa; Jamaica; Cuba; Russia; Belgium; Great Britain; Bahamas; Germany; Trinidad and Tobago; Kenya; Venezuela; Australia; Dominican Republic; Japan; Poland

== Women's events ==
=== Women's 100 m ===
Qualification standard	No. of athletes	NOC	Qualified athletes
A standard – 11.22	3	Bahamas	Debbie Ferguson-McKenzie; Sheniqua Ferguson; Anthonique Strachan
A standard – 11.22	2	France	Veronique Mang; Myriam Soumare
A standard – 11.22	2	Great Britain	Anyika Onuora; Abi Oyepitan
A standard – 11.22	3	Jamaica	Shelly-Ann Fraser-Pryce; Veronica Campbell Brown; Kerron Stewart
A standard – 11.22	3	Nigeria	Gloria Asumnu; Blessing Okagbare; Lauretta Ozoh
A standard – 11.22	3	Trinidad and Tobago	Kelly-Ann Baptiste; Semoy Hackett; Kai Selvon
A standard – 11.22	2	Ukraine	Nataliya Pohrebnyak; Olesya Povh; Mariya Ryemyen
A standard – 11.22	3	United States	Carmelita Jeter; Tianna Madison; Allyson Felix
A standard – 11.22	1*	Bulgaria	Ivet Lalova; ~~Inna Eftimova~~ (suspended)
A standard – 11.22	2	Virgin Islands	LaVerne Jones-Ferrette; Allison Peter
A standard – 11.22	0*	Barbados	~~Shakera Reece~~ (not selected)
A standard – 11.22	1	Brazil	Rosângela Santos
A standard – 11.22	1	Cayman Islands	Cydonie Mothersill
A standard – 11.22	1	Ivory Coast	Murielle Ahouré
A standard – 11.22	1	Gabon	Ruddy Zang Milama
A standard – 11.22	2	Germany	Tatjana Pinto; Verena Sailer
A standard – 11.22	1	British Virgin Islands	Tahesia Harrigan
A standard – 11.22	1	Japan	Chisato Fukushima
A standard – 11.22	0*	Netherlands	Dafne Schippers *(relay)
A standard – 11.22	1	Norway	Ezinne Okparaebo
A standard – 11.22	1	Russia	Yevgeniya Polyakova
A standard – 11.22	1	Saint Kitts and Nevis	Tameka Williams
B standard – 11.38	1	Canada	Phylicia George
B standard – 11.38	1	China	Wei Yongli
B standard – 11.38	1	Australia	Melissa Breen
B standard – 11.38	1	Colombia	Yomara Hinestroza
B standard – 11.38	0*	~~Cuba~~	
B standard – 11.38	1	Kazakhstan	Olga Bludova
B standard – 11.38	1	Liberia	Phobay Kutu-Akoi
B standard – 11.38	1	Lithuania	Lina Grinčikaitė
B standard – 11.38	1	Poland	Marta Jeschke
B standard – 11.38	1	Romania	Andreea Ogrăzeanu
B standard – 11.38	1	Turkey	Nimet Karakuş
B standard – 11.38	1	Uzbekistan	Guzel Khubbieva
Universality	1	Andorra	Cristina Llovera
Universality	1	Cook Islands	Patricia Taea
Universality	1	Federated States of Micronesia	Mihter Wendolin
Universality	1	Honduras	Jeimy Bernardez
Universality	1	Hong Kong	Fong Yee Pui
Universality	1	Iraq	Dana Hussein
Universality	1	Jordan	Rima Fareed
Universality	1	Kuwait	Saisabeel Al-Sayyar
Universality	1	Palau	Ruby Joy Gabriel
Universality	1	Papua New Guinea	Toea Wisil
Universality	1	Qatar	Noor Al-Malki
Universality	1	Solomon Islands	Pauline Kwalea
Universality	1	San Marino	Martina Pretelli
Universality	1	Togo	Bamab Napo
Universality	1	Turkmenistan	Maýsa Rejepowa
Universality	1	Vanuatu	Janice Alatoa
Total	49		

=== Women's 200 m ===
Qualification standard	No. of athletes	NOC	Qualified athletes
A standard – 23.10	3	Bahamas	Sheniqua Ferguson; Shaunae Miller; Anthonique Strachan
A standard – 23.10	3	Great Britain	Margaret Adeoye; Anyika Onuora; Abiodun Oyepitan
A standard – 23.10	3	Jamaica	Shelly-Ann Fraser-Pryce; Sherone Simpson; Veronica Campbell Brown
A standard – 23.10	3	Nigeria	Gloria Asumnu; Lauretta Ozoh; Christy Udoh
A standard – 23.10	3	Russia	Aleksandra Fedoriva; Natalya Rusakova; Elizabeta Savlinis
A standard – 23.10	3	Ukraine	Yelizaveta Bryzhina; Viktoriya Pyatachenko; Hrystyna Stuy
A standard – 23.10	3	United States	Allyson Felix; Carmelita Jeter; Sanya Richards-Ross
A standard – 23.10	1*	Brazil	Ana Cláudia Lemos
A standard – 23.10	1*	Canada	Crystal Emmanuel
A standard – 23.10	1*	France	Myriam Soumaré
A standard – 23.10	2	Trinidad and Tobago	Semoy Hackett; Kai Selvon
A standard – 23.10	2	Virgin Islands	LaVerne Jones-Ferrette Allison Peter
A standard – 23.10	0*	~~Australia~~	
A standard – 23.10	0*	Botswana	
A standard – 23.10	1	Bulgaria	Ivet Lalova
A standard – 23.10	1	Cayman Islands	Cydonie Mothersill
A standard – 23.10	1	Colombia	Norma Gonzalez
A standard – 23.10	1	Cuba	Nelkys Casabona
A standard – 23.10	0*	Czech Republic	
A standard – 23.10	1	Dominican Republic	Mariely Sánchez
A standard – 23.10	0*	Germany	
A standard – 23.10	1	Ghana	Vida Anim
A standard – 23.10	1	Netherlands	Dafne Schippers
A standard – 23.10	0*	South Africa	~~Tsholofelo Selemela Thipe~~
A standard – 23.10	1	Senegal	Ndeye Fatou Soumah
A standard – 23.10	1	Saint Kitts and Nevis	Tameka Williams
A standard – 23.10	1	Venezuela	Nercelis Soto
B standard – 23.30	0*	~~Belgium~~	
B standard – 23.30	1	Japan	Chisato Fukushima
B standard – 23.30	1	Kazakhstan	Viktoriya Zyabkina
B standard – 23.30	1	Poland	Anna Kiełbasińska
B standard – 23.30	0*	~~Sweden~~	
Total	48		

=== Women's 400 m ===
Qualification standard	No. of athletes	NOC	Qualified athletes
A standard – 51.55	3	Great Britain	Christine Ohuruogu; Shana Cox; Lee McConnell
A standard – 51.55	3	Jamaica	Novlene Williams-Mills; Rosemarie Whyte; Christine Day
A standard – 51.55	3	Russia	Antonina Krivoshapka; Yuliya Gushchina; Tatyana Firova
A standard – 51.55	3	United States	Sanya Richards-Ross; DeeDee Trotter; Francena McCorory
A standard – 51.55	2	Colombia	Norma González; Jennifer Padilla
A standard – 51.55	2	Nigeria	Regina George; Omolara Omotosho
A standard – 51.55	2	Ukraine	Alina Lohvynenko; Nataliya Pyhyda
A standard – 51.55	1	Bahamas	Shaunae Miller
A standard – 51.55	1	Belarus	Sviatlana Usovich
A standard – 51.55	1	Botswana	Amantle Montsho
A standard – 51.55	1	Brazil	Geisa Coutinho
A standard – 51.55	1	Bulgaria	Vanya Stambolova
A standard – 51.55	1	Czech Republic	Denisa Rosolová
A standard – 51.55	1	Ireland	Joanne Cuddihy
A standard – 51.55	1	Italy	Libania Grenot
A standard – 51.55	1	Namibia	Tjipekapora Herunga
A standard – 51.55	0*	~~South Africa~~	
A standard – 51.55	1	Turkey	Pınar Saka
B standard – 52.35	1	Canada	Jenna Martin
B standard – 52.35	0*	~~Cuba~~	
B standard – 52.35	1	Dominican Republic	Raysa Sánchez
B standard – 52.35	0*	~~Ethiopia~~	
B standard – 52.35	0*	~~France~~	
B standard – 52.35	0*	~~Germany~~	
B standard – 52.35	1	Grenada	Kanika Beckles
B standard – 52.35	1	Guyana	Aliann Pompey
B standard – 52.35	1	Kenya	Joy Sakari
B standard – 52.35	1	Romania	Bianca Răzor
B standard – 52.35	1	Senegal	Ndeye Fatou Soumah
B standard – 52.35	1	Spain	Aauri Lorena Bokesa
B standard – 52.35	1	Sweden	Moa Hjelmer
Universality	1	Fiji	Danielle Alakija
Total	40		

=== Women's 800 m ===
Qualification standard	No. of athletes	NOC	Qualified athletes
A standard – 1:59.90	3	Belarus	Maryna Arzamasava
A standard – 1:59.90	0*	Great Britain	~~Emma Jackson~~ (not selected); ~~Marilyn Okoro~~ (not selected); ~~Jemma Simpson~~ (not selected)
A standard – 1:59.90	3	Kenya	Pamela Jelimo; Winnie Chebet; Janeth Jepkosgei
A standard – 1:59.90	3	Russia	Mariya Savinova; Yekaterina Poyistogova; Elena Arzhakova
A standard – 1:59.90	3	Ukraine	Yuliya Krevsun; Liliya Lobanova; Nataliya Lupu
A standard – 1:59.90	3	United States	Alysia Montano; Geena Gall; Alice Schmidt
A standard – 1:59.90	2	Canada	Melissa Bishop; Jessica Smith
A standard – 1:59.90	2	Morocco	Malika Akkaoui; Halima Hachlaf
A standard – 1:59.90	0*	Algeria	~~Zahra Bouras~~
A standard – 1:59.90	1	Cuba	Rose Mary Almanza
A standard – 1:59.90	1	Ethiopia	Fantu Magiso
A standard – 1:59.90	1	Jamaica	Kenia Sinclair
A standard – 1:59.90	1	Romania	Mirela Lavric
A standard – 1:59.90	1	South Africa	Caster Semenya
A standard – 1:59.90	1	Slovakia	Lucia Klocová
A standard – 1:59.90	1	Uganda	Annet Negesa
B standard – 2:01.30	0*	Australia	
B standard – 2:01.30	1	Colombia	Rosibel García
B standard – 2:01.30	1	Czech Republic	Lenka Masná
B standard – 2:01.30	0*	France	
B standard – 2:01.30	0*	Germany	
B standard – 2:01.30	1	Great Britain	Lynsey Sharp
B standard – 2:01.30	1	Grenada	Neisha Bernard-Thomas
B standard – 2:01.30	1	India	Tintu Luka
B standard – 2:01.30	0*	Italy	
B standard – 2:01.30	1	Kazakhstan	Margarita Matsko
B standard – 2:01.30	1	Moldova	Elena Popescu
B standard – 2:01.30	0*	Netherlands	
B standard – 2:01.30	0*	Norway	
B standard – 2:01.30	0*	Poland	
B standard – 2:01.30	1	Turkey	Merve Aydın
Total	43		

=== Women's 1500 m ===
Qualification standard	No. of athletes	NOC	Qualified athletes
A standard – 4:06.00	3	Bahrain	Genzeb Shumi; Maryam Yusuf Jamal; Mimi Belete
A standard – 4:06.00	3	Ethiopia	Abeba Arigawe; Genzebe Dibaba; Meskerem Assefa
A standard – 4:06.00	3	Great Britain	Lisa Dobriskey; Hannah England; Laura Weightman
A standard – 4:06.00	3	Kenya	Hellen Obiri; Eunice Sum; Faith Chepngetich
A standard – 4:06.00	2*	Morocco	Siham Hilali; Btissam Lakhouad; ~~Mariem Alaoui Selsouli~~ (banned)
A standard – 4:06.00	3	Russia	Yekaterina Kostetskaya; Yekaterina Martynova; Tatyana Tomashova
A standard – 4:06.00	3	Spain	Natalia Rodríguez; Nuria Fernández; Isabel Macías
A standard – 4:06.00	3	Turkey	Aslı Çakır Alptekin; Tuğba Karakaya; Gamze Bulut
A standard – 4:06.00	3	United States	Morgan Uceny; Shannon Rowbury; Jenny Simpson
A standard – 4:06.00	2	Australia	Zoe Buckman; Kaila McKnight
A standard – 4:06.00	2	Canada	Hilary Stellingwerff; Nicole Sifuentes
A standard – 4:06.00	1*	Germany	Corinna Harrer
A standard – 4:06.00	2	Ukraine	Anna Mishchenko; Anzhelika Shevchenko
A standard – 4:06.00	0*	France	
A standard – 4:06.00	1	New Zealand	Lucy van Dalen
A standard – 4:06.00	1	Norway	Ingvill Måkestad Bovim
A standard – 4:06.00	1	Poland	Renata Pliś
A standard – 4:06.00	1	Uganda	Janet Achola
B standard – 4:08.90	1	Belarus	Natallia Kareiva
B standard – 4:08.90	0*	China	
B standard – 4:08.90	1	Czech Republic	Tereza Čapková
B standard – 4:08.90	0*	Ireland	
B standard – 4:08.90	0*	Portugal	
B standard – 4:08.90	1	Serbia	Marina Muncan
B standard – 4:08.90	1	Slovenia	Sonja Roman
B standard – 4:08.90	1	Slovakia	Lucia Klocová
Universality	1	El Salvador	Nataly Landaverde
Universality	1	United Arab Emirates	Betlhem Deslagn Belayneh
Total	45		

=== Women's 5000 m ===
Qualification standard	No. of athletes	NOC	Qualified athletes
A standard – 15:20.00	3	Ethiopia	Gelete Burka; Meseret Defar; Genet Yalew
A standard – 15:20.00	3	Great Britain	Julia Bleasdale; Jo Pavey; Barbara Parker
A standard – 15:20.00	3	Italy	Nadia Ejjafini; Elena Romagnolo; Silvia Weissteiner
A standard – 15:20.00	1*	Japan	Hitomi Niiya
A standard – 15:20.00	3	Kenya	Vivian Cheruiyot; Sally Kipyego; Viola Kibiwot
A standard – 15:20.00	3	Russia	Olga Golovkina; Yelena Nagovitsyna
A standard – 15:20.00	3	United States	Julie Culley; Molly Huddle; Kim Conley
A standard – 15:20.00	1*	Turkey	Dudu Karakaya
A standard – 15:20.00	1	Bahrain	Shitaye Eshete
A standard – 15:20.00	0*	Brazil	
A standard – 15:20.00	1	Canada	Sheila Reid
A standard – 15:20.00	0*	New Zealand	
A standard – 15:20.00	1	Portugal	Sara Moreira
A standard – 15:20.00	1	Tanzania	Zakia Mrisho Mohamed
B standard – 15:30.00	0*	Australia	
B standard – 15:30.00	1	Azerbaijan	Layes Abdullayeva
B standard – 15:30.00	1	Belgium	Almensch Belete
B standard – 15:30.00	0*	China	
B standard – 15:30.00	0*	Germany	
B standard – 15:30.00	1	Ireland	Fionnuala Britton
B standard – 15:30.00	1	Mexico	Sandra López
B standard – 15:30.00	0*	Poland	
B standard – 15:30.00	1	Spain	Judit Plá
Total	35		

=== Women's 10,000 m ===
Qualification standard	No. of athletes	NOC	Qualified athletes
A standard – 31:45.00	3	Ethiopia	Tirunesh Dibaba; Werknesh Kidane; Belaynesh Oljira
A standard – 31:45.00	2*	Japan	Kayoko Fukushi; Mika Yoshikawa
A standard – 31:45.00	3	Kenya	Vivian Cheruiyot; Sally Kipyego; Lineth Chepkirui
A standard – 31:45.00	3	United States	Amy Hastings; Lisa Uhl; Janet Bawcom
A standard – 31:45.00	1*	China	Chen Rong
A standard – 31:45.00	2	Portugal	Dulce Félix; Sara Moreira
A standard – 31:45.00	1	Australia	Eloise Wellings
A standard – 31:45.00	0*	Bahrain	
A standard – 31:45.00	0*	Brazil	
A standard – 31:45.00	0*	France	
A standard – 31:45.00	1	Germany	Sabrina Mockenhaupt
A standard – 31:45.00	1	Great Britain	Julia Bleasdale
A standard – 31:45.00	1	Ireland	Fionnuala Britton
A standard – 31:45.00	1	Russia	Yelizaveta Grechishnikova
B standard – 32:10.00	1	Spain	Gema Barrachina
Total	25		

=== Women's marathon ===
Qualification standard	No. of athletes	NOC	Qualified athletes
A standard – 2:37:00	3	Australia	Jessica Trengove; Lisa Weightman; Benita Willis
A standard – 2:37:00	3	Belarus	Volha Dubouskaya; Sviatlana Kouhan; Nastassia Staravoitava
A standard – 2:37:00	3	China	Wang Jiali; Zhou Chunxiu; Zhu Xiaolin
A standard – 2:37:00	3	Ethiopia	Mare Dibaba; Tiki Gelana; Aselefech Mergia
A standard – 2:37:00	1*	France	Christelle Daunay
A standard – 2:37:00	3	Great Britain	Claire Hallissey; Mara Yamauchi; Paula Radcliffe
A standard – 2:37:00	2*	Germany	Susanne Hahn; Irina Mikitenko
A standard – 2:37:00	3	Hungary	Zsófia Erdélyi; Anikó Kálovics; Bea Rakonczai
A standard – 2:37:00	3	Ireland	Linda Byrne; Ava Hutchinson; Maria McCambridge
A standard – 2:37:00	3	Italy	Valeria Straneo; Anna Incerti; Rosaria Console
A standard – 2:37:00	3	Japan	Ryoko Kizaki; Yoshimi Ozaki; Risa Shigetomo
A standard – 2:37:00	3	Kenya	Mary Keitany; Edna Kiplagat; Priscah Jeptoo
A standard – 2:37:00	3	North Korea	Jon Kyong-Hui; Kim Kum-Ok; Kim Mi-Gyong
A standard – 2:37:00	3	South Korea	Chung Yun-Hee; Kim Sung-Eun; Lim Kyung-Hee
A standard – 2:37:00	3	Lithuania	Rasa Drazdauskaite; Diana Lobacevske; Remalda Kergyte
A standard – 2:37:00	3	Mexico	Marisol Romero; Madaí Pérez; Karina Pérez
A standard – 2:37:00	3	Morocco	Soumiya Labani; Samira Raif
A standard – 2:37:00	2*	Netherlands	Hilda Kibet; Lornah Kiplagat
A standard – 2:37:00	3	Peru	Wilma Arzipana; Ines Melchor; Gladys Tejeda
A standard – 2:37:00	1*	Poland	Karolina Jarzyńska
A standard – 2:37:00	3	Portugal	Jéssica Augusto; Marisa Barros; Dulce Félix
A standard – 2:37:00	2*	Romania	Constantina Diță; Lidia Șimon
A standard – 2:37:00	3	Russia	Liliya Shobukhova; Albina Mayorova; Tatyana Petrova
A standard – 2:37:00	3	South Africa	Rene Kalmer; Tanith Maxwell; Irvette van Blerk
A standard – 2:37:00	3	Spain	Alessandra Aguilar; Elena Espeso; Vanessa Veiga
A standard – 2:37:00	3	Turkey	Bahar Doğan; Sultan Haydar; Ümmü Kiraz
A standard – 2:37:00	3	Ukraine	Olena Burkovska; Tatiana Filonyuk; Tetyana Hamera-Shmyrko
A standard – 2:37:00	3	United States	Desiree Davila; Shalane Flanagan; Kara Goucher
A standard – 2:37:00	2	Canada	Lanni Marchant; Krista DuChene
A standard – 2:37:00	2	Chile	Érika Olivera; Natalia Romero
A standard – 2:37:00	1*	Eritrea	Rehaset Mehari
A standard – 2:37:00	2	Namibia	Helalia Johannes; Beata Naigambo
A standard – 2:37:00	2	Norway	Christina Bus Holth; Kirsten Marathon Melkevik
A standard – 2:37:00	2	Serbia	Olivera Jevtić; Ana Subotić
A standard – 2:37:00	1*	Zimbabwe	Sharon Tavengwa
A standard – 2:37:00	1	Algeria	Souad Ait Salem
A standard – 2:37:00	1	Austria	Andrea Mayr
A standard – 2:37:00	0*	Belgium	
A standard – 2:37:00	1	Bosnia and Herzegovina	Lucia Kimani
A standard – 2:37:00	1	Bahrain	Lishan Dula
A standard – 2:37:00	1	Brazil	Adriana Aparecida da Silva
A standard – 2:37:00	1	Colombia	Erika Abril
A standard – 2:37:00	1	Croatia	Lisa Stublić
A standard – 2:37:00	1	Czech Republic	Ivana Sekyrova
A standard – 2:37:00	1	Denmark	Jessica Draskau
A standard – 2:37:00	1	Finland	Leena Puotiniemi
A standard – 2:37:00	1	Kyrgyzstan	Yuliya Arkhipova
A standard – 2:37:00	1	Latvia	Dace Lina
A standard – 2:37:00	1	Mongolia	Luvsanlkhündegiin Otgonbayar
A standard – 2:37:00	1	New Zealand	Kim Smith
A standard – 2:37:00	1	Switzerland	Maja Neuenschwander
A standard – 2:37:00	1	Sweden	Isabellah Andersson
B standard – 2:43:00	1	Argentina	María de los Ángeles Peralta
B standard – 2:43:00	1	Burundi	Diana Nukuri
B standard – 2:43:00	1	Costa Rica	Gabriela Traña
B standard – 2:43:00	1	Cuba	Dailín Belmonte
B standard – 2:43:00	1	Ecuador	Rosa Chacha
B standard – 2:43:00	1	Estonia	Evelin Talts
B standard – 2:43:00	1	Greece	Konstadina Kefala
B standard – 2:43:00	1	Moldova	Natalia Cercheș
B standard – 2:43:00	1	Montenegro	Slađana Perunović
B standard – 2:43:00	1	Slovenia	Žana Jereb
B standard – 2:43:00	1	Slovakia	Katarína Berešová
B standard – 2:43:00	1	Tunisia	Amira Ben Amor
B standard – 2:43:00	1	Uganda	Jane Suuto
B standard – 2:43:00	1	Venezuela	Yolimar Pineda
Universality	1	Indonesia	Triyaningsih
Universality	1	Lesotho	Mamoroallo Tjoka
Universality	1	Myanmar	Ni Lar San
Universality	1	Rwanda	Claudette Mukasakindi
Universality	1	Timor-Leste	Juventina Napoleao
Total	124		

=== Women's 3000 m steeplechase ===
Qualification standard	No. of athletes	NOC	Qualified athletes
A standard – 9:43.00	3	Ethiopia	Sofia Assefa; Hiwot Ayalew; Etenesh Diro
A standard – 9:43.00	3	Kenya	Milcah Chemos; Mercy Njoroge; Lydia Rotich
A standard – 9:43.00	3	Russia	Yuliya Zaripova; Gulnara Samitova-Galkina; Yelena Orlova
A standard – 9:43.00	3	Turkey	Gülcan Mıngır; Binnaz Uslu; Gamze Bulut
A standard – 9:43.00	3	United States	Emma Coburn; Bridget Franek; Shalaya Kipp
A standard – 9:43.00	2	China	Li Zhenzhu; Yin Annuo
A standard – 9:43.00	2	Germany	Gesa Felicitas Krause; Antje Möldner-Schmidt
A standard – 9:43.00	2	Great Britain	Barbara Parker; Eilish McColgan
A standard – 9:43.00	2	Ireland	Fionnuala Britton; Stephanie Reilly
A standard – 9:43.00	2	Morocco	Salima Ouali Alami; Kaltoum Bouaasayriya
A standard – 9:43.00	2	Poland	Katarzyna Kowalska; Matylda Szlęzak
A standard – 9:43.00	2	Romania	Ancuța Bobocel; Cristina Casandra
A standard – 9:43.00	2	Spain	Marta Domínguez; Diana Martín
A standard – 9:43.00	2	Ukraine	Svitlana Shmidt; Valentyna Zhudina
A standard – 9:43.00	1	Colombia	Ángela Figueroa
A standard – 9:43.00	0*	Czech Republic	~~Marcela Lustigova~~
A standard – 9:43.00	0*	Greece	~~Irini Kokkinariou~~
A standard – 9:43.00	1	Italy	~~Giulia Martinelli~~
A standard – 9:43.00	1	Jamaica	Korene Hinds
A standard – 9:43.00	1	Latvia	Polina Jelizarova
A standard – 9:43.00	1	Portugal	Clarisse Cruz
A standard – 9:43.00	1	Puerto Rico	Beverly Ramos
A standard – 9:43.00	1	Tunisia	Habiba Ghribi
B standard – 9:48.00	0*	~~Azerbaijan~~	
B standard – 9:48.00	1	Bulgaria	Silvia Danekova
B standard – 9:48.00	0*	~~France~~	
B standard – 9:48.00	1	India	Sudha Singh
B standard – 9:48.00	1	Norway	Karoline Bjerkeli Grøvdal
Total	42		

=== Women's 100 m hurdles ===
Qualification standard	No. of athletes	NOC	Qualified athletes
A standard – 12.96
A standard – 12.96	3	Canada	Jessica Zelinka; Nikkita Holder; Phylicia George
A standard – 12.96	1*	France	Reïna-Flor Okori
A standard – 12.96	3	Jamaica	Brigitte Foster-Hylton; Latoya Greaves; Shermaine Williams
A standard – 12.96	3	United States	Dawn Harper; Kellie Wells; Lolo Jones
A standard – 12.96	3	Kazakhstan	Nataliya Ivoninskaya; Anastassiya Pilipenko; Anastasiya Soprunova
A standard – 12.96	2	Belarus	Katsiaryna Paplauskaya; Alina Talai
A standard – 12.96	2	Belgium	Eline Berings; Anne Zagré
A standard – 12.96	2	Colombia	Lina Flores; Briggite Merlano
A standard – 12.96	2	Great Britain	Tiffany Porter; Jessica Ennis
A standard – 12.96	2	Germany	Carolin Nytra; Cindy Roleder
A standard – 12.96	2	Russia	Tatyana Dektyareva; Yekaterina Galitskaya; Yuliya Kondakova
A standard – 12.96	1	Australia	Sally Pearson
A standard – 12.96	1	Austria	Beate Schrott
A standard – 12.96	1	China	Sun Yawei
A standard – 12.96	1	Czech Republic	Lucie Škrobáková
A standard – 12.96	1	Dominican Republic	LaVonne Idlette
A standard – 12.96	1	Ireland	Derval O'Rourke
A standard – 12.96	1	Italy	Marzia Caravelli
A standard – 12.96	1	Norway	Christina Vukicevic
A standard – 12.96	1	Switzerland	Noemi Zbären
A standard – 12.96	1	Turkey	Nevin Yanıt
B standard – 13.15	0*	~~Barbados~~	
B standard – 13.15	0*	~~Brazil~~	
B standard – 13.15	0*	~~Cuba~~	
B standard – 13.15	1	Japan	Ayako Kimura
B standard – 13.15	1	South Korea	Jung Hye-Lim
B standard – 13.15	1	Lithuania	Sonata Tamošaitytė
B standard – 13.15	0*	~~Netherlands~~	
B standard – 13.15	1	Nigeria	Seun Adigun
B standard – 13.15	0*	Poland	
B standard – 13.15	1	Slovenia	Marina Tomić
B standard – 13.15	1	Trinidad and Tobago	Josanne Lucas
Total	44		

=== Women's 400 m hurdles ===
Qualification standard	No. of athletes	Qualified athletes	
A standard – 55.50	3	Jamaica	Melaine Walker; Kaliese Spencer; Nickiesha Wilson
A standard – 55.50	3	Russia	Irina Davydova; Natalya Antyukh; Yelena Churakova
A standard – 55.50	2*	Ukraine	Hanna Titimets; Hanna Yaroshchuk
A standard – 55.50	3	United States	Lashinda Demus; Georganne Moline; T'erea Brown
A standard – 55.50	2	Great Britain	Eilidh Child; Perri Shakes-Drayton
A standard – 55.50	1	Australia	Lauren Boden
A standard – 55.50	1	Belgium	Elodie Ouedraogo
A standard – 55.50	1	Bulgaria	Vanya Stambolova
A standard – 55.50	1	China	Huang Xiaoxiao
A standard – 55.50	0*	Cuba	~~Yadisleidis Pedroso~~
A standard – 55.50	1	Czech Republic	Zuzana Hejnová
A standard – 55.50	1	Japan	Satomi Kubokura
A standard – 55.50	0*	South Africa	~~Wenda Theron~~
A standard – 55.50	1	Nigeria	Muizat Ajoke Odumosu
A standard – 55.50	1	Poland	Anna Jesień
A standard – 55.50	1	Turkey	Nagihan Karadere
B standard – 56.65	1	Brazil	Jailma de Lima
B standard – 56.65	1	Colombia	Princesa Oliveiros
B standard – 56.65	1	Croatia	Nikolina Horvat
B standard – 56.65	1	Denmark	Sara Slott Petersen
B standard – 56.65	0*	~~France~~	
B standard – 56.65	1	Germany	Silvio Schirrmeister
B standard – 56.65	0*	~~Ireland~~	
B standard – 56.65	1	Italy	~~Manuela Gentili~~
B standard – 56.65	1	Kenya	Maureen Maiyo
B standard – 56.65	1	Morocco	Hayat Lambarki
B standard – 56.65	0*	~~Norway~~	
B standard – 56.65	1	Portugal	Vera Barbosa
B standard – 56.65	1	Romania	Angela Moroșanu
B standard – 56.65	1	Trinidad and Tobago	Janeil Bellille
B standard – 56.65	1	Uzbekistan	Nataliya Asanova
B standard – 56.65	Total	39	

=== Women's high jump ===
Qualification standard	No. of athletes	NOC	Qualified athletes
A standard – 1.95	3	Russia	Anna Chicherova; Svetlana Shkolina; Irina Gordeeva
A standard – 1.95	3	United States	Chaunté Lowe; Brigetta Barrett; Amy Acuff
A standard – 1.95	2	Sweden	Ebba Jungmark; Emma Green Tregaro
A standard – 1.95	2	Uzbekistan	Nadiya Dusanova; Svetlana Radzivil
A standard – 1.95	1	Belgium	Tia Hellebaut
A standard – 1.95	1	Bulgaria	Venelina Veneva
A standard – 1.95	1	China	Zheng Xingjuan
A standard – 1.95	0*	Croatia	~~Blanka Vlašić~~ (injured)
A standard – 1.95	1	Estonia	Anna Iljuštšenko
A standard – 1.95	1	France	Melanie Melfort
A standard – 1.95	1	Ireland	Deirdre Ryan
A standard – 1.95	0* or 1	Italy	~~Antonietta Di Martino~~ (injured); Alessia Trost (reserve)
A standard – 1.95	1	Lithuania	Airinė Palšytė
A standard – 1.95	1	Nigeria	Doreen Amata
A standard – 1.95	1	Norway	Tonje Angelsen
A standard – 1.95	1	Romania	Esthera Petre
A standard – 1.95	1	Spain	Ruth Beitia
A standard – 1.95	1	Ukraine	Olena Kholosha
B standard – 1.92	1	Croatia	Ana Šimić
B standard – 1.92	1	Czech Republic	Oldřiška Marešová
B standard – 1.92	1	Germany	Ariane Friedrich
B standard – 1.92	1	India	Sahana Kumari
B standard – 1.92	0*	~~Israel~~	
B standard – 1.92	1	Kazakhstan	Marina Aitova
B standard – 1.92	0*	~~Poland~~	
B standard – 1.92	1	Saint Lucia	Levern Spencer
B standard – 1.92	1	Thailand	Wanida Boonwan
B standard – 1.92	1	Greece	Antonia Stergiou
B standard – 1.92	1	Turkey	Burcu Ayhan
B standard – 1.92	1	Vietnam	Dương Thị Việt Anh
Total	33		

=== Women's pole vault ===
Qualification standard	No. of athletes	NOC	Qualified athletes
A standard – 4.50	3	Germany	Lisa Ryzih; Silke Spiegelburg; Martina Strutz
A standard – 4.50	3	Russia	Yelena Isinbaeva; Svetlana Feofanova; Anastasia Savchenko
A standard – 4.50	3	United States	Jennifer Suhr; Lacy Janson; Becky Holliday
A standard – 4.50	2	Australia	Alana Boyd; Liz Parnov
A standard – 4.50	2	France	Vanessa Boslak; Marion Lotout
A standard – 4.50	2	Great Britain	Holly Bleasdale; Kate Dennison
A standard – 4.50	3	Greece	Nikoleta Kyriakopoulou; Stélla-Iró Ledáki; Katerina Stefanidi
A standard – 4.50	2	Poland	Monika Pyrek; Anna Rogowska
A standard – 4.50	1	Belarus	Anastasiya Shvedova
A standard – 4.50	1	Brazil	Fabiana Murer
A standard – 4.50	1	Canada	Mélanie Blouin
A standard – 4.50	1	China	Li Ling
A standard – 4.50	1	Cuba	Yarisley Silva
A standard – 4.50	1	Czech Republic	Jiřina Ptáčníková
A standard – 4.50	1	Ireland	Tori Pena
A standard – 4.50	1	Israel	Jillian Schwartz
A standard – 4.50	0*	Italy	~~Anna Giordano Bruno~~
A standard – 4.50	1	Portugal	Maria Eleonor Tavares
A standard – 4.50	1	Slovenia	Tina Šutej
A standard – 4.50	1	Sweden	Angelica Bengtsson
A standard – 4.50	1	Switzerland	Nicole Büchler
A standard – 4.50	1	Ukraine	Ganna Shelekh
B standard – 4.40	1	Denmark	Caroline Bonde Holm
B standard – 4.40	1	South Korea	Choi Yun-Hee
B standard – 4.40	0*	~~Norway~~	
B standard – 4.40	0*	~~Spain~~	
Total	37		

=== Women's long jump ===
Qualification standard	No. of athletes	NOC	Qualified athletes
A standard – 6.75	3	Belarus	Nastassia Mironchyk-Ivanova; Veronika Shutkova; Volha Sudarava
A standard – 6.75	3	Russia	Yelena Sokolova; Anna Nazarova; Lyudmila Kolchanova
A standard – 6.75	3	United States	Brittney Reese; Chelsea Hayes; Janay DeLoach
A standard – 6.75	1*	Germany	~~Bianca Kappler~~; Sosthene Moguenara
A standard – 6.75	1*	Great Britain	~~Abigail Iozuru~~; Shara Proctor
A standard – 6.75	2	Latvia	Lauma Griva; Ineta Radēviča
A standard – 6.75	2	Ukraine	Viktoriya Rybalko; Marharyta Tverdohlib
A standard – 6.75	1	Bahamas	Bianca Stuart
A standard – 6.75	1	Brazil	Maurren Maggi
A standard – 6.75	1	France	Éloyse Lesueur
A standard – 6.75	1	Nigeria	Blessing Okagbare
A standard – 6.75	0*	Poland	~~Teresa Dobija~~
A standard – 6.75	0*	Portugal	~~Naide Gomes~~ (injured)
A standard – 6.75	1	Switzerland	Irene Pusterla
B standard – 6.65	1	Philippines	Marestella Torres
B standard – 6.65	1	Romania	Viorica Țigău
B standard – 6.65	1	Serbia	Ivana Španović
B standard – 6.65	1	Sierra Leone	Ola Sesay
B standard – 6.65	0*	~~Slovenia~~	
B standard – 6.65	1	Spain	Concepción Montaner
B standard – 6.65	1	Slovakia	Jana Velďáková
B standard – 6.65	1	Sweden	Carolina Klüft
B standard – 6.65	1	Turkey	Karin Melis Mey
B standard – 6.65	0*	~~Uzbekistan~~	
Total	32		

=== Women's triple jump ===
Qualification standard	No. of athletes	NOC	Qualified athletes
A standard – 14.30	3	Cuba	Mabel Gay; Dailenys Alcántara; Josleidy Ribalta
A standard – 14.30	3	Greece	~~Paraskevi Papahristou~~; Niki Paneta; Athanasía Pérra
A standard – 14.30	3	Russia	Tatyana Lebedeva; Viktoriya Valyukevich; Veronika Mosina
A standard – 14.30	3	Ukraine	Olha Saladuha; Hanna Knyazyeva; Ruslana Tsykhotska
A standard – 14.30	2	Belarus	Natallia Viatkina; Kseniya Pryiemka-Dziatsuk
A standard – 14.30	2	China	Xie Limei; Li Yanmei
A standard – 14.30	2	Kazakhstan	Olga Rypakova; Irina Litvinenko Ektova
A standard – 14.30	1*	Slovakia	Dana Velďáková; ~~Jana Velďáková~~
A standard – 14.30	2	Uzbekistan	Aleksandra Kotlyarova; Anastasiya Viatkina
A standard – 14.30	1	Algeria	Baya Rahouli
A standard – 14.30	1	Brazil	Keila Costa
A standard – 14.30	1	Bulgaria	Andriana Banova
A standard – 14.30	1	Colombia	Caterine Ibargüen
A standard – 14.30	0*	Germany	~~Katja Demut~~
A standard – 14.30	1	Great Britain	Yamile Aldama
A standard – 14.30	1	Italy	Simona La Mantia
A standard – 14.30	1	Jamaica	Kimberley Williams
A standard – 14.30	1	Portugal	Patrícia Mamona
A standard – 14.30	1	Romania	Cristina Bujin
A standard – 14.30	1	Slovenia	Marija Sestak
B standard – 14.10	1	Belgium	Svetlana Bolshakova
B standard – 14.10	1	India	Mayookha Johny
B standard – 14.10	0*	Poland	~~Anna Jagaciak~~
B standard – 14.10	1	Serbia	Biljana Topić
B standard – 14.10	1	Spain	Patricia Sarrapio
B standard – 14.10	1	Trinidad and Tobago	Ayanna Alexander
B standard – 14.10	1	United States	Amanda Smock
Total	38		

=== Women's shot put ===
Qualification standard	No. of athletes	NOC	Qualified athletes
A standard – 18.30	3	Belarus	Nadzeya Ostapchuk; Natallia Mikhnevich; Yanina Karolchyk-Pravalinskaya
A standard – 18.30	3	China	Gong Lijiao; Li Ling; Liu Xiangrong
A standard – 18.30	3	Germany	Nadine Kleinert; Christina Schwanitz; Josephine Terlecki
A standard – 18.30	3	Russia	Yevgeniya Kolodko; Anna Avdeyeva; Irina Tarasova
A standard – 18.30	3	United States	Jillian Camarena-Williams; Michelle Carter; Tia Brooks
A standard – 18.30	2	Cuba	Mailín Vargas; Misleydis González
A standard – 18.30	1	Brazil	Geisa Arcanjo
A standard – 18.30	1	Canada	Julie Labonte
A standard – 18.30	1	Chile	Natalia Duco
A standard – 18.30	1	Hungary	Anita Márton
A standard – 18.30	1	Italy	Chiara Rosa
A standard – 18.30	1	Nigeria	Vivian Chukwuemeka
A standard – 18.30	1	New Zealand	Valerie Adams
A standard – 18.30	1	Trinidad and Tobago	Cleopatra Borel
A standard – 18.30	0*	Ukraine	~~Halyna Obleshchuk~~
B standard – 17.20	1	Bulgaria	Radoslava Mavrodieva
B standard – 17.20	1	Colombia	Sandra Lemos
B standard – 17.20	0*	France	~~Jessica Cérival~~
B standard – 17.20	1	Iran	Leyla Rajabi
B standard – 17.20	0*	Israel	~~Anastasia Muchkaev~~
B standard – 17.20	1	Kazakhstan	Alexandra Fisher
B standard – 17.20	0*	Netherlands	~~Melissa Boekelman~~
B standard – 17.20	0*	Poland	~~Paulina Guba~~
B standard – 17.20	1	Romania	Anca Heltne
B standard – 17.20	1	Spain	Úrsula Ruiz
B standard – 17.20	0*	Great Britain	~~Eden Francis~~
B standard – 17.20	1	Sweden	Helena Engman
B standard – 17.20	1	Chinese Taipei	Chia-Ying Lin
Total	37		

=== Women's discus throw ===
Qualification standard	No. of athletes	NOC	Qualified athletes
A standard – 62.00	3	China	Li Yanfeng; Ma Xuejun; Tan Jian
A standard – 62.00	3	Cuba	Yarelys Barrios; Denia Caballero; Yaimé Pérez
A standard – 62.00	3	Germany	Julia Fischer; Nadine Müller; Anna Rüh
A standard – 62.00	3	Russia	Darya Pishchalnikova; Vera Ganeeva; Svetlana Saykina
A standard – 62.00	3	United States	Stephanie Trafton; Gia Lewis-Smallwood; Aretha Thurmond
A standard – 62.00	2	India	Krishna Poonia; Seema Antil
A standard – 62.00	2	Ukraine	Kateryna Karsak; Nataliya Semonova
A standard – 62.00	1	Australia	Dani Samuels
A standard – 62.00	1	Brazil	Andressa de Morais
A standard – 62.00	1	Croatia	Sandra Perković
A standard – 62.00	1	Czech Republic	Věra Cechlová
A standard – 62.00	1	France	Mélina Robert-Michon
A standard – 62.00	1	Lithuania	Zinaida Sendriūtė
A standard – 62.00	1	Moldova	Natalia Artic
A standard – 62.00	1	Poland	Żaneta Glanc
A standard – 62.00	1	Portugal	Irina Rodrigues
A standard – 62.00	1	Romania	Nicoleta Grasu
A standard – 62.00	1	Serbia	Dragana Tomašević
A standard – 62.00	0*	Slovenia	~~Martina Ratej~~
B standard – 59.50	1	Argentina	Germán Lauro
B standard – 59.50	1	Belarus	Sviatlana Siarova
B standard – 59.50	1	Chile	Karen Gallardo
B standard – 59.50	1	Chinese Taipei	Li Wen-Hua
B standard – 59.50	0*	~~Great Britain~~	
B standard – 59.50	0*	~~Italy~~	
B standard – 59.50	1	Jamaica	Allison Randall
B standard – 59.50	1	Netherlands	Monique Jansen
Total	38		

=== Women's hammer throw ===
Qualification standard	No. of athletes	NOC	Qualified athletes
A standard – 71.50	3	Cuba	Yipsi Moreno; Arasay Thondike; Ariannis Vichy
A standard – 71.50	3	Russia	Tatyana Lysenko; Gulfiya Khanafeyeva; Mariya Bespalova
A standard – 71.50	2*	Ukraine	Iryna Novozhylova; Hanna Skydan
A standard – 71.50	3	United States	Amber Campbell; Amanda Bingson; Jessica Cosby
A standard – 71.50	2	Belarus	Alena Matoshka; Aksana Miankova
A standard – 71.50	2	Canada	Sultana Frizell; Heather Steacy
A standard – 71.50	2	Germany	Betty Heidler; Kathrin Klaas
A standard – 71.50	2	Italy	Silvia Salis
A standard – 71.50	2	Moldova	Marina Marghieva; Zalina Marghieva
A standard – 71.50	2	Poland	Joanna Fiodorow; Anita Włodarczyk
A standard – 71.50	2	Turkey	Tuğçe Şahutoğlu; Kıvılcım Kaya
A standard – 71.50	1	Argentina	Jennifer Dahlgren
A standard – 71.50	1	China	Zhang Wenxiu
A standard – 71.50	1	France	Stéphanie Falzon
A standard – 71.50	1	Great Britain	Sophie Hitchon
A standard – 71.50	1	Romania	Bianca Perie
A standard – 71.50	1	Slovakia	Martina Hrašnová
A standard – 71.50	1	Venezuela	Rosa Rodríguez
B standard – 69.00	1	Colombia	Ely Johana Moreno
B standard – 69.00	1	Czech Republic	Kateřina Šafránková
B standard – 69.00	1	Finland	Merja Korpela
B standard – 69.00	0*	~~Greece~~	
B standard – 69.00	1	Hungary	Éva Orbán
B standard – 69.00	0*	~~Norway~~	
B standard – 69.00	1	Portugal	Vânia Silva
B standard – 69.00	1	Senegal	Amy Sène
B standard – 69.00	1	Slovenia	Barbara Špiler
B standard – 69.00	1	Spain	Berta Castells
B standard – 69.00	0*	~~Sweden~~	
Total	40		

=== Women's javelin throw ===
Qualification standard	No. of athletes	NOC	Qualified athletes
A standard – 61.00	3	China	Lü Huihui; Li Lingwei; Zhang Li
A standard – 61.00	3	Germany	Katharina Molitor; Christina Obergföll; Linda Stahl
A standard – 61.00	3	Latvia	Madara Palameika; Līna Mūze; Sinta Ozoliņa-Kovala
A standard – 61.00	3	Ukraine	Vira Rebryk; Hanna Hatsko; Marharyta Dorozhon
A standard – 61.00	3	United States	Brittany Borman; Kara Patterson; Rachel Yurkovich
A standard – 61.00	2	Australia	Kim Mickle; Kathryn Mitchell
A standard – 61.00	2	Cuba	Yainelis Ribeaux; Yanet Cruz
A standard – 61.00	2	Czech Republic	Jarmila Klimesova; Barbora Špotáková
A standard – 61.00	2	South Africa	Sunette Viljoen; Justine Robbeson
A standard – 61.00	1	Canada	Elizabeth Gleadle
A standard – 61.00	1	Great Britain	Goldie Sayers
A standard – 61.00	1	Japan	Yuki Ebihara
A standard – 61.00	1	Russia	Maria Abakumova
A standard – 61.00	1	Slovenia	Martina Ratej
A standard – 61.00	1	Uzbekistan	Anastasiya Svechnikova
B standard – 59.00	1	Armenia	Kristine Harutyunyan
B standard – 59.00	1	Austria	Elisabeth Eberl
B standard – 59.00	1	Belarus	Maryna Novik
B standard – 59.00	1	Brazil	Laila Ferrer e Silva
B standard – 59.00	1	Colombia	Flor Ruiz
B standard – 59.00	1	Finland	Sanni Utriainen
B standard – 59.00	1	Greece	Sávva Líka
B standard – 59.00	1	Hungary	Vanda Juhász
B standard – 59.00	1	Iceland	Ásdís Hjálmsdóttir
B standard – 59.00	1	Italy	~~Zahra Bani~~
B standard – 59.00	1	Lithuania	Indré Jakubaityté
B standard – 59.00	1	Romania	Maria Nicoleta Negoita
B standard – 59.00	1	Serbia	Tatjana Jelača
B standard – 59.00	1	Spain	Nora Aída Bicet
B standard – 59.00	1	Venezuela	Yusbelys Parra
Universality	1	Paraguay	Leryn Franco
Total	40		

=== Women's heptathlon ===
Qualification standard	No. of athletes	NOC	Qualified athletes
A standard – 6150	3	Canada	Jessica Zelinka; Ruky Abdulai; Brianne Theisen
A standard – 6150	3	Great Britain	Jessica Ennis; Louise Hazel; Katarina Johnson-Thompson
A standard – 6150	3	Germany	Julia Mächtig; Jennifer Oeser; Lilli Schwarzkopf
A standard – 6150	3	Russia	Tatyana Chernova; Kristina Savitskaya; Olga Kurban
A standard – 6150	3	Ukraine	Natallia Dobrynska; Lyudmyla Yosypenko; Hanna Melnychenko
A standard – 6150	3	United States	Hyleas Fountain; Sharon Day; Chantae McMillan
A standard – 6150	2	France	Antoinette Nana Djimou Ida; Marisa De Aniceto
A standard – 6150	2	Netherlands	Nadine Broersen; Dafne Schippers
A standard – 6150	2	Latvia	Aiga Grabuste; Laura Ikauniece
A standard – 6150	1	Argentina	Agustina Zerboni
A standard – 6150	1	Czech Republic	Eliska Klucinova
A standard – 6150	1	Ghana	Margaret Simpson
A standard – 6150	1	Lithuania	Austra Skujytė
A standard – 6150	1	Poland	Karolina Tyminska
A standard – 6150	1	Sweden	Jessica Samuelsson
B standard – 5950	1	Austria	Ivona Dadic
B standard – 5950	1	Belarus	Yana Maksimava
B standard – 5950	1	Belgium	Sara Aerts
B standard – 5950	1	Estonia	Grit Sadeiko
B standard – 5950	1	Greece	Sofia Ifadidou
B standard – 5950	1	Hungary	Györgyi Farkas
B standard – 5950	1	Kazakhstan	Irina Karpova
B standard – 5950	1	New Zealand	Sarah Cowley
B standard – 5950	1	Nigeria	Uhunoma Osazuwa
B standard – 5950	1	Norway	Ida Marcussen
B standard – 5950	1	Switzerland	Ellen Sprunger
Total	42		

=== Women's 20 km race walk ===
Qualification standard	No. of athletes	NOC	Qualified athletes
A standard – 1:33:30	3	Australia	Regan Lamble; Beki Lee; Claire Tallent
A standard – 1:33:30	3	China	Liu Hong; Lu Xiuzhi; Qieyang Shijie
A standard – 1:33:30	3	Colombia	Sandra Arenas; Ingrid Hernández; Arabelly Orjuela
A standard – 1:33:30	3	Guatemala	Mirna Ortiz; Jamy Franco; Mayra Herrera
A standard – 1:33:30	2*	Italy	Eleonora Anna Giorgi; Elisa Rigaudo
A standard – 1:33:30	3	Japan	Masumi Fuchise; Mayumi Kawasaki; Kumi Otoshi
A standard – 1:33:30	3	Lithuania	Kristina Saltanovič; Brigita Virbalytė; Neringa Aidietytė
A standard – 1:33:30	3	Poland	Paulina Buziak; Agnieszka Dygacz; Agnieszka Szwarnóg
A standard – 1:33:30	3	Portugal	Ana Cabecinha; Inês Henriques; Vera Santos
A standard – 1:33:30	3	Russia	Olga Kaniskina; Yelena Lashmanova; Anisya Kirdyapkina
A standard – 1:33:30	3	Spain	Beatriz Pascual; María José Poves; María Vasco
A standard – 1:33:30	3	Ukraine	Nadiya Borovska; Olena Shumkina; Olha Yakovenko
A standard – 1:33:30	2	Belarus	Hanna Drabenia; Nastassia Yatsevich
A standard – 1:33:30	1*	Czech Republic	Lucie Pelantova; ~~Zuzana Schindlerova~~
A standard – 1:33:30	2	Ecuador	Yadira Guamán; Paola Pérez
A standard – 1:33:30	2	Germany	Melanie Seeger; Sabine Krantz
A standard – 1:33:30	2	Ireland	Olive Loughnane; Laura Reynolds
A standard – 1:33:30	2	Kazakhstan	Ayman Kozhakhmetova; Sholpan Kozhakhmetova
A standard – 1:33:30	0*	Brazil	~~Erica de Sena~~
A standard – 1:33:30	1	Canada	Rachel Seaman
A standard – 1:33:30	0*	~~France~~	
A standard – 1:33:30	1	Great Britain	Johanna Jackson
A standard – 1:33:30	1	Greece	Déspina Zapounídou
A standard – 1:33:30	1	Romania	Claudia Ștef
B standard – 1:38:00	1	Bolivia	Claudia Balderrama
B standard – 1:38:00	0*	~~Cuba~~	
B standard – 1:38:00	1	Finland	Anne Halkivaha
B standard – 1:38:00	1	Hungary	Viktória Madarász
B standard – 1:38:00	0*	~~Kenya~~	
B standard – 1:38:00	1	South Korea	Jeon Yong-Eun
B standard – 1:38:00	1	Latvia	Agnese Pastare
B standard – 1:38:00	1	Mexico	Mónica Equihua
B standard – 1:38:00	0*	~~Switzerland~~	
B standard – 1:38:00	1	Slovakia	Mária Czaková
B standard – 1:38:00	0*	~~Sweden~~	
B standard – 1:38:00	1	Turkey	Semiha Mutlu
B standard – 1:38:00	1	United States	Maria Michta
B standard – 1:38:00	1	Venezuela	Semiha Mutlu
B standard – 1:38:00	1	Vietnam	Nguyễn Thị Thanh Phúc
Total	64		

=== Women's 4x100 m relay ===
Qualification standard	No. of teams	Qualified teams
Top 16 teams	1 Team	United States; Jamaica; Ukraine; France; Germany; Nigeria; Netherlands; Russia; Brazil; Poland; Trinidad and Tobago; Colombia; Japan; Switzerland; Bahamas; Belarus

=== Women's 4x400 m relay ===
Qualification standard	No. of teams	Qualified teams
Top 16 teams	1 Team	United States; Russia; Jamaica; Great Britain; Ukraine; Belarus; Czech Republic; France; Nigeria; Cuba; Germany; Italy; Ireland; Brazil; Poland; Turkey
