= Kim Kwang-hyok (athlete) =

North Korean long-distance runner (born 1988)

Kim Kwang-Hyok
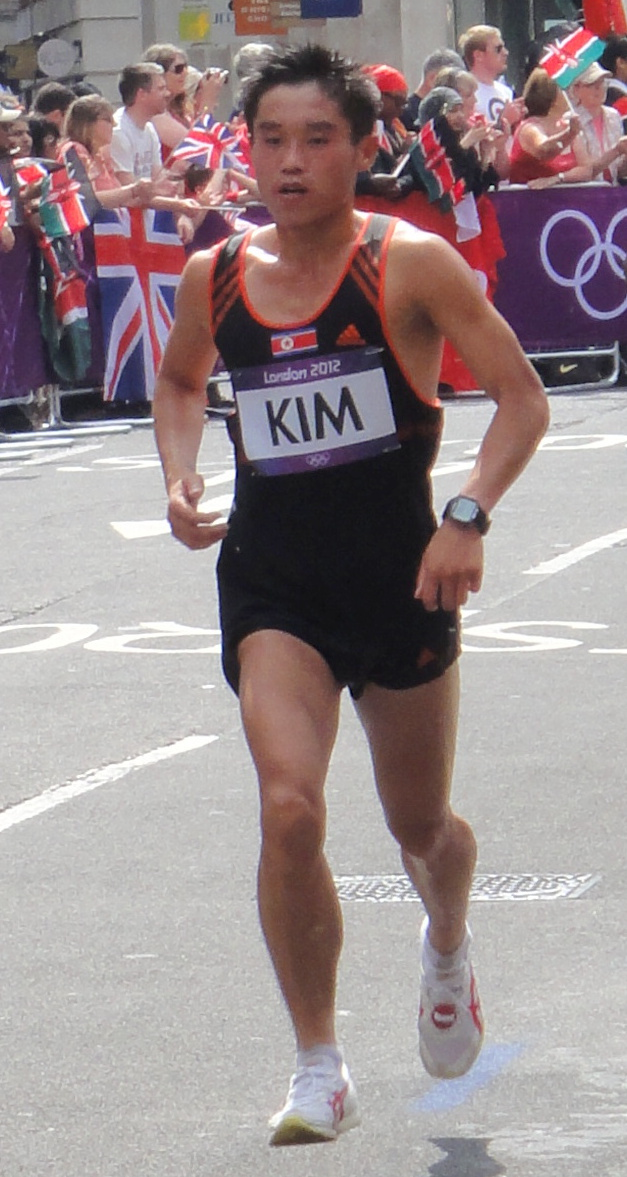
- Kim Kwang-Hyok in the marathon at the 2012 Olympics in London

Personal information
- Born: January 22, 1988 (age 37)
- Height: 1.65 m (5 ft 5 in)
- Weight: 53 kg (117 lb)

Sport
- Country: North Korea
- Sport: Athletics
- Event: Marathon

- Kim Kwang-hyok
- Hangul: 김광혁
- RR: Gim Gwanghyeok
- MR: Kim Kwanghyŏk

Kim Kwang-Hyok (Korean: 김광혁; born January 22, 1988) is a North Korean long-distance runner. He was born in Nampo. At the 2012 Summer Olympics, he competed in the Men's marathon, finishing in 53rd place.
