= Athletics at the 2012 Summer Olympics – Men's marathon =

Men's marathon at the Games of the XXX Olympiad
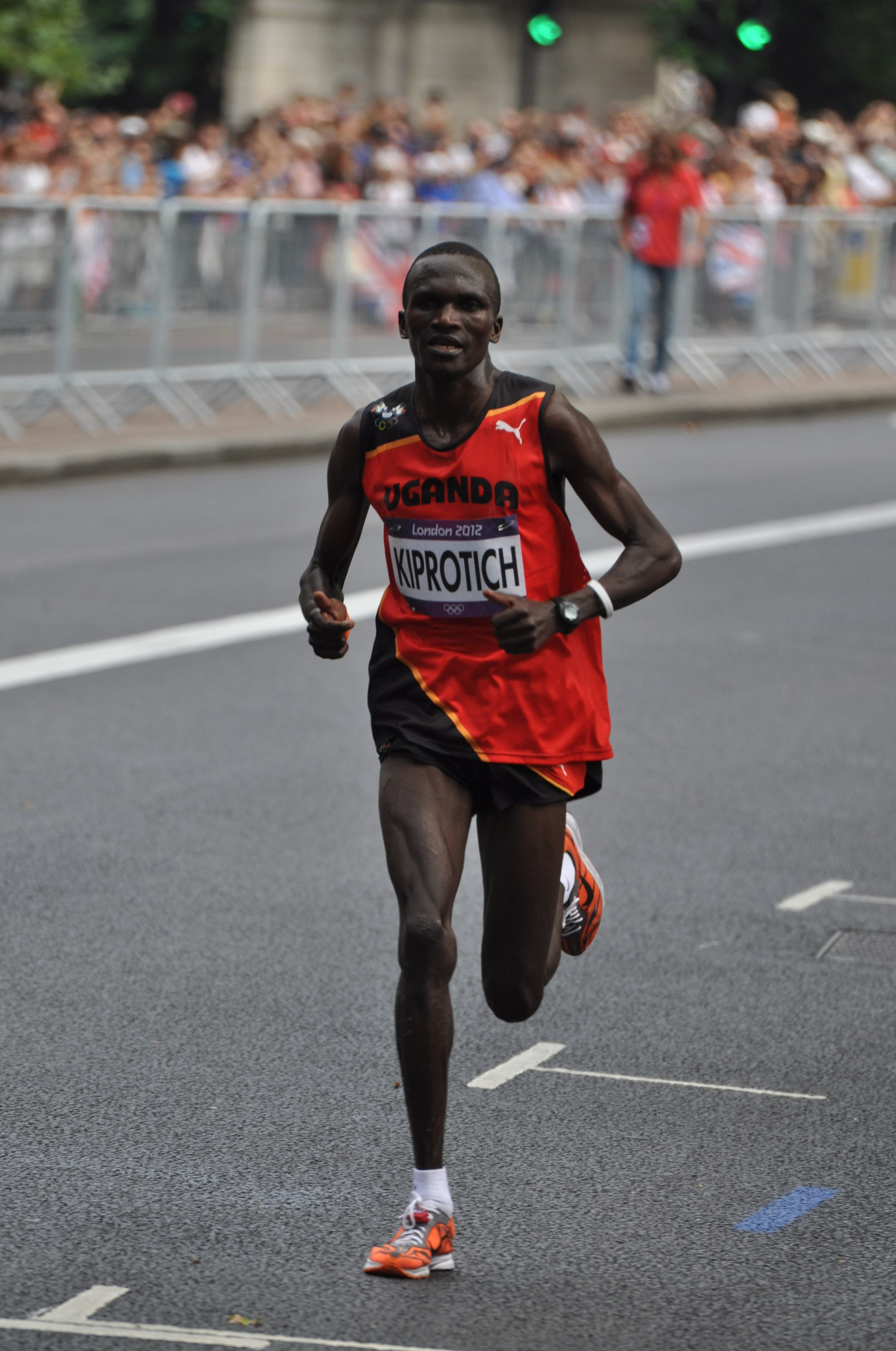
- Winner Stephen Kiprotich near the end of the course.
- Venue: Marathon course, central London
- Date: 12 August
- Competitors: 105 from 67 nations
- Winning time: 2:08:01

Medalists
1st place, gold medalist(s)		Stephen Kiprotich; Uganda
2nd place, silver medalist(s)		Abel Kirui; Kenya
3rd place, bronze medalist(s)		Wilson Kipsang; Kenya

Official Video

The men's marathon at the 2012 Olympic Games in London took place on the Olympic marathon street course on 12 August, the final day of the Games. One hundred and five athletes from 67 nations competed. The event was won by Stephen Kiprotich of Uganda, the nation's first Olympic men's marathon victory and the nation's only medal in 2012. Kenya earned its fourth and fifth medals in the event in five Games, with Abel Kirui's silver and Wilson Kipsang's bronze.

As is customary, the men's marathon medals were presented as part of the Closing Ceremony, which took place later that day, in the Olympic Stadium – the last medal presentation of the Games.

== Summary ==
Stephen Kiprotich from Uganda won the gold medal — the country's only medal at the 2012 Games. Abel Kirui and Wilson Kipsang, both from Kenya, took silver and bronze respectively. Twenty athletes did not finish the race, which took place on a warm and sunny day.

The race started off slowly. In the first 5 miles (8.0 km), Brazilian runner Franck Caldeira broke away on two occasions, only to get swallowed up by the pack. Between 10K and 12K, Wilson Kipsang Kiprotich moved to the front in a more serious breakaway. The large pack broke up into a small chase pack of eight, primarily East African, runners. With a fast 7 miles (11 km), Kipsang Kiprotich opened up a gap of about 15 seconds, which lasted for the next 10 miles but never increased significantly. The chase group shrunk to Abel Kirui and Stephen Kiprotich, with Ayele Abshero just behind. While Abshero did not gain contact, the other three formed a lead pack. The two Kenyan teammates ran together, with the Ugandan trailing slightly. By 35K, the group of three had over a minute gap on the next competitor, Marilson dos Santos. At the 22 miles (35 km) marker, Kiprotich touched his leg as if he were struggling and he fell back a few seconds. At the 23 miles (37 km) marker, Kiprotich moved past the two Kenyans. His next mile was 4:42, opening up a 17-second gap on Kirui, with Kipsang falling back. Kiprotich extended his lead by 9 seconds and picked up a Ugandan flag before crossing the finish line.

== Background ==
This was the 27th appearance of the event, which is one of 12 athletics events to have been held at every Summer Olympics. Returning runners from the 2008 marathon included sixth-place finisher Viktor Röthlin of Switzerland, eighth-place finisher Yared Asmerom of Eritrea, and tenth-place finisher Ryan Hall of the United States. The 2004 silver medalist Meb Keflezighi of the United States, who had not competed in Beijing, also returned. Abel Kirui of Kenya had won the past two world championships in 2009 and 2011. His countryman Patrick Makau Musyoki had set the world record in 2011, but could not finish the 2012 London Marathon due to injury and was not selected for the Kenyan team. Wilson Kipsang and Emmanuel Mutai joined Kirui on the Kenyan team instead; Kipsang was the favorite in the hundred-plus runner field.

Iceland made its first appearance in Olympic men's marathons. South Sudan had one runner appear as an Independent Olympic Athlete. The United States made its 26th appearance, most of any nation, having missed only the boycotted 1980 Games in Moscow.

== Competition format and course ==
As all Olympic marathons, the competition was a single race. The marathon distance of 26 miles, 385 yards was run over a course that started and finished on The Mall in central London. Runners completed one short circuit of 2.219 miles (3.571 km) around part of the City of Westminster and then three longer circuits of 8 miles (13 km) around Westminster, the Victoria Embankment and the City of London. The course was designed to pass many of London's best-known landmarks, including Buckingham Palace, Trafalgar Square, St Paul's Cathedral, the Bank of England, Leadenhall Market, the Monument, the Tower of London and the Houses of Parliament.

== Records ==
Prior to this event, the existing world and Olympic records stood as follows.

World record	Patrick Makau Musyoki (KEN)	2:03:38	Berlin, Germany	25 September 2011
Olympic record	Samuel Wanjiru (KEN)	2:06:32	Beijing, China	24 August 2008

No new world or Olympic records were set during the competition.

== Schedule ==
All times are British Summer Time (UTC+1)

Date	Time	Round
Sunday, 12 August 2012	11:00	Final

== Results ==
Rank	Athlete	Nation	Time	Notes
1st place, gold medalist(s)	Stephen Kiprotich	Uganda	2:08:01	
2nd place, silver medalist(s)	Abel Kirui	Kenya	2:08:27	
3rd place, bronze medalist(s)	Wilson Kipsang Kiprotich	Kenya	2:09:37	
4	Meb Keflezighi	United States	2:11:06	
5	Marílson Gomes dos Santos	Brazil	2:11:10	
6	Kentaro Nakamoto	Japan	2:11:16	
7	Cuthbert Nyasango	Zimbabwe	2:12:08	PB
8	Paulo Roberto Paula	Brazil	2:12:17	
9	Henryk Szost	Poland	2:12:28	
10	Ruggero Pertile	Italy	2:12:45	
11	Viktor Röthlin	Switzerland	2:12:48	
12	Oleksandr Sitkovskyy	Ukraine	2:12:56	SB
13	Franck De Almeida	Brazil	2:13:35	
14	Aleksey Reunkov	Russia	2:13:49	
15	Wirimai Juwawo	Zimbabwe	2:14:09	SB
16	Michael Shelley	Australia	2:14:10	
17	Emmanuel Kipchirchir Mutai	Kenya	2:14:49	
18	Rachid Kisri	Morocco	2:15:09	
19	Yared Asmerom	Eritrea	2:15:24	
20	Dylan Wykes	Canada	2:15:26	
21	Raúl Pacheco	Peru	2:15:35	
22	Eric Gillis	Canada	2:16:00	
23	Dmitriy Safronov	Russia	2:16:04	
24	Carles Castillejo	Spain	2:16:17	
25	Iaroslav Musinschi	Moldova	2:16:25	
26	Marius Ionescu	Romania	2:16:28	
27	Reid Coolsaet	Canada	2:16:29	
28	Martin Dent	Australia	2:16:29	SB
29	Vitaliy Shafar	Ukraine	2:16:36	
30	Lee Merrien	Great Britain	2:17:00	
31	Ignacio Cáceres	Spain	2:17:11	
32	Lee Duhaeng	South Korea	2:17:19	
33	Faustine Mussa	Tanzania	2:17:39	
34	José Carlos Hernández	Spain	2:17:48	
35	Miguel Barzola	Argentina	2:17:54	
36	Urige Buta	Norway	2:17:58	
37	Grigoriy Andreev	Russia	2:18:20	
38	José Amado García	Guatemala	2:18:23	
39	Daniel Vargas	Mexico	2:18:26	
40	Ryo Yamamoto	Japan	2:18:34	
41	Jesper Faurschou	Denmark	2:18:44	
42	Kári Steinn Karlsson	Iceland	2:18:47	
43	Lusapho April	South Africa	2:19:00	
44	Mike Tebulo	Malawi	2:19:11	SB
45	Arata Fujiwara	Japan	2:19:11	
46	Primoz Kobe	Slovenia	2:19:28	
47	Guor Marial	Independent Olympic Athletes	2:19:32	
48	Luis Feiteira	Portugal	2:19:40	SB
49	Stephen Mokoka	South Africa	2:19:52	
50	Miguel Ángel Almachi	Ecuador	2:19:53	
51	Ser-Od Bat-Ochir	Mongolia	2:20:10	
52	Pak Song-Chol	North Korea	2:20:20	
53	Kim Kwang-Hyok	North Korea	2:20:20	
54	Dong Guojian	China	2:20:39	
55	Anuradha Cooray	Sri Lanka	2:20:41	
56	Methkal Abu Drais	Jordan	2:21:00	
57	Mark Kenneally	Ireland	2:21:13	
58	Yonas Kifle	Eritrea	2:21:25	
59	Ivan Babaryka	Ukraine	2:21:52	
60	Carlos Cordero	Mexico	2:22:08	
61	Scott Overall	Great Britain	2:22:37	
62	Pedro Mora	Venezuela	2:22:40	
63	Jeff Hunt	Australia	2:22:59	
64	Stsiapan Rahautsou	Belarus	2:23:23	
65	César Lizano	Costa Rica	2:24:16	
66	Samson Ramadhani	Tanzania	2:24:53	SB
67	Jan Kreisinger	Czech Republic	2:25:03	
68	Mohammed Abduh Bakhet	Qatar	2:25:17	
69	Jussi Utriainen	Finland	2:26:25	
70	Arturo Malaquias	Mexico	2:26:37	
71	Wissem Hosni	Tunisia	2:26:43	
72	Tamás Kovács	Hungary	2:27:48	
73	Jang Sinkweon	South Korea	2:28:20	
74	Toni Bernadó	Andorra	2:28:34	
75	Marcel Tschopp	Liechtenstein	2:28:54	
76	Bekir Karayel	Turkey	2:29:38	
77	Chang Chia-Che	Chinese Taipei	2:29:58	
78	Ram Singh Yadav	India	2:30:06	
79	Jean Pierre Mvuyekure	Rwanda	2:30:19	
80	Konstantinos Poulios	Greece	2:33:17	
81	Zohar Zimro	Israel	2:34:59	
82	Jeong Jinhyeok	South Korea	2:38:45	
83	Juan Carlos Cardona	Colombia	2:40:13	
84	Augusto Soares	Timor-Leste	2:45:09	
85	Tsepo Ramonene	Lesotho	2:55:54	
—	Li Zicheng	China	DNF	
—	Ilunga Mande Zatara	Democratic Republic of the Congo	DNF	
—	Darko Zivanovic	Serbia	DNF	
—	Gunther Weidlinger	Austria	DNF	
—	Abraham Kiprotich	France	DNF	
—	Patrick Tambwé	France	DNF	
—	Valerijs Zolnerovics	Latvia	DNF	
—	Ali Mabrouk El Zaidi	Libya	DNF	
—	Ryan Hall	United States	DNF	
—	Abdihakem Abdirahman	United States	DNF	
—	Getu Feleke	Ethiopia	DNF	
—	Dino Sefir	Ethiopia	DNF	
—	Samuel Tsegay	Eritrea	DNF	
—	Ayele Abshero	Ethiopia	DNF	
—	Tayeb Filali	Algeria	DNF	
—	Rui Pedro Silva	Portugal	DNF	
—	Coolboy Ngamole	South Africa	DNF	
—	Abderrahime Bouramdane	Morocco	DNF	DSQ
—	Roman Prodius	Moldova	DNF	
—	Abdellatif Meftah	France	DNF	
