= José Carlos Hernández =

Spanish long-distance runner

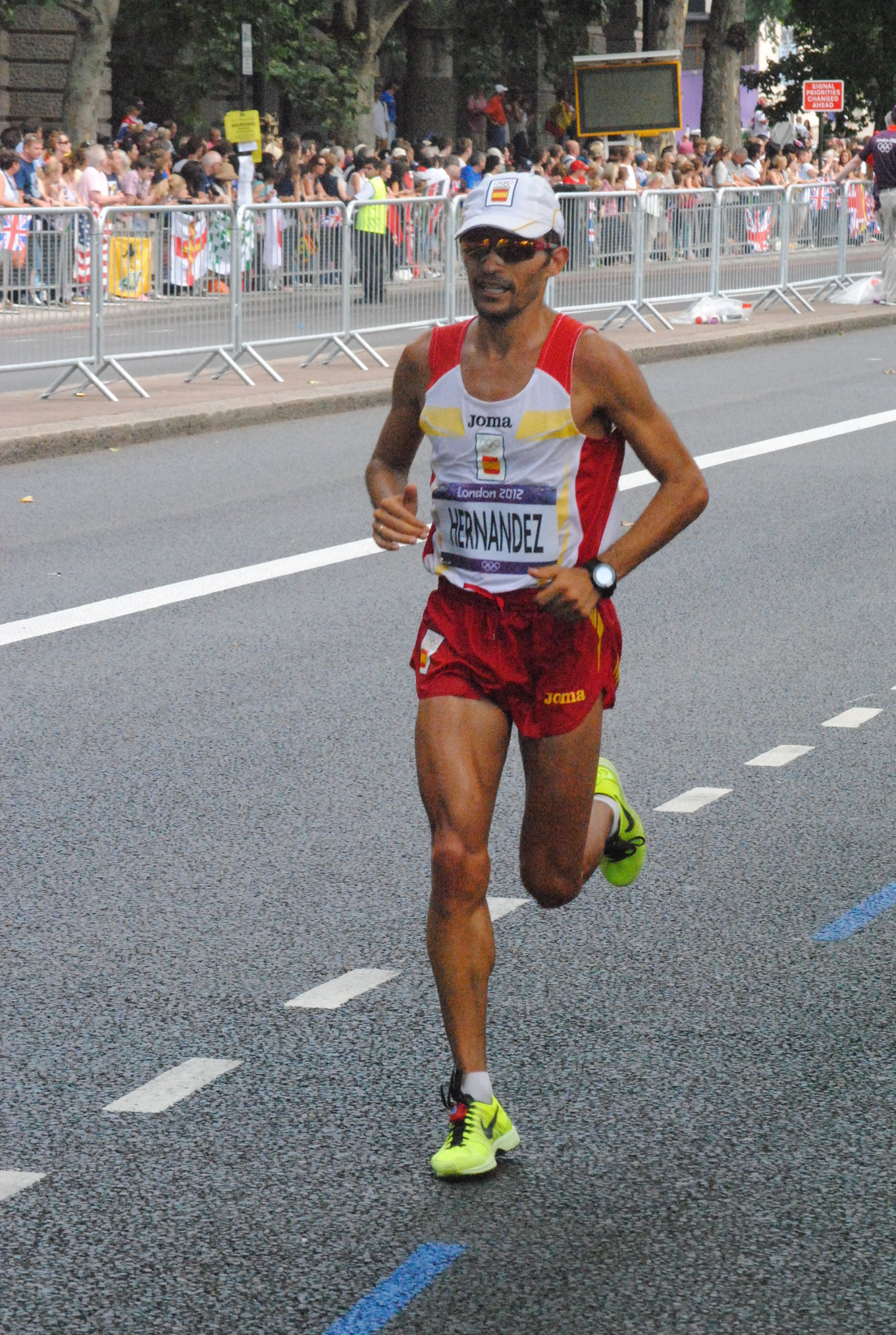
- Hernández in the marathon at the 2012 Olympics in London

Personal information
- Born: March 17, 1978 (age 48)
- Height: 1.75 m (5 ft 9 in)
- Weight: 70 kg (150 lb)

Sport
- Country: Spain
- Sport: Athletics
- Event: Marathon

José Carlos Hernández is a Spanish long-distance runner. At the 2012 Summer Olympics, he competed in the Men's marathon, finishing in 34th place.
