= Ryo Yamamoto =

Japanese long-distance runner

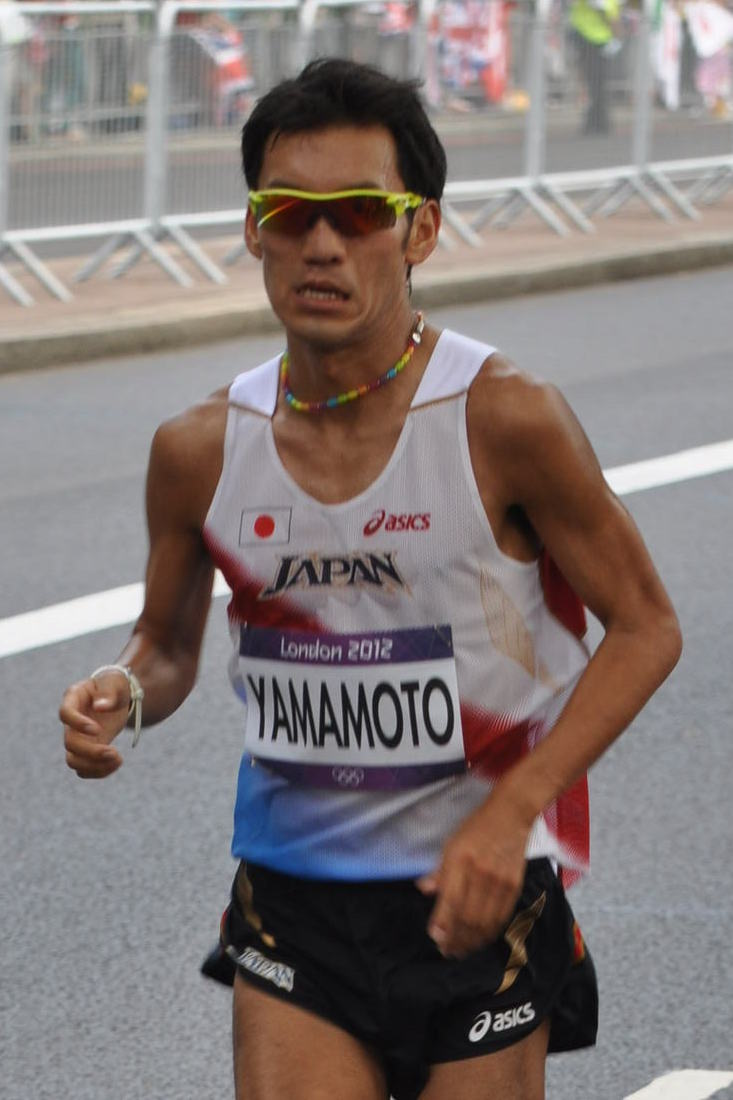
- Yamamoto in the marathon at the 2012 Summer Olympics in London

Personal information
- Born: 18 May 1984 (age 41)
- Height: 1.73 m (5 ft 8 in)
- Weight: 60 kg (130 lb)

Sport
- Country: Japan
- Sport: Athletics
- Event: Marathon

Ryo Yamamoto (山本 亮, Yamamoto Ryō; born 18 May 1984) is a Japanese long-distance runner. At the 2012 Summer Olympics, he competed in the Men's marathon, finishing in 40th place.
