= Tamás Kovács (athlete) =

Hungarian long-distance runner

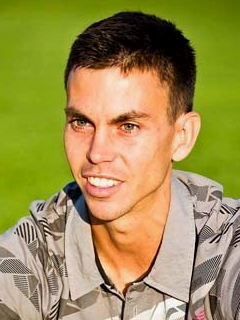
- Tamás Kovács in 2012

Personal information
- Born: September 18, 1983 (age 42)
- Height: 1.79 m (5 ft 10 1/2 in)
- Weight: 62 kg (137 lb)

Sport
- Country: Hungary
- Sport: Athletics
- Event: Marathon

Tamás Kovács (born 18 September 1983 in Hódmezővásárhely) is a Hungarian long-distance runner. He competed in the marathon at the 2012 Summer Olympics, placing 72nd with a time of 2:27:48.

Kovacs has a career best of 2:14:23 in the marathon, which he set in Italy in 2011. He has also run under 1:04 twice in the half marathon.

Kovacs attended High Point University in North Carolina, USA, where he competed in cross country and track & field from 2005 to 2008. He set HPU records in the 3,000-meter, 5,000-meter and 10,000-meter and was 2008 Big South Conference champion in the 10,000-meter.
