= Franck de Almeida =

Brazilian marathon runner

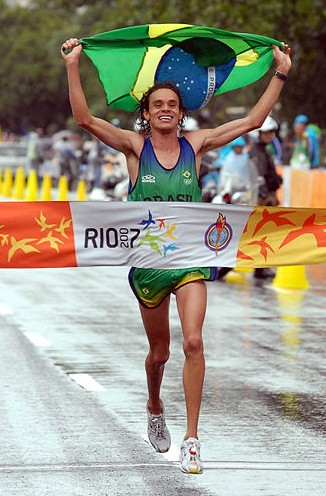
- De Almeida wins the marathon race of the 2007 Pan Am Games

Personal information
- Born: February 6, 1983 (age 43)
- Height: 1.73 m (5 ft 8 in)
- Weight: 49 kg (108 lb)

Sport
- Country: Brazil
- Sport: Athletics
- Event: Marathon
Medal record
Pan American Games
| Gold medal – first place | 2007 Rio de Janeiro | Marathon |

Franck Caldeira de Almeida (born February 6, 1983, in Sete Lagoas) is a marathon athlete from Brazil. He won the gold medal in the men's marathon at the 2007 Pan American Games in Rio de Janeiro, Brazil and the worldwide famous São Silvestre Road Race, in São Paulo, 2006.

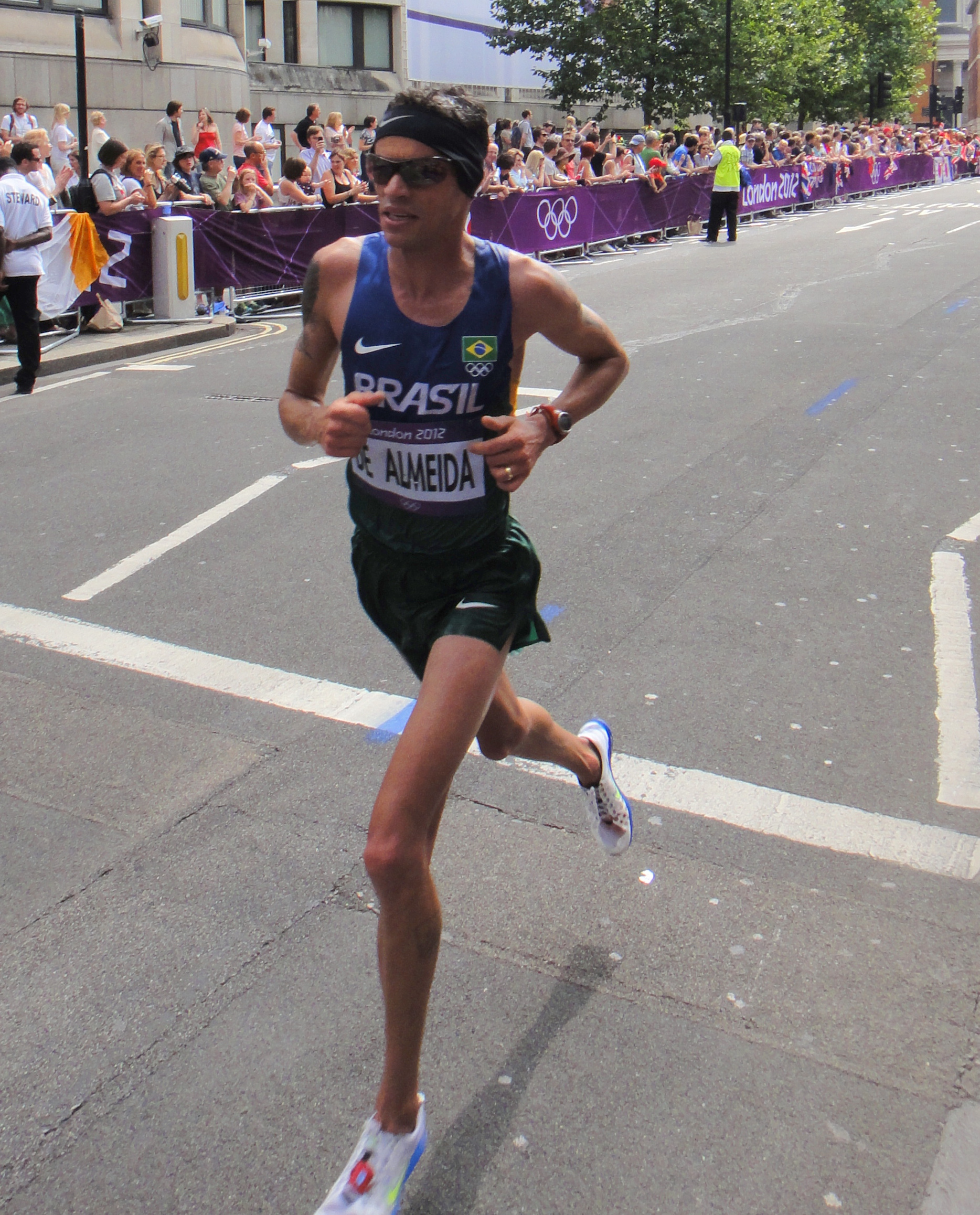
Franck De Almeida in the marathon at the 2012 Olympics in London
