= Jeong Jin-hyeok =

South Korean long-distance runner

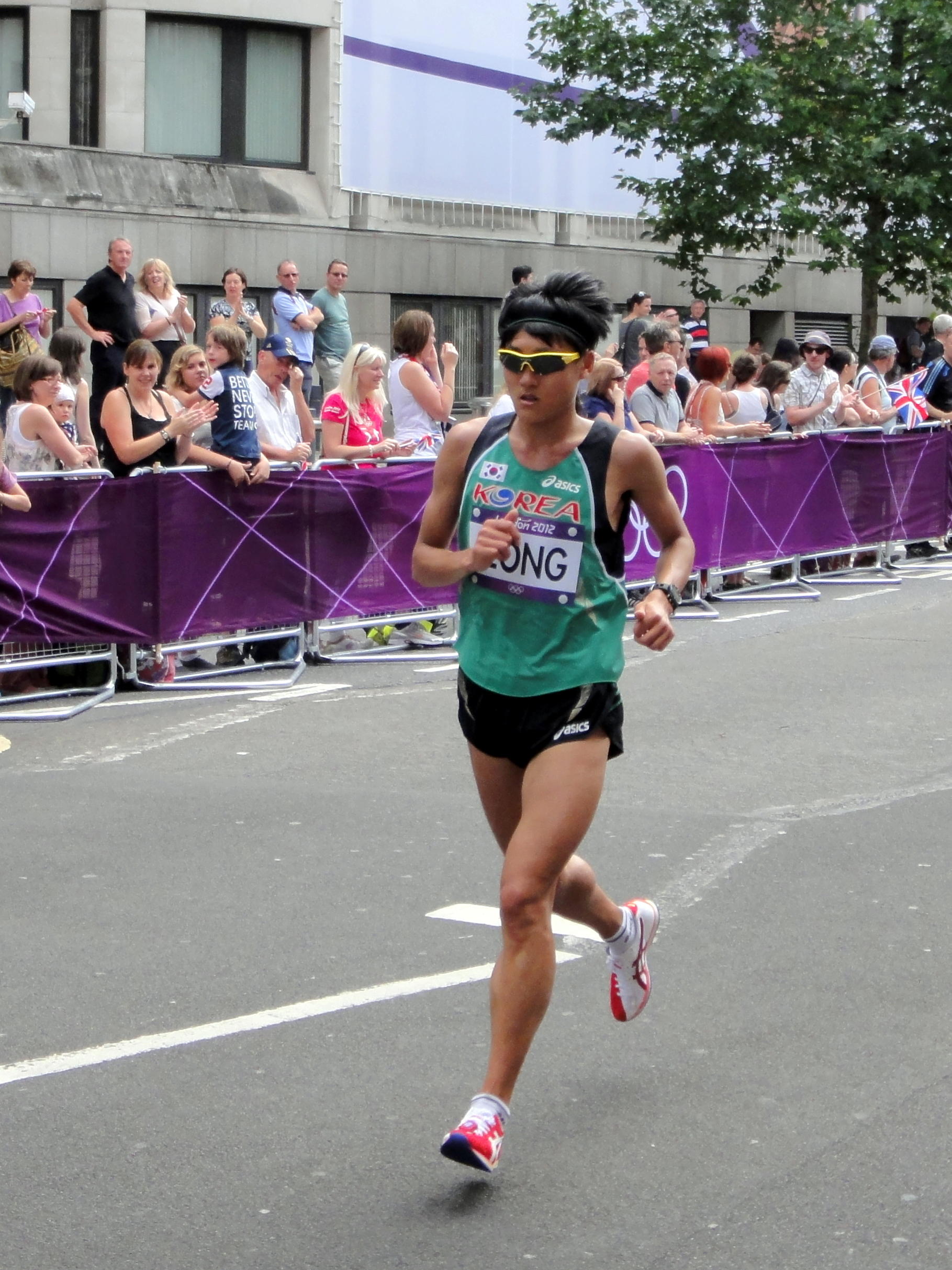
- Jeong Jin-hyeok in the marathon at the 2012 Olympics in London

Personal information
- Born: June 1, 1991 (age 34)
- Height: 1.7 m (5 ft 7 in)
- Weight: 58 kg (128 lb)

Korean name
- Hangul: 정진혁
- RR: Jeong Jinhyeok
- MR: Chŏng Chinhyŏk

Sport
- Country: South Korea
- Sport: Athletics
- Event: Marathon

Jeong Jin-hyeok (born June 1, 1991, Chungcheongnam) is a South Korean long-distance runner. At the 2012 Summer Olympics, he competed in the Men's marathon, finishing in 82nd place.

He won a surprise silver medal at the 2011 Seoul International Marathon.
