= Athletics at the 2012 Summer Olympics =

Coordinates: 51.5386°N 0.0164°W

Athletics at the Games of the XXX Olympiad
- Venue: Olympic Stadium
- Dates: 3–12 August 2012
- Competitors: 2,231 (1,160 men, 1,071 women)

The athletics competitions at the 2012 Olympic Games in London were held during the last 10 days of the Games, on 3–12 August. Track and field events took place at the Olympic Stadium in east London. The road events, however, started and finished on The Mall in central London.

Over 2,000 athletes from 201 nations competed in 47 events in total, with both men and women having a very similar schedule of events. Men competed in 24 events and women in 23, of which 21 were the same for both. The women's schedule lacked the 50 km race walk and included 100 m hurdles and heptathlon as opposed to the men's 110 m hurdles and decathlon. The youngest participant in the athletics competition was Andorran 15-year-old Cristina Llovera while the oldest was 46-year-old Ukrainian Oleksandr Dryhol. South African Oscar Pistorius became the first amputee sprinter to compete at the Olympics.

== Competition schedule ==
The venue for the track and field events was the Olympic Stadium while the walks and the marathons started and finished on The Mall. In the tables below, M stands for morning and A for afternoon.

Legend
P	Preliminary round	Q	Qualification	H	Heats	½	Semi-finals	F	Final

Men
Date →	3 Aug		4 Aug			5 Aug			6 Aug		7 Aug		8 Aug			9 Aug		10 Aug		11 Aug		12 Aug	
Event ↓	M	A	M		A	M	A		M	A	M	A	M	A		M	A	M	A	M	A	M	A
100 m			Q	H			1/2	F															
200 m											H			1/2			F						
400 m			H				1/2			F													
800 m									H			1/2					F						
1500 m		H					1/2					F											
5000 m													H								F		
10,000 m					F																		
110 m hurdles											H			1/2	F								
400 m hurdles	H				1/2					F													
3000 m steeplechase	H						F																
4 × 100 m relay																			H		F		
4 × 400 m relay																H			F				
Marathon																						F	
20 km walk					F																		
50 km walk																				F			
Long jump		Q			F																		
Triple jump											Q						F						
High jump							Q					F											
Pole vault														Q					F				
Shot put	Q	F																					
Discus throw									Q			F											
Javelin throw														Q							F		
Hammer throw	Q						F																
Decathlon													F										

Women
Date →	3 Aug		4 Aug			5 Aug		6 Aug		7 Aug			8 Aug		9 Aug		10 Aug		11 Aug		12 Aug	
Event ↓	M	A	M	A		M	A	M	A	M	A		M	A	M	A	M	A	M	A	M	A
100 m		H		1/2	F																	
200 m									H		1/2			F								
400 m	H			1/2			F															
800 m													H			1/2				F		
1500 m								H						1/2				F				
5000 m										H								F				
10,000 m		F																				
100 m hurdles								H			1/2	F										
400 m hurdles							H		1/2					F								
3000 m steeplechase			H						F													
4 × 100 m relay																H		F				
4 × 400 m relay																		H		F		
Marathon						F																
20 km walk																				F		
Long jump											Q			F								
Triple jump	Q						F															
High jump															Q					F		
Pole vault				Q					F													
Shot put								Q	F													
Discus throw		Q		F																		
Javelin throw										Q						F						
Hammer throw													Q					F				
Heptathlon	F																					

== Medal summary ==
(WR = World Record, OR = Olympic Record)

=== Medal table ===
Rank	Nation	Gold	Silver	Bronze	Total
1	United States	11	10	8	29
2	Jamaica	4	5	4	13
3	Great Britain	4	2	0	6
4	Ethiopia	3	3	2	8
5	Kenya	2	4	7	13
6	China	2	4	4	10
7	Australia	2	1	0	3
8	Poland	2	0	0	2
9	Germany	1	5	2	8
10	Russia	1	2	2	5
11	Trinidad and Tobago	1	1	2	4
12	Czech Republic	1	1	1	3
12	France	1	1	1	3
14	Dominican Republic	1	1	0	2
15	Algeria	1	0	0	1
15	Bahamas	1	0	0	1
15	Bahrain	1	0	0	1
15	Croatia	1	0	0	1
15	Grenada	1	0	0	1
15	Hungary	1	0	0	1
15	Kazakhstan	1	0	0	1
15	New Zealand	1	0	0	1
15	South Africa	1	0	0	1
15	Tunisia	1	0	0	1
15	Uganda	1	0	0	1
26	Cuba	0	1	2	3
27	Botswana	0	1	0	1
27	Canada	0	1	0	1
27	Colombia	0	1	0	1
27	Finland	0	1	0	1
27	Guatemala	0	1	0	1
27	Iran	0	1	0	1
27	Qatar	0	1	0	1
27	Slovenia	0	1	0	1
35	Ukraine	0	0	3	3
36	Estonia	0	0	1	1
36	Ireland	0	0	1	1
36	Italy	0	0	1	1
36	Japan	0	0	1	1
36	Lithuania	0	0	1	1
36	Morocco	0	0	1	1
36	Puerto Rico	0	0	1	1
36	Spain	0	0	1	1
Totals (43 entries)		47	49	46	142

Note: Three competitors tied for silver in the men's high jump event.

=== Men ===
Event	Gold		Silver		Bronze	
100 metres	Usain Bolt; Jamaica	9.63 (OR)	Yohan Blake; Jamaica	9.75	Justin Gatlin; United States	9.79
200 metres	Usain Bolt; Jamaica	19.32	Yohan Blake; Jamaica	19.44	Warren Weir; Jamaica	19.84
400 metres	Kirani James; Grenada	43.94	Luguelín Santos; Dominican Republic	44.46	Lalonde Gordon; Trinidad and Tobago	44.52
800 metres	David Rudisha; Kenya	1:40.91 (WR)	Nijel Amos; Botswana	1:41.73	Timothy Kitum; Kenya	1:42.53
1500 metres	Taoufik Makhloufi; Algeria	3:34.08	Leonel Manzano; United States	3:34.79	Abdalaati Iguider; Morocco	3:35.13
5000 metres	Mo Farah; Great Britain	13:41.66	Dejen Gebremeskel; Ethiopia	13:41.98	Thomas Longosiwa; Kenya	13:42.36
10,000 metres	Mo Farah; Great Britain	27:30.42	Galen Rupp; United States	27:30.90	Tariku Bekele; Ethiopia	27:31.43
110 metres hurdles	Aries Merritt; United States	12.92	Jason Richardson; United States	13.04	Hansle Parchment; Jamaica	13.12
400 metres hurdles	Félix Sánchez; Dominican Republic	47.63	Michael Tinsley; United States	47.91	Javier Culson; Puerto Rico	48.10
3000 metres steeplechase	Ezekiel Kemboi; Kenya	8:18.56	Mahiedine Benabbad; France	8:19.08	Abel Mutai; Kenya	8:19.73
4 × 100 metres relay^{[a]}	Jamaica; Nesta Carter; Michael Frater; Yohan Blake; Usain Bolt; Kemar Bailey-Cole*	36.84 (WR)	Trinidad and Tobago; Keston Bledman; Marc Burns; Emmanuel Callender; Richard Thompson	38.12	France; Jimmy Vicaut; Christophe Lemaitre; Pierre-Alexis Pessonneaux; Ronald Pognon	38.16
4 × 400 metres relay	Bahamas; Chris Brown; Demetrius Pinder; Michael Mathieu; Ramon Miller	2:56.72	United States; Bryshon Nellum; Joshua Mance; Tony McQuay; Angelo Taylor; Manteo Mitchell*	2:57.05	Trinidad and Tobago; Lalonde Gordon; Jarrin Solomon; Ade Alleyne-Forte; Deon Lendore	2:59.40
Marathon	Stephen Kiprotich; Uganda	2:08:01	Abel Kirui; Kenya	2:08:27	Wilson Kipsang Kiprotich; Kenya	2:09:37
20 kilometres walk	Chen Ding; China	1:18:46 (OR)	Érick Barrondo; Guatemala	1:18:57	Wang Zhen; China	1:19:25
50 kilometres walk^{[b]}	Jared Tallent; Australia	3:36:53 (OR)	Si Tianfeng; China	3:37:16	Robert Heffernan; Ireland	3:37:54
High jump^{[c]}	Erik Kynard; United States	2.33	Mutaz Essa Barshim; Qatar; Derek Drouin; Canada; Robert Grabarz; Great Britain	2.29	not awarded (tie for silver)	
Pole vault	Renaud Lavillenie; France	5.97 (OR)	Björn Otto; Germany	5.91	Raphael Holzdeppe; Germany	5.91
Long jump	Greg Rutherford; Great Britain	8.31	Mitchell Watt; Australia	8.16	Will Claye; United States	8.12
Triple jump	Christian Taylor; United States	17.81	Will Claye; United States	17.62	Fabrizio Donato; Italy	17.48
Shot put	Tomasz Majewski; Poland	21.89	David Storl; Germany	21.86	Reese Hoffa; United States	21.23
Discus throw	Robert Harting; Germany	68.27	Ehsan Haddadi; Iran	68.18	Gerd Kanter; Estonia	68.03
Hammer throw	Krisztián Pars; Hungary	80.59	Primož Kozmus; Slovenia	79.36	Koji Murofushi; Japan	78.71
Javelin throw^{[d]}	Keshorn Walcott; Trinidad and Tobago	84.58	Antti Ruuskanen; Finland	84.12	Vítězslav Veselý; Czech Republic	83.34
Decathlon	Ashton Eaton; United States	8869	Trey Hardee; United States	8671	Leonel Suárez; Cuba	8523

*Indicates the athlete only competed in the preliminary heats.

- ^{4 × 100 metres relay} Tyson Gay was stripped of his silver medal due to a doping violation. The United States team was disqualified.
- ^{50 kilometres walk} On 24 March 2016, the Court of Arbitration for Sport has issued decision that all competitive results obtained by Sergey Kirdyapkin of Russia from 20 August 2009 to 15 October 2012 are disqualified for doping use. Redistribution of the medals in this event occurred on 17 June 2016, with Tallent awarded the gold medal by the IOC at a ceremony in Melbourne, Australia, with Si claiming silver and Heffernan bronze.
- ^{high jump} Gold medalist Ivan Ukhov of Russia was disqualified for doping in 2019. Medals were reallocated in 2021.
- ^{javelin throw} Original silver medalist Oleksandr Pyatnytsya of Ukraine was stripped of his silver medal and result following a positive finding in a retest of his 2012 anti-doping sample. On 24 February 2017 Antti Ruuskanen received the silver medal in Finland. On 28 June 2017 Vítězslav Veselý received the bronze medal in Czech Republic.

=== Women ===
Event	Gold		Silver		Bronze	
100 metres	Shelly-Ann Fraser-Pryce; Jamaica	10.75	Carmelita Jeter; United States	10.78	Veronica Campbell-Brown; Jamaica	10.81
200 metres	Allyson Felix; United States	21.88	Shelly-Ann Fraser-Pryce; Jamaica	22.09	Carmelita Jeter; United States	22.14
400 metres	Sanya Richards-Ross; United States	49.55	Christine Ohuruogu; Great Britain	49.70	DeeDee Trotter; United States	49.72
800 metres^{[e]}	Caster Semenya; South Africa	1:57.23	Pamela Jelimo; Kenya	1:57.59	Alysia Johnson Montano; United States	1:57.93
1500 metres^{[f]}	Maryam Yusuf Jamal; Bahrain	4:10.74	Abeba Aregawi; Ethiopia	4:11.03	Shannon Rowbury; United States	4:11.26
5000 metres	Meseret Defar; Ethiopia	15:04.25	Vivian Cheruiyot; Kenya	15:04.73	Tirunesh Dibaba; Ethiopia	15:05.15
10,000 metres	Tirunesh Dibaba; Ethiopia	30:20.75	Sally Kipyego; Kenya	30:26.37	Vivian Cheruiyot; Kenya	30:30.44
100 metres hurdles	Sally Pearson; Australia	12.35 (OR)	Dawn Harper; United States	12.37	Kellie Wells; United States	12.48
400 metres hurdles^{[k]}	Lashinda Demus; United States	52.77	Zuzana Hejnová; Czech Republic	53.38	Kaliese Spencer; Jamaica	53.66
3000 metres steeplechase^{[g]}	Habiba Ghribi; Tunisia	9:08.37	Sofia Assefa; Ethiopia	9:09.84	Milcah Chemos Cheywa; Kenya	9:09.88
4 × 100 m relay	United States; Tianna Madison; Allyson Felix; Bianca Knight; Carmelita Jeter; Jeneba Tarmoh*; Lauryn Williams*	40.82 (WR)	Jamaica; Shelly-Ann Fraser-Pryce; Sherone Simpson; Veronica Campbell-Brown; Kerron Stewart; Samantha Henry-Robinson*; Schillonie Calvert*	41.41	Ukraine; Olesya Povh; Hrystyna Stuy; Mariya Ryemyen; Elyzaveta Bryzgina	42.04
4 × 400 m relay^{[h]}	United States; DeeDee Trotter; Allyson Felix; Francena McCorory; Sanya Richards-Ross; Keshia Baker*; Diamond Dixon*	3:16.87	Jamaica; Christine Day; Rosemarie Whyte; Shericka Williams; Novlene Williams-Mills; Shereefa Lloyd*	3:20.95	Ukraine; Alina Lohvynenko; Olha Zemlyak; Hanna Yaroshchuk; Nataliya Pyhyda	3:23.57
Marathon	Tiki Gelana; Ethiopia	2:23:07 (OR)	Priscah Jeptoo; Kenya	2:23:12	Tatyana Arkhipova; Russia	2:23:29
20 kilometres walk^{[i]}	Qieyang Shenjie; China	1:25:16 (OR)	Liu Hong; China	1:26:00	Lü Xiuzhi; China	1:27:10
High jump^{[j]}	Anna Chicherova; Russia	2.05	Brigetta Barrett; United States	2.03	Ruth Beitia; Spain	2.00
Pole vault	Jenn Suhr; United States	4.75	Yarisley Silva; Cuba	4.75	Yelena Isinbayeva; Russia	4.70
Long jump	Brittney Reese; United States	7.12	Yelena Sokolova; Russia	7.07	Janay DeLoach; United States	6.89
Triple jump	Olga Rypakova; Kazakhstan	14.98	Caterine Ibargüen; Colombia	14.80	Olha Saladukha; Ukraine	14.79
Shot put^{[k]}	Valerie Adams; New Zealand	20.70	Gong Lijiao; China	20.22	Li Ling; China	19.63
Discus throw^{[l]}	Sandra Perković; Croatia	69.11	Li Yanfeng; China	67.22	Yarelys Barrios; Cuba	66.38
Hammer throw^{[m]}	Anita Włodarczyk; Poland	77.60	Betty Heidler; Germany	77.13	Zhang Wenxiu; China	76.34
Javelin throw	Barbora Špotáková; Czech Republic	69.55	Christina Obergföll; Germany	65.16	Linda Stahl; Germany	64.91
Heptathlon^{[n]}	Jessica Ennis; Great Britain	6955	Lilli Schwarzkopf; Germany	6649	Austra Skujytė; Lithuania	6599

*Indicates the athlete only competed in the preliminary heats.

- ^{800 metres} On 10 February 2017, the Court of Arbitration for Sport upheld a four-year ban that effectively stripped of the gold medal of Mariya Savinova of Russia, based upon irregularities in her biological passport and doping. Caster Semenya of South Africa was advanced to gold, Ekaterina Poistogova of Russia to silver, and Pamela Jelimo of Kenya to bronze. In April 2024, Guliyev (formerly Poustogova) was banned by the Russian Athletics Federation for infractions in 2012 and 2013, voiding her results including the 2012 Olympic final. On 6 June 2025, the Court of Arbitration for Sport dismissed Guliyev's appeal and revoked her medal, almost certainly leading to the IOC upgrading Pamela Jelimo to the silver and Alysia Montano to the bronze.
- ^{1500 metres} On 17 August 2015, the Court of Arbitration for Sport says it approved a settlement agreed to by Turkish athlete Aslı Çakır Alptekin and the IAAF. Alptekin has agreed to forfeit her 1500 metres Olympic title and serve an eight-year ban for blood doping. On 29 March 2017, Turkish athlete Gamze Bulut was banned for doping and lost her Olympic silver medal. Maryam Yusuf Jamal of Bahrain was advanced to gold, the silver medal was awarded to Tatyana Tomashova of Russia, and the bronze medal was awarded to Abeba Aregawi of Ethiopia. Tomashova was earlier found guilty of doping and missed the 2008 Olympics because of that, and was banned after the Olympics for failing another drug test. In 2024, Tomashova's silver medal was stripped by CAS after re-testing of her samples. If the IOC reallocates the medal, Aregawi stands to be upgraded to silver and Shannon Rowbury to bronze.
- ^{400 metres hurdles} In October 2022, more than 10 years and 2 months after the race, Natalya Antyukh's results from July 2012 to June 2013 were disqualified for doping after a retest of her samples, stripping her of the gold medal in the 400 m hurdles at the 2012 Summer Olympics. Medals were reallocated.
- ^{3000 metres steeplechase} On 30 January 2015, the IOC confirmed that runner Yuliya Zaripova, Russia, will be stripped of her gold medal in the 3000 metres steeplechase after testing positive for anabolic steroids. On 4 June 2016, the gold medal was officially reallocated to second place Habiba Ghribi from Tunisia by the IOC and IAAF updated the results.
- ^{4 × 400 metres relay} On 1 February 2017, the International Olympic Committee stripped the silver medal of the Russian team due to doping of Antonina Krivoshapka Medals were reallocated.
- ^{20 kilometres walk} On 24 March 2016, the Court of Arbitration for Sport has issued decision that all competitive results obtained by Olga Kaniskina from 15 August 2009 to 15 October 2012 are disqualified for doping. Qieyang Shenjie of China was advanced to silver, and Liu Hong of China to bronze.
- ^{high jump} Bronze medalist Svetlana Shkolina of Russia was disqualified for doping in 2019. The bronze medal was then reallocated to Ruth Beitia of Spain in 2021.
- ^{shot put} The original winner, Nadzeya Ostapchuk of Belarus, was stripped of her gold medal shortly after the event after failing a doping test. The rest of the competitors were elevated by one position accordingly. On 20 August 2016, Yevgeniya Kolodko of Russia was also stripped of her silver medal after retested samples from the competition returned a positive doping result. Gong Lijiao of China was advanced to silver, and Li Ling of China to bronze.
- ^{discus throw} The original silver medalist, Darya Pishchalnikova of Russia, was stripped of her silver medal after failing drugs tests. The rest of the competitors were elevated by one position accordingly.
- ^{hammer throw} The original gold medalist, Tatyana Lysenko of Russia, was stripped of her gold medal after failing drugs tests. Medals were reallocated.
- ^{heptathlon} On 29 November 2016, the Court of Arbitration for Sport has issued decision that all competitive results of original bronze medalist Tatyana Chernova of Russia between 15 August 2011 and 22 July 2013 are annulled due to failed drug tests. The bronze medal was awarded to Austra Skujytė of Lithuania.

== Records ==
=== World and Olympic records ===
A total of four world records in athletics and eleven Olympic records were broken during the competition. This was fewer than were set at the Beijing Olympics (5 world, 17 Olympic records) but greater than the number set at the 2004 Games in Athens (2 world, 10 Olympic records).

China's Chen Ding was the first Olympic record breaker, improving the men's 20 km walk record. All three Olympic walk records were broken in London as Sergey Kirdyapkin bettered the Olympic 50 km walk time and Elena Lashmanova set a new world record in the women's 20 km walk. However, both records from Russian racewalkers were later rescinded due to doping.

Usain Bolt was the first track athlete to improve an Olympic record as he defended his 100 m title with a run of 9.63 s. He later joined the Jamaican 4 × 100 metres relay team (featuring Nesta Carter, Michael Frater and Yohan Blake) to set a world record time of 36.84 s. The women's 4 × 100 metres relay event also saw a world record: an American team of Tianna Madison, Allyson Felix, Bianca Knight and Carmelita Jeter ran 40.82 seconds to take half a second off a record which had stood for nearly 27 years. Further women's Olympic records were set by Ethiopia's Tiki Gelana in the marathon and Sally Pearson in the 100 metres hurdles.

David Rudisha improved his own 800 metres world record to 1:40.91 minutes, becoming the first man to break that record at the Olympics since Ralph Doubell did so at the 1968 Games. Renaud Lavillenie was the only man to break a field event record, as he cleared an Olympic best of 5.97 m to win the pole vault competition.

Event	Date	Name	Nationality	Result	Type
Men's 100 metres	5 August	Usain Bolt	Jamaica	9.63	OR
Men's 800 metres	9 August	David Rudisha	Kenya	1:40.91	WR OR
Men's 4 × 100 metres relay	11 August	Nesta Carter; Michael Frater; Yohan Blake; Usain Bolt	Jamaica	36.84	WR OR
Men's 20 kilometres walk	4 August	Chen Ding	China	1:18:46	OR
Men's 50 kilometres walk	11 August	Jared Tallent	Australia	3:36:53	OR
Men's 50 kilometres walk	11 August	~~Sergey Kirdyapkin~~	Russia	~~3:35:59~~	~~OR~~
Men's pole vault	10 August	Renaud Lavillenie	France	5.97 m	OR
Women's 100 metres hurdles	7 August	Sally Pearson	Australia	12.35	OR
Women's marathon	5 August	Tiki Gelana	Ethiopia	2:23:07	OR
Women's 20 kilometres walk	11 August	Qieyang Shenjie	China	1:25:16	OR
Women's 20 kilometres walk	11 August	~~Elena Lashmanova~~	Russia	~~1:25:02~~	~~WR OR~~
Women's 4 × 100 metres relay	10 August	Tianna Madison; Allyson Felix; Bianca Knight; Carmelita Jeter	United States	40.82	WR OR
Women's hammer throw	10 August	~~Tatyana Lysenko~~	Russia	~~78.18 m~~	~~OR~~

== Doping ==
Prior to the Olympic competition, several prominent athletes were ruled out of the competition due to failed tests. World indoor medallists Dimitrios Chondrokoukis, Debbie Dunn, and Mariem Alaoui Selsouli were withdrawn from their Olympic teams in July for doping, as was 2004 Olympic medallist Zoltán Kővágó. At the Olympic competition, Tameka Williams admitted to taking a banned stimulant and was removed from the games. Ivan Tsikhan did not compete in the hammer throw as a re-test of his sample from the 2004 Athens Olympics, where he won silver, was positive. Hassan Hirt, Amine Laâlou, Marina Marghieva, Diego Palomeque, and defending 50 km walk champion Alex Schwazer were also suspended before taking part in their events.

Syrian hurdler Ghfran Almouhamad became the first track-and-field athlete to be suspended following a positive in-competition doping sample. Nadzeya Astapchuk was stripped of the women's shot put title after her sample came back positive for the banned anabolic agent metenolone. Karin Melis Mey was withdrawn before the long jump final when an earlier failed doping test was confirmed.

The women's 1500 m final has been dubbed "one of the dirtiest races in athletics history", after five of the twelve runners were disqualified for doping offences, including the original first and second-placed finishers, and the fourth-placed finisher who subsequently moved up to second place following the previous two disqualifications.

Multiple medalists were found guilty of doping after the Olympics. Russia has the most (9) medals stripped.

== See also ==
- Athletics at the 2012 Summer Olympics – Qualification
