= 2013 London Marathon =

33rd annual marathon race in London

33rd London Marathon
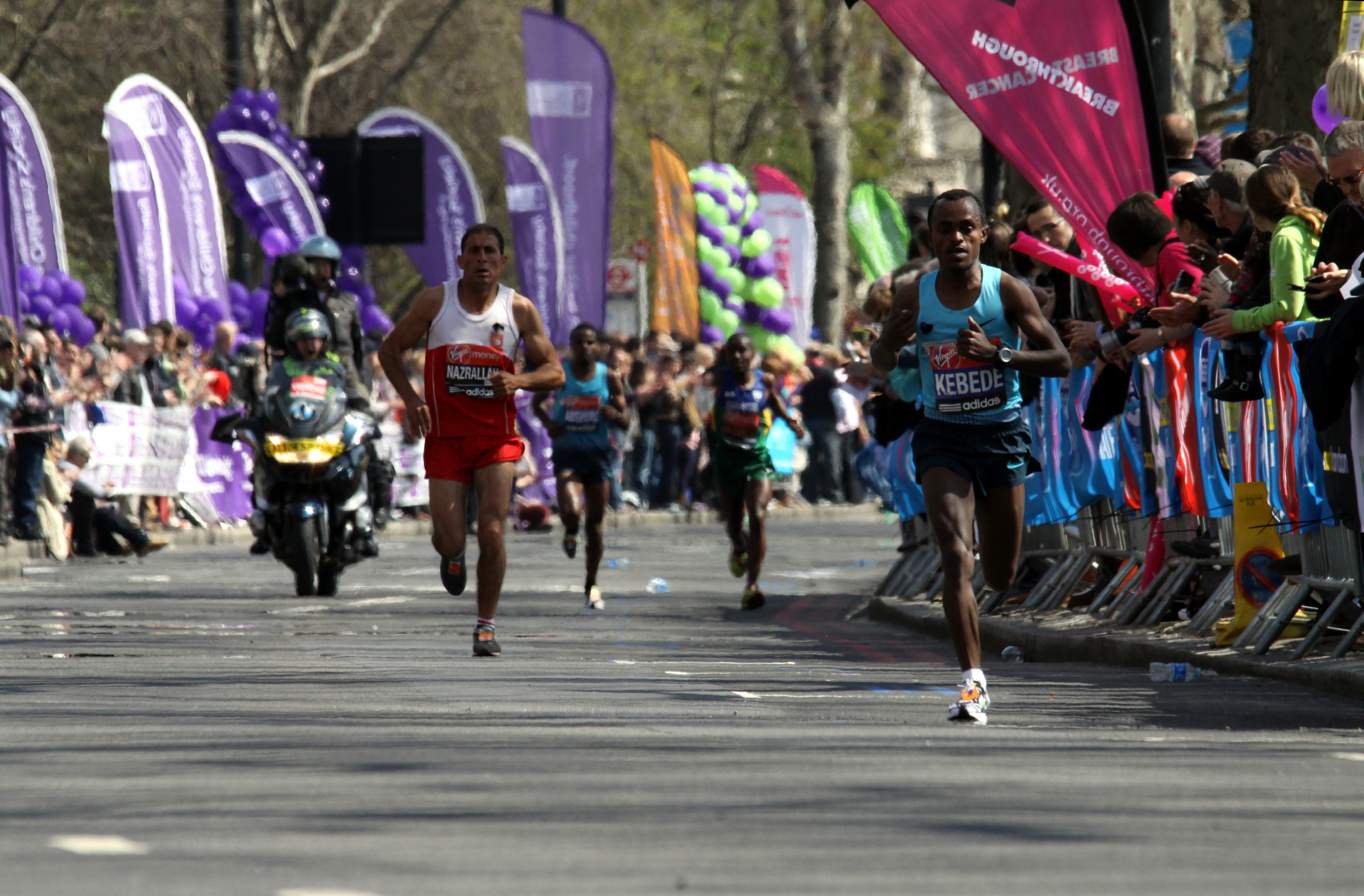
- Tsegaye Kebede, the men's winner during 2013 London Marathon
- Venue: London, England
- Date: 21 April 2013

Champions
- Men: Tsegaye Kebede (2:06:04)
- Women: Priscah Jeptoo (2:20:15)
- Wheelchair men: Kurt Fearnley (1:31:29)
- Wheelchair women: Tatyana McFadden (1:46:02)

The 2013 London Marathon was the 33rd running of the annual marathon race in London, England, which took place on Sunday, 21 April. The men's elite race was won by Ethiopia's Tsegaye Kebede and the women's race was won by Kenyan Priscah Jeptoo. Australian Kurt Fearnley won the men's wheelchair race, while American Tatyana McFadden won the women's wheelchair race with a new course record of 1:46:02.

Around 167,449 people applied to enter the race: 48,323 had their applications accepted and 34,631 started the race. A total of 34202 runners, 22,136 men and 12,066 women, finished the race.

In the under-17 Mini Marathon, the 3-mile able-bodied and wheelchair events were won by Alex George (14:34), Bobby Clay (16:24), Will Smith (12:41) and Jade Jones (12:39).

== Pre-race ==
After the Boston Marathon bombings six days before the London Marathon, organisers issued a statement announcing that the event's security—which is jointly planned with the Metropolitan Police—would be reviewed. On 16 April, Minister for Sport Hugh Robertson announced that the event would go ahead as planned, stating that he was "absolutely confident" that organisers can "keep the event safe and secure." Forty percent more police officers were deployed to manage the race than in 2012.

== Race description ==
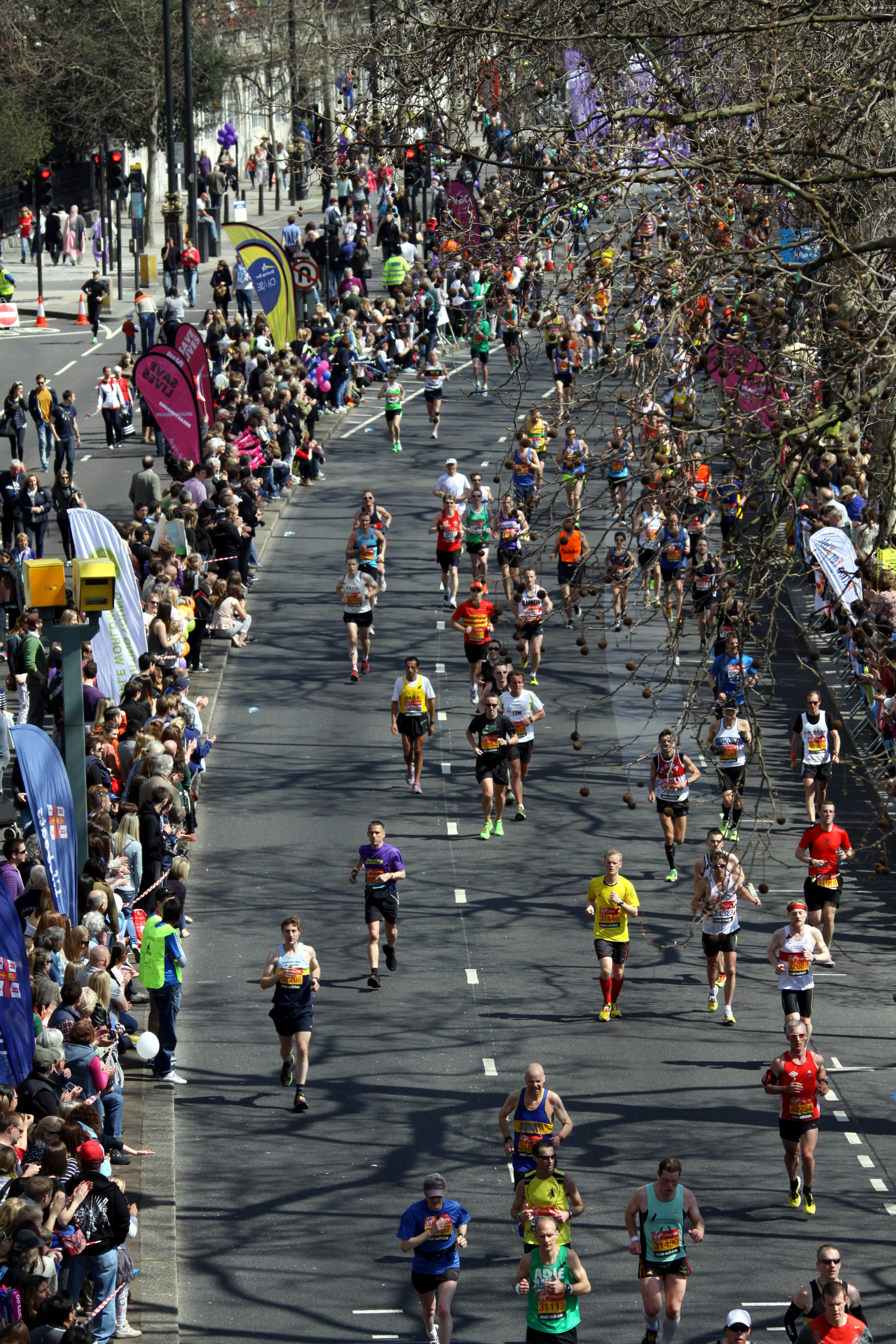
Participants in the race running along Victoria Embankment

The 2013 London Marathon began with a 30-second moment of silence in honour of the victims of the Boston Marathon bombings. Many runners also wore black ribbons on the encouragement of race organisers. Organisers also pledged to donate US$3 to a fund for Boston Marathon victims for every person who finished the race. The weather was ideal for racing, drawing 700,000 fans and raising the prospect of a world record time.

Through the halfway mark of the men's race, the leaders were on world record pace. At that point, Great Britain's Mo Farah withdrew from the race, as he had planned. The pace dropped off after that and Emmanuel Mutai of Kenya built a large lead. In the final kilometre of the race, Tsegaye Kebede of Ethiopia surged past Mutai to win the men's marathon with a time of two hours, six minutes and four seconds. Ayele Abshero of Ethiopia finished third. 2012 Olympic champion Stephen Kiprotich of Uganda took sixth.

At the 15-kilometre (9.3 mi) mark, the women's elite leaders converged with men's wheelchair racers at a water station. Ethiopia's Tiki Gelana, who won the marathon at the 2012 Olympics in London, and Canadian wheelchair racer Josh Cassidy collided as she attempted to cut in front of him to get water. She returned to the race, but fell off the pace in clear pain. Priscah Jeptoo of Kenya pulled away from the lead group of three when she ran a 5-minute, 11-second 21st mile. She won the women's race with a time of two hours, 20 minutes and 15 seconds. "Today I'm very, very happy, I couldn't believe I could be the winner," Jeptoo remarked. Edna Kiplagat of Kenya and Yukiko Akaba of Japan finished second and third respectively.

In the men's wheelchair race, Kurt Fearnley of Australia won an eight-way sprint to the finish to win with a time of 1:31:29. He credited a new training regimen for his win and remarked "I realised last year that at the last 300 m (980 ft) if someone's got that extra bit of power up their sleeve they beat you every time." Marcel Hug of Switzerland took second and Ernst van Dyk from South Africa finished third. Pre-race favourite and six-time winner David Weir of Great Britain finished fifth. Cassidy, who dropped out of the race after the crash, had harsh words for the race organisers. "I don't know who's responsible, but every year we come to overtake the women, there's 10 chairs going at 20 mph (32 km/h) and the poor women are scrambling to find their feet," he said. "I have a brand new $2,000 pair of wheels that are damaged, who's going to pay for them? Things have to change."

American Tatyana McFadden won the women's wheelchair race with a new course record of 1:46:02. Fellow American Amanda McGrory finished second and Sandra Graf of Switzerland took third.

== Results ==
=== Men ===
Position	Athlete	Nationality	Time
1st place, gold medalist(s)	Tsegaye Kebede	Ethiopia	2:06:04
2nd place, silver medalist(s)	Emmanuel Kipchirchir Mutai	Kenya	2:06:33
3rd place, bronze medalist(s)	Ayele Abshero	Ethiopia	2:06:57
4	Feyisa Lilesa	Ethiopia	2:07:46
5	Wilson Kipsang Kiprotich	Kenya	2:07:47
6	Stephen Kiprotich	Uganda	2:08:05
7	Yared Asmerom	Eritrea	2:08:22
8	Stanley Biwott	Kenya	2:08:39
9	Ayad Lamdassem	Spain	2:09:28
10	Patrick Makau Musyoki	Kenya	2:14:10
11	Patrick Rizzo	United States	2:16:05
12	Derek Hawkins	United Kingdom	2:16:50
13	Paul Pollock	Ireland	2:17:10
14	John Gilbert	United Kingdom	2:17:43
15	Anuradha Cooray	Sri Lanka	2:17:53
16	Philip Wicks	United Kingdom	2:19:07
17	James Kelly	United Kingdom	2:21:39
—	Hafid Chani	Morocco	DQ
—	Adil Annani	Morocco	DQ
—	Geoffrey Mutai	Kenya	DNF
—	Edwin Kipyego	Kenya	DNF
—	Philip Langat	Kenya	DNF
—	Mike Kipruto Kigen	Kenya	DNF
—	Deressa Chimsa	Ethiopia	DNF
—	Scott Overall	United Kingdom	DNF
—	Yared Hagos	Eritrea	DNF
—	Mo Farah	United Kingdom	DNF
—	Wilfred Kirwa Kigen	Kenya	DNF
—	Dennis Kipruto Kimetto	Kenya	DNF

=== Women ===
Position	Athlete	Nationality	Time
1st place, gold medalist(s)	Priscah Jeptoo	Kenya	2:20:15
2nd place, silver medalist(s)	Edna Kiplagat	Kenya	2:21:32
3rd place, bronze medalist(s)	Yukiko Akaba	Japan	2:24:43
4	Atsede Baysa	Ethiopia	2:25:14
5	Meselech Melkamu	Ethiopia	2:25:46
6	Florence Kiplagat	Kenya	2:27:05
7	Mai Ito	Japan	2:28:37
8	Alevtina Biktimirova	Russia	2:30:02
9	Susan Partridge	United Kingdom	2:30:46
10	Irvette van Zyl	South Africa	2:31:26
11	Adriana Aparecida da Silva	Brazil	2:31:44
12	Remi Sano	Japan	2:33:24
13	Amy Whitehead	United Kingdom	2:34:14
14	Chika Horie	Japan	2:35:30
15	Joyce Chepkirui	Kenya	2:35:54
16	Tiki Gelana	Ethiopia	2:36:55
17	Yoko Shibui	Japan	2:37:35
—	Josephine Chepkoech	Kenya	DNF
—	Valentine Kipketer	Kenya	DNF
—	Jéssica Augusto	Portugal	DNF
—	Helah Kiprop	Kenya	DNF
—	Volha Dubouskaya	Belarus	DNF

=== Wheelchair men ===
Position	Athlete	Nationality	Time
1st place, gold medalist(s)	Kurt Fearnley	Australia	1:31:29
2nd place, silver medalist(s)	Marcel Hug	Switzerland	1:31:29
3rd place, bronze medalist(s)	Ernst van Dyk	South Africa	1:31:30
4	Tomasz Hamerlak	Poland	1:31:30
5	David Weir	United Kingdom	1:31:31
6	Kota Hokinoue	Japan	1:31:31
7	Heinz Frei	Switzerland	1:31:32
8	Hiroyuki Yamamoto	Japan	1:31:33
9	Richard Colman	Australia	1:35:44
10	Denis Lemeunier	France	1:36:34

=== Wheelchair women ===
Position	Athlete	Nationality	Time
1st place, gold medalist(s)	Tatyana McFadden	United States	1:46:02 CR
2nd place, silver medalist(s)	Amanda McGrory	United States	1:46:04
3rd place, bronze medalist(s)	Sandra Graf	Switzerland	1:48:01
4	Christie Dawes	Australia	1:50:43
5	Shelly Woods	United Kingdom	1:50:44
6	Shirley Reilly	United States	1:50:46
7	Susannah Scaroni	United States	1:50:47
8	Madison de Rozario	Australia	1:53:44
9	Diane Roy	Canada	2:03:59
10	Meggan Dawson-Farrell	United Kingdom	2:18:23
