= 2010 African Championships in Athletics – Women's 1500 metres =

The women's 1500 metres at the 2010 African Championships in Athletics were held on July 29–30.

== Medalists ==
Gold	Silver	Bronze
Nancy Jebet Lagat; Kenya	Gelete Burka; Ethiopia	Btissam Lakhouad; Morocco

== Results ==
=== Heats ===
Qualification: First 4 of each heat (Q) and the next 4 fastest (q) qualified for the final.

Rank	Heat	Name	Nationality	Time	Notes
1	1	Irene Jelagat	Kenya	4:13.97	Q
2	2	Nancy Jebet Lagat	Kenya	4:15.99	Q
3	1	Bertukan Feyisa	Ethiopia	4:16.20	Q
4	2	Mouna Tabsart	Morocco	4:16.35	Q
5	2	Gelete Burka	Ethiopia	4:16.74	Q
6	2	Meskerem Assefa	Ethiopia	4:16.89	Q
7	2	Ann Karindi	Kenya	4:17.21	q
8	1	Siham Hilali	Morocco	4:17.79	Q
9	1	Btissam Lakhouad	Morocco	4:17.87	Q
10	1	Rene Kalmer	South Africa	4:18.32	q
11	1	Janet Achola	Uganda	4:20.41	q
12	1	Eliane Saholinirina	Madagascar	4:22.86	q
13	2	Juliet Chekwel	Uganda	4:25.50	
14	2	Divine Ahishikiye	Burundi	4:36.59	SB
15	1	Zeitun Jumanne	Tanzania	4:44.89	
16	1	Samia Nor Omar	Somalia	5:36.97	
	2	Sani Ruth Awute	Nigeria	DNF	

=== Final ===
Rank	Name	Nationality	Time	Notes
1st place, gold medalist(s)	Nancy Jebet Lagat	Kenya	4:10.43	
2nd place, silver medalist(s)	Gelete Burka	Ethiopia	4:11.12	
3rd place, bronze medalist(s)	Btissam Lakhouad	Morocco	4:11.81	
4	Irene Jelagat	Kenya	4:12.15	SB
5	Meskerem Assefa	Ethiopia	4:14.37	
6	Ann Karindi	Kenya	4:14.81	
7	Bertukan Feyisa	Ethiopia	4:16.29	
8	Rene Kalmer	South Africa	4:18.21	
9	Janet Achola	Uganda	4:19.22	
10	Mouna Tabsart	Morocco	4:19.83	
11	Siham Hilali	Morocco	4:20.98	
12	Eliane Saholinirina	Madagascar	4:25.60	
