= Ann Karindi Mwangi =

Kenyan runner (born 1988)

Medal record

Women's athletics

Representing Kenya

IAAF World Cross Country Championships
Gold medal – first place	2009 Amman	Senior team

Ann Karindi Mwangi (born 8 December 1988) is a Kenyan middle- and long-distance runner. She was a team gold medallist at the IAAF World Cross Country Championships in 2009 and represented her country at the 2011 All-Africa Games.

From Nyahururu in Kenya's Laikipia County, She moved to Japan and ran for the Toyota Industries corporate team. She set a stage record at the 2010 All-Japan Women's Corporate Ekiden Championships.

Running for Kenya, she won her first major medal at the 2009 IAAF World Cross Country Championships. In seventh place, she took the women's team title with the help of Florence Kiplagat, Linet Masai and Lineth Chepkurui. She won the Cross Zornotza the following year and had her first top level road win in Japan at the Sanyo Women's 10K.

She began to focus more on middle-distance after 2009. She was sixth in the 1500 metres at both the 2010 African Championships in Athletics and the 2011 All-Africa Games. She helped set a world record in the 4 × 1500 metres relay event. Running in a team with Mercy Cherono, Irene Jelagat, and Perin Nenkampi, the women took two seconds off the previous best at 17:05.72 minutes.

== Personal bests ==
- 800 metres – 2:04.69 min (2015)
- 1500 metres – 4:05.23 min (2014)
- 3000 metres – 8:43.54 min (2009)
- 5000 metres – 15:15.19 min (2010)
- 10K run – 32:47 min (2011)

All information from All-Athletics profile

== International competitions ==
Year	Competition	Venue	Position	Event	Notes
2009	World Cross Country Championships	Amman, Jordan	7th	Senior race	26:49
2009	World Cross Country Championships	Amman, Jordan	1st	Senior team	14 pts
2010	African Championships	Nairobi, Kenya	6th	1500 m	4:14.81
2011	All-Africa Games	Maputo, Mozambique	6th	1500 m	4:18.76
