= Athletics at the 2011 All-Africa Games – Women's 1500 metres =

The women's 1500 metres event at the 2011 All-Africa Games was held on 15 September.

== Results ==
Rank	Name	Nationality	Time	Notes
1st place, gold medalist(s)	Irene Jelagat	Kenya	4:13.67	
2nd place, silver medalist(s)	Joyce Chepkirui	Kenya	4:13.71	
3rd place, bronze medalist(s)	Tezita Bogale	Ethiopia	4:14.41	
4	Meskerem Assefa	Ethiopia	4:14.76	
5	Bertukan Feyisa	Ethiopia	4:17.01	
6	Ann Karindi	Kenya	4:18.76	
7	Annet Negesa	Uganda	4:24.32	
8	Ehsan Gibril	Sudan	4:25.44	
9	Tandiwe Nyathi	Zimbabwe	4:35.02	
10	Annabelle Lascar	Mauritius	4:35.76	
11	Samerawit Mengstab	Eritrea	4:38.21	
12	Faithful Goremusandu	Zimbabwe	4:40.91	
13	Liteboho Makhatseane	Lesotho	4:42.29	
14	Naira Zunguene	Mozambique	4:45.80	
15	Mokulubete Makalise	Lesotho	4:53.21	
