= Vanessa Veiga =

Spanish long-distance runner

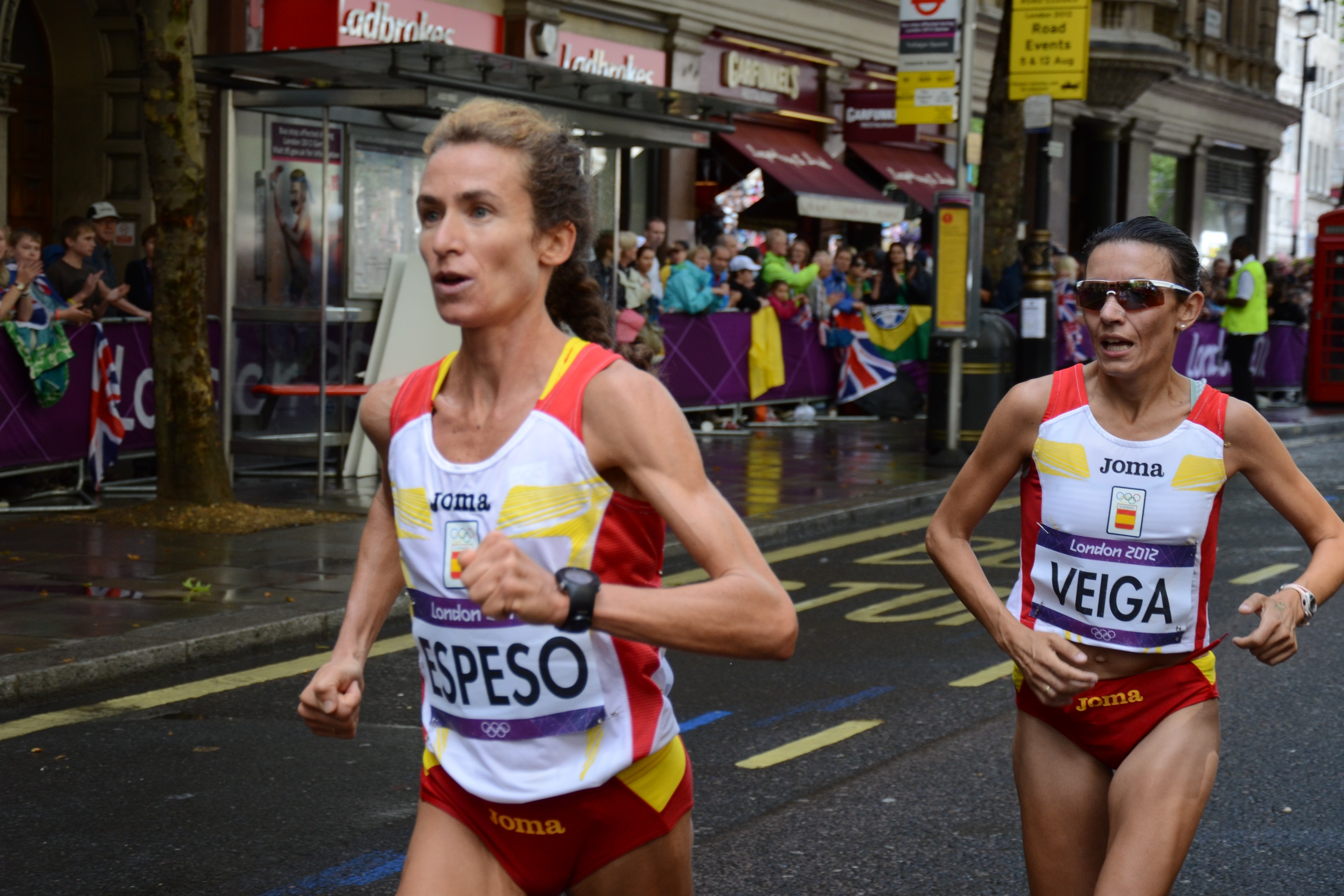
- María Elena Espeso and Vanessa Veiga (right) in the 2012 Summer Olympics marathon

Personal information
- Born: July 20, 1979 (age 47)
- Height: 1.59 m (5 ft 2 1/2 in)
- Weight: 43 kg (95 lb)

Sport
- Country: Spain
- Sport: Athletics
- Event: Marathon

Vanessa Veiga (born 20 July 1979 in Gondomar, Pontevedra) is a Spanish long-distance runner. She competed in the marathon at the 2012 Summer Olympics, placing 97th with a time of 2:46:53.

She won the 2013 Madrid Marathon.

She is married to fellow Spanish runner Julio Rey.

== Career ==
Her international debut came at the 1998 IAAF World Cross Country Championships, where she finished 35th in the junior section. She started her career in long-distance track events, but after marrying Julio Rey – the Spanish record holder in the marathon – she spent most of her time supporting her husband. She competed at the 2001 European Athletics U23 Championships, placing seventh in the 10,000 metres. After 2003 she stopped running in professional races and focused on her family and had three children with her husband.

Veiga returned to action in 2010, running in cross country races and at the Spanish Athletics Championships, where she came third in the 10,000 m. The following year she achieved a best of 33:34.56 minutes in that event at the European Cup 10000m, placing nineteenth. She won the Spanish titles in both the half marathon and marathon events in 2011 and her winning time of 2:32:57 hours in the latter event brought her qualification for the 2012 London Olympics.

At the Granollers Half Marathon at the start of 2012 she ran a personal best of 72:45 minutes She ran again at the European Cup 10000m but managed only 30th place on that occasion. She was one of three Spanish women to run in the 2012 Olympic Marathon (alongside Alessandra Aguilar and María Elena Espeso) but she was their slowest performer, finishing the distance in 2:46:53 hours – fourteen minutes off her best and in 97th place.

She won the 2013 Madrid Marathon in April and Madrid Half Marathon in 2015.

== Personal bests ==
- 3000 metres – 9:25.54 min (1998, indoor)
- 5000 metres – 16:15.03 min (2001)
- 10,000 metres – 33:34.56 min (2011)
- Half marathon – 1:12:45 (2012)
- Marathon – 2:32:57 (2012)
