= Dubovskoy =

Dubovskoy (Russian: Дубовской) is a Slavic masculine surname, its feminine counterpart is Dubovskaya. It may refer to

- Nikolay Dubovskoy (1859–1918), Russian landscape painter
- Volha Dubouskaya (born 1983), Belarusian long-distance runner
