= Priscah Jeptoo =

Kenyan long-distance runner (born 1984)

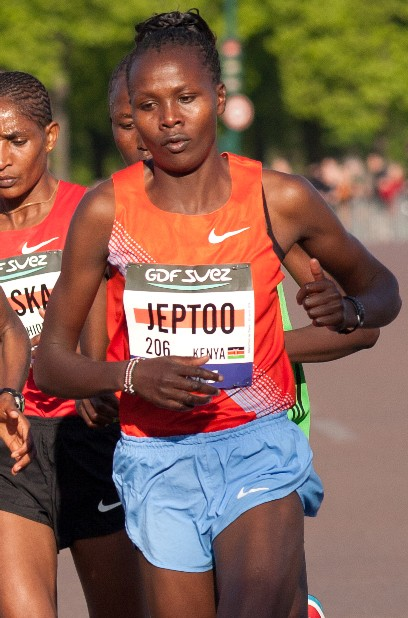
- Priscah Jeptoo at the 2011 Paris Marathon

Personal information
- Nationality: Kenyan
- Born: 26 June 1984 (age 42) Nandi, Kenya
- Height: 5 ft 5 in (165 cm)
- Weight: 108 lb (49 kg)

Sport
- Country: Kenya
- Sport: Athletics
- Event: Long distance running

Achievements and titles
- Personal bests: Half marathon: 1:06:11; Marathon: 2:20:14
Medal record
World Championships
Silver medal – second place	2011 Daegu	Marathon
Olympic Games
Silver medal – second place	2012 London	Marathon

Priscah Jeptoo (born 26 June 1984) is a Kenyan professional long-distance runner who specialises in the marathon. She has won marathons in New York, Paris, Turin, and London and has a best time of 2:20:14 for the distance. She was the runner-up in the marathon at both the World Championships in Athletics in 2011 and the 2012 London Olympics. She ranks third all-time over the half marathon distance with her best of 66 minutes and 11 seconds (and 65:45 minutes on the Great North Run downhill course).

== Career ==
Jeptoo began competing at top level competitions in 2008 and made the top ten women at the Saint Silvester Road Race that year. In 2009 she began with two wins in Portugal, at the Douro-Tal Half Marathon and then the Corrida Festas Cidade do Porto 15K race. These preceded a course record-breaking run at the Porto Marathon in November, as she recorded a time of 2:30:40 hours for her debut effort. At the start of the following year she took second place at the Padua Marathon. Jeptoo showed marked improvement at the Turin Marathon in November, at which she outran Fate Tola to win the race in a new best time of 2:27:02 hours.

She returned to Kenya in 2011 and came second at the Discovery Kenya Cross Country behind Priscah Jepleting. She won the Goyang Joongang Half Marathon in March, setting a new personal best of 1:10:26 hours for the distance. Jeptoo had a significant breakthrough at the 2011 Paris Marathon: although she did not expect to win, she successfully held off challenges from Agnes Kiprop and Koren Yal to be the first woman across the line, recording a time of 2:22:55 hours. This knocked off more than four minutes from her previous best and was the second fastest run ever recorded on the course.

She won the silver medal in the 2011 World Championships in Athletics in Daegu, finishing in 2:29:00 and placing second behind countrywoman Edna Kiplagat. Jeptoo was part of a Kenyan sweep of the medals, with Sharon Cherop taking the bronze, making it the first time that a country had taken all the medals in the World Championships marathon. She turned to cross country in November 2011 and came third at the Cross de Atapuerca race then won the Cross de Soria. She ran a new course record at the New Year's Eve Saint Silvester Road Race, beating Wude Ayalew to win the event.

At the start of 2012 she finished second to Joyce Chepkirui at the Discovery Kenya Cross Country. She ran a personal best of 2:20:14 at the 2012 London Marathon, taking third place. This performance gained her a place on the Kenyan Olympic team and she went on to take the silver medal in the Olympic marathon. Her time of 2:23:12 was faster than the previous Olympic record, but five seconds behind the winner Tiki Gelana. After the Olympics she won the Portugal Half Marathon and the end-of-year São Silvestre De Luanda races.

She moved up to third on the half marathon all-time lists with a time of 66:11 minutes at the RAK Half Marathon in February 2013, although the exceptionally fast race saw her finish second behind Lucy Kabuu. She won the 2013 London Marathon in a time of 2:20:15, beating the Olympic champion Tiki Gelana, who fell mid-race. In July she won the Bogotá Half Marathon by a margin of over two minutes. In November 2013, she won the New York City Marathon with a time of 2:25:07.

After dropping out of the 2014 London Marathon with a leg injury, Priscah Jeptoo marked her return from injury with a very fast time at the Seven Hills Run 15 km road-race in Nijmegen, The Netherlands. Her time 46:59 makes her the 4th fastest all-time.

== Personal life ==
Jeptoo met Abel Kirui at a training camp and he invited her to visit the Seventh-day Adventist Church that he was a member of. Jeptoo regularly visited the church and got baptized into the Seventh-day Adventist Church and she also married a fellow member. Jeptoo along with fellow Seventh-day Adventists Abel Kirui and Amos Tirop Matui founded Better Living Marathon.

== Achievements ==
=== World Marathon Majors results ===
World Marathon Majors	2012	2013	2014	2015	2016
Tokyo Marathon	-	-	-	-	-
Boston Marathon	-	-	-	-	-
London Marathon	3rd	1st	DNF	7th	8th
Berlin Marathon	-	-	-	-	-
Chicago Marathon	-	-	-	-	-
New York City Marathon	-	1st	-	6th	-
