= Btissam Lakhouad =

Moroccan middle-distance runner

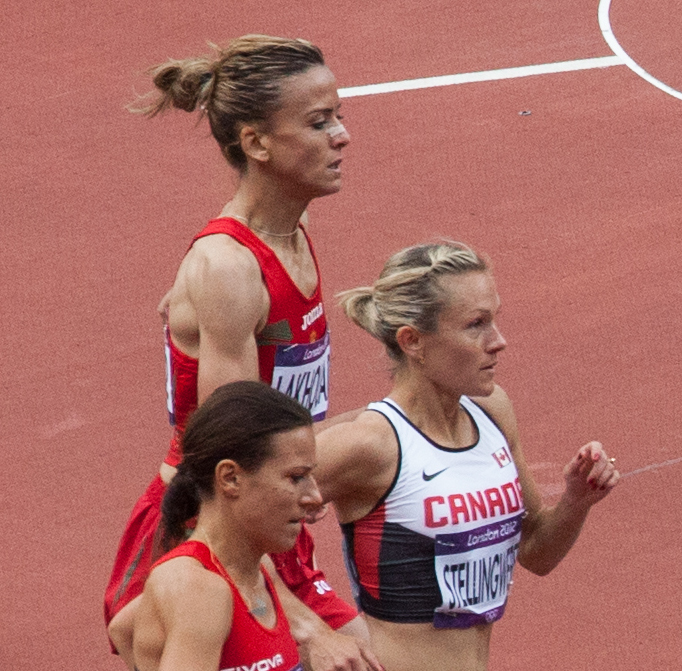
- Lakhouad (top) at the 2012 Summer Olympics

Medal record

Women's athletics

Representing Morocco

African Championships
Bronze medal – third place	2010 Nairobi	1500 m

Btissam Lakhouad (born 7 December 1980) is a Moroccan middle-distance runner who specializes in the 1500 metres. She represented her country at the Summer Olympics in 2008 and 2012. She was fourth at the World Championships in Athletics in 2011 and has won medals at the Mediterranean Games and the African Championships in Athletics.

A Khouribga native, she competed in the 1500 m at both the 2007 and 2008 World Athletics Finals, finishing in sixth and eleventh place, respectively. She represented Morocco at the 2008 Summer Olympics and, after finishing third in her heat, she qualified for the final of the competition. She finished in last place however, two places behind teammate Siham Hilali. She improved her 1500 m best to 4:03.23 minutes at the 2009 Herculis meet in Monaco and went to be a semi-finalist in the event at the 2009 World Championships in Athletics. In regional competition, she claimed the silver medal at the 2009 Mediterranean Games and won a gold medal at the 2009 Jeux de la Francophonie, heading a Moroccan medal sweep.

Lakhouad ran her first sub-4 minute 1500 m race in 2010, recording 3:59.35 minutes for second at the Athletissima Diamond League meet in July to break the Moroccan national record. She won her first continental medal soon after, taking the 1500 m bronze medal at the 2010 African Championships in Athletics. She also placed fourth in the 800 metres final. She also competed in the 2010 IAAF World Cross Country Championships, finishing 34th overall. She delivered her career best global level performance at the 2011 World Championships in Athletics by taking fourth place in the 1500 m final.

She ran at the 80th edition of the Cinque Mulini cross country and came third.

== Achievements ==
Year	Competition	Venue	Position	Event	Notes
Representing Morocco
2008	Olympic Games	Beijing, China	12th	1500 m	4:07.25
2009	Mediterranean Games	Pescara, Italy	2nd	1500 m	4:12.07
2009	World Championships	Berlin, Germany	11th (sf)	1500 m	4:08.72
2009	Jeux de la Francophonie	Beirut, Lebanon	1st	1500 m	4:21.39
2010	African Championships	Nairobi, Kenya	4th	800 m	2:01.75
2010	African Championships	Nairobi, Kenya	3rd	1500 m	4:11.81
2011	World Championships	Daegu, South Korea	4th	1500 m	4:06.18
2012	Olympic Games	London, United Kingdom	DNF	1500 m	DNF
2013	World Championships	Moscow, Russia	23rd (h)	1500 m	4:09.15

== Personal bests ==
Event	Time	Venue	Date
800 metres	2:00.22	Rabat, Morocco	27 May 2012
1500 metres	3:59.35	Lausanne, Switzerland	8 July 2010
1500 metres (indoor)	4:07.86	Stockholm, Sweden	23 February 2012
One mile	4:25.35	Brussels, Belgium	14 September 2007
3000 metres (indoor)	9:08.02	Stuttgart, Germany	3 February 2007

- All information taken from IAAF profile.
