= Kenya at the 2012 Summer Olympics =

- IOC code: KEN
- NOC: National Olympic Committee of Kenya
- Website: teamkenya.or.ke

in London
- Competitors: 47 in 4 sports
- Flag bearers: Jason Dunford (opening); David Rudisha (closing)
- Medals Ranked 28th: Gold 2 Silver 5 Bronze 6 Total 13

Summer Olympics appearances (overview)
- 1956; 1960; 1964; 1968; 1972; 1976–1980; 1984; 1988; 1992; 1996; 2000; 2004; 2008; 2012; 2016; 2020; 2024; 2028

Kenya competed at the 2012 Summer Olympics in London, from 27 July to 12 August 2012. This was the nation's and thirteenth appearance at the Olympics, they did not participate in the 1976 Summer Olympics in Montreal and the 1980 Summer Olympics in Moscow because of the African and United States boycott.

National Olympic Committee Kenya (NOCK) sent a total of 47 athletes, 27 men and 20 women, competed in athletics (specifically in the middle-distance events and marathon), boxing, swimming and weightlifting. The Kenyan team featured four past Olympic champions: middle-distance runners Pamela Jelimo and Asbel Kiprop and steeplechase runners Brimin Kipruto and Ezekiel Kemboi. Among these champions, only Kemboi managed to recapture his gold medal from Athens, after winning the men's steeplechase event. Kenya's top swimmer Jason Dunford, who specialized in the butterfly and freestyle events, became the nation's first male flag bearer at the opening ceremony since 2000.

Kenya left London with a total of 11 medals (2 gold, 4 silver, and 5 bronze), being the most successful African country in these Olympic games based on the overall medal standings. Two more medals were redistributed to Kenyan athletes after the games ended due to doping cases. All of these medals were awarded to the track and field athletes. Middle-distance runner and world champion David Rudisha became the first athlete to set a world record on the track in London, as he won the gold medal in the men's 800 m.

== Medalists ==
Medal	Name	Sport	Event	Date
Gold	Ezekiel Kemboi	Athletics	Men's 3000 m steeplechase	5 August
Gold	David Rudisha	Athletics	Men's 800 m	9 August
Silver	Sally Kipyego	Athletics	Women's 10,000 m	3 August
Silver	Priscah Jeptoo	Athletics	Women's marathon	5 August
Silver	Vivian Cheruiyot	Athletics	Women's 5000 m	10 August
Silver	Pamela Jelimo	Athletics	Women's 800 metres	11 August
Silver	Abel Kirui	Athletics	Men's marathon	12 August
Bronze	Vivian Cheruiyot	Athletics	Women's 10,000 m	3 August
Bronze	Abel Kiprop Mutai	Athletics	Men's 3000 m steeplechase	5 August
Bronze	Milcah Chemos Cheywa	Athletics	Women's 3000 m steeplechase	6 August
Bronze	Timothy Kitum	Athletics	Men's 800 m	9 August
Bronze	Thomas Longosiwa	Athletics	Men's 5000 metres	11 August
Bronze	Wilson Kipsang	Athletics	Men's marathon	12 August

== Athletics ==
Kenyan athletes have so far achieved qualifying standards in the following athletics events (up to a maximum of 3 athletes in each event at the 'A' Standard, and 1 at the 'B' Standard):

Key

- Note–Ranks given for track events are within the athlete's heat only
- Q = Qualified for the next round
- q = Qualified for the next round as a fastest loser or, in field events, by position without achieving the qualifying target
- NR = National record
- N/A = Round not applicable for the event
- Bye = Athlete not required to compete in round

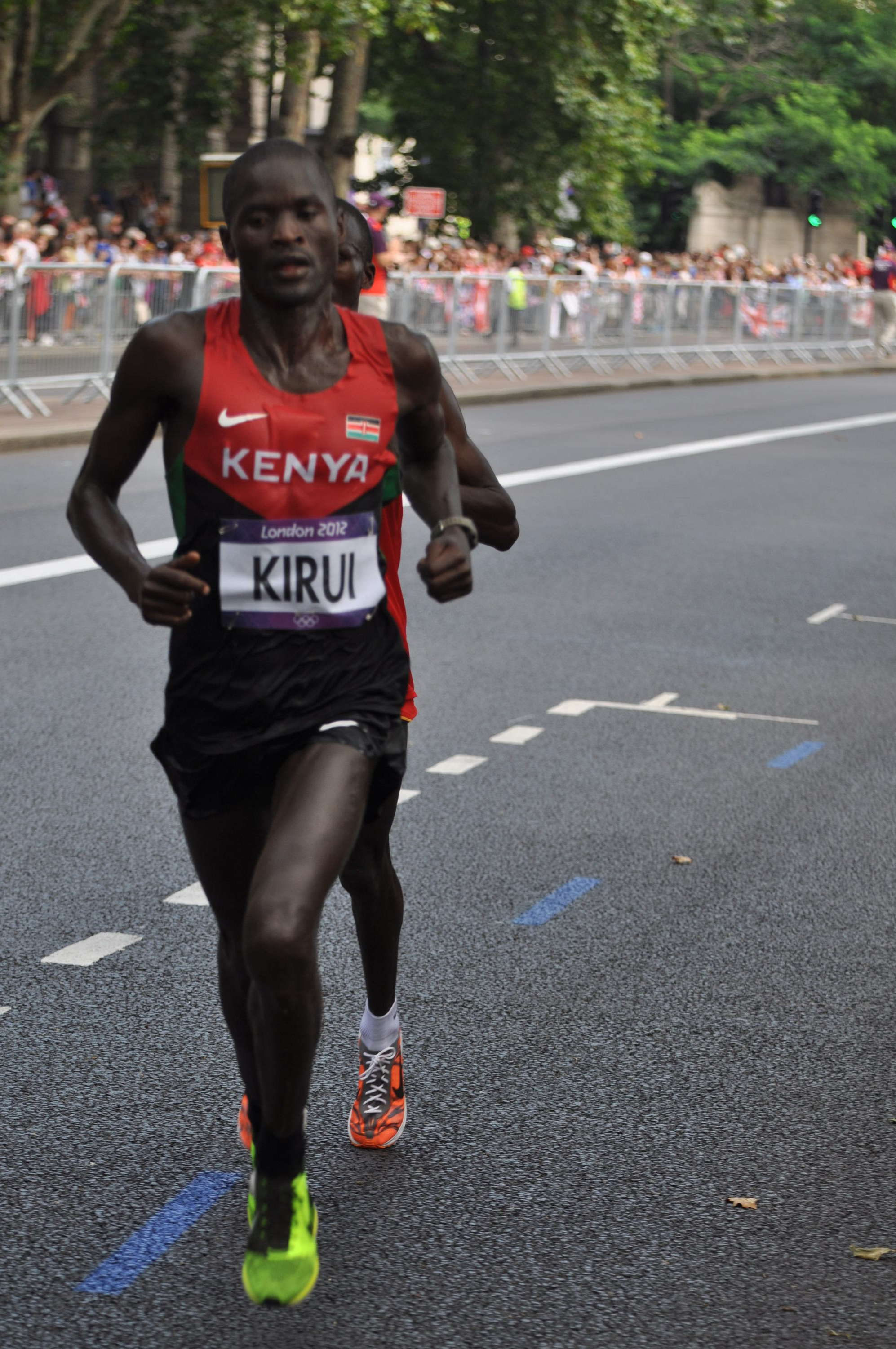
Abel Kirui won the silver medal in men's marathon.

Men
Track & road events

Athlete	Event	Heat		Semifinal		Final	
Athlete	Event	Result	Rank	Result	Rank	Result	Rank
Anthony Chemut	800 m	1:47.42	2 Q	1:45.63	4	Did not advance	
Timothy Kitum	800 m	1:45.72	2 Q	1:44.63	2 Q	1:42.53	3rd place, bronze medalist(s)
David Rudisha	800 m	1:45.90	1 Q	1:44.35	1 Q	1:40.91 WR	1st place, gold medalist(s)
Nixon Chepseba	1500 m	3:42.29	9 Q	3:34.89	4 Q	3:39.04	11
Silas Kiplagat	1500 m	3:39.79	4 Q	3:34.60	2 Q	3:36.19	7
Asbel Kiprop	1500 m	3:36.59	3 Q	3:42.92	2 Q	3:39.04	12
Isiah Koech	5000 m	13:25.64	2 Q	—N/a		13:43.83	5
Thomas Longosiwa	5000 m	13:15.41	3 Q	—N/a		13:42.36	3rd place, bronze medalist(s)
Edwin Soi	5000 m	13:27.06	6	—N/a		Did not advance	
Bedan Karoki	10000 m	—N/a				27:32.94	5
Wilson Kiprop	10000 m	—N/a				DNF	
Moses Masai	10000 m	—N/a				27:41.34	12
Vincent Kosgei	400 m hurdles	50.80	7	Did not advance			
Boniface Mucheru	400 m hurdles	50.33	6	Did not advance			
Ezekiel Kemboi	3000 m steeplechase	8:20.97	2 Q	—N/a		8:18.56	1st place, gold medalist(s)
Brimin Kipruto	3000 m steeplechase	8:28.62	1 Q	—N/a		8:23.03	5
Abel Mutai	3000 m steeplechase	8:17.70	3 Q	—N/a		8:19.73	3rd place, bronze medalist(s)
Wilson Kipsang	Marathon	—N/a				2:09:37	3rd place, bronze medalist(s)
Abel Kirui	Marathon	—N/a				2:08:27	2nd place, silver medalist(s)
Emmanuel Mutai	Marathon	—N/a				2:14:49	17
Alphas Kishoyian; Boniface Mucheru; Vincent Mumo; Boniface Mweresa	4 × 400 m relay	DSQ		—N/a		Did not advance	

Field events

Athlete	Event	Qualification		Final	
Athlete	Event	Distance	Position	Distance	Position
Julius Yego	Javelin throw	81.81	9 q	77.15	12

Women
Track & road events

Athlete	Event	Heat		Semifinal		Final	
Athlete	Event	Result	Rank	Result	Rank	Result	Rank
Joy Nakhumicha Sakari	400 m	51.85	3 Q	52.95	8	Did not advance	
Pamela Jelimo	800 m	2:00.54	1 Q	1:59.42	1 Q	1:57.59	2nd place, silver medalist(s)
Janeth Jepkosgei	800 m	2:01.04	1 Q	1:58.26	3 q	2:00.19	8
Cherono Koech	800 m	2:08.43	3 Q	2:00.53	5	Did not advance	
Faith Chepngetich	1500 m	4:08.78	9	Did not advance			
Hellen Obiri	1500 m	4:05.40	4 Q	4:02.30	5 Q	4:16.57	12
Eunice Sum	1500 m	4:16.95	10	Did not advance			
Vivian Cheruiyot	5000 m	15:01.54	2 Q	—N/a		15:04.73	2nd place, silver medalist(s)
Viola Kibiwot	5000 m	14:59.31	3 Q	—N/a		15:11.59	6
Sally Kipyego	5000 m	15:01.87	3 Q	—N/a		15:05.79	4
Joyce Chepkurui	10000 m	—N/a				DNF	
Vivian Cheruiyot	10000 m	—N/a				30:30.44	3rd place, bronze medalist(s)
Sally Kipyego	10000 m	—N/a				30:26.37	2nd place, silver medalist(s)
Maureen Maiyo	400 m hurdles	1:02.16	7	Did not advance			
Milcah Chemos	3000 m steeplechase	9:27.09	3 Q	—N/a		9:09.88	4
Mercy Njoroge	3000 m steeplechase	9:25.99	3 Q	—N/a		9:26.73	10
Lydia Rotich	3000 m steeplechase	9:42.03	8	—N/a		Did not advance	
Priscah Jeptoo	Marathon	—N/a				2:23:12	2nd place, silver medalist(s)
Mary Keitany	Marathon	—N/a				2:23.56	4
Edna Kiplagat	Marathon	—N/a				2:27:52	20

== Boxing ==
Kenya has qualified boxers for the following events

Men

Athlete	Event	Round of 32	Round of 16	Quarterfinals	Semifinals	Final	
Athlete	Event	Opposition Result	Opposition Result	Opposition Result	Opposition Result	Opposition Result	Rank
Benson Gicharu Njangiru	Flyweight	Abdelaal (EGY); L 16–19	Did not advance				

Women

Athlete	Event	Round of 16	Quarterfinals	Semifinals	Final	
Athlete	Event	Opposition Result	Opposition Result	Opposition Result	Opposition Result	Rank
Elizabeth Andiego	Middleweight	Volnova (KAZ); L 11–20	Did not advance			

== Swimming ==
Kenyan swimmers have so far achieved qualifying standards in the following events (up to a maximum of 2 swimmers in each event at the Olympic Qualifying Time (OQT), and 1 at the Olympic Selection Time (OST)):

Men

Athlete	Event	Heat		Semifinal		Final	
Athlete	Event	Time	Rank	Time	Rank	Time	Rank
David Dunford	50 m freestyle	22.72	27	Did not advance			
David Dunford	100 m freestyle	49.60	26	Did not advance			
Jason Dunford	100 m butterfly	52.23	15 Q	52.16	12	Did not advance	

== Weightlifting ==
Kenya has qualified 1 athlete.

Athlete	Event	Snatch		Clean & Jerk		Total	Rank
Athlete	Event	Result	Rank	Result	Rank	Total	Rank
Mercy Apondi Obiero	Women's −69 kg	76	14	105	13	181	13
