= Mulualem Girma Teshale =

Ethiopian swimmer

Personal information
- Nationality: Ethiopia
- Born: December 9, 1987 (age 38) Ambo, Ethiopia
- Height: 5 ft 10 in (179 cm)
- Weight: 132 lb (60 kg)

Mulualem Girma Teshale (born september 12, 1987, in Ambo) the first Ethiopian male swimmer to compete in the Olympic Games. He competed at the 2012 London Summer Olympics in the men's 50 metre freestyle event he competed in the Olympic Games but did not qualify for the final. Results round 1 ranked 7, 50 metre freestyle time 28.99 seconds.
