= Jon Kyong-hui =

North Korean long-distance runner (born 1986)

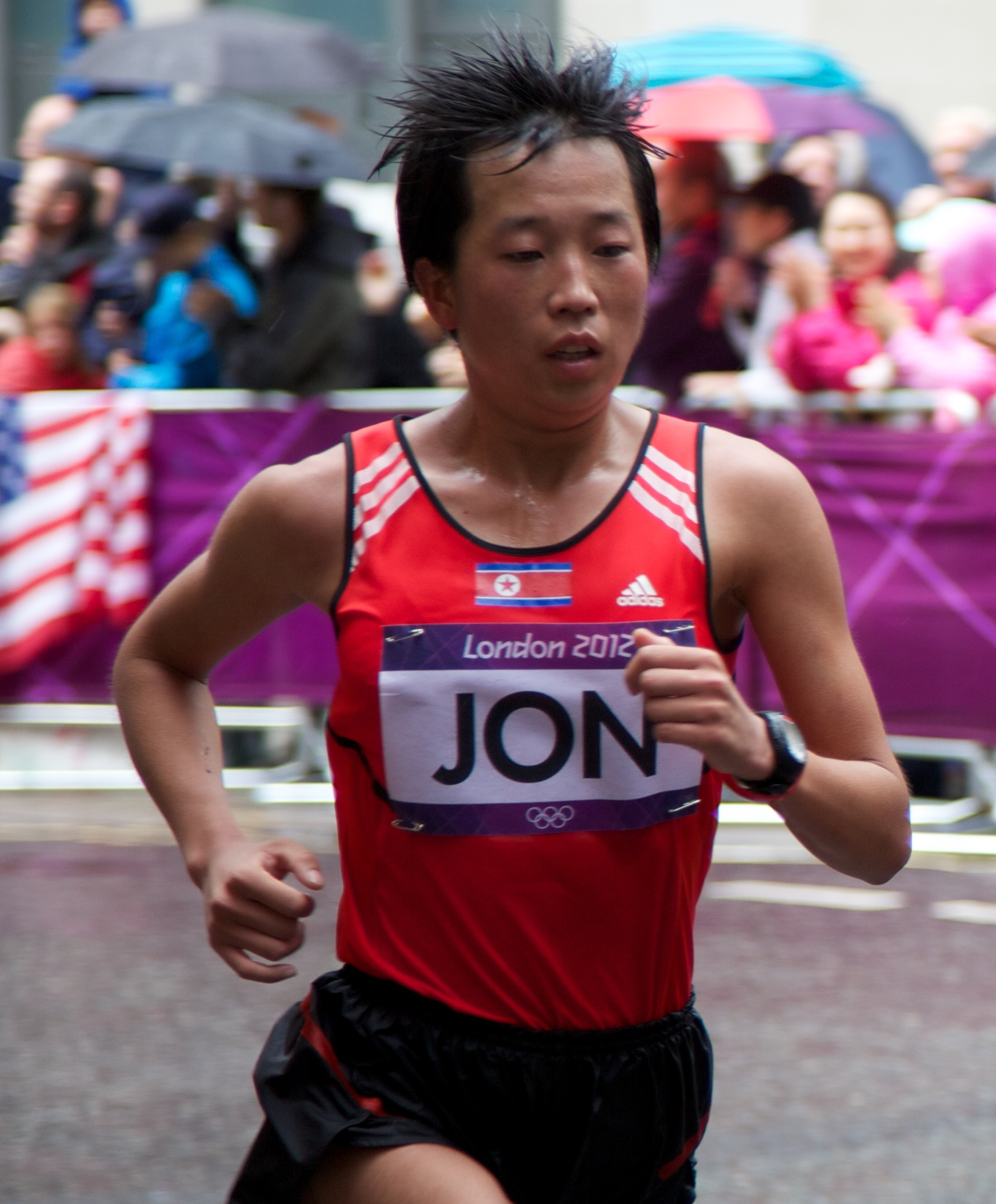
- Jon in the 2012 Summer Olympics marathon

Personal information
- Born: December 12, 1986 (age 39)
- Height: 1.62 m (5 ft 4 in)
- Weight: 51 kg (112 lb)

Sport
- Country: North Korea
- Sport: Athletics
- Event: Marathon

- Jon Kyong-hui
- Hangul: 전경희
- RR: Jeon Gyeonghui
- MR: Chŏn Kyŏnghŭi

Jon Kyong-hui (Korean: 전경희; born December 12, 1986, in Pyongyang) is a North Korean long-distance runner. She competed in the marathon at the 2012 Summer Olympics, placing 56th with a time of 2:35:17.
