= Joyce Chepkirui =

Kenyan long-distance runner (born 1988)

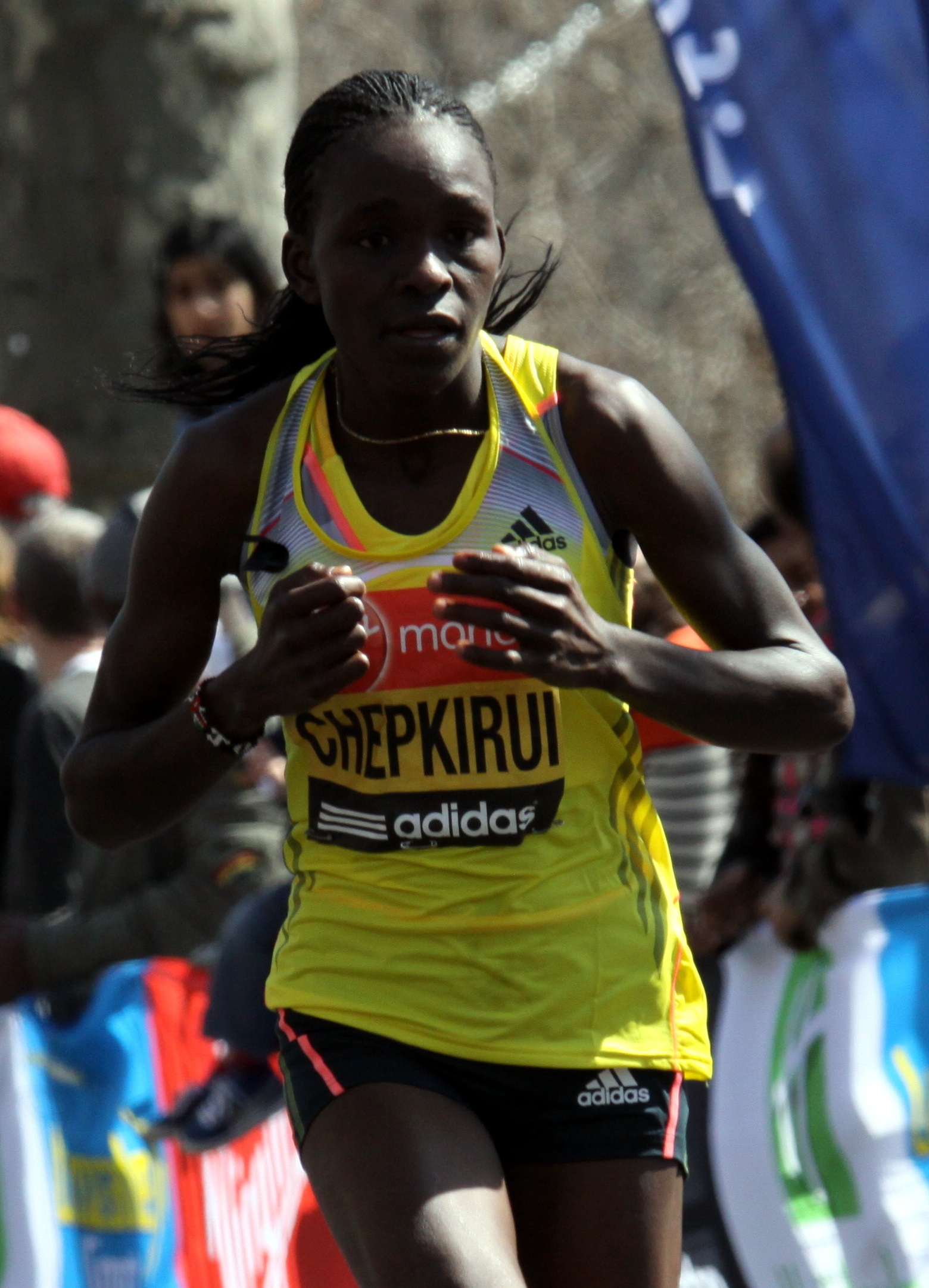
- Joyce Chepkirui during the 2013 London Marathon

Personal information
- Born: 20 August 1988 (age 38)

Sport
- Country: Kenya
Medal record
Women's athletics
Representing Kenya
All Africa Games
Silver medal – second place	2011 Maputo	1500 m
African Championships
Gold medal – first place	2014 Marrakesh	10,000 m
African Cross Country Championships
Gold medal – first place	2012 Cape Town	Senior race
Commonwealth Games
Gold medal – first place	2014 Glasgow	10,000 m

Joyce Chepkirui (born 20 August 1988) is a Kenyan long-distance runner who competes in road running events. She established herself as a half marathon runner, winning races in Granollers, Bogotá and Gothenburg. She set a best of 1:06:19 hours to win the 2014 Prague Half Marathon. She also competes in 10K road races and her personal best of 30:38 minutes makes her fifth fastest woman ever.

Chepkirui began competing in cross country running in 2012 and won the Kenyan and African titles. She also competes on the track over 1500 metres and was the silver medallist at the 2011 All-Africa Games.

== Career ==
Chepkirui grew up in the Buret District of Kenya's Rift Valley Province.

Her first international appearance came at the 2007 African Junior Athletics Championships, where she came fifth in the 1500 metres. She made her debut in the half marathon in Benidorm that November and finished as runner-up. She tried the 3000 metres steeplechase in 2008, but managed only fifth at the national junior championships. She changed her focus to road running competitions the following year. She travelled to Spain and had top five finishes in a number of races, highlighted by a win in Almodóvar del Río with a time of 1:11:47 hours. At the end of the year she placed fourth in the 15K at Kenya's Baringo Half Marathon.

=== 2010 ===
Chepkirui established herself as an elite level half marathon runner in 2010. She won a series of Spanish races, taking titles in Alicante, Torrevieja, Albacete, San Sebastián and Logroño. She improved her best to 1:09:51 hours at the San Sebastián race and also won the Barcelona and Granollers Half Marathons. She was selected to represent Kenya at the 2010 IAAF World Half Marathon Championships and she ran a best of 1:09:30 hours to take fifth place and help Kenya to the team title. She closed the season with further wins in Spain, winning in Córdoba and setting another best of 1:09:25 hours at the Valencia Half Marathon. She ended the year with a win at the 15K Baringo race in Kenya.

=== 2011 ===
She began 2011 with a win at the Lago Maggiore Half Marathon, followed by a fourth-place finish at the Prague Half Marathon. She set a personal best and course record of 1:09:04 hours to win at the Göteborgsvarvet in Sweden in May, then ran a world leading time of 30:43 minutes for the 10K in Appingedam. Taking on a shorter distance, she managed to place second in the 1500 m at the Kenyan Athletics Championships. She won the Bogotá Half Marathon by a margin of twenty seconds, over runner-up Mare Dibaba. She won the Tilburg 10K in September and her time of 30:38 minutes was the fastest in the world that year and made her the fifth quickest ever over the distance. Chepkirui was chosen to compete for Kenya in the 1500 m at the 2011 All-Africa Games and she came away with a silver medal behind her compatriot Irene Jelagat. She won the first women's half marathon title in Baringo with a course record of 1:10:57.1 minutes. The Zatopek 10 was her last outing of the year and she ran a 10,000 metres best and course record of 31:26.10 minutes to continue her long-distance winning streak.

=== 2012 ===
Chepkirui decided to compete in cross country at the start of 2012 and had immediate success, winning the Discovery Kenya Cross Country meet and the national title at the Kenyan Cross Country Championships, before going on to win the gold medal and team title at the 2012 African Cross Country Championships. On the roads, she was runner-up at Puerto Rico's World's Best 10K, finishing behind the double reigning world champion Vivian Cheruiyot, and won at the Prague Half Marathon in a course record time of 1:07:03 hours. This made her the seventh fastest woman ever in the event. She attempted a marathon debut at the 2012 London Marathon, but failed to finish the distance. Chepkirui earned a place on the Kenyan Olympic team by coming second at the 10,000 m trials in June. At the Olympic women's 10,000 metres final she failed to finish the race.

=== 2013 ===
Chepkirui won the World's Best 10K at the start of 2013. Her debut over the marathon distance came at the 2013 London Marathon, but she did not match her success over shorter distances and placed fifteenth overall with a time of 2:35:54 hours. A poor showing of 33:01 minutes for eighth came at the Ottawa 10K a month later, but she had a string of victories in the second half of the year, winning the Beach to Beacon 10K, Falmouth Road Race, Dam tot Damloop, Singelloop Utrecht and the Grand 10 Berlin. Her run of 30:37 minutes in Berlin was a new personal best and the fastest ever on German soil for the 10K distance. A course record of 68:15 minutes at the Valencia Half Marathon followed a week later.

=== 2014 ===
Chepkirui improved her half marathon best at the Prague Half Marathon in April 2014, taking victory in a course record time of 1:06:19 hours. That year, she also won gold in the 10000 m at the 2014 Commonwealth Games.

=== 2015 ===
Chepkirui won both New York Road Runners 10 km in May 2015 and Amsterdam Marathon in 2:24:10 in October 2015.

=== 2016 ===
Chepkirui finished second in the 2016 New York City Half Marathon on March 20 with a time of 1:07:41, narrowly beaten by Molly Huddle at the finish line. Chepkirui finished fourth in the 2016 New York City Marathon in 2:29:08. She was subsequently stripped of this title by a ruling of the Court of Arbitration for Sports, due to anomalies in her athlete biological passport.

== Personal bests ==
- 1500 metres – 4:08.80 (Nairobi, 16 JUL 2011)
- 5000 metres - 15:58.31 (Marrakesh, 14 SEP 2014)
- 10,000 metres – 31:26.10 (Melbourne, 10 DEC 2011)
- 10K road – 30:37 (Berlin, 13 OCT 2013)
- Half marathon – 1:06:18 hours (Prague, 05 APR 2014)
- 25 Kilometres 1:23:27 (Amsterdam, 18 OCT 2015)
- 30 Kilometres 1:40:15 (Amsterdam, 18 OCT 2015)
- Marathon – 2:24:11 (Amsterdam, 18 OCT 2015)

== Personal life ==
Chepkirui is married to Erick Kibet who is also a runner.

== International competition record ==
Year	Competition	Venue	Position	Event	Notes
2007	African Junior Championships	Ouagadougou, Burkina Faso	5th	1500 m	
2010	World Half Marathon Championships	Nanning, China	5th	Half marathon	
2011	All-Africa Games	Maputo, Mozambique	2nd	1500 metres	
2012	African Cross Country Championships	Cape Town, South Africa	1st	Senior race	
2014	Commonwealth Games	Glasgow, United Kingdom	1st	10,000 m	

== See also ==
- List of Commonwealth Games medallists in athletics (women)
- List of African Games medalists in athletics (women)
- List of Australian athletics champions (women)
- List of winners of the Amsterdam Marathon
