= Wang Xueqin =

Chinese long-distance runner

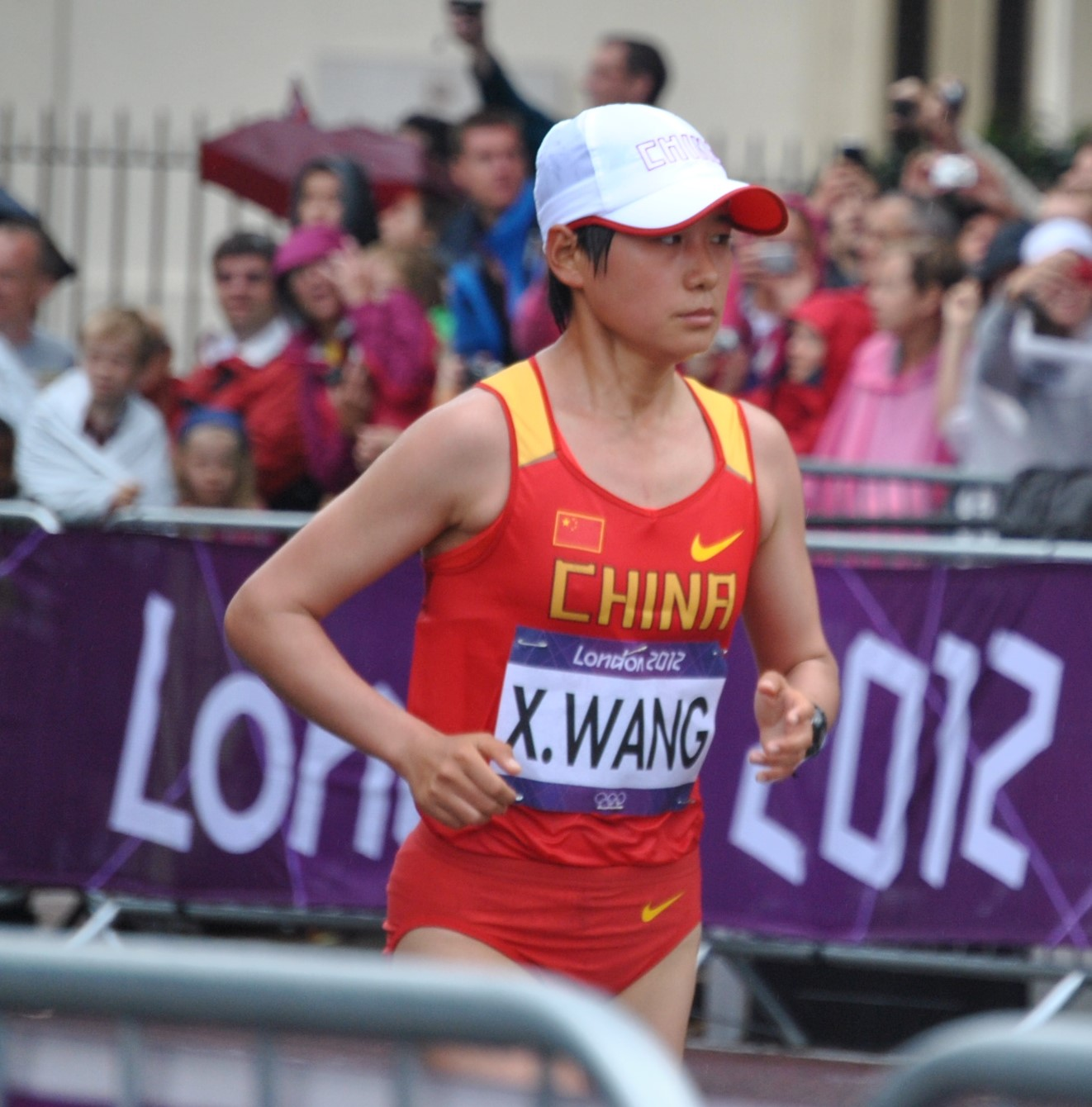

Personal information
- Born: January 1, 1991 (age 35)
- Height: 1.62 m (5 ft 4 in)
- Weight: 50 kg (110 lb)

Sport
- Country: China
- Sport: Athletics
- Event: Marathon

Wang Xueqin (born January 1, 1991, in Jiangsu) is a Chinese long-distance runner. She competed in the marathon at the 2012 Summer Olympics, placing 22nd with a time of 2:28:31.
