= María Elena Espeso =

Spanish long-distance runner

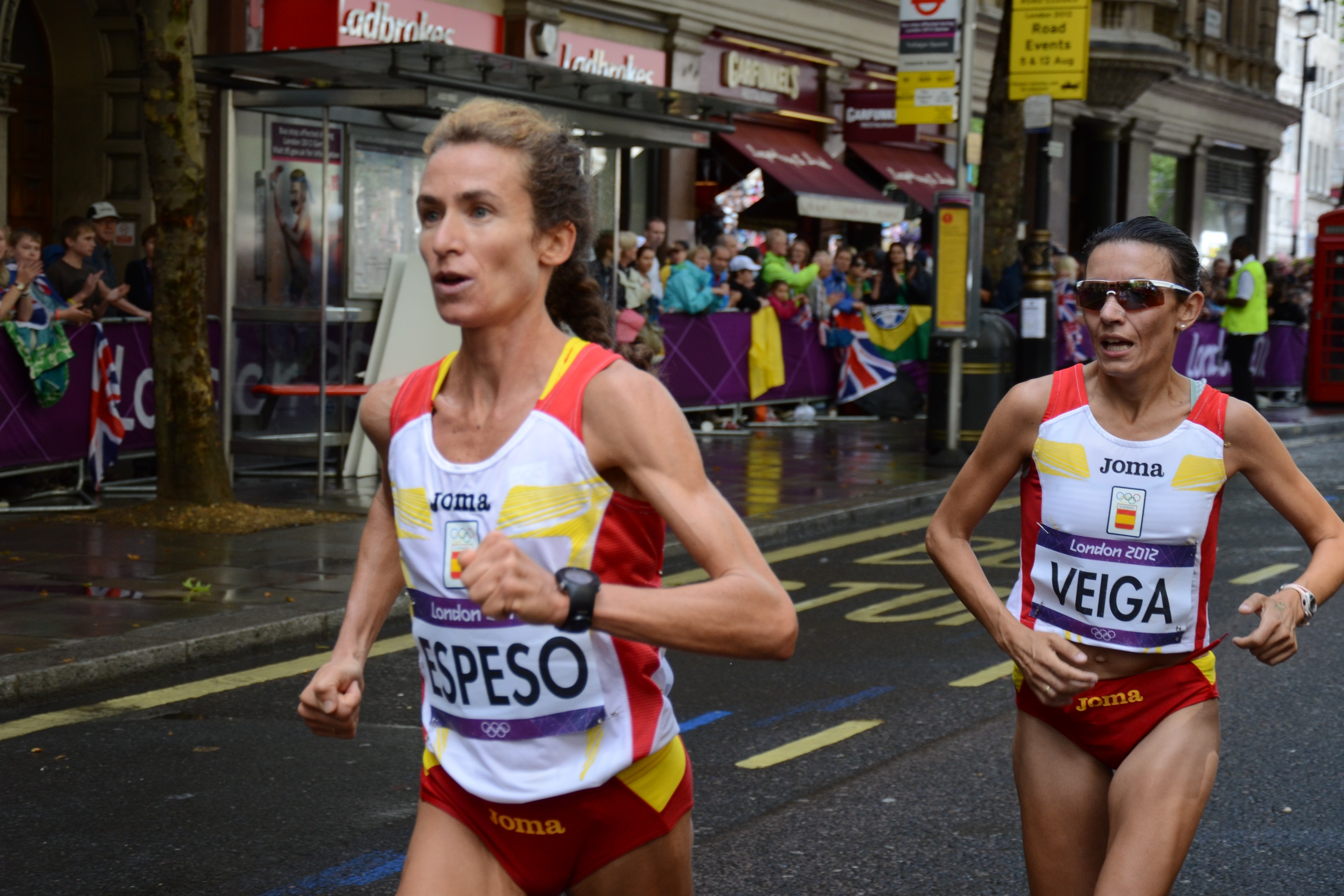
- María Elena Espeso (left) and Vanessa Veiga in the 2012 Summer Olympics marathon

Personal information
- Born: 10 October 1972 (age 53)
- Height: 1.61 m (5 ft 3 1/2 in)
- Weight: 48 kg (106 lb)

Sport
- Country: Spain
- Sport: Athletics
- Event: Marathon

María Elena Espeso (born 10 October 1972) is a Spanish long-distance runner. She competed in the marathon at the 2012 Summer Olympics, placing 61st with a time of 2:36:12.

She was born in Valladolid.
