= Konstantina Kefala =

Greek long-distance runner

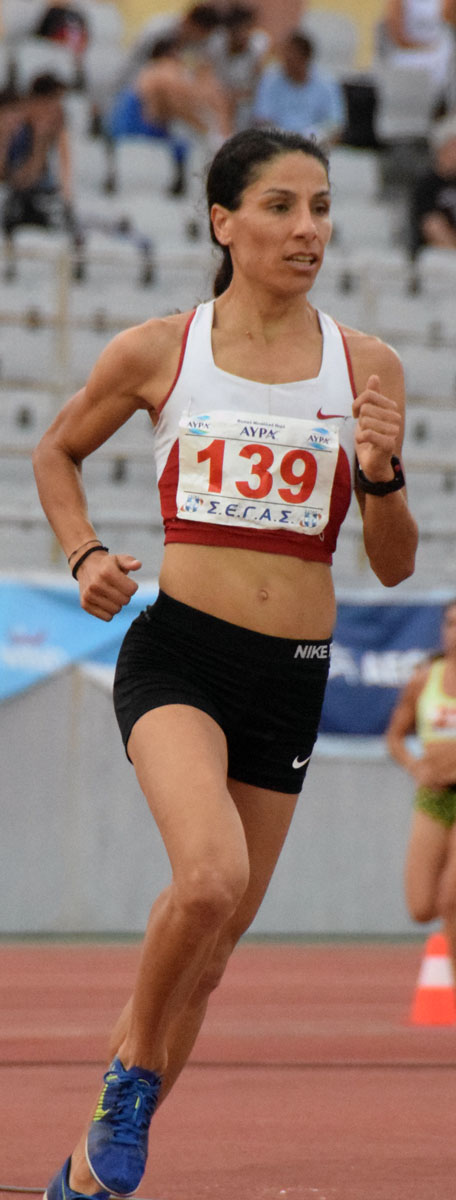

Personal information
- Born: August 9, 1977 (age 48)
- Height: 1.7 m (5 ft 7 in)
- Weight: 56 kg (123 lb)

Sport
- Country: Greece
- Sport: Athletics
- Event: Marathon

Konstantina Kefala (born 9 August 1977 in Las Vegas, Nevada) is a Greek long-distance runner. She competed in the marathon at the 2012 Summer Olympics, placing 104th with a time of 3:01:18.

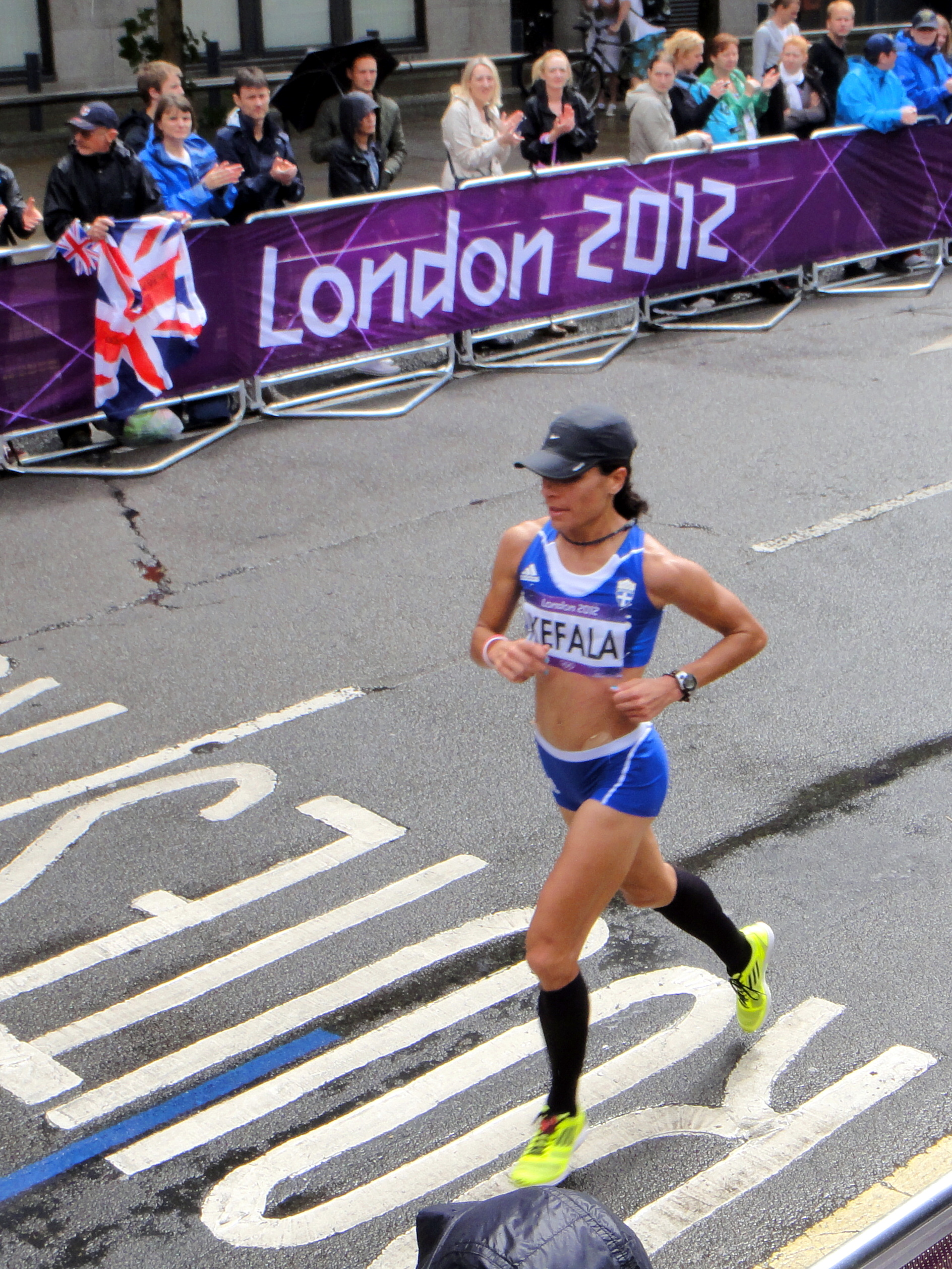
Konstantina Kefala at the 2012 Olympics in London
