= Janet Achola =

Ugandan middle-distance runner

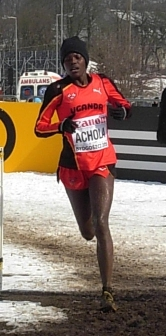
Janet Achola competing at the 2013 World Cross Country Championships

Janet Achola (born 26 June 1988) in Lira, a town in Northern Uganda, is a Ugandan middle-distance runner. At the 2012 Summer Olympics, she competed in the Women's 1500 metres finishing 8th. She also competed at the World Cross Country Championships in 2011 and 2013.
