= Athletics at the 2012 Summer Olympics – Women's 10,000 metres =

Women's 10,000 metres at the Games of the XXX Olympiad
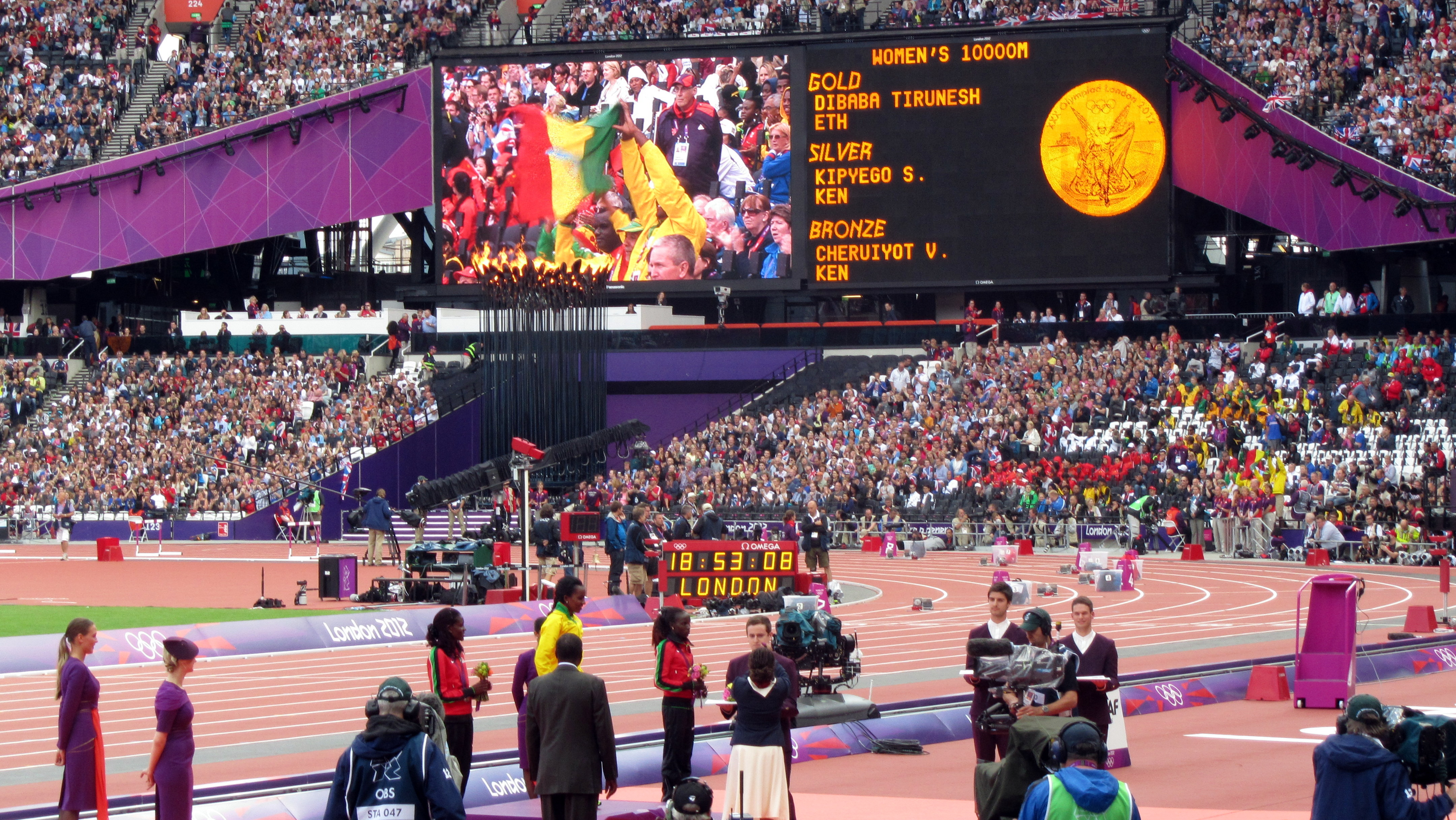
- Women's 10,000 metres victory ceremony
- Venue: Olympic Stadium
- Date: 3 August
- Competitors: 22 from 13 nations
- Winning time: 30:20.75

Medalists
1st place, gold medalist(s)		Tirunesh Dibaba	Ethiopia
2nd place, silver medalist(s)		Sally Kipyego	Kenya
3rd place, bronze medalist(s)		Vivian Cheruiyot	Kenya

Official Video

The women's 10,000 metres competition at the 2012 Summer Olympics in London, United Kingdom was held at Olympic Stadium on 3 August.

The race started off conservatively, led by the three Japanese runners, trailed by Britton who broke away to a 15-meter lead 800 metres into the race, though the peloton reeled that in. After the first 8 laps, the Kenyan and Ethiopian runners moved to the front as other runners dropped off the back, one by one. The field whittled itself down to just the three Kenyan and Ethiopian athletes, trailed by Eshete (Ethiopian born, running for Bahrain). Eshete would set the Bahrain national record in this race. With 7 laps to go, Chepkirui dropped out. In that same move Oljira and Eshete lost a step of contact and were separated from the field. Led by Kidane pushing the pace, it turned into a dual meet. With three laps to go, Kipyego edged into the lead with her move covered by the defending champion Dibaba. World champion Cheruiyot trailed but didn't look like she had the power to push ahead. In the turn with under 600 metres to go, Dibaba put the hammer down, passing Kipyego decisively and charging away. The last lap was a victory sprint for Dibaba with no challenger in sight.

== Competition format ==
Only a final, without preliminary heats, was held.

== Schedule ==
All times are British Summer Time (UTC+1)

Date	Time	Round
Friday, 3 August 2012	21:25	Finals

== Records ==
Prior to the competition, the existing World and Olympic records were as follows.

World record	Wang Junxia (CHN)	29:31.78	Beijing, China	8 September 1993
Olympic record	Tirunesh Dibaba (ETH)	29:54.66	Beijing, China	15 August 2008
2012 World leading	Tirunesh Dibaba (ETH)	30:24.39	Eugene, OR, United States	1 June 2012
Broken records during the 2012 Summer Olympics
2012 World leading	Tirunesh Dibaba (ETH)	30:20.75	London, United Kingdom	3 August 2012

== Results ==
- Official Photofinish 3 August 2012.

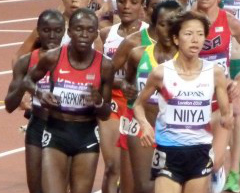

Rank	Name	Nationality	Time	Notes	Lane
1st place, gold medalist(s)	Tirunesh Dibaba	Ethiopia	30:20.75	WL	16
2nd place, silver medalist(s)	Sally Kipyego	Kenya	30:26.37	PB	8
3rd place, bronze medalist(s)	Vivian Cheruiyot	Kenya	30:30.44	PB	11
4	Werknesh Kidane	Ethiopia	30:39.38	SB	4
5	Beleynesh Oljira	Ethiopia	30:45.56		7
6	Shitaye Eshete	Bahrain	30:47.25	NR	19
7	Joanne Pavey	Great Britain	30:53.20	PB	1
8	Julia Bleasdale	Great Britain	30:55.63	PB	21
9	Hitomi Niiya	Japan	30:59.19	PB	3
10	Kayoko Fukushi	Japan	31:10.35	SB	20
11	Amy Hastings	United States	31:10.69	PB	10
12	Janet Cherobon-Bawcom	United States	31:12.68	PB	22
13	Lisa Uhl	United States	31:12.80	PB	9
14	Sara Moreira	Portugal	31:16.44	PB	6
15	Fionnuala Britton	Ireland	31:46.71		18
16	Mika Yoshikawa	Japan	31:47.67		14
17	Sabrina Mockenhaupt	Germany	31:50.35		2
18	Nadia Ejjafini	Italy	31:57.03		17
19	Olha Skrypak	Ukraine	32:14.59		13
20	Eloise Wellings	Australia	32:25.43		15
DNF	Joyce Chepkirui	Kenya	N/A		12
DSQ	Elizaveta Grechishnikova	Russia	~~32:11.32~~	Doping	5

Elizaveta Grechishnikova of Russia originally finished 19th but was later disqualified for doping
