= Athletics at the 2012 Summer Olympics – Men's 10,000 metres =

Men's 10,000 metres at the Games of the XXX Olympiad
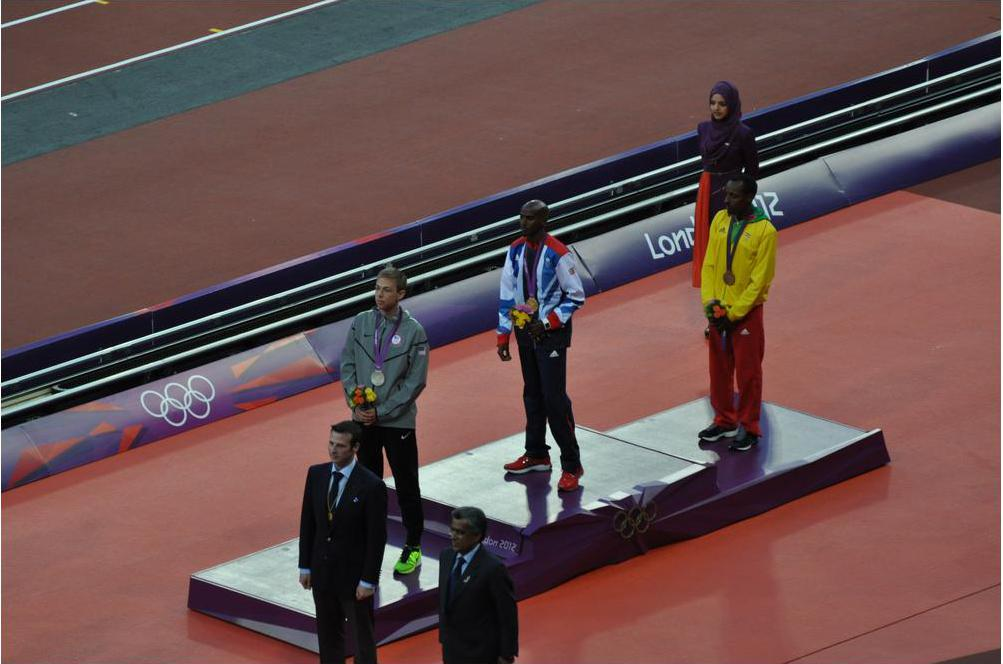
- Podium
- Venue: Olympic Stadium
- Date: 4 August
- Competitors: 29 from 18 nations
- Winning time: 27:30.42

Medalists
1st place, gold medalist(s)		Mo Farah	Great Britain
2nd place, silver medalist(s)		Galen Rupp	United States
3rd place, bronze medalist(s)		Tariku Bekele	Ethiopia

Official Video

The Men's 10,000 metres competition at the 2012 Summer Olympics in London, United Kingdom. The event was held at the Olympic Stadium on 4 August. The race was won by 0.48 seconds by Mo Farah, the reigning 5000 metres World Champion, in a time of 27:30.42.

== Summary ==
From the beginning Farah stayed close to the race leaders, who on the first lap were the defending champion Kenenisa Bekele and his brother Tariku. After six laps, the half marathon world record holder Zersenay Tadese and his Eritrean teammates began to push the pace. At the same time, Moses Kipsiro went down, causing the field to scatter and Farah to fall back in the field with his American training partner Galen Rupp. When Tariku Bekele came up behind Tadese, his attempt to force the pace slowed. The 5000 metre mark was reached in 14:05.79, with Tadese in front, though Bedan Karoki Muchiri took the lead soon after. Thirteen runners remained in the lead pack including three Ethiopians, three Eritreans, two Kenyans, Kipsiro, Kenyan born Polat Kemboi Arikan running for Turkey, Canadian Cameron Levins, Farah and Rupp. Strategic play continued as Tariku elbowed Farah, causing him to step to the outside ready to cover a move. Then the third Ethiopian Gebregziabher Gebremariam, ran to the front, but rather than forcing the pace, he seemed to slow it down. With two laps to go, Tariku Bekele regained the lead, with Farah on his shoulder and Moses Ndiema Masai, Rupp and Michuri following in close formation. At the start of the final lap, Farah made his move into the lead. For most of the last lap, Tariku Bekele, Muchuri, Rupp, and Kenenisa Bekele respectively remained in tow until the final turn at which point Farah pulled away for the win with a final lap of 53.48 seconds. With 60m left, Rupp went outside and outsprinted Tariku Bekele to take the silver medal. Tariku Bekele held on for third place just ahead of his older brother and world record holder Kenenisa Bekele.

== 'Super Saturday' ==
Farah's gold medal was the final of three gold medals in one evening for the host country, their most successful day in Olympic history.

== Competition format ==
Only a final, without preliminary heats, was held.

== Records ==
Prior to this competition, the existing world and Olympic records were as follows:

World record	Kenenisa Bekele (ETH)	26:17.53	Brussels, Belgium	26 August 2005
Olympic record	Kenenisa Bekele (ETH)	27:01.17	Beijing, China	17 August 2008
2012 World leading	Wilson Kiprop (KEN)	27:01.98	Eugene, OR, United States	1 June 2012

== Schedule ==
All times are British Summer Time (UTC+1)

Date	Time	Round
Saturday, 4 August 2012	21:15	Finals

== Results ==
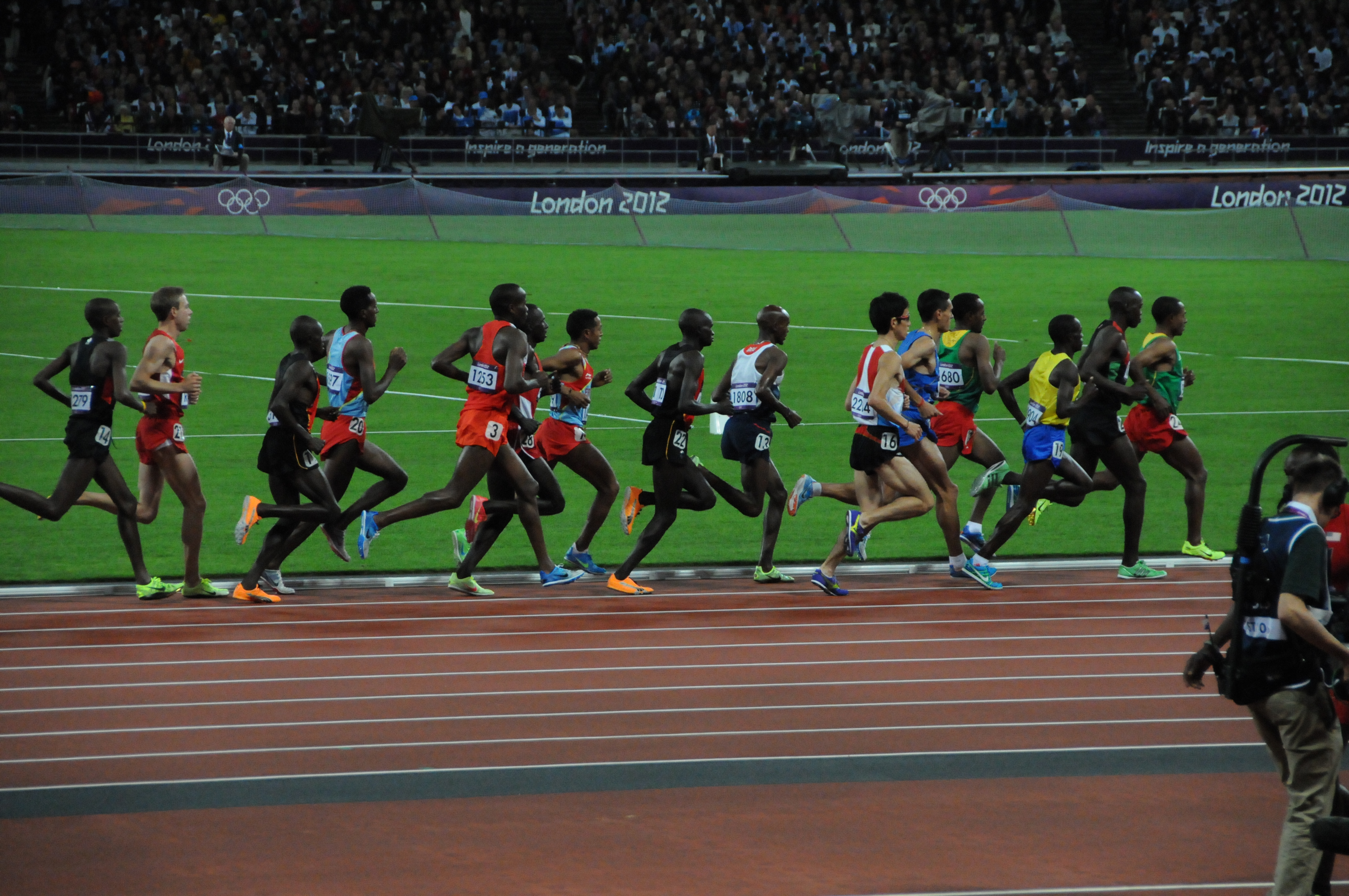

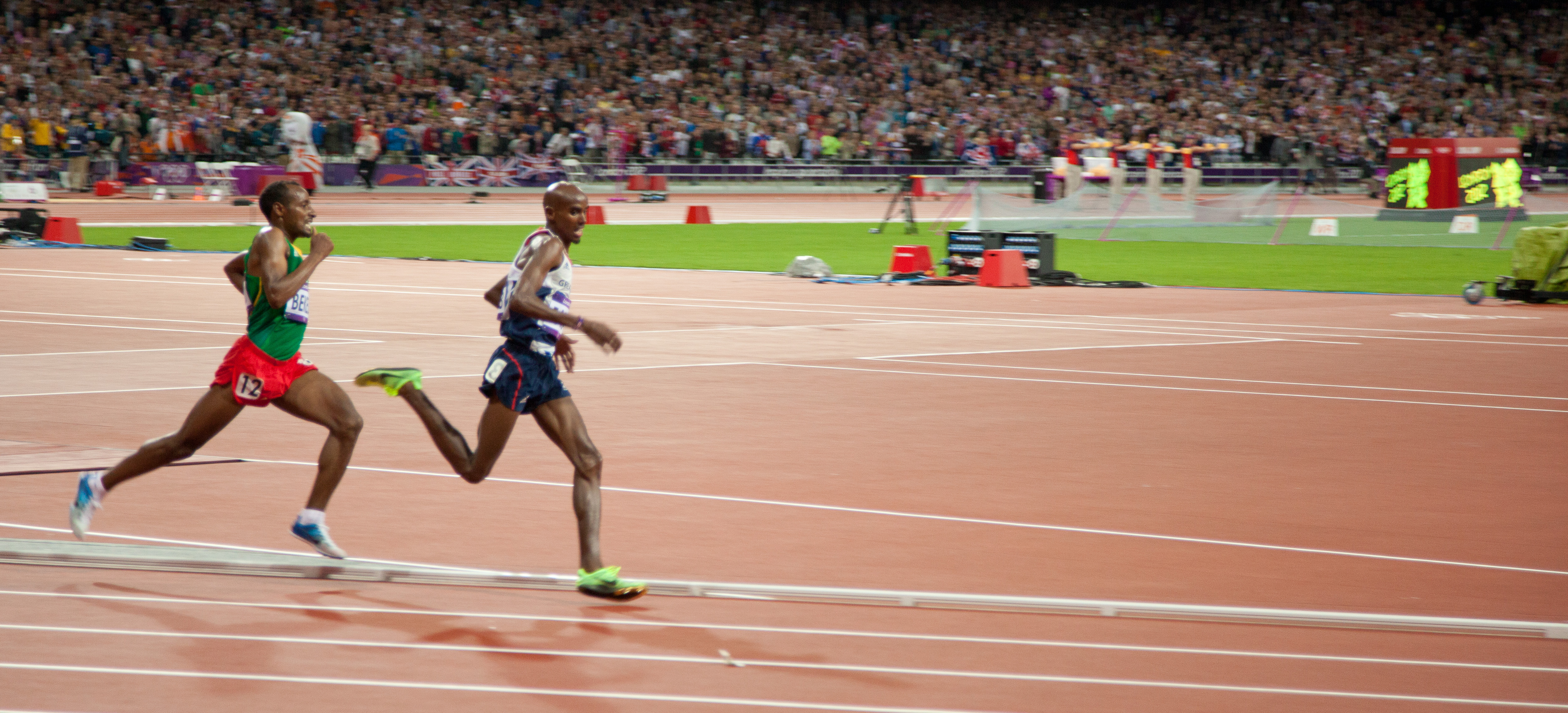
Farah leading Bekele in the final turn

Rank	Name	Nationality	Result	Notes
1st place, gold medalist(s)	Mo Farah	Great Britain	27:30.42	
2nd place, silver medalist(s)	Galen Rupp	United States	27:30.90	
3rd place, bronze medalist(s)	Tariku Bekele	Ethiopia	27:31.43	
4	Kenenisa Bekele	Ethiopia	27:32.44	
5	Bedan Karoki Muchiri	Kenya	27:32.94	
6	Zersenay Tadese	Eritrea	27:33.51	
7	Teklemariam Medhin	Eritrea	27:34.76	
8	Gebregziabher Gebremariam	Ethiopia	27:36.34	
9	Polat Kemboi Arikan	Turkey	27:38.81	PB
10	Moses Ndiema Kipsiro	Uganda	27:39.22	
11	Cameron Levins	Canada	27:40.68	
12	Moses Ndiema Masai	Kenya	27:41.34	
13	Dathan Ritzenhein	United States	27:45.89	
14	Robert Kajuga	Rwanda	27:56.67	PB
15	Nguse Tesfaldet	Eritrea	27:56.78	
16	Thomas Ayeko	Uganda	27:58.96	
17	Moukheld Al-Outaibi	Saudi Arabia	28:07.25	
18	Mohammed Ahmed	Canada	28:13.91	
19	Matthew Tegenkamp	United States	28:18.26	
20	Ben St.Lawrence	Australia	28:32.67	
21	Diego Estrada	Mexico	28:36.19	
22	Yuki Sato	Japan	28:44.06	
23	Ayad Lamdassem	Spain	28:49.85	
24	Daniele Meucci	Italy	28:57.46	
25	Christopher Thompson	Great Britain	29:06.14	
26	Mykola Labovskyy	Ukraine	29:32.12	
–	Ali Hasan Mahboob	Bahrain	DNF	
–	Bayron Piedra	Ecuador	DNF	
–	Wilson Kiprop	Kenya	DNF	
