= Tiki Gelana =

Ethiopian long-distance runner (born 1987)

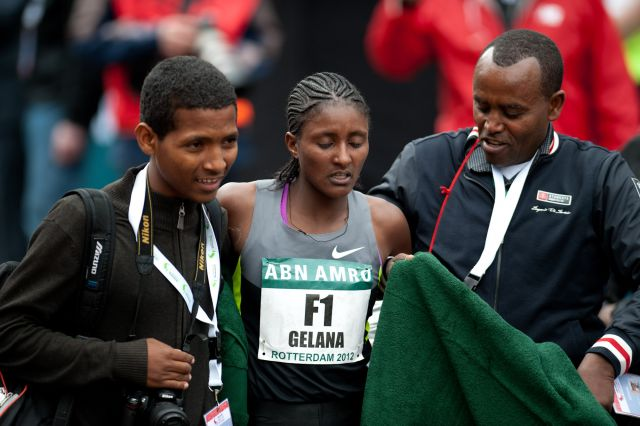
- Tiki Gelana at the 2012 Rotterdam Marathon

Personal information
- Nationality: Ethiopian
- Born: 22 October 1987 (age 38) Bekoji, Ethiopia
- Height: 1.65 m (5 ft 5 in)
- Weight: 48 kg (106 lb)

Sport
- Country: Ethiopia
- Sport: Athletics
- Event: Long distance running

Achievements and titles
- Personal bests: Half marathon: 1:08:48 (2012); Marathon: 2:18:58 (2012)
Medal record
Women's athletics
Representing Ethiopia
Olympic Games
Gold medal – first place	2012 London	Marathon

Erba Tiki Gelana (Amharic: ኧርባ ቲኪ ገላና; born 22 October 1987) is an Ethiopian long-distance runner who competes in marathon races. Her personal best of 2:18:58 remained the Ethiopian national record for the event from 2012 to 2017. She won the 2011 Amsterdam Marathon and the 2012 Rotterdam Marathon. She won the gold medal at the 2012 London Olympics with a time of 2:23:07, a new Olympic record.

== Biography ==
A cousin of 2000 Olympic marathon champion Gezahegne Abera, Gelana was born on 22 October 1987 in Jijiga, capital city of Ethiopia's Somali Region and a town renowned for producing top runners. She began competing in road races in Ethiopia and came fourth at the 2004 Great Ethiopian Run. She went to Catalonia in Spain in 2006 and made her debut over the half marathon distance, including wins in Mataró and Terrassa. She won the San Silvestre Barcelonesa 10K race at the end of the year. She travelled to Japan in 2007 and won the 10K at the Sanyo Road Race – her time of 31:54 minutes made her the third fastest Ethiopian that year. She won the 2008 Women First 5K in Addis Ababa in March, then came fourth at the high-profile World 10K Bangalore in May. She debuted on the European track and field circuit that summer and set a 5000 metres best of 15:17.74 minutes at the Internationales Stadionfest and a 10,000 metres best of 31:27.80 minutes at the Ostrava Golden Spike.

In late 2008, Gelana took sixth place at the Delhi Half Marathon with a time of 1:10:22 hours, but she was two minutes slower at the 2009 RAK Half Marathon, finishing 16th. but managed second place behind Abebu Gelan at the Virginia Beach Half Marathon in her American debut. Her marathon debut followed in October at the Dublin Marathon and in a close finish she took third place on the podium. In 2010, she came fourth at both the Los Angeles Marathon and the Dublin Marathon, although she improved her best to 2:29:53 hours.

The 2011 Amsterdam Marathon marked a breakthrough for Gelana as she won the race in a time of 2:22:08 hours – almost eight minutes faster than her previous best and an improvement upon Gete Wami's nine-year-old course record. At the end of that year she returned to Ethiopia, where she came runner-up at the Great Ethiopian Run and third at the Ethiopian Clubs Cross Country Championships. She improved her personal best at the Kagawa Marugame Half Marathon in February 2012, going unchallenged to win the race in 1:08:48 hours.

She broke the Ethiopian record at the 2012 Rotterdam Marathon, completing a solo run of 2:18:58 hours to win the race almost five minutes ahead of runner-up Valeria Straneo. This made her the fourth fastest woman ever over the distance. She was selected to represent Ethiopia in the Olympic marathon as a result. At the London 2012 Olympics she won the gold medal at the marathon with an Olympic record time of 2:23:07 hours, in spite of rain throughout the race and a fall at the water station. After the Olympics she ran a personal best for the half marathon, recording 1:07:48 for third at the Great North Run, then ran a 15 km best of 48:09 minutes at the Zevenheuvelenloop (finishing behind Olympic 10,000 m champion Tirunesh Dibaba at both races). She was chosen at the AIMS World Athlete of the Year Award for her performances that year.

In her first outing of 2013 she held off Kim Smith to defend her Marugame Half Marathon title.

Competing in the 2013 London Marathon, Gelana was knocked to the ground in a collision with wheelchair racer Josh Cassidy at the 15 km feeding station. Although able to resume, she dropped off the lead pace in the second half of the race and finished in 16th place in a time of 2:36:55 hours. The incident prompted London Marathon organisers to alter starting arrangements for the 2014 edition to allow wheelchair athletes to start ahead of the women's race.

Gelana was selected for the Ethiopian team to contest the marathon at the 2013 world championships in Moscow, but dropped out of the race held in hot and humid conditions after just 5 km. Her early withdrawal, together with that of teammate Meseret Hailu, prompted the Ethiopian Athletics Federation to ask the pair to submit written explanations for their actions.

Returning to the London Marathon in 2014, Gelana finished in ninth place in a time of 2:26:58 hours, over six minutes behind winner Edna Kiplagat.

== Personal bests ==
- 10,000 metres – 31:27.80 min (2008)
- 10 km road – 31:54 min (2007)
- 15 km road - 48:09 min (2012)
- Half marathon – 1:08:48 hours (2012)
- Marathon – 2:18:58 hours (2012)

== Road race wins ==
- Amsterdam Marathon: 2011
- Kagawa-Marugame Half Marathon: 2012, 2013
- Rotterdam Marathon: 2012
- Olympic marathon: 2012
