= Athletics at the 2012 Summer Olympics – Women's marathon =

Women's marathon at the Games of the XXX Olympiad
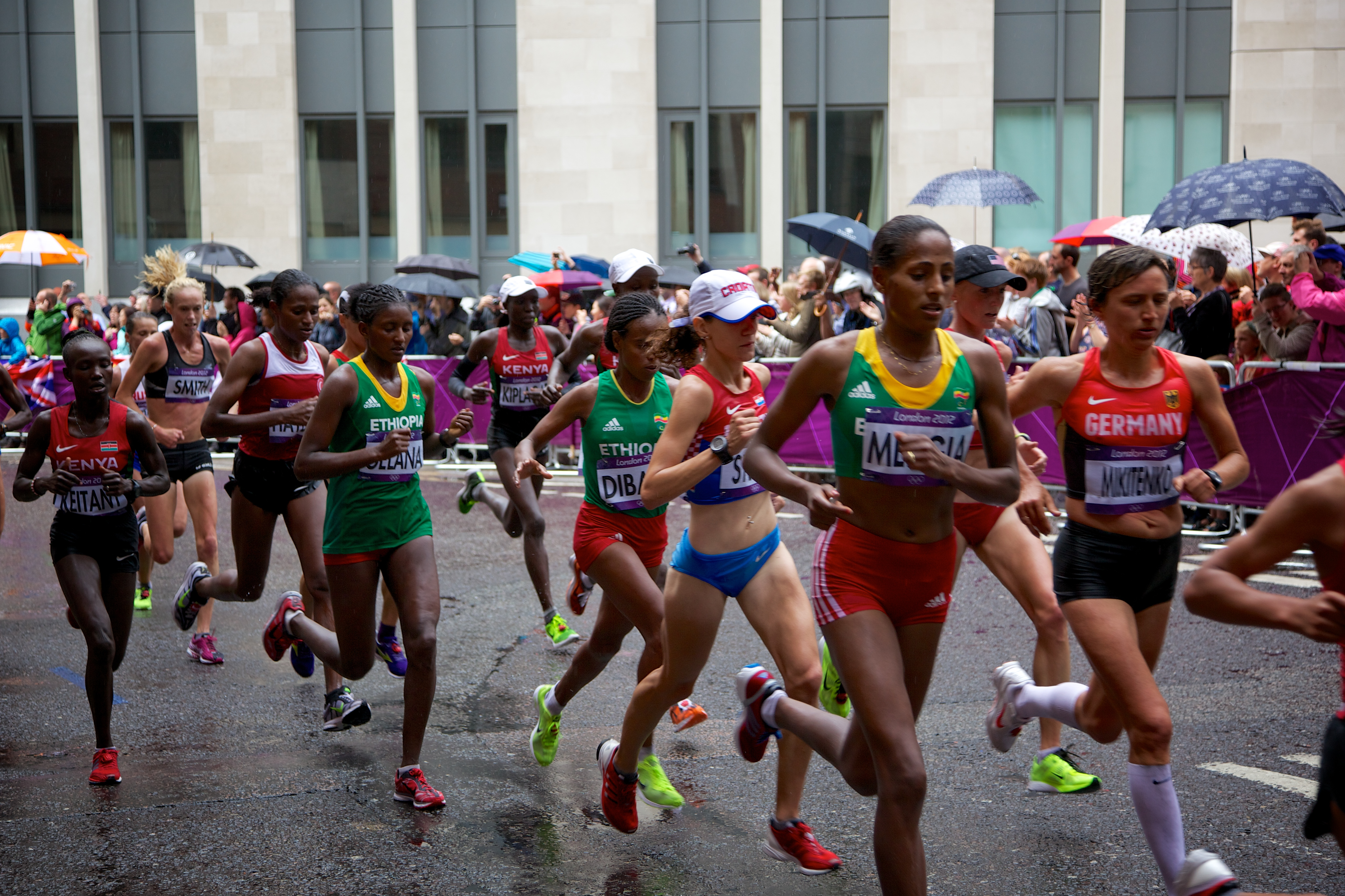
- A group of runners in the marathon, including eventual winner Tiki Gelana (leftmost green shirt).
- Venue: Marathon course, central London
- Date: 5 August 2012
- Competitors: 118 from 67 nations
- Winning time: 2:23:07 OR

Medalists
1st place, gold medalist(s)		Tiki Gelana	Ethiopia
2nd place, silver medalist(s)		Priscah Jeptoo	Kenya
3rd place, bronze medalist(s)		Tatyana Petrova Arkhipova	Russia

Official Video

The women's marathon at the 2012 Olympic Games in London was held on the Olympic marathon street course on 5 August.

The course started and finished on The Mall in central London. Runners completed one short circuit of 2.219 miles around part of the City of Westminster and then three longer circuits of 8 miles around Westminster, the Victoria Embankment and the City of London. The course was designed to pass many of London's best known landmarks, including Buckingham Palace, Trafalgar Square, St Paul's Cathedral, the Guildhall, Leadenhall Market, the Monument, the Tower of London and the Houses of Parliament.

Tiki Gelana from Ethiopia won the gold medal, completing the course in an Olympic record-breaking time of 2 hours 23 minutes 7 seconds. Kenya's Priscah Jeptoo finished second to win silver and Tatyana Petrova Arkhipova, representing Russia, took bronze.

== Records ==
Prior to this event, the existing world and Olympic records were as follows:

World record	Paula Radcliffe (GBR)	2:15:25	London, United Kingdom	13 April 2003
Olympic record	Naoko Takahashi (JPN)	2:23:14	Sydney, Australia	24 September 2000
2012 World leading	Mary Keitany (KEN)	2:18:37	London, United Kingdom	22 April 2012

The following new Olympic record was set during this competition:

Date	Event	Athlete	Time	Notes
5 August	Final	Tiki Gelana (ETH)	2:23:07	OR

== Schedule ==
All times are British Summer Time (UTC+1)

Date	Time	Round
Sunday, 5 August 2012	11:00	Final

== Race overview ==
Starting in the rain, no athlete wanted to run hard from the start. Instead it was a large pack of runners, at times forming a wall across the streets. The pack slowly whittled itself down by 12 km; the ever-present Valeria Straneo emerged to take the point position on the front. Over the next several kilometres, as the rain subsided, Xiaolin Zhu emerged as Straneo's shadow through the half marathon mark in 1:13:13.

Shortly after the half-way mark, Tiki Gelana fell trying to negotiate a water station. Then the lead pack began to take a more serious focus with three Kenyans taking up the pace. Gelana rejoined the pack. Though the pace again slowed, attrition continued. By 28 km the leaders were down to just the three Kenyans and two Ethiopians; Gelana and Mare Dibaba, with Priscah Jeptoo always on the outside. The first to crack was Dibaba. Meanwhile, the significantly less experienced Tatyana Petrova Arkhipova worked her way from far off the pace, past the rest of the athletes who had fallen out of the pack. Arkhipova caught the leaders from behind at 32 km. Just as Arkhipova arrived, the reigning world champion Edna Ngeringwony Kiplagat fell back, though she worked her way back into the lead group a kilometre later.

At the 35 km water stop, Arkhipova accelerated, losing Kiplagat again, this time for good. It was a pack of four through the next 5 km. At 1500 m from the finish Mary Jepkosgei Keitany was the first from the group of four to fall off. At the same time, Gelana accelerated, leaving first Arkhipova, then Jeptoo. A grimacing Gelana powered home to narrowly beat the Olympic record. Tetyana Hamera-Shmyrko came from as far back as 23rd place to take fifth.

== Result ==
- Entrants as of 27 July 2012.

Rank	Name	Nationality	Time	Notes
1st place, gold medalist(s)	Tiki Gelana	Ethiopia	2:23:07	OR
2nd place, silver medalist(s)	Priscah Jeptoo	Kenya	2:23:12	
3rd place, bronze medalist(s)	Tatyana Petrova Arkhipova	Russia	2:23:29	PB
4	Mary Jepkosgei Keitany	Kenya	2:23:56	
5	Tetyana Hamera-Shmyrko	Ukraine	2:24:32	Disqualified (Doping)
6	Zhu Xiaolin	China	2:24:48	
7	Jéssica Augusto	Portugal	2:25:11	
8	Valeria Straneo	Italy	2:25:27	
9	Albina Mayorova	Russia	2:25:38	
10	Shalane Flanagan	United States	2:25:51	
11	Kara Goucher	United States	2:26:07	
12	Helalia Johannes	Namibia	2:26:09	NR
13	Marisa Barros	Portugal	2:26:13	
14	Irina Mikitenko	Germany	2:26:44	
15	Kim Smith	New Zealand	2:26:59	
16	Ryoko Kizaki	Japan	2:27:16	
17	Lisa Jane Weightman	Australia	2:27:32	PB
18	Isabellah Andersson	Sweden	2:27:36	
19	Yoshimi Ozaki	Japan	2:27:43	
20	Edna Kiplagat	Kenya	2:27:52	
21	Ana Dulce Félix	Portugal	2:28:12	
22	Wang Xueqin	China	2:28:21	
23	Mare Dibaba	Ethiopia	2:28:48	
24	Hilda Kibet	Netherlands	2:28:52	
25	Inés Melchor	Peru	2:28:54	NR
26	Alessandra Aguilar	Spain	2:29:19	
27	Rasa Drazdauskaitė	Lithuania	2:29:29	PB
28	Diana Lobačevskė	Lithuania	2:29:32	PB
29	Anna Incerti	Italy	2:29:38	
30	Rosaria Console	Italy	2:30:09	
31	Diane Nukuri	Burundi	2:30:13	NR
32	Susanne Hahn	Germany	2:30:22	
33	Nastassia Staravoitava	Belarus	2:30:25	
34	Sviatlana Kouhan	Belarus	2:30:26	
35	René Kalmer	South Africa	2:30:51	
36	Karolina Jarzyńska	Poland	2:30:57	
37	Souad Aït Salem	Algeria	2:31:15	
38	Beata Naigambo	Namibia	2:31:16	
39	Jessica Trengove	Australia	2:31:17	
40	Jessica Draskau-Petersson	Denmark	2:31:43	PB
41	Chung Yun-Hee	South Korea	2:31:58	
42	Aselefech Mergia	Ethiopia	2:32:03	
43	Gladys Tejeda	Peru	2:32:07	PB
44	Freya Murray	Great Britain	2:32:14	
45	Lidia Șimon	Romania	2:32:46	SB
46	Marisol Romero	Mexico	2:33:08	
47	Adriana Aparecida da Silva	Brazil	2:33:15	
48	Olena Burkovska	Ukraine	2:33:26	
49	Kim Kum-ok	North Korea	2:33:30	
50	Karina Pérez	Mexico	2:33:30	
51	Erika Abril	Colombia	2:33:33	NR
52	Lisa Stublić	Croatia	2:34:03	
53	Maja Neuenschwander	Switzerland	2:34:50	
54	Andrea Mayr	Austria	2:34:51	
55	Wilma Arizapana	Peru	2:35:09	
56	Jon Kyong-Hui	North Korea	2:35:17	
57	Claire Hallissey	Great Britain	2:35:39	
58	Wang Jiali	China	2:35:46	
59	Rehaset Mehari	Eritrea	2:35:49	
60	Iuliia Andreeva	Kyrgyzstan	2:36:01	
61	María Elena Espeso	Spain	2:36:12	
62	Lishan Dula	Bahrain	2:36:20	
63	Bahar Doğan	Turkey	2:36:35	
64	Érika Olivera	Chile	2:36:41	SB
65	Natalia Cercheș	Moldova	2:37:13	PB
66	Linda Byrne	Ireland	2:37:13	
67	Ivana Sekyrová	Czech Republic	2:37:14	
68	Ava Hutchinson	Ireland	2:37:17	
69	Natalia Romero	Chile	2:37:47	
70	Dailín Belmonte	Cuba	2:38:08	PB
71	Ana Subotić	Serbia	2:38:22	
72	Sultan Haydar	Turkey	2:38:26	
73	Samira Raif	Morocco	2:38:31	SB
74	Kim Mi-Gyong	North Korea	2:38:33	
75	Remalda Kergytė	Lithuania	2:39:01	
76	Lim Kyung-Hee	South Korea	2:39:03	
77	Slađana Perunović	Montenegro	2:39:07	NR
78	Volha Dubouskaya	Belarus	2:39:12	
79	Risa Shigetomo	Japan	2:40:06	
80	Amira Ben Amor	Tunisia	2:40:13	NR
81	Tanith Maxwell	South Africa	2:40:27	
82	María Peralta	Argentina	2:40:50	
83	Rosa Chacha	Ecuador	2:40:57	SB
84	Triyaningsih	Indonesia	2:41:15	
85	Beata Rakonczai	Hungary	2:41:20	
86	Constantina Diță	Romania	2:41:34	
87	Leena Puotiniemi	Finland	2:42:01	
88	Žana Jereb	Slovenia	2:42:50	
89	Ümmü Kiraz	Turkey	2:43:07	
90	Mamorallo Tjoka	Lesotho	2:43:15	SB
91	Gabriela Traña	Costa Rica	2:43:17	
92	Zsofia Erdelyi	Hungary	2:44:45	
93	Jane Suuto	Uganda	2:44:46	
94	Yolimar Pineda	Venezuela	2:45:16	
95	Anikó Kálovics	Hungary	2:45:55	
96	Kim Seongeun	South Korea	2:46:38	
97	Vanessa Veiga	Spain	2:46:53	
98	Dace Lina	Latvia	2:47:47	
99	Katarína Berešová	Slovakia	2:48:11	
100	Benita Willis	Australia	2:49:38	
101	Claudette Mukasakindi	Rwanda	2:51:07	
102	Otgonbayar Luvsanlundeg	Mongolia	2:52:15	
103	Evelin Talts	Estonia	2:54:15	
104	Konstadina Kefala	Greece	3:01:18	
105	Ni Lar San	Myanmar	3:04:27	
106	Juventina Napoleão	Timor-Leste	3:05:07	PB
107	Caitriona Jennings	Ireland	3:22:11	
–	Lucia Kimani	Bosnia and Herzegovina	–	DNF
–	Desiree Davila	United States	–	DNF
–	Mara Yamauchi	Great Britain	–	DNF
–	Tetyana Filonyuk	Ukraine	–	DNF
–	Olivera Jevtić	Serbia	–	DNF
–	Soumiya Labani	Morocco	–	DNF
–	Sharon Tavengwa	Zimbabwe	–	DNF
–	Lornah Kiplagat	Netherlands	–	DNF
–	Yolanda Caballero	Colombia	–	DNF
–	Irvette van Blerk	South Africa	–	DNF
–	Liliya Shobukhova	Russia	–	DNF, DSQ
