= Volha Dubouskaya =

Belarusian long-distance runner

Personal information
- Born: October 9, 1983 (age 42)
- Height: 1.7 m (5 ft 7 in)
- Weight: 52 kg (115 lb)

Sport
- Country: Belarus
- Sport: Athletics
- Event: Marathon

Volha Dubouskaya (Belarusian: Вольга Дубоўская, née Salevich - Салевіч; born 9 October 1983 in Bolshie Shilovichi) is a Belarusian long-distance runner. She competed in the marathon at the 2012 Summer Olympics, placing 78th with a time of 2:39:12.
