= Irene Jelagat =

Kenyan middle-distance runner

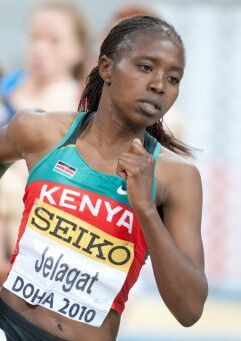

Personal information
- Born: 10 December 1988 (age 37)
Medal record
Women's athletics
Representing Kenya
All-Africa Games
Gold medal – first place	2011 Maputo	1500 m

Irene Jelagat (born 10 December 1988) is a Kenyan middle-distance runner who specializes in the 1500 metres.

She won the gold medal at the 2006 World Junior Championships, with a personal best time of 4:08.88 minutes, and finished fifth at the 2008 African Championships.

Jelegat represented Kenya in the 1500 m at the 2008 Beijing Olympics, but did not progress beyond the heats stage. She competed at the 2009 World Championships, but she fell and did not advance past 1500 metres heats. She came fifth at the 2010 IAAF World Indoor Championships with a personal best run of 4:09.57 minutes. She improved upon this with a run of 4:07.45 minutes for third place at the Sparkassen Cup in February 2011.
