= List of winners of the Cape Town Marathon =

The Cape Town Marathon is an annual marathon held in Cape Town, South Africa. The following tables list winners of the elite marathon and wheelchair races. The main elite marathon winners tables begin with the modern race from 2007 onward. Sourced earlier winners are listed separately.

== Earlier editions ==
The Cape Town Marathon traces its history to 1994. The event's official history identifies Julian Paul and Evelina Tshabalala as the inaugural men's and women's winners, and Soulman Nakedi and Esme Koopman as the 1995 winners.

Year	Men's winner	Nationality	Time (h:m:s)	Women's winner	Nationality	Time (h:m:s)	Notes
1994	Julian Paul	South Africa	2:26:45	Evelina Tshabalala	South Africa	2:55:49	Inaugural edition
1995	Soulman Nakedi	South Africa	2:20:30	Esme Koopman	South Africa	2:48:46	

== Elite race – men's winners ==
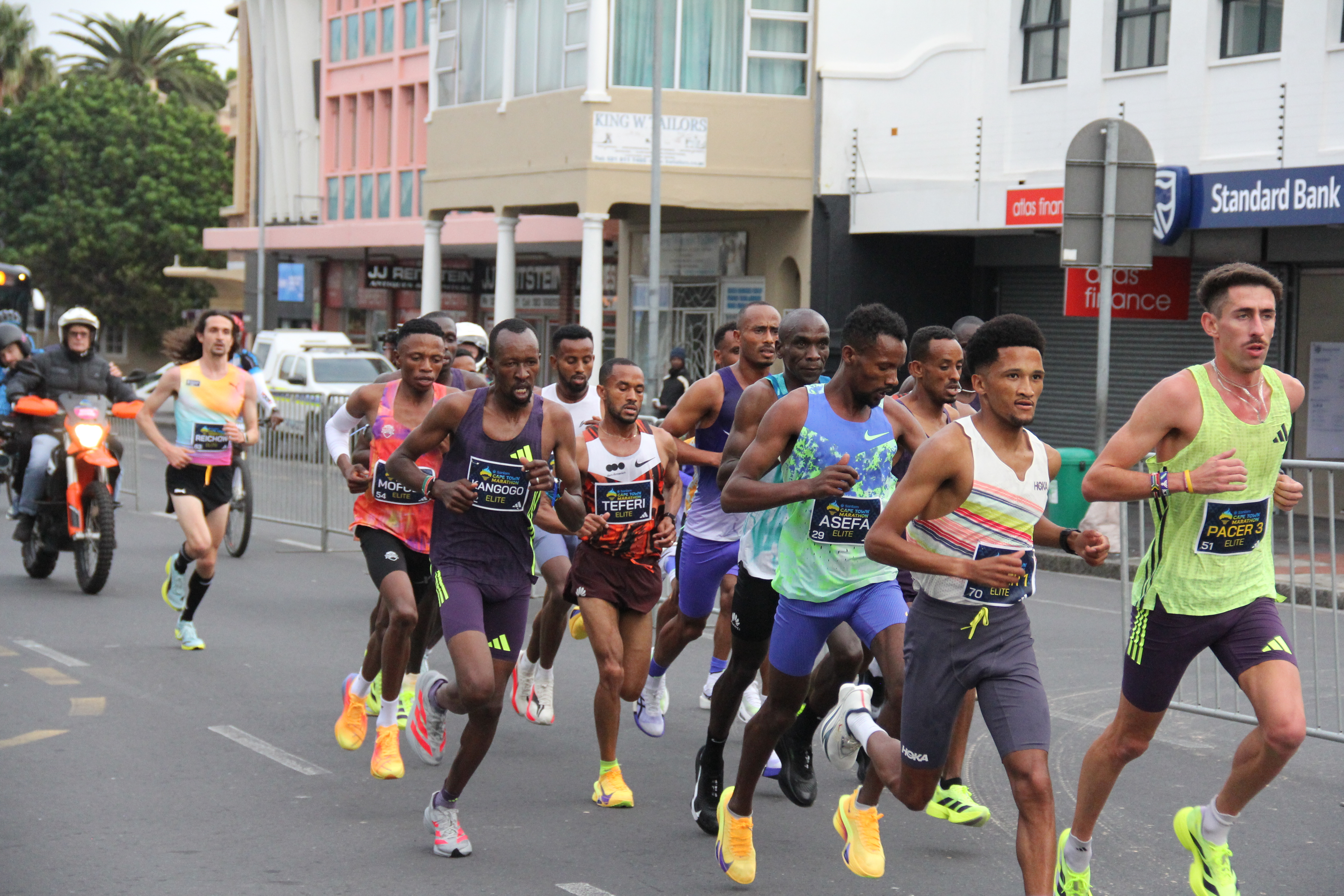
2026 Cape Town Marathon

Year	Athlete	Nationality	Time (h:m:s)	Notes
2007	Mluleki Nobanda	South Africa	2:14:46	
2008	Motlokoa Nkhabutlane	Lesotho	2:14:16	
2009	George Mofokeng	South Africa	2:14:20	
2010	Gert Thys	South Africa	2:22:12	
2011	Amos Maiyo	Kenya	2:14:55	
2012	Gilbert Mutandiro	Zimbabwe	2:19:16	
2013	Paul Manawa	Kenya	2:17:51	Manawa had initially placed second, but was elevated after the original winner, Lindikhaya Mthangayi, was disqualified for a doping offence.
2014	Willy Kibor	Kenya	2:10:41	
2015	Shadrack Kemboi	Kenya	2:11:41	
2016	Asefa Mengstu	Ethiopia	2:08:41	Course record
2017	Asefa Mengstu	Ethiopia	2:10:01	Second victory
2018	Stephen Mokoka	South Africa	2:08:31	Course record
2019	Edwin Koech	Kenya	2:09:20	
2020	Cancelled due to the COVID-19 pandemic			
2021	Stephen Mokoka	South Africa	2:10:01	Second victory
2022	Stephen Mokoka	South Africa	2:09:58	Third victory
2023	Adane Kebede Gebre	Ethiopia	2:11:29	
2024	Abdisa Tola	Ethiopia	2:08:15	Course record
2025	Cancelled on race day because of safety concerns caused by severe winds			
2026	Mohamed Esa	Ethiopia	2:04:55	Course record

== Elite race – women's winners ==
Year	Athlete	Nationality	Time (h:m:s)	Notes
2007	Samukeliso Moyo	Zimbabwe	2:41:30	
2008	Samukeliso Moyo	Zimbabwe	2:42:12	Second victory
2009	Sharon Tavengwa	Zimbabwe	2:47:08	
2010	Nomvuyisi Seti	South Africa	2:57:12	
2011	Chiyedza Chokore	Zimbabwe	2:46:31	
2012	Alicen Manake	Zimbabwe	2:51:37	
2013	Samukeliso Moyo	Zimbabwe	2:42:46	Third victory
2014	Meseret Mengistu	Ethiopia	2:30:56	
2015	Isabella Ochichi	Kenya	2:30:20	
2016	Tish Jones	United Kingdom	2:36:13	
2017	Betelhem Moges	Ethiopia	2:30:22	
2018	Helalia Johannes	Namibia	2:29:28	
2019	Celestine Chepchirchir	Kenya	2:26:44	Course record
2020	Cancelled due to the COVID-19 pandemic			
2021	Lydia Simiyu	Kenya	2:25:44	Course record
2022	Meseret Dinke Meleka	Ethiopia	2:24:02	Course record
2023	Tsige Haileslase Abreha	Ethiopia	2:24:17	
2024	Glenrose Xaba	South Africa	2:22:22	Course record; South African record
2025	Cancelled on race day because of safety concerns caused by severe winds			
2026	Dera Dida	Ethiopia	2:23:18	

== Wheelchair race – men's winners ==
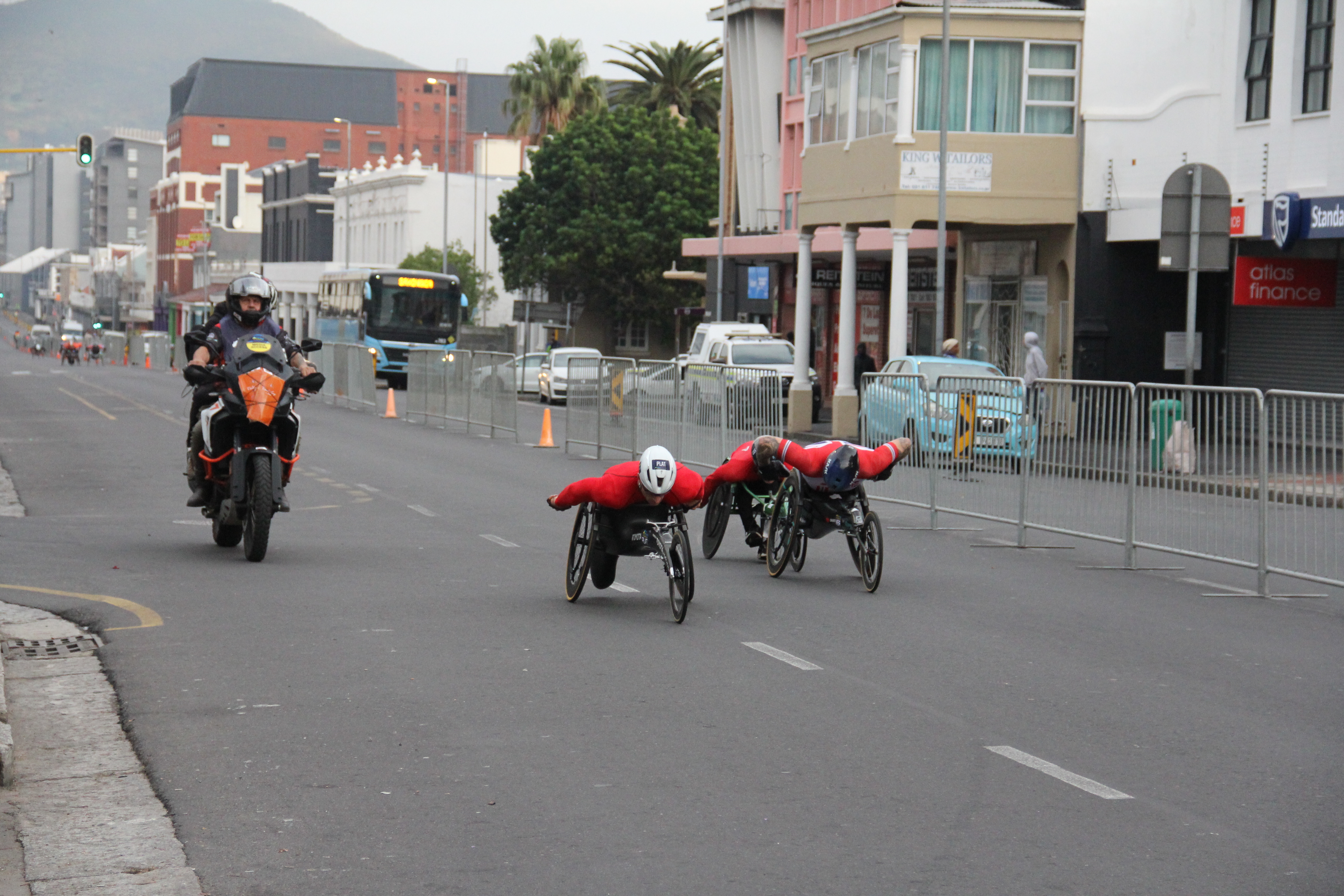
2026 Cape Town Marathon

The Cape Town Marathon introduced an elite wheelchair marathon in 2022.

Year	Athlete	Nationality	Time (h:m:s)	Notes
2022	Aaron Pike	United States	1:40:15	Inaugural elite wheelchair race
2023	Geert Schipper	Netherlands	1:32:09	Course record
2024	Sho Watanabe	Japan	1:37:33	
2025	Cancelled on race day because of safety concerns caused by severe winds			
2026	David Weir	United Kingdom	1:30:20	Course record

== Wheelchair race – women's winners ==
Year	Athlete	Nationality	Time (h:m:s)	Notes
2022	Vanessa de Souza	Brazil	1:57:48	Inaugural elite wheelchair race
2023	Eden Rainbow-Cooper	United Kingdom	1:52:58	Course record
2024	Michelle Wheeler	United States	2:03:22	
2025	Cancelled on race day because of safety concerns caused by severe winds			
2026	Manuela Schär	Switzerland	1:43:25	Course record

== Multiple wins ==
Men's elite race
Athlete	Wins	Years
Stephen Mokoka (RSA)	3	2018, 2021, 2022
Asefa Mengstu (ETH)	2	2016, 2017

Women's elite race
Athlete	Wins	Years
Samukeliso Moyo (ZIM)	3	2007, 2008, 2013

== Victories by nationality ==
The following table counts winners listed in the main elite race tables from 2007 onward and the wheelchair race tables from 2022 onward. It does not include the partial earlier-editions table.

Country	Men's race	Women's race	Men's wheelchair	Women's wheelchair	Total
Ethiopia	5	6	0	0	11
Kenya	5	3	0	0	8
South Africa	6	2	0	0	8
Zimbabwe	1	6	0	0	7
United Kingdom	0	1	1	1	3
United States	0	0	1	1	2
Brazil	0	0	0	1	1
Japan	0	0	1	0	1
Lesotho	1	0	0	0	1
Namibia	0	1	0	0	1
Netherlands	0	0	1	0	1
Switzerland	0	0	0	1	1
