= Azusa Nojiri =

Japanese long-distance runner (born 1982)

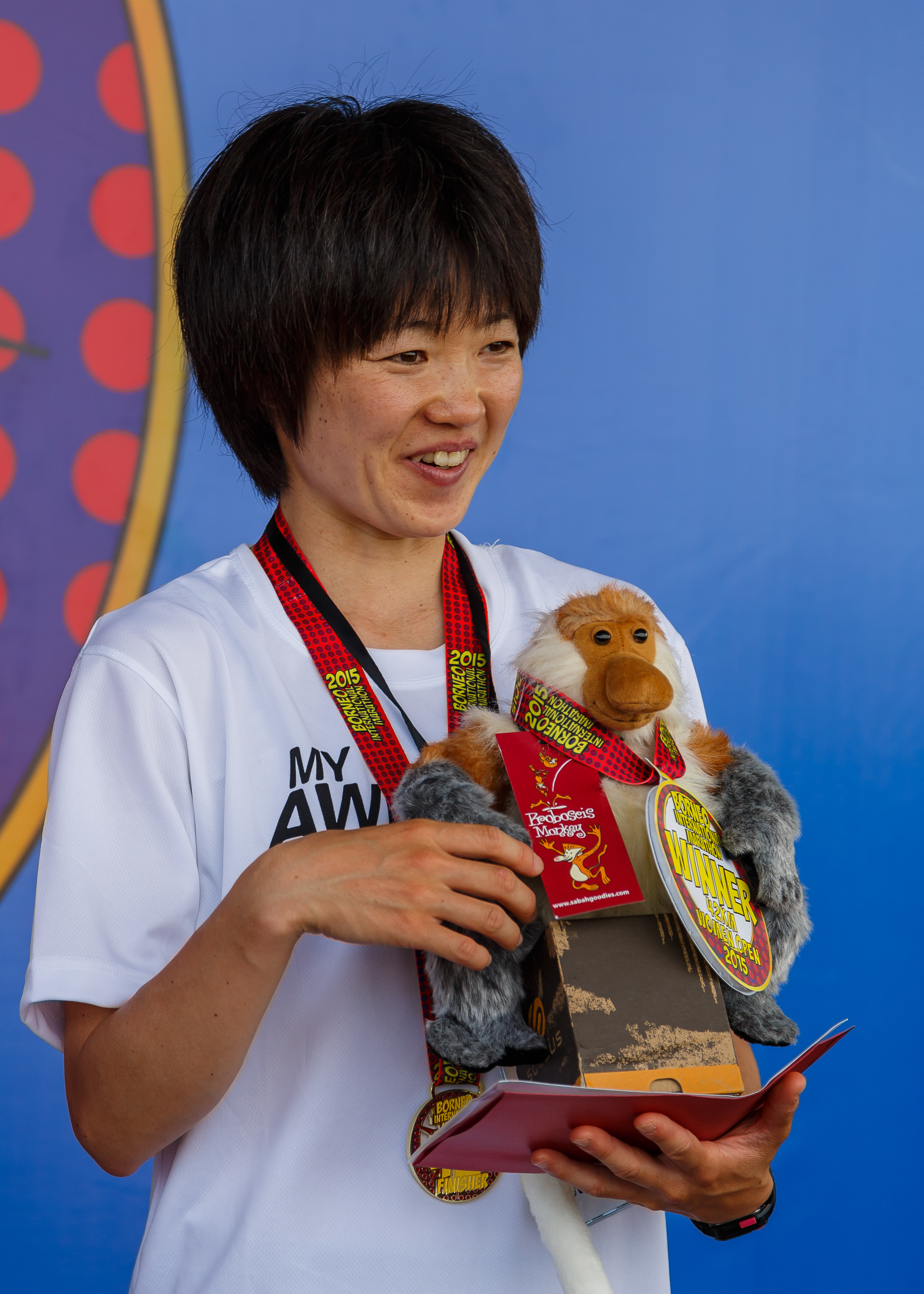
- Nojiri, after excelling 1st in Borneo International Marathon

Personal information
- Born: 6 June 1982 (age 44) Toyama Prefecture, Japan
- Height: 1.56 m (5 ft 1 in)
- Weight: 43 kg (95 lb)

Sport
- Country: Japan
- Sport: Athletics
- Event: Long-distance running

Achievements and titles
- Personal best: Marathon: 2:24:57 (2012)
- Updated on 30 November 2013

Azusa Nojiri (野尻 あずさ, Nojiri Azusa; born 6 June 1982) is a Japanese long-distance runner who competes in marathon races. Her personal best for the distance is 2:24:57 hours. She represented Japan in the marathon at the 2011 World Championships in Athletics, coming in 19th.

Originally a cross-country skier, she participated at the 2005 Winter Universiade but switched to distance running instead. She competed at the 2010 IAAF World Half Marathon Championships and shared in the team bronze medal. She formerly ran for the Dai-Ichi Life corporate team and won the ekiden corporate title with them in 2011.

== Career ==
=== Early career ===
Born in Toyama Prefecture, Nojiri started her sporting career as a cross-country skier. Her first international races came at the 2005 Winter Universiade, where she was 21st in the 15 km classic and 35th in the 5 km free race. She pursued an Olympic berth in the sport, but at age 25 she re-considered her options and instead aimed to try her Olympic chances in marathon running.

She began competing in half marathons in her mid-twenties and won the 2008 Hakodate Half Marathon in a time of 74:12 minutes. Nojiri signed up with the Dai-ichi Life corporate running team around this time. The following year she improved to 70:53 minutes, taking tenth place at the All Japan Corporate Team Half Marathon Championships in the process, and also finishing eighth at the Sapporo Half Marathon (having led early on). She helped her team to third in the rankings at the end-of-year All-Japan Women's Corporate Ekiden Championships.

=== First marathons ===
Her first marathon race came at the beginning of 2010, when she entered the Osaka Women's Marathon. She was close to the leaders in the first part of the race and eventually finished in 2:29:12 hours in eighth position. Under the tutelage of Sachiko Yamashita, she continued to progress and was a close second to Yuri Kano at the Sapporo Half Marathon. This performance earned her an international debut at the 2010 IAAF World Half Marathon Championships and her thirteenth-place finish at that event helped the Japanese team, including Yoshimi Ozaki and Ryoko Kizaki, take the team bronze medals. She returned for Dai-Ichi Life at the Corporate Ekiden Championships and placed second in her stage behind Risa Shigetomo of Tenmaya – an outcome matched in the final team rankings.

The 2011 Tōhoku earthquake and tsunami affected her preparations that year as the Nagoya Women's Marathon was cancelled. The race was to be used to select the national team, but Nojiri and several other Japanese were allowed as late additions to the 2011 London Marathon instead. In an extremely competitive field she came twelfth in a time of 2:25:29 hours. She was the second placed Japanese runner (after Yukiko Akaba) and her run was the fastest ever recorded for such a placing in a marathon. This gained Nojiri her first international selection for the marathon. At the 2011 World Championships in Athletics, held in Daegu, she crossed the line in 19th place and was part of the fourth-placed Japanese team for the 2011 IAAF World Marathon Cup. That year's Corporate Ekiden Championships was held in Sendai – an area affected by the earthquake but sufficiently cleaned up to hold the event. Nojiri ran the second to last leg and, having preserved the lead for Dai-Ichi Life, helped the team to the corporate title.

=== Missed Olympics ===
In her first race of 2012 she gave a varying performance in Osaka. She was down the order at the start of the race, then resurged in the second half of the race to lift herself into the runner-up spot, but again slowed in the final stages and ended up third behind Risa Shigetomo and Tetyana Gamera-Shmyrko. In spite of this her time of 2:24:57 hours was a new personal best. This was not enough for a place on the Japanese Olympic team and in response to her exclusion she left her running team and skipped competition for the rest of the year, looking to find a way to improve her running further.

Upon her return the following year, she appeared to be out of form at the 2013 Tokyo Marathon, coming ninth in a time of 2:31:15 hours. A trip to the Czech Republic was similarly underwhelming as she came tenth in the Prague Half Marathon and the Prague Marathon (running 2:40:59 hours at the latter race – easily the worst outing of her career). The Yokohama Women's Marathon in November saw an improvement as she led for a large portion of the race before being overhauled at the 30 km mark by eventual winner Albina Mayorova – although Nojiri took second in 2:28:47 hours, she vowed to improve the end part of her race to be competitive with foreign runners.

== International competition record ==
Year	Competition	Venue	Position	Event	Notes
2005	Winter Universiade	Innsbruck, Austria	21st	15 km classic ski	
2005	Winter Universiade	Innsbruck, Austria	35th	5 km free ski	
2010	World Half Marathon Championships	Nanning, China	13th	Half marathon	1:11:35
2010	World Half Marathon Championships	Nanning, China	3rd	Team race	3:33:40
2011	World Championships	Daegu, South Korea	19th	Marathon	2:33:42
2015	Borneo International Marathon	Kota Kinabalu, Malaysia	1st	Full Marathon, Woman Open	3:00:04
2017	Borneo International Marathon	Kota Kinabalu, Malaysia	1st	Full Marathon, Woman Open	3:02:50

== Personal bests ==
- Half marathon – 1:10:53 (2009)
- Marathon – 2:24:57 (2012)
