= 2026 Cape Town Marathon =

2026 edition of the Cape Town Marathon

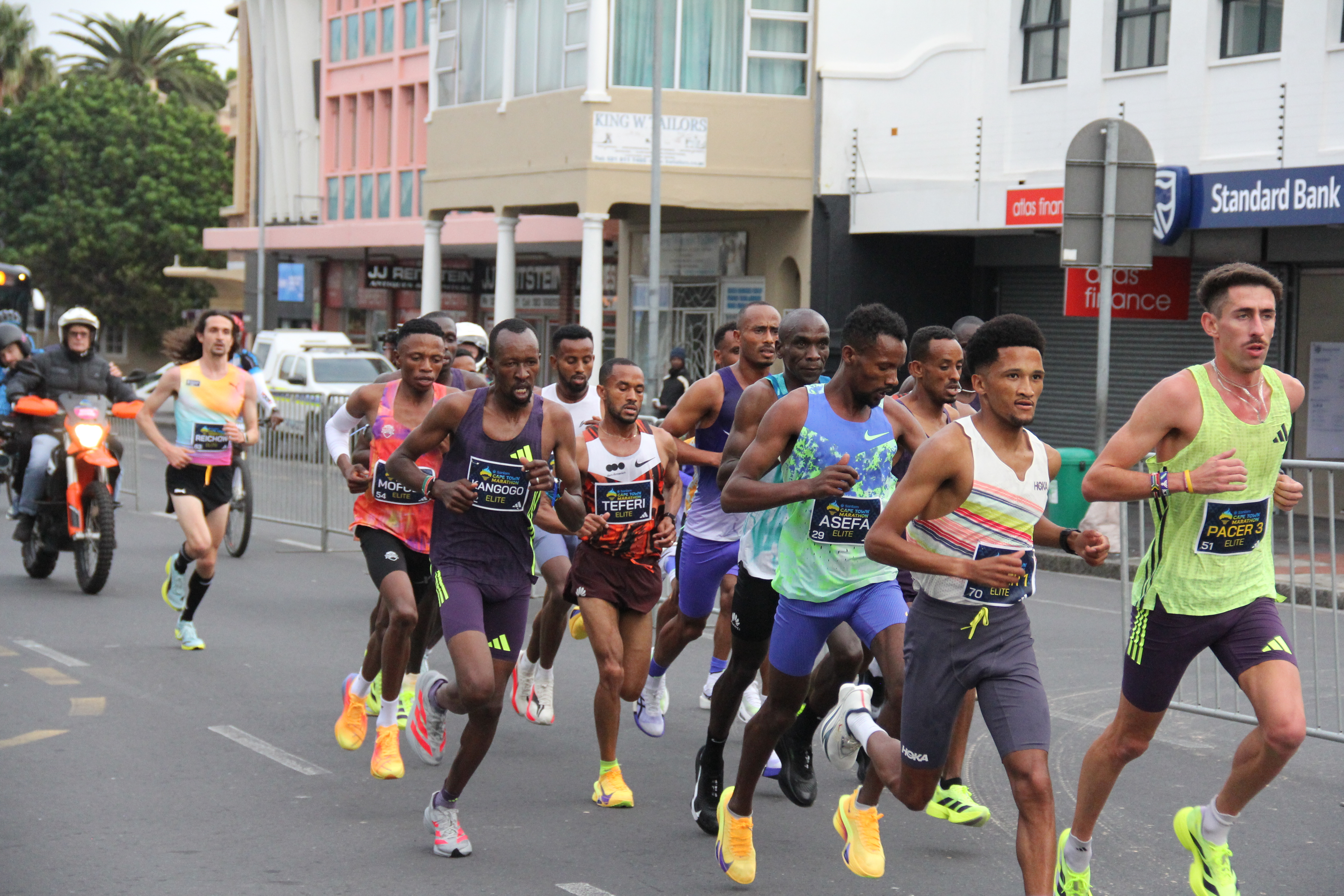
- Runners on Victoria Road during the 2026 Cape Town Marathon
- Venue: Cape Town, South Africa
- Date: 24 May 2026

Champions
- Men: Mohamed Esa (2:04:55)
- Women: Dera Dida Yami (2:23:18)
- Wheelchair men: David Weir (1:30:20)
- Wheelchair women: Manuela Schär (1:43:25)

The 2026 Cape Town Marathon (Note: Known as the 2026 Sanlam Cape Town Marathon for sponsorship reasons.) was the 32nd edition of the Cape Town Marathon, an annual marathon held in Cape Town, South Africa. The race was held during the final phase of the event's candidacy for admission to the Abbott World Marathon Majors, after the 2025 edition had been cancelled because of severe winds.

The men's race was won by Ethiopia's Mohamed Esa in 2:04:55, the fastest marathon time recorded on African soil. Ethiopia's Dera Dida Yami won the women's race in 2:23:18. The men's course record and both wheelchair course records were broken during the event.

== Background ==
The 2026 race took place during the final phase of the Cape Town Marathon's candidacy for admission to the Abbott World Marathon Majors. The race had passed the first stage of the assessment process after the 2024 edition, and the 2025 edition was expected to form part of the second stage of evaluation.

The 2025 marathon was cancelled on race day after severe winds damaged event infrastructure and created safety concerns. The cancellation delayed the race's opportunity to complete the next phase of the Abbott World Marathon Majors assessment process.

Abbott World Marathon Majors confirmed that finishers of the 2026 Cape Town Marathon would receive a provisional AbbottWMM star. The organisation said the provisional stars would be fully recognised if Cape Town achieved its second evaluation pass in 2026. The 2026 event was also scheduled to host the AbbottWMM Marathon Tours & Travel Age Group World Championships.

The 2026 event weekend included 27,000 marathon runners and 17,500 participants across associated road and trail events, including the 10 km and 5 km Peace Runs and the Cape Town Trail Marathon events, for a combined field of 44,500. The 10 km Peace Run sold out its 11,500 entries, while about 4,500 participants took part in the 5 km Peace Run.

== Elite races ==
The elite marathon races were held on Sunday, 24 May. On the eve of the marathon, organisers described the men's field as the fastest assembled for a marathon on African soil, with course records, South African records and African all-comers records expected to be challenged.

=== Men ===
The men's elite field included Eliud Kipchoge, the two-time Olympic marathon champion and former marathon world record holder. The Cape Town race was his first marathon on African soil and marked the start of his project to run a marathon on each of the seven continents over a two-year period.

Mohamed Esa of Ethiopia won the men's race in 2:04:55, breaking the Cape Town Marathon course record and recording the fastest marathon time on African soil. Ethiopia's Yihunilign Adane finished second in 2:04:59, and Kenya's Kalipus Lomwai finished third in 2:05:06. Kipchoge finished 16th in 2:13:29.

=== Women ===
Dera Dida Yami of Ethiopia won the women's race in 2:23:18. Mestawut Fikir finished second in 2:23:46, and Waganesh Amare finished third in 2:23:57, completing an Ethiopian sweep of the women's podium.

=== Wheelchair races ===
David Weir of Great Britain won the men's wheelchair race in 1:30:20, setting a course record. Jetze Plat of the Netherlands finished second in 1:33:12, with Sho Watanabe of Japan and Zhang Ying of China both awarded bronze after finishing in 1:33:43.

Manuela Schär of Switzerland won the women's wheelchair race in 1:43:25, also setting a course record. Chen Xiaochun and Deng Yirun, both of China, finished second and third respectively.

=== Other races ===
In the 10 km Peace Run, South Africa's Maxime Chaumeton won the men's race in a course record 27:42, ahead of Thapelo Ramokhoase and Cwenga Nose. Tayla Kavanagh won the women's race for the third consecutive year, setting a course record of 31:25. Kyla Jacobs finished second and Lesotho's Neheng Khatala finished third.

In the 5 km Peace Run, Spain's Iker Ortega Castro was the first man across the line, while South Africa's Carmen Kensley was the first woman home.

The Cape Town Trail Marathon events were held on Saturday, 23 May, over routes through and around Table Mountain National Park. In the 43 km Cape Town Trail Marathon, Philani Sengce won the men's race for the second consecutive year in 3:48:03, breaking his own course record. Maryke van Zyl won the women's race in 5:04:58, ahead of Simone Malan and Ashleigh Graham.

In the 22 km trail race, Remaketse Lekaka won the men's race in 1:41:59 and Bianca Tarboton won the women's race in 1:48:26. In the 11 km trail race, Liam Matthews won the men's race and Heidi de Jager won the women's race.

== Results ==
=== Men ===
Position	Name	Country	Time
1st place, gold medalist(s)	Mohamed Esa	Ethiopia	2:04:55
2nd place, silver medalist(s)	Yihunilign Adane	Ethiopia	2:04:59
3rd place, bronze medalist(s)	Kalipus Lomwai	Kenya	2:05:06
4	Leonard Langat	Kenya	2:05:26
5	Jemal Yimer	Ethiopia	2:05:48
6	Mulugeta Uma	Ethiopia	2:06:19
7	Maru Teferi	Israel	2:06:46
8	Abebaw Dessie Muniye	Ethiopia	2:06:57
9	Benard Kipkurui Biwott	Kenya	2:07:34
10	Justus Kipkogei Kangogo	Kenya	2:07:42

=== Women ===
Position	Name	Country	Time
1st place, gold medalist(s)	Dera Dida Yami	Ethiopia	2:23:18
2nd place, silver medalist(s)	Mestawut Fikir	Ethiopia	2:23:46
3rd place, bronze medalist(s)	Waganesh Amare	Ethiopia	2:23:57
4	Leah Cheruto	Kenya	2:24:31
5	Edna Kiplagat	Kenya	2:25:44
6	Gojjam Enyew	Ethiopia	2:26:24
7	Mercy Jerop Kwambai	Kenya	2:30:36
8	Desi Jisa Mokonin	Brunei	2:30:44
9	Cynthia Jerotich Limo	Kenya	2:32:00
10	Salmi Nduviteko	Namibia	2:33:23

=== Wheelchair men ===
Position	Name	Country	Time
1st place, gold medalist(s)	David Weir	United Kingdom	1:30:20
2nd place, silver medalist(s)	Jetze Plat	Netherlands	1:33:12
3rd place, bronze medalist(s)	Sho Watanabe	Japan	1:33:43
3rd place, bronze medalist(s)	Zhang Ying	China	1:33:43
5	Geert Schipper	Netherlands	1:33:45
6	Aaron Pike	United States	1:35:57
7	Ma Zhuo	China	1:40:15
8	Kota Hokinoue	Japan	1:40:39
9	Hiroki Nishida	Japan	1:41:07
10	Brian Siemann	United States	1:52:57

=== Wheelchair women ===
Position	Name	Country	Time
1st place, gold medalist(s)	Manuela Schär	Switzerland	1:43:25
2nd place, silver medalist(s)	Chen Xiaochun	China	1:52:21
3rd place, bronze medalist(s)	Deng Yirun	China	1:57:05
4	Christie Dawes	Australia	1:58:46
5	Zhang Yuan	China	2:12:27
6	Hannah Babalola	Nigeria	2:12:27
7	Yeni Hernandez	Mexico	2:16:31
8	Rita Cuccuru	Italy	2:36:18

=== Other races ===
==== 10 km Peace Run ====
Men
Position	Name	Country	Time
1st place, gold medalist(s)	Maxime Chaumeton	South Africa	27:42
2nd place, silver medalist(s)	Thapelo Ramokhoase	South Africa	28:34
3rd place, bronze medalist(s)	Cwenga Nose	South Africa	29:00
4	Arthur Jantjies	South Africa	29:19
5	Luan Munnik	South Africa	29:23

Women
Position	Name	Country	Time
1st place, gold medalist(s)	Tayla Kavanagh	South Africa	31:26
2nd place, silver medalist(s)	Kyla Jacobs	South Africa	32:48
3rd place, bronze medalist(s)	Neheng Khatala	Lesotho	33:02
4	Cacisile Sosibo	South Africa	33:03
5	Carina Viljoen	South Africa	33:25

==== 5 km Peace Run ====
Men
Position	Name	Country	Time
1st place, gold medalist(s)	Iker Ortega Castro	Spain	17:14
2nd place, silver medalist(s)	Jiunhung Chen	Chinese Taipei	17:28
3rd place, bronze medalist(s)	Mark Milde	Germany	17:30

Women
Position	Name	Country	Time
1st place, gold medalist(s)	Carmen Kensley	South Africa	17:53
2nd place, silver medalist(s)	Michelle Geldenhuys	South Africa	18:07
3rd place, bronze medalist(s)	Emma Winter	United Kingdom	18:12

==== Cape Town Trail Marathon 43 km ====
Men
Position	Name	Country	Time
1st place, gold medalist(s)	Philani Sengce	South Africa	3:48:03
2nd place, silver medalist(s)	Simon Ngumbau	Kenya	3:55:24
3rd place, bronze medalist(s)	Kyle Bucklow	South Africa	3:59:50
4	Isaya Kiriago	Kenya	4:08:46
5	Dennis Kiyaka	Kenya	4:11:04

Women
Position	Name	Country	Time
1st place, gold medalist(s)	Maryke van Zyl	South Africa	5:04:58
2nd place, silver medalist(s)	Simone Malan	South Africa	5:13:32
3rd place, bronze medalist(s)	Ashleigh Graham	South Africa	5:14:31
4	Jessie Waldman	United Kingdom	5:24:18
5	Chare Calitz	South Africa	5:43:33

==== Cape Town Trail 22 km ====
Men
Position	Name	Country	Time
1st place, gold medalist(s)	Remaketse Lekaka	South Africa	1:41:59
2nd place, silver medalist(s)	Giovanni Bianco	Italy	1:43:08
3rd place, bronze medalist(s)	Riaan Wildschutt	South Africa	1:43:28
4	Wano Katjiri	South Africa	1:48:05
5	Melihaya Msizi	South Africa	1:50:51

Women
Position	Name	Country	Time
1st place, gold medalist(s)	Bianca Tarboton	South Africa	1:48:26
2nd place, silver medalist(s)	Ebeth Marais	South Africa	1:56:35
3rd place, bronze medalist(s)	Louise Dippenaar	South Africa	2:03:48
4	Megan Launder	South Africa	2:35:31
5	Stephanie Warren	Canada	2:37:21

==== Cape Town Trail 11 km ====
Men
Position	Name	Country	Time
1st place, gold medalist(s)	Liam Matthews	South Africa	51:29
2nd place, silver medalist(s)	Siyabonga Chabalala	South Africa	54:04
3rd place, bronze medalist(s)	Michael de Kwaadsteniet	South Africa	57:11

Women
Position	Name	Country	Time
1st place, gold medalist(s)	Heidi de Jager	South Africa	1:01:27
2nd place, silver medalist(s)	Mineé van den Berg	South Africa	1:01:37
3rd place, bronze medalist(s)	Olga Antoniceva	Latvia	1:02:49
