= Asefa =

Asefa is an Ethiopian name, in which tradition it can be either given name or patronymic. Notable people with the name include:

- Manamto Asefa, Israeli footballer
- Asefa Mengstu, Ethiopian long-distance runner
- Sutume Asefa Kebede, Ethiopian long-distance runner
