= Dire Tune =

Ethiopian long-distance runner (born 1985)

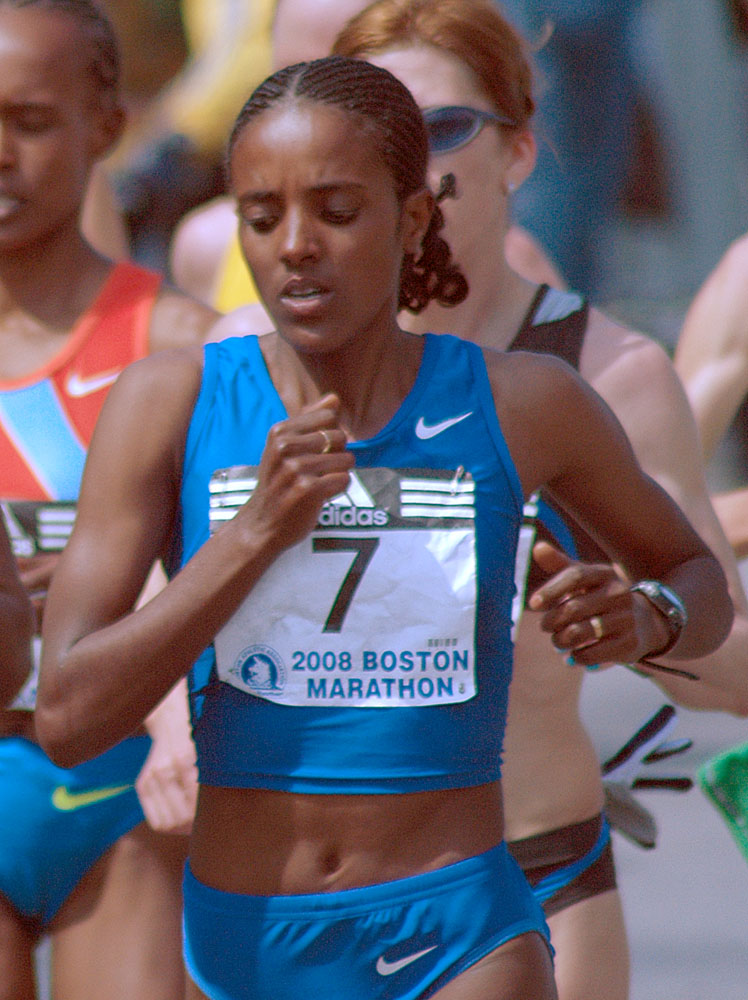
- Tune at the 2008 Boston Marathon

Personal information
- National team: Ethiopia
- Born: 19 June 1985 (age 41)
- Relative: Leila Aman (sister-in-law)

Sport
- Sport: Athletics
- Event: Long-distance running

Achievements and titles
- Olympic finals: 2008; Marathon, 15th
- World finals: 2005; Marathon, 37th 2007; Marathon, DNF; 2009; Marathon, 22nd 2011; Marathon, DNF
Medal record
Women's athletics
Representing the Ethiopia
World Championships
Silver medal – second place	2010 Nanning	Half-marathon
World Marathon Majors
Gold medal – first place	2008 Boston	Marathon
Silver medal – second place	2009 Boston	Marathon

Dire Tune Arissi (/ˈdɪəreɪ ˈtuːneɪ/ DEER-ay TOO-nay; born 19 June 1985) is an Ethiopian professional long-distance runner.

Tune competed in the marathon at the 2005 World Championships. At the 2006 World Road Running Championships she finished fourth in the individual competition. This was good enough to help Ethiopia win a silver medal in the team competition.

On April 21, 2008, Tune won the Boston Marathon with a time of 2:25:25. She was then selected to represent her country in the marathon at the 2008 Summer Olympics, and was the only Ethiopian to finish, placing 15th in a time of 2:31:16. In April 2009, Tune finished second by one second in the Boston Marathon with a time of 2:32:17. After finishing the race, she collapsed and had to be taken to the hospital. Her agent said the problem was due in part to dehydration combined with the cool weather and the fact that she trained for a shorter race.

Dire Tune held the One Hour running world record with 18.517 kilometres set June 12, 2008 in Ostrava until it was broken in 2020 by Sifan Hassan in Brussels. The previous record (18,340 m) was set by Tegla Loroupe ten years earlier.

Tune won the 2009 Ras Al Khaimah Half Marathon, setting the Ethiopian half marathon record of 1:07:18. The previous national record (1:08:07) was set by Bezunesh Bekele in 2007 in Udine.

She won the 2010 Ottawa 10K race in 32:11 in late May, becoming the first woman to finish ahead of the men's winner in the mixed gender race where the men's section begins four minutes after the women. She ran at the Bogota Half Marathon in August and finished as runner-up, some six seconds behind winner Shewarge Amare. The Frankfurt Marathon followed in November and she improve her personal best by almost a minute, running 2:23:44 for the runner-up spot behind Caroline Kilel.

She started the 2011 season with a win at the Ethiopian 15K Championships, beating Atsede Habtamu at the line. She ran at the Ras Al Khaimah Half Marathon a few days later and was the runner-up, albeit some minutes behind a world record-breaking Mary Keitany. She came close to winning the World's Best 10K race in Puerto Rico two weeks later, but was edged into second by Sentayehu Ejigu. She topped the podium at the World 10K Bangalore, pipping Merima Mohammed at the line. She ran the marathon at the 2011 World Championships in Athletics in Daegu, South Korea. Despite running the first 13 miles in the lead pack, she was disqualified after consuming a drink from an unknown person in the crowd, which is against IAAF rules.

== Personal bests ==
- 3000 metres - 9:02.08 min (2003)
- 5000 metres - 15:47.83 min (2003)
- Half marathon - 1:07:18 hrs (2009)
- Marathon - 2:23:44 hrs (2010)
- Hour run - 18.517 km (2008) WR

== Achievements ==
Year	Competition	Venue	Position	Event	Notes
Representing Ethiopia
2005	World Championships	Helsinki, Finland	37th	Marathon	2:39:13
2006	World Road Running Championships	Debrecen, Hungary	4th	20 km	1:05:16
2007	World Championships	Osaka, Japan	—	Marathon	DNF
2008	Boston Marathon	Boston, United States	1st	Marathon	2:25:25
2008	Olympic Games	Beijing, PR China	15th	Marathon	2:31:16
2009	World Championships	Berlin, Germany	23rd	Marathon	2:32:42
2011	World Championships	Daegu, South Korea	—	Marathon	DSQ
