= Fate Tola =

Ethiopian long-distance runner

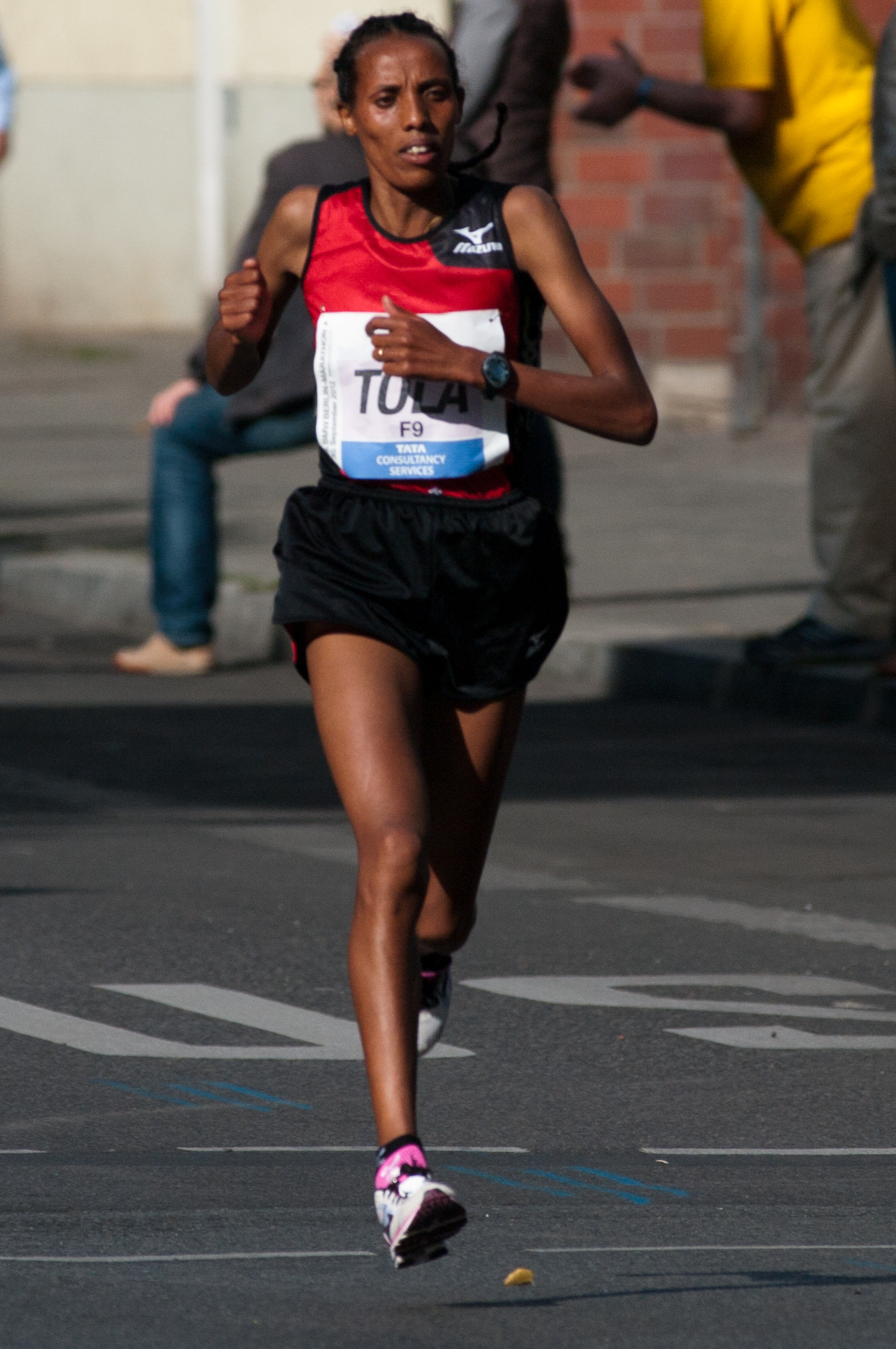
Fate Tola at the 2012 Berlin Marathon

Fate Tola Geleto (born 22 October 1987) is an Ethiopian long-distance runner who competes in marathon races. She represented Ethiopia at the IAAF World Half Marathon Championships and has won marathons in Thessaloniki and Vienna. She lives in Germany and trains with Irina Mikitenko. Since 2012, she competes for the German club MTV Braunschweig.

Among her first elite level appearances was the Great Ethiopian Run in November 2008, where she came fourth behind Teyba Erkesso over the 10 km distance. She made her professional marathon debut at the Alexander the Great Marathon in April 2009 and she won on her first attempt, taking the women's title in a time of 2:36:54 hours. The Ljubljana Marathon in October was her second outing over the distance and she was fourth, but improved her best time by a minute and a half.

She represented Oromia Police at the Sululta Cross Country at the start of 2010 and came fourth. She significantly improved her marathon best at that year's Rome City Marathon, taking fifth in a time of 2:28:54 hours, and won the Paderborner Osterlauf 10K soon afterwards. She was selected to represent Ethiopia at the 2010 IAAF World Half Marathon Championships in Nanning in October and she came seventh, setting a personal best of 1:09:38 hours for the distance. Her last major race of the year came at the Turin Marathon and she again improved: it became a two-woman race between Tola and Priscah Jeptoo and although it was her Kenyan rival who claimed victory, Tola ran a best of 2:28:22 hours as the runner-up.

Her 2011 season began with a second-place finish at the Berlin Half Marathon. This was her preparation for the Vienna City Marathon and in that race she defeated débutantes Peninah Arusei and Ana Dulce Felix to win with a fourth consecutive personal best of 2:26:21 hours. This streak came to an end at October's Frankfurt Marathon as her time of 2:27:18 hours brought her seventh place. She defended her Vienna Marathon title in 2012 and came close to her best with a run of 2:26:39 hours. A fifth place at the 2012 Berlin Marathon saw her improve that time to 2:25:14 hours.
