= Ryoko Kizaki =

Japanese long-distance runner (born 1985)

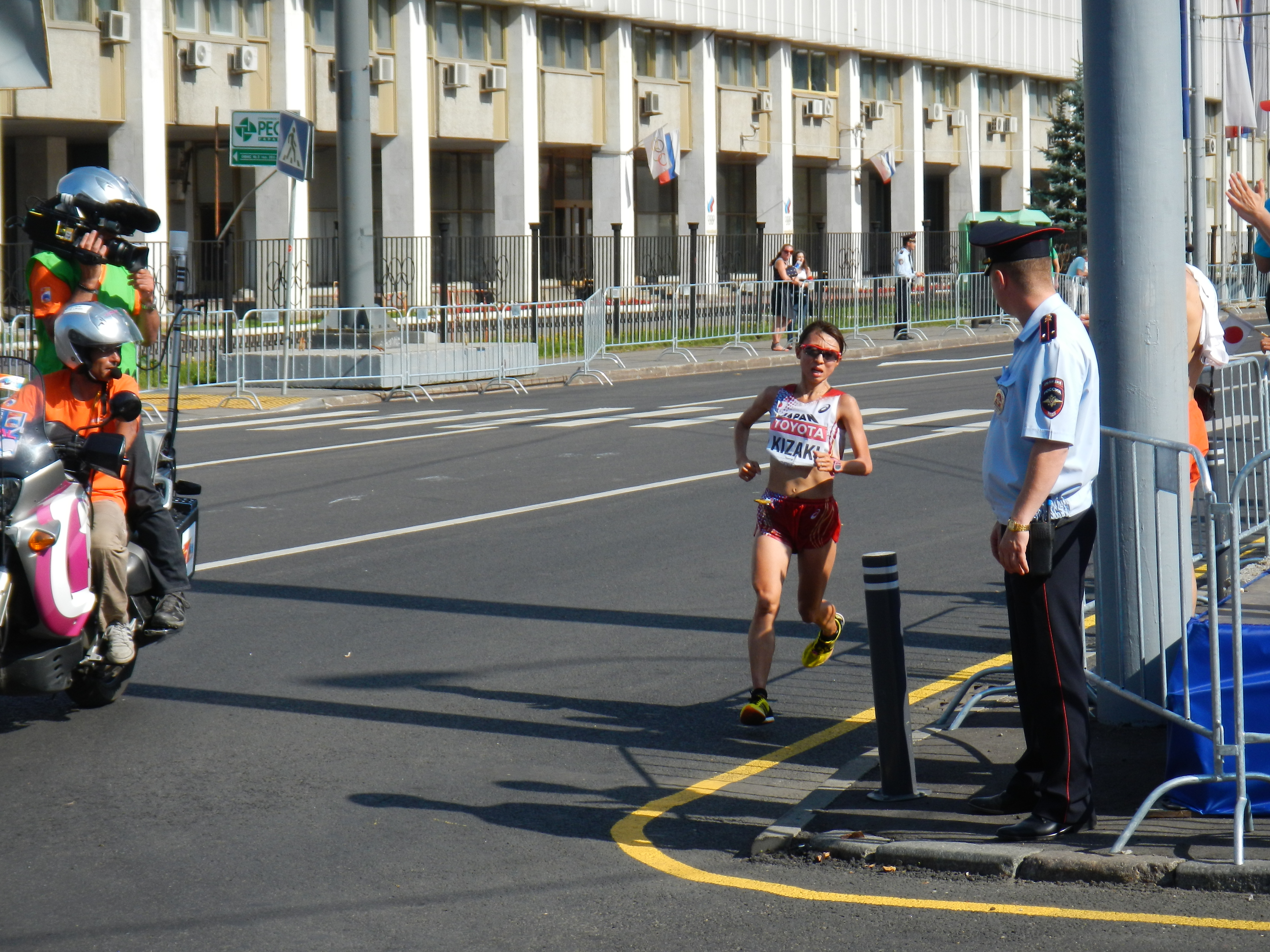
- Ryoko Kizaki during 2013 World Championships in Athletics – Women's Marathon in Moscow.

Personal information
- Born: June 21, 1985 (age 41) Kyoto, Japan
- Height: 1.57 m (5 ft 2 in)
- Weight: 43 kg (95 lb)

Sport
- Country: Japan
- Sport: Athletics
- Event: Marathon
Medal record
Summer Universiade
Silver medal – second place	2005 İzmir	Half marathon
Silver medal – second place	2007 Bangkok	10,000 m
World Half Marathon Championships
Bronze medal – third place	2010 Nanning	Team
Asian Games
Silver medal – second place	2014 Incheon	Marathon

Ryoko Kizaki (Japanese: 木崎 良子; born 21 June 1985) is a Japanese long-distance runner who competes in marathon and half marathon races. She won the 2011 Yokohama Women's Marathon in a personal best time of 2:26:32 hours. She is a three-time participant at the IAAF World Half Marathon Championships and a two-time medallist at the Summer Universiade.

== Career ==
Born in Kyoto, Kizaki attended the city's Miyazu High School before moving on to further study at Bukkyo University. While there, she competed for Japan at the Summer Universiade: she was the half marathon silver medallist at the 2005 event and won a second silver at the 2007 edition, where she set a personal best of 32:55.11 minutes in the 10,000 metres. She finished nineteenth at the 2006 World Road Running Championships, helping the Japanese team win the bronze medal in the team competition.

In 2008, she graduated from university and joined the Daihatsu corporate running team. The following year she came seventh in both the All-Japan Corporate Half Marathon Championships and the 10,000 m at the Japanese Athletics Championships. She went on to place thirteenth at the 2009 IAAF World Half Marathon Championships, although the Japanese women's team of Kizaki, Yurika Nakamura and Remi Nakazato were beaten out of the team medals by Russia.

Kizaki made her debut over the marathon distance (42.195 km) at the Osaka Ladies Marathon in January 2010. She finished in sixth place with a time of 2:27:34 hours, being the third Japanese to cross the line. At the Japanese track championships she was runner-up to Kayoko Fukushi in both the 5000 metres and 10,000 m events. As a result, she was chosen to represent Japan in the shorter event at the 2010 Asian Games in Guangzhou, where she took tenth place. She was also selected for the 2010 IAAF World Half Marathon Championships for a third time and had her best finish, coming in tenth place to take the team bronze for Japan with Yoshimi Ozaki and Azusa Nojiri.

In January 2011, she helped Kyoto to win the Inter-Prefectural Women's Ekiden and was fifth at the Osaka Marathon. The Yokohama Women's Marathon the following November saw her top the podium for the first time in the event. In spite of hot conditions and poor pacing, she ran a personal best of 2:26:32 hours and defeated her more favoured compatriot Yoshimi Ozaki. She won the first leg of the 2012 Inter-Prefectural Ekiden which opened a lead for the Osaka team to take the women's title. Her run in Yokohama gained her a spot for the 2012 Olympic Marathon, where she came sixteenth overall.

Kizaki improved her best by three minutes at the Nagoya Marathon in March 2013, running a time of 2:23:34 hours to win the race and another international selection.

== Personal bests ==
- 5000 metres - 15:35.12 min (2009)
- 10,000 metres - 32:16.40 min (2010)
- Half marathon - 1:10:16 hrs (2009)
- Marathon - 2:23:34 hrs (2013)
