= 2010 IAAF World Half Marathon Championships =

19th World Half Marathon Championships
- Host city: Nanning, Guangxi, China
- Nations: 30
- Athletes: 123
- Events: 2
- Dates: 16 October 2010
- Race length: 21.0975 km (13.1 mi)
- Individual prize money (US$): 1st: 30,000; 2nd: 15,000; 3rd: 10,000; 4th: 7,000; 5th: 5,000; 6th: 3,000
- Team prize money (US$): 1st: 15,000; 2nd: 12,000; 3rd: 9,000; 4th: 7,500; 5th: 6,000; 6th: 3,000

The 2010 IAAF World Half Marathon Championships was held in Nanning, China on 16 October 2010. The competition took place on the city streets, beginning and ending at Wuxiang Square, with a total prize purse of US$245,000 at stake.

The Kenyan athletes emerged with both the individual and team titles in the men's and women's races. Despite limited experience in top level half marathon races, Wilson Kiprop and Florence Kiplagat won their respective races. Kiprop broke Zersenay Tadese's winning streak which dated back to 2006, out-sprinting the defending champion in the final stages. Sammy Kitwara won the men's bronze medal and helped Kenya to the men's team title. Led by Zersenay, the Eritrean men beat Ethiopia to the team silver medal spot.

Kiplagat, who was ever present at the front of the women's race, outdid Ethiopian Dire Tune in the last kilometre to win her second gold medal on the global stage. Mirroring Kitwara, Kenya's women's bronze medallist Peninah Jerop Arusei secured the team's victory over Ethiopia. Representing the hosts, Zhu Xiaolin was the only non-African to reach the top eight at the championships. The joint effort of the Japanese women aided them to a sixth consecutive team bronze medal – making them the only medalling country outside the typically strong African triumvirate of Kenya, Ethiopia and Eritrea.

A total of 30 countries were represented at the 19th edition of the competition and 123 runners altogether were entered into the men's and women's races. The event was the final edition to be held on an annual schedule, as the competition switched to a biennial format for the 2012 championships.

== Organization ==
The city of Nanning was announced as the host venue for the 2010 World Half Marathon Championship at the IAAF Council Meeting in Monaco in November 2008. The winning bid was a continuation of a series of major international athletics events in the People's Republic of China, which included the 2006 World Junior Championships and a highly successful athletics competition at the 2008 Beijing Olympics. It was the first time that China hosted the competition, becoming the second Asian country to do so after India, which held the 2004 edition in New Delhi.

The Local Organizing Committee was headed by the Nanning Sports Bureau and worked in conjunction with the Chinese Athletics Association and the IAAF. The event gained a high-profile title sponsor in Sinopec, the major Chinese state-owned petroleum corporation. The competition featured an original event mascot – an anthropomorphic ox, called "Ah Niu", which was dressed in the traditional costume of the Zhuang people.

In addition to the primary events of the day, the competition was held in conjunction with Nanning's 28th Liberation Day celebrations and mass races over 10 km and 4 km were also held. The Chinese state broadcaster CCTV showed live television coverage of the event via helicopter.

== Format ==
Continuing in the tradition of previous editions, the championships comprised separate half marathon road races for men and women, with each race having an individual and international team aspect. Each nation could enter a maximum of five athletes per race and the team scores were calculated by combining the finishing times of each team's top three runners. Nations with fewer than three runners were disregarded for the team event and their runners competed for the individual prizes only.

Athletes typically gained selection for their country in one of two ways: through recent performances on the international road running circuit, or via a performance at a specially designated half marathon national championships.

A total prize money pot of US$245,000 was available to athletes at the championships, with awards being given to those placing from first to sixth in both the individual and team sections. The amounts on offer for each competition were equal across the sexes. The top prize for the individual race winners was $30,000, while the three athletes in the winning teams earned a share of $15,000. A further $50,000 was provided as an incentive for runners who improved upon the half marathon world record mark, but ultimately this award was not claimed at the 2010 championships. All athletes receiving prize money needed to submit to – and pass – a doping test in order to claim their award.

Prize money (US$)
	1st	2nd	3rd	4th	5th	6th
Individual race	30,000	15,000	10,000	7,000	5,000	3,000
Team race	15,000	12,000	9,000	7,500	6,000	3,000

== Course ==
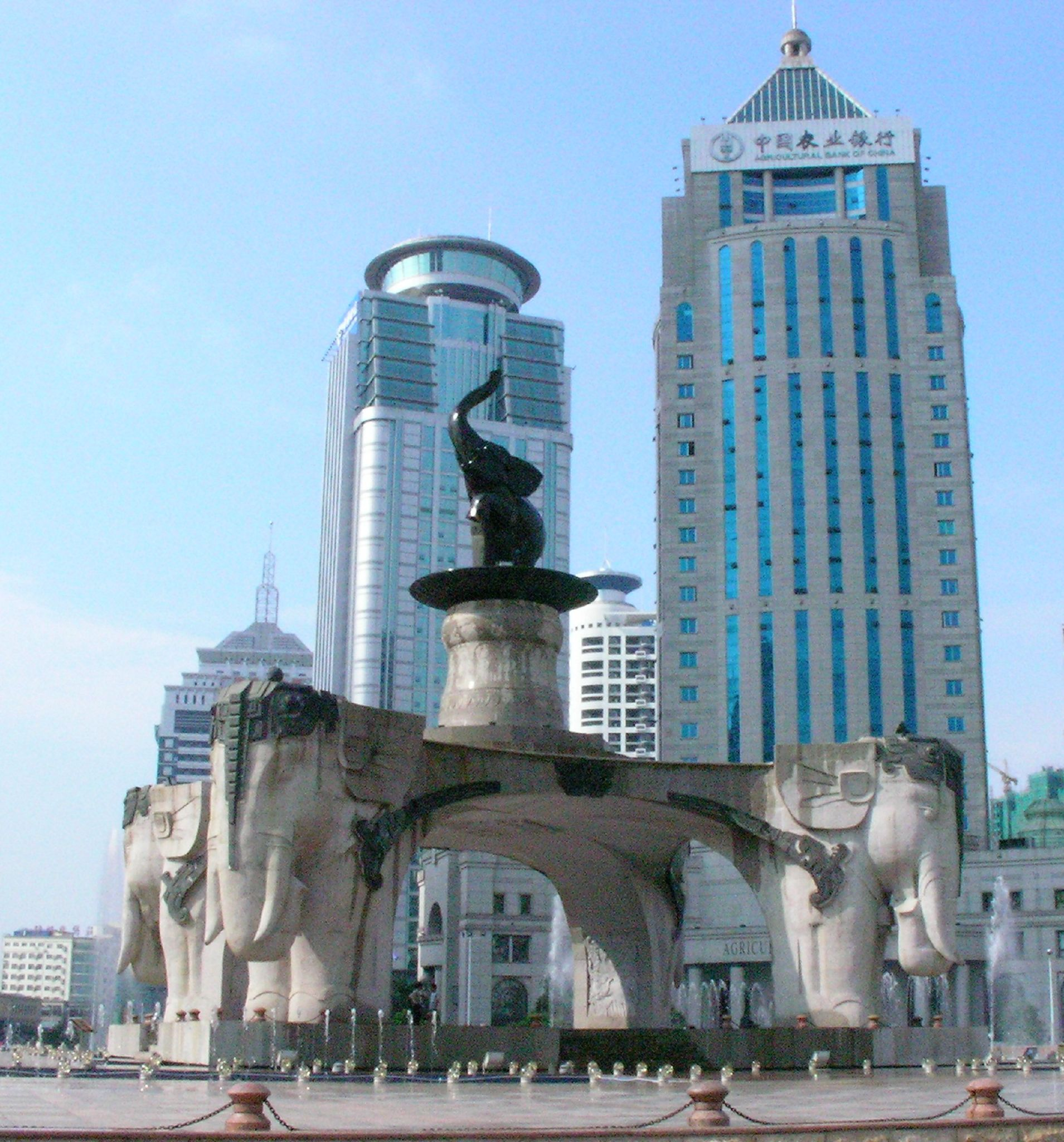
A fountain in Wuxiang Square – the start and finish point for the race

The half marathon course was designed in a double-looped, or figure eight, format which had Wuxiang Square as the central start and finish point for the race, situated just off Nanning's Minzu Avenue. The route left the square in a westerly direction along Minzu Avenue, before turning north on Binhu Road. It turned left onto Changu Road and followed Dongge Road up to the Guangxi People's Hall, which was around the 8 km mark. Turning back eastwards via Minsheng Road and Gonghe Road, the route ran along the straightway of Minzu Avenue, passing the halfway marker at this point.

The racers then headed right to go south along Shuangyong Road and Qingshan Road, passing the Qingzhu Flyover on their way. Going northwards along Zhuxi Avenue, the race came up to the Nanning International Convention and Exhibition Center and headed east on Minzu Road before doubling back via Qingxiu Road. Tracing a path alongside The Admiral City Shopping Mall, the route went east to return the starting point of Wuxiang Square. There was little elevation on the generally flat course, which ranged between eight and twelve metres wide along the route.

The championships were held on 16 October 2010. The women's race began at 8:30am local time (GMT+8) and the men's competition began half an hour after this. In addition to the elite races, a complementary mass fun run event of 10 km and 4 km was held for the people of Nanning (beginning at 9:15am). The competitions took place in the morning in order to avoid the heat of the day in what is one of PR China's most southerly cities.

Nanhu Park was the designated training area for the athletes in attendance.

== Medallists ==
Event	Gold		Silver		Bronze	
Individual
Men	Wilson Kiprop (KEN)	1:00:07	Zersenay Tadesse (ERI)	1:00:11	Sammy Kitwara (KEN)	1:00:22
Women	Florence Kiplagat (KEN)	1:08:24	Dire Tune (ETH)	1:08:34	Peninah Arusei (KEN)	1:09:05
Team
Team Men	Kenya	3:01:32	Eritrea	3:03:04	Ethiopia	3:05:26
Team Women	Kenya	3:26:59	Ethiopia	3:27:33	Japan	3:33:40

== Men's race ==
The favourite for the men's race was Eritrean runner Zersenay Tadese (the defending champion with four straight wins), who had broken the world record earlier that year with a run of 58:23 minutes at the Lisbon Half Marathon. Newly minted African Champion Wilson Kiprop was the most prominent of the Kenyan contingent, which was the clear favourite for the team title through its hoard of sub-60 minute runners including Sammy Kitwara, Silas Kipruto and Moses Mosop. Other contenders were Ethiopian Lelisa Desisa and Eritrean Samuel Tsegay. Kenya was the defending champion in the team race.

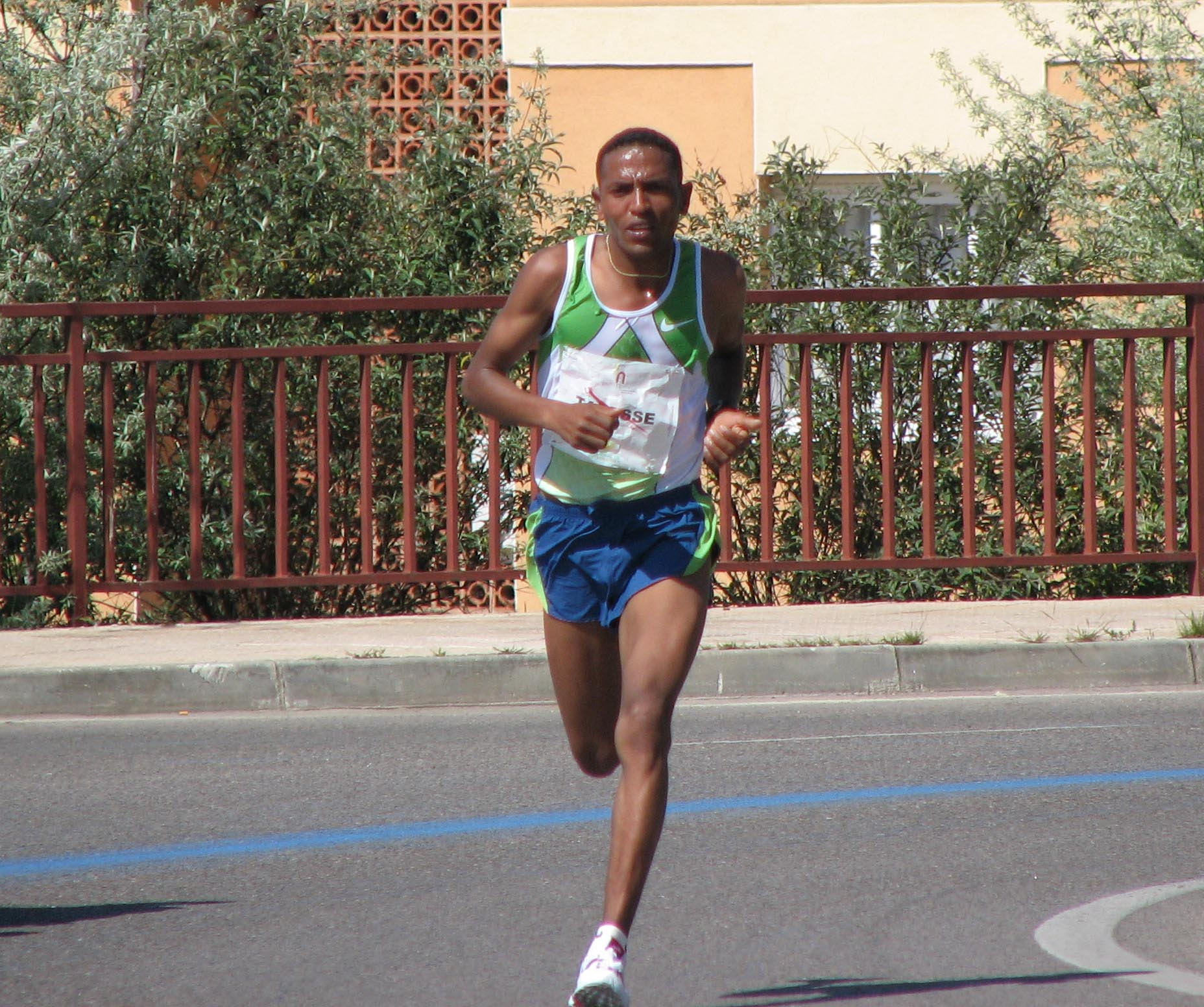
Zersenay Tadese (pictured in Cáceres in 2007) attempted to extend his winning streak at the championships

The hot and humid conditions in Nanning slowed the runners' pace and twelve of them remained within the main pack by the 10 km point. The following five kilometres was decisive for the race, as Samuel Tsegay, Titus Masai and Mosop were all left trailing. The leading four runners were soon reduced to three, as Kipruto fell away to leave Zersenay Tadese, Wilson Kiprop and Sammy Kitwara to battle for the medal positions. Zersenay and Kiprop were neck and neck in the lead from the last kilometre and it was Kiprop who pulled away in the final 100 metres to break the Eritrean's four-year undefeated streak. Zersenay faded badly at the end and appeared injured after taking second place. Kitwara and Kipruto were third and fourth, sealing the Kenyan team victory, while Samuel Tsegay's fifth place helped Eritrea to the team silver.

The win continued Kiprop's meteoric rise of 2010 – a year in which he had gone from a low-profile circuit runner to the 10,000 metres Kenyan and African champion, with a sub-60 minute half marathon best after wins in Paris and Lille. Silver medallist Zersenay received some consolation as he was given the AIMS/Citizen World's Fastest Time Award days after the competition in respect of his position as world record holder, becoming only the second half marathon athlete to be selected for the accolade after Lornah Kiplagat. There were no surprise breakthroughs in the men's race as all the top performers were those predicted to make an impact before the race. However, there were some other achievements of note including: Kitwara's first individual medal for Kenya, personal bests for Birhanu Bekele and Tomoya Onishi in eighth and ninth place respectively, and (much further back in the field) a national record for Bhutanese racer Passang Passang.

=== Men's results ===
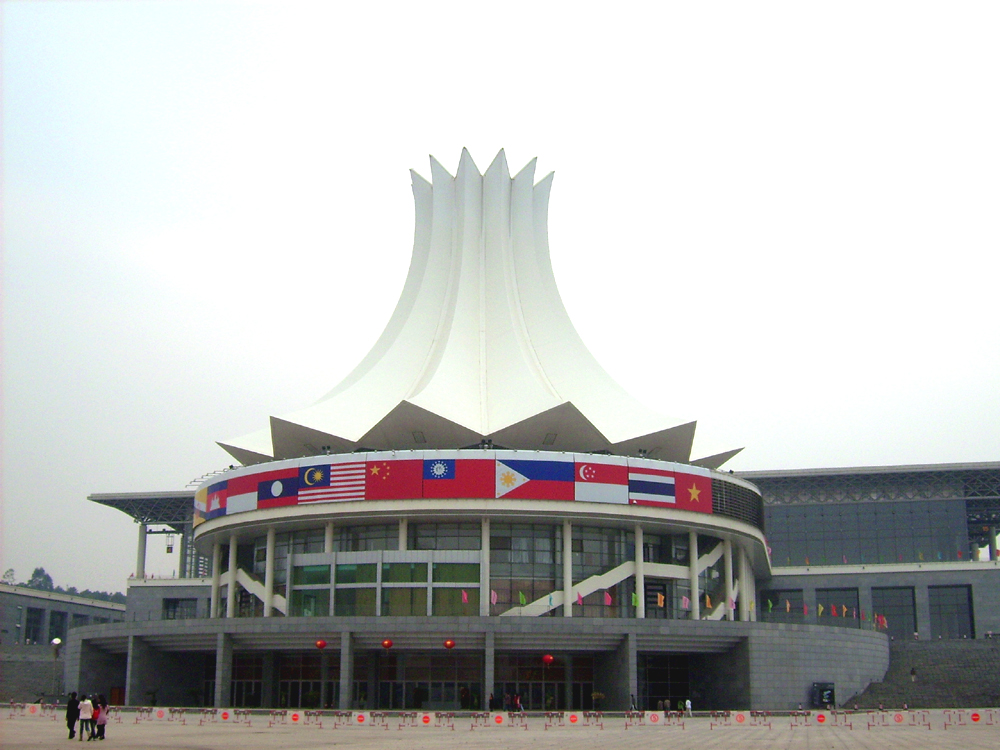
The Nanning International Convention and Exhibition Center was one of the landmarks along the race route

Individual
Rank	Athlete	Nationality	Time	Notes
Gold medal	Wilson Kiprop	Kenya	1:00:07	
Silver medal	Zersenay Tadese	Eritrea	1:00:11	
Bronze medal	Sammy Kitwara	Kenya	1:00:22	
4	Silas Kipruto	Kenya	1:01:03	
5	Samuel Tsegay	Eritrea	1:01:13	SB
6	Titus Masai	Kenya	1:01:24	
7	Lelisa Desisa	Ethiopia	1:01:28	
8	Birhanu Bekele	Ethiopia	1:01:28	PB
9	Tomoya Onishi	Japan	1:01:31	PB
10	Moses Mosop	Kenya	1:01:31	
11	Tewelde Estifanos	Eritrea	1:01:40	PB
12	Tsuyoshi Ugachi	Japan	1:01:49	PB
13	Amanuel Mesel	Eritrea	1:02:07	PB
14	Adhanom Abraha	Eritrea	1:02:13	PB
15	Asefa Mengstu	Ethiopia	1:02:30	PB
16	Lungisa Mdedelwa	South Africa	1:02:58	
17	Damião de Souza	Brazil	1:03:07	PB
18	Samuel Segoaba	South Africa	1:03:09	
19	Sean Quigley	United States	1:03:23	PB
20	Ruben Iindongo	France	1:03:26	
21	Masato Imai	Japan	1:03:28	SB
22	Wissem Hosni	Tunisia	1:03:30	PB
23	Antonio Vega	United States	1:03:37	
24	Moorosi Soke	South Africa	1:03:46	
25	Rachid Nadij	Spain	1:03:47	PB
26	Zolani Ntongana	South Africa	1:03:49	
27	Ali Abdosh	Ethiopia	1:04:26	PB
28	Abuna Junid	Ethiopia	1:04:36	PB
29	John Cusi	Peru	1:04:43	
30	Djamel Bachiri	France	1:04:49	
31	Osamu Ibata	Japan	1:04:49	
32	Yang Dinghong	China	1:04:50	
33	Driss El-Himer	France	1:04:52	
34	José Ríos	Spain	1:04:53	
35	Jaime Caldua	Peru	1:05:00	
36	Lucketz Swartbooi	Namibia	1:05:27	
37	Constantino León	Peru	1:05:29	
38	Sergio Pedraza	Mexico	1:05:30	SB
39	Andrew Carlson	United States	1:05:38	SB
40	Giovane dos Santos	Brazil	1:05:41	
41	His Youssouf	Djibouti	1:05:45	PB
42	Mande Ilunga	DR Congo	1:06:14	PB
43	Yohan Durand	France	1:06:29	
44	Clinton Perrett	Australia	1:06:47	SB
45	Boiphemelo Selagaboy	Botswana	1:07:12	PB
46	Li Fei	China	1:07:13	PB
47	Kelebonye Simbowa	Botswana	1:07:19	PB
48	Raúl Pacheco	Peru	1:07:22	
49	Pedro Santos	Spain	1:07:24	
50	Sibusiso Nzima	South Africa	1:07:26	
51	Ndabili Bashingili	Botswana	1:07:28	SB
52	Hassan El Ahmadi	France	1:07:50	SB
53	Ramoseka Raobine	Botswana	1:08:16	PB
54	Kaelo Mosalagae	Botswana	1:08:25	SB
55	Gao Laiyuan	China	1:08:55	
56	Ben Bruce	United States	1:09:26	PB
57	Goumaneh Omar Doualeh	Djibouti	1:09:41	PB
58	Stephen Shay	United States	1:10:12	
59	Eisa Hassan Marzouk	Egypt	1:10:26	PB
60	Cristinel Irimia	Romania	1:11:09	
61	Joaquim Chamane	Angola	1:11:43	SB
62	Erick Pérez	Mexico	1:11:52	
63	Shaban Mustafa	Bulgaria	1:11:59	
64	Aleksandr Moh	Kyrgyzstan	1:13:10	PB
65	Akihiko Tsumurai	Japan	1:13:28	
66	Mihail Krassilov	Kazakhstan	1:15:11	PB
67	Pasang Pasang	Bhutan	1:16:43	NR
68	Chan Chan Kit	Macau	1:18:07	SB

Team
Rank	Country	Team	Time
Gold medal	Kenya	Wilson Kiprop; Sammy Kitwara; Silas Kipruto	3:01:32
Silver medal	Eritrea	Zersenay Tadese; Samuel Tsegay; Tewelde Estifanos	3:03:04
Bronze medal	Ethiopia	Lelisa Desisa; Birhanu Bekele; Asefa Mengstu	3:05:26
4	Japan	Tomoya Onishi; Tsuyoshi Ugachi; Masato Imai	3:06:48
5	South Africa	Lungisa Mdedelwa; Samuel Segoaba; Moorosi Soke	3:09:53
6	United States	Sean Quigley; Antonio Vega; Andrew Carlson	3:12:38
7	France	Ruben Iindongo; Djamel Bachiri; Driss El-Himer	3:13:07
8	Peru	John Cusi; Jaime Caldua; Constantino León	3:15:12
9	Spain	Rachid Nadij; José Ríos; Pedro Santos	3:16:04
10	China	Yang Dinghong; Li Fei; Gao Laiyuan	3:20:58
11	Botswana	Boiphemelo Selagaboy; Kelebonye Simbowa; Ndabili Bashingili	3:21:59

- Totals: 68 starters, 68 finishers, 26 nations represented, 11 national teams ranked.

== Women's race ==
The provisional favourite for the women's race was Kenyan runner Florence Kiplagat, who was the fastest entrant in the field through her win at the Lille Half Marathon in September (also her debut for the distance). Her compatriots Peninah Arusei and Sarah Chepchirchir – second and third in Lille – completed the strongest three of the Kenyan women's team, which was considered the team to beat for the title. The Ethiopians, led by Boston Marathon winner Dire Tune, were their main opposition for the team race, although the nation had sent relatively inexperienced runners to the championships on this occasion. China's leading athlete was Zhu Xiaolin, who despite being an established marathon runner had less experience over the half distance. Although Japan lacked a leading figure individually, their overall consistency (which had brought them team medals in the last five editions) demonstrated their team pedigree. Kenya entered the tournament as the reigning team champions.

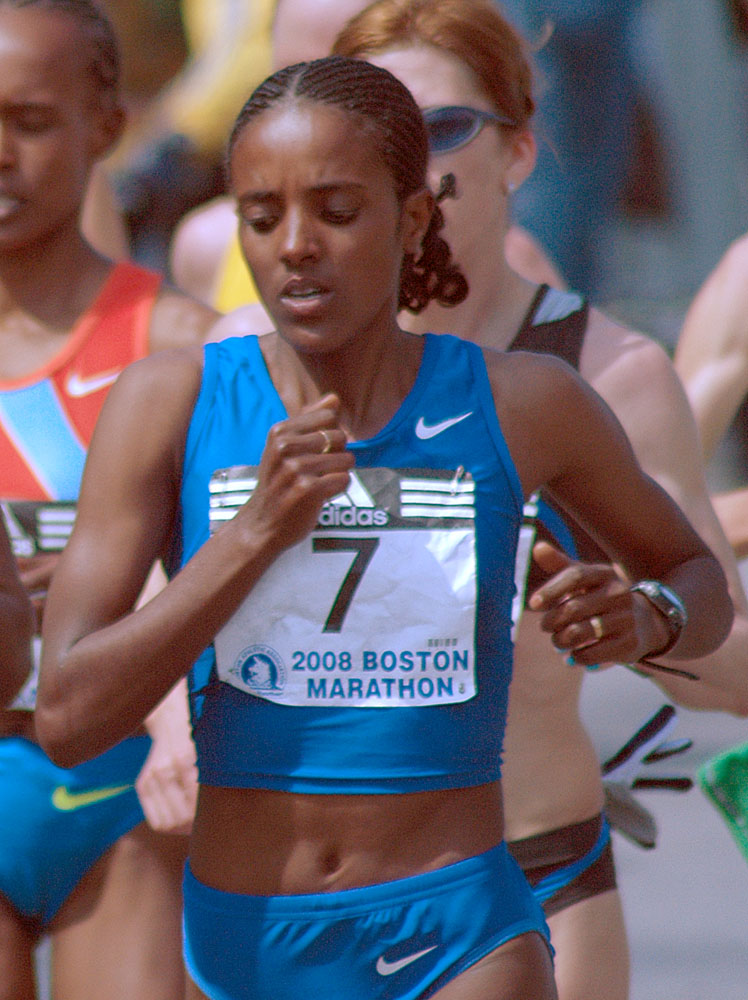
Dire Tune (shown running at the Boston Marathon) led the Ethiopian women's challenge

The beginning to the race highlighted the dominance of the Kenyan and Ethiopian runners as they set a high tempo from the outset. By the time the first 5 km marker was passed, Australia's Nikki Chapple was the only athlete left in the leading pack to come from outside the two historically strong nations. A few kilometres later, she dropped back from the pack and at the 10 km mark five Ethiopians and four Kenyans had a fifteen-second advantage on the rest of the field. As the race reached the midway point, the temperature began to increase and the heat and humidity reduced the pace of the runners. The conditions took their toll on some of the leaders in this section of the race. Chepchirchir slowed considerably while Meseret Mengistu, Joyce Chepkirui and Fate Tola were the next to gradually lose contact with the front runners. Kiplagat, Dire, Arusei and Feyse Tadese were the sole contenders remaining as the race headed towards the final stages, but Kiplagat and Dire soon left the other two trailing a few minutes later.

Despite Dire's greater experience over long distances, it was Kiplagat who forged ahead in the last kilometre and she won the race with ten seconds to spare over her Ethiopian rival. Arusei was the third across the line half a minute later, while Feyse Tadese, Joyce Chepkirui, Meseret Mengistu and Fate Tola took places 4–7 around one minute behind the winner. It was Arusei's clear third place which proved the difference between the top African teams, as Kenya won the team gold by a margin of 34 seconds over Ethiopia. A strong final phase saw Zhu Xiaolin take eighth place for the hosts, which was the best non-African individual performance that year. Japan's Yoshimi Ozaki and Ryoko Kizaki were immediately behind her, failing to get a top eight finish but yet again leading the country to the team bronze with a buffer of over six minutes between them and Australia.

Kiplagat collected her first international road running title in only her second effort over the half marathon distance – her second world title after the senior crown at the 2009 IAAF World Cross Country Championships. She said her next priority would be taking a medal on the track "That is my goal for next year (World Championships in Daegu) and at the next Olympics". For Dire and Arusei – both prolific road runners – this was their first individual medal on the world stage. The younger Ethiopians (Feyse Tadese, Meseret Mengistu and Fate Tola) missed out on the medals but still set personal bests for the half marathon, as did Kenyan Joyce Chepkirui.

=== Women's results ===
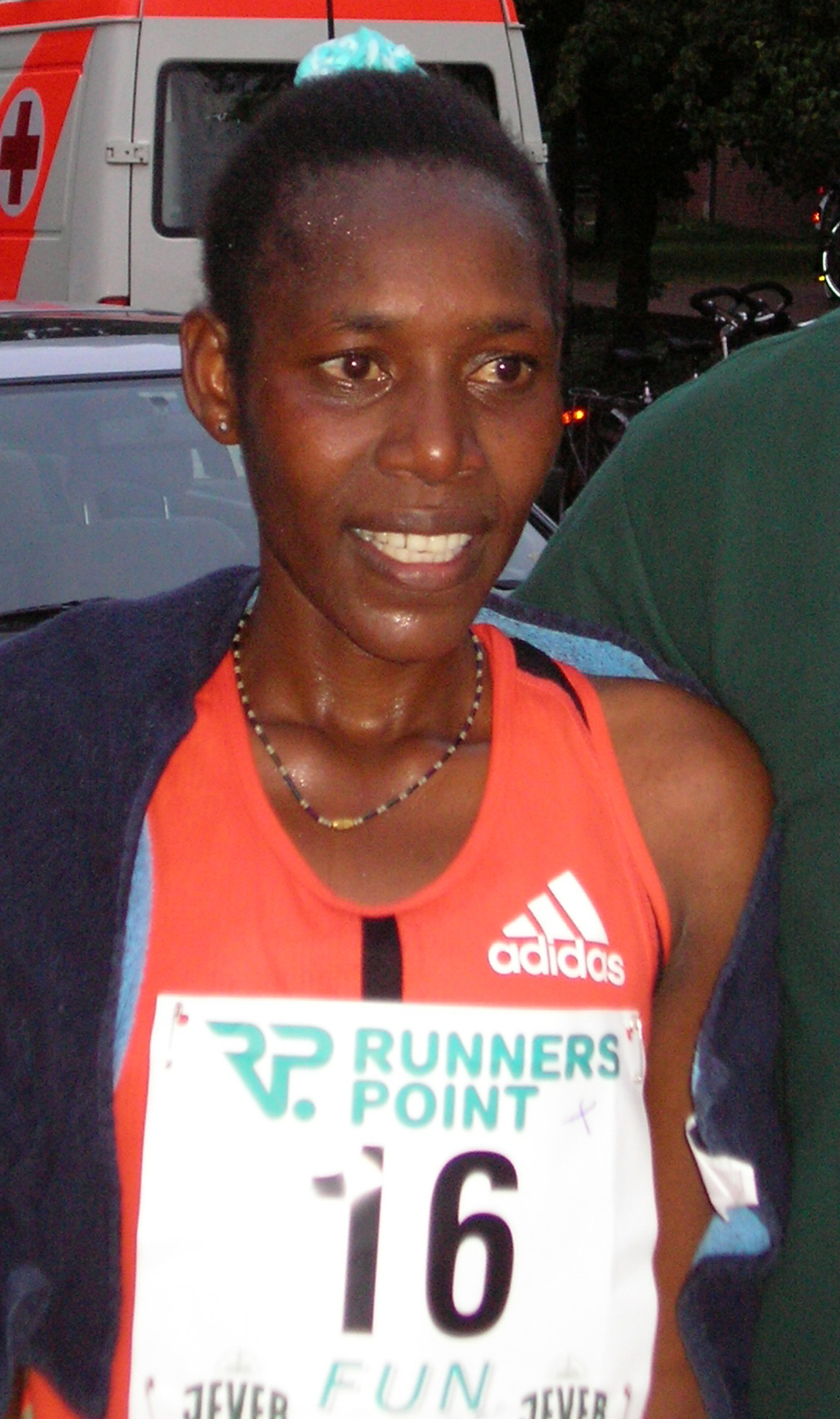
Peninah Arusei (pictured in 2007) won a bronze medal to help Kenya to the team gold.

Individual
Rank	Athlete	Nationality	Time	Notes
Gold medal	Florence Kiplagat	Kenya	1:08:24	
Silver medal	Dire Tune	Ethiopia	1:08:34	
Bronze medal	Peninah Arusei	Kenya	1:09:05	
4	Feyse Tadese	Ethiopia	1:09:28	PB
5	Joyce Chepkirui	Kenya	1:09:30	PB
6	Meseret Mengistu	Ethiopia	1:09:31	PB
7	Fate Tola	Ethiopia	1:09:38	PB
8	Zhu Xiaolin	China	1:11:01	
9	Yoshimi Ozaki	Japan	1:11:02	
10	Ryoko Kizaki	Japan	1:11:03	
11	Sarah Chepchirchir	Kenya	1:11:03	
12	Nicole Chapple	Australia	1:11:25	
13	Azusa Nojiri	Japan	1:11:35	
14	Abebech Afework	Ethiopia	1:11:38	
15	Hiroko Miyauchi	Japan	1:11:40	
16	Helalia Johannes	Namibia	1:11:57	SB
17	Karolina Jarzyńska	Poland	1:12:36	
18	Claire Hallissey	Great Britain	1:13:07	
19	Stephanie Rothstein	United States	1:13:37	SB
20	Eden Tesfalem	Eritrea	1:13:41	PB
21	Gladys Tejeda	Peru	1:13:46	PB
22	Marisol Romero	Mexico	1:14:13	PB
23	Karina Pérez	Mexico	1:14:20	SB
24	Jessica Trengove	Australia	1:14:21	
25	Adriana Aparecida da Silva	Brazil	1:14:24	
26	Benita Willis	Australia	1:14:28	
27	Sueli Silva	Brazil	1:14:31	
28	Jimena Misayauri	Peru	1:14:31	
29	Noriko Higuchi	Japan	1:14:56	
30	Fabiana Cristine da Silva	Brazil	1:15:10	
31	Louisa Leballo	South Africa	1:15:11	
32	Karine Pasquier	France	1:15:19	
33	Paula Todoran	Romania	1:15:29	
34	Azucena Díaz	Spain	1:15:38	
35	Hao Xiaofan	China	1:16:03	
36	Samia Akbar	United States	1:16:15	
37	Zintle Xiniwe	South Africa	1:16:21	
38	Loretta Kilmer	United States	1:16:32	
39	Kristen Zaitz	United States	1:16:51	
40	Julia Rivera	Peru	1:17:43	
41	Heidi Westover/Westerling	United States	1:18:06	
42	Cassie Fien	Australia	1:18:59	
43	Mpho Mabuza	South Africa	1:19:24	
44	Ding Changqin	China	1:20:01	
45	Amira Ben Amor	Tunisia	1:20:19	
46	Silvia Danekova	Bulgaria	1:21:21	
47	Paula Apolonio	Mexico	1:23:01	
48	Luz Eliana Silva	Chile	1:23:25	
49	Irvette van Blerk	South Africa	1:24:52	
50	Thozama April	South Africa	1:26:48	
51	Ho Pui Yan	Macau	1:42:13	
—	Melinda Vernon	Australia	DNF	
—	Emily Tallen	Canada	DNF	
—	Patricia Laubertie	France	DNF	
—	Eunice Kales	Kenya	DNF	

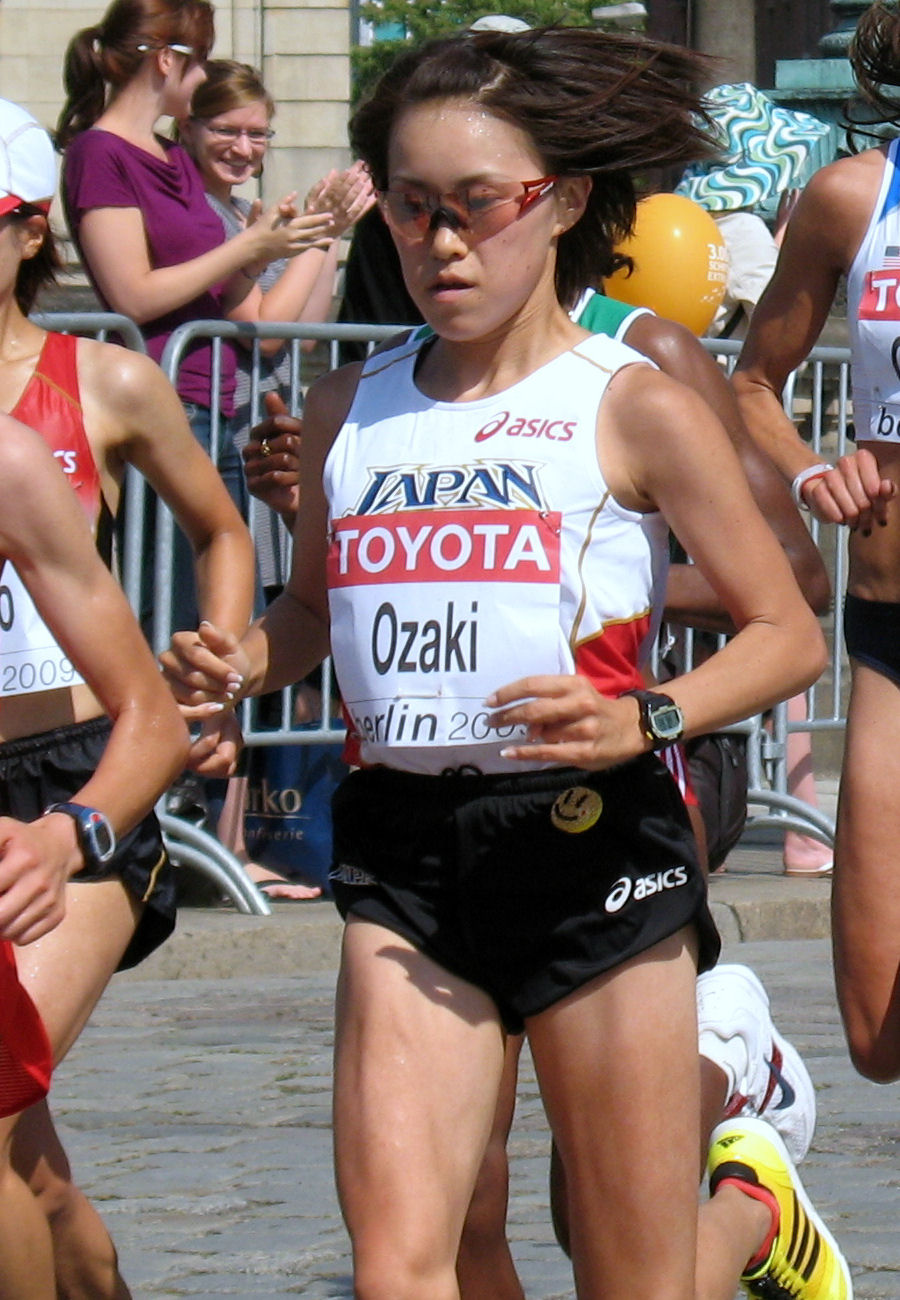
Japan's Yoshimi Ozaki (shown running in the 2009 World Championship Marathon) led her team to a sixth consecutive team medal.

Team
Rank	Country	Team	Time
Gold medal	Kenya	Florence Jebet Kiplagat; Peninah Jerop Arusei; Joyce Chepkirui	3:26:59
Silver medal	Ethiopia	Dire Tune; Feyse Tadese; Meseret Mengistu	3:27:33
Bronze medal	Japan	Yoshimi Ozaki; Ryoko Kizaki; Azusa Nojiri	3:33:40
4	Australia	Nicole Chapple; Jessica Trengove; Benita Willis	3:40:14
5	Brazil	Adriana Aparecida da Silva; Sueli Silva; Fabiane Cristine da Silva	3:44:05
6	Peru	Gladys Tejeda; Jimena Misayauri; Julia Rivera	3:46:00
7	United States	Stephanie Rothstein; Samia Akbar; Loretta Kilmer	3:46:24
8	China	Zhu Xiaolin; Hao Xiaofan; Ding Changqin	3:47:05
9	South Africa	Louisa Leballo; Zintle Xiniwe; Mpho Mabuza	3:50:56
10	Mexico	Marisol Romero; Karina Pérez; Paula Apolonio	3:51:34

- Totals: 55 starters, 51 finishers, 22 nations represented, 10 teams ranked.

== Participation ==
A total of thirty nations were represented at the championships, with a combined total of 123 male and female athletes in attendance. Five countries entered the maximum of five athletes per race: Ethiopia, Japan, Kenya, South Africa, and the United States. British runner Andrew Lemoncello was scheduled to be his country's sole representative in the men's race, but he was refused entry into the country without explanation, causing a dispute between UK Athletics and the Chinese Athletic Association.

Number of athletes in parentheses

- Angola (1)
- Australia (6)
- Bhutan (1)
- Botswana (5)
- Brazil (5)
- Bulgaria (2)
- Canada (1)
- Chile (1)
- China (6)
- Democratic Republic of the Congo (1)
- Djibouti (2)
- Egypt (1)
- Eritrea (6)
- Ethiopia (10)
- France (7)
- Japan (10)
- Kazakhstan (1)
- Kenya (10)
- Kyrgyzstan (1)
- Macau (2)
- Mexico (5)
- Namibia (2)
- Peru (7)
- Poland (1)
- Romania (2)
- South Africa (10)
- Spain (4)
- Tunisia (2)
- United Kingdom (1)
- United States (10)
