= Abdisa Tola =

Ethiopian long-distance runner and marathon winner

Personal information
- Nationality: Ethiopian
- Born: 3 October 2000 (age 25)

Sport
- Sport: Athletics
- Event(s): Long-distance running, Marathon

Abdisa Tola (born 3 October 2000) is an Ethiopian long-distance runner who specializes in road races, including the marathon and half marathon. He won the 2023 Dubai Marathon in his marathon debut. He is the younger brother of Olympic marathon champion Tamirat Tola.

== Career ==
Abdisa Tola's early career included competing in the half marathon, where he achieved a personal best of 59:54 in October 2021, showcasing his potential in long-distance events.

On 12 February 2023, he won the Dubai Marathon in his debut over the distance, clocking a time of 2:05:42.

In October 2024, Tola won the Sanlam Cape Town Marathon, setting a new course record of 2:08:16.

== Personal bests ==
- Marathon – 2:05:42 (Dubai, 12 February 2023)
- Half Marathon – 59:54 (17 October 2021)
- 25 Kilometres Road – 1:14:27 (18 December 2022)

== Personal life ==
Abdisa Tola is the younger brother of Ethiopian Olympic marathon champion Tamirat Tola. Their family is notable in the athletics community, with Tamirat's wife, Dera Dida, also being an accomplished runner who won the women's 2023 Dubai Marathon on the same day as Abdisa's victory.
