= Cape Town Marathon =

Annual marathon held in Cape Town, South Africa

- Date: May
- Location: Cape Town, South Africa
- Event type: Road
- Distance: Marathon
- Primary sponsor: Sanlam
- Established: 1994; 32 years ago
- Course records: Men: 2:04:55 (Mohamed Esa, 2026); Women: 2:22:22 (Glenrose Xaba, 2024); Wheelchair men: 1:30:20 (David Weir, 2026); Wheelchair women: 1:43:25 (Manuela Schär, 2026)
- Website: Cape Town Marathon
- 2026 Cape Town Marathon

The Cape Town Marathon (Note: Known as the Sanlam Cape Town Marathon for sponsorship reasons.) is an annual marathon held in Cape Town, South Africa. The race has developed into one of Africa's leading standard-distance road marathons and was confirmed as a Abbott World Marathon Major in 2026.

The marathon is run on a road course centred on Green Point and the Cape Town Stadium precinct. In addition to the marathon, the event weekend includes shorter road races and trail running events. The race has hosted the South African marathon championships.

== History ==
The Cape Town Marathon traces its history to 1994, when the event was organised by Celtic Harriers and staged from Mutual Park in Pinelands. The race continued in that form until the early 2000s, before a second phase from 2005 to 2013 under Western Province Athletics and Athletics South Africa.

In 2014, the race entered its Sanlam-sponsored era, with Sanlam becoming naming-rights sponsor and the race being renamed the Sanlam Cape Town Marathon. ASEM Running, and later Faces, became involved in the organisation of the event. In 2017, it became the first marathon in Africa to receive IAAF Gold Label status.

The in-person 2020 edition was cancelled because of the COVID-19 pandemic. The 2025 marathon was cancelled on race day after severe winds damaged event infrastructure and made the route unsafe.

== Abbott World Marathon Majors candidacy ==
The Cape Town Marathon was named as a candidate for the first African race admitted to the Abbott World Marathon Majors in 2021, beginning a multi-year assessment process. Its candidacy became a central part of the event's recent development, influencing its international positioning, elite field and race-week operations.

After the 2024 race, Abbott World Marathon Majors announced that Cape Town had passed the first stage of its assessment and would proceed to the second stage. Reuters reported that the 2025 edition was intended to meet the second-stage assessment criteria. The cancellation of the 2025 marathon delayed the race's opportunity to complete that part of the assessment process and placed renewed attention on its World Marathon Majors bid.

In 2026, the race entered what was reported as the final phase of its Abbott World Marathon Majors candidacy.

In June 2026, the Cape Town Marathon was confirmed as the first African Abbott World Marathon Major.

== Organisation and sponsorship ==
The event is staged through a partnership involving Western Province Athletics, ASEM Running and the City of Cape Town. Sanlam became naming-rights sponsor in 2014. In 2026, Sanlam renewed its title sponsorship for a further five years.

== Course ==
The Cape Town Marathon has used several route versions since its early editions, but its modern course is centred on Green Point and the Cape Town Stadium precinct. The current route starts near Cape Town Stadium and takes runners through the city centre, Woodstock, Salt River, Mowbray and the southern suburbs before returning through the central city and finishing in Green Point.

The course passes a number of Cape Town landmarks, including Rondebosch Common, the University of Cape Town area, the Castle of Good Hope, Cape Town City Hall, St George's Cathedral, the Company's Garden, the Victoria & Alfred Waterfront and the Sea Point Promenade. A late 6.43 km section of the route takes runners past the finish area at around 35 km before heading out towards Sea Point and returning to Green Point. The section is informally known among local runners as the "Loop of Death", a reference to its position in the closing stages of the race and to runners having to pass the finish area before completing the final loop.

== Other races ==
The Cape Town Marathon event programme expanded in 2014 with the addition of the 10 km Peace Run and trail races over 22 km and 11 km. A longer trail marathon was added to the programme in 2021.

The current event weekend includes the marathon, the 10 km and 5 km Peace Runs, and the Cape Town Trail Marathon events, including longer and shorter trail distances.

== Results ==
The current men's course record is 2:04:55, set by Mohamed Esa in 2026, and the women's course record is 2:22:22, set by Glenrose Xaba in 2024. Wheelchair races form part of the modern event programme, with the current wheelchair course records set in 2026 by David Weir and Manuela Schär.

== See also ==
- Sport in South Africa
- Cape Town Trail Marathon
- List of winners of the Cape Town Marathon
