= Borneo International Marathon =

Annual race in Kota Kinabalu, Malaysia

- Location: Kota Kinabalu, Sabah, Malaysia
- Event type: Road
- Distance: Marathon, half marathon, 10K run
- Established: 2008
- Organizer: Kinabalu Running Club
- Course records: Men's: 2:25:00 (2008) (Kenya) Sammy Kiptoo; Women's: 3:00:05 (2015) (Japan) Azusa Nojiri
- Website: Borneo International Marathon

The Borneo International Marathon (Bahasa Malaysia: Maraton Antarabangsa Borneo) is an annual marathon event held in Kota Kinabalu, Sabah, Borneo Island.

The inaugural race was held on 12 October 2008.

== History ==
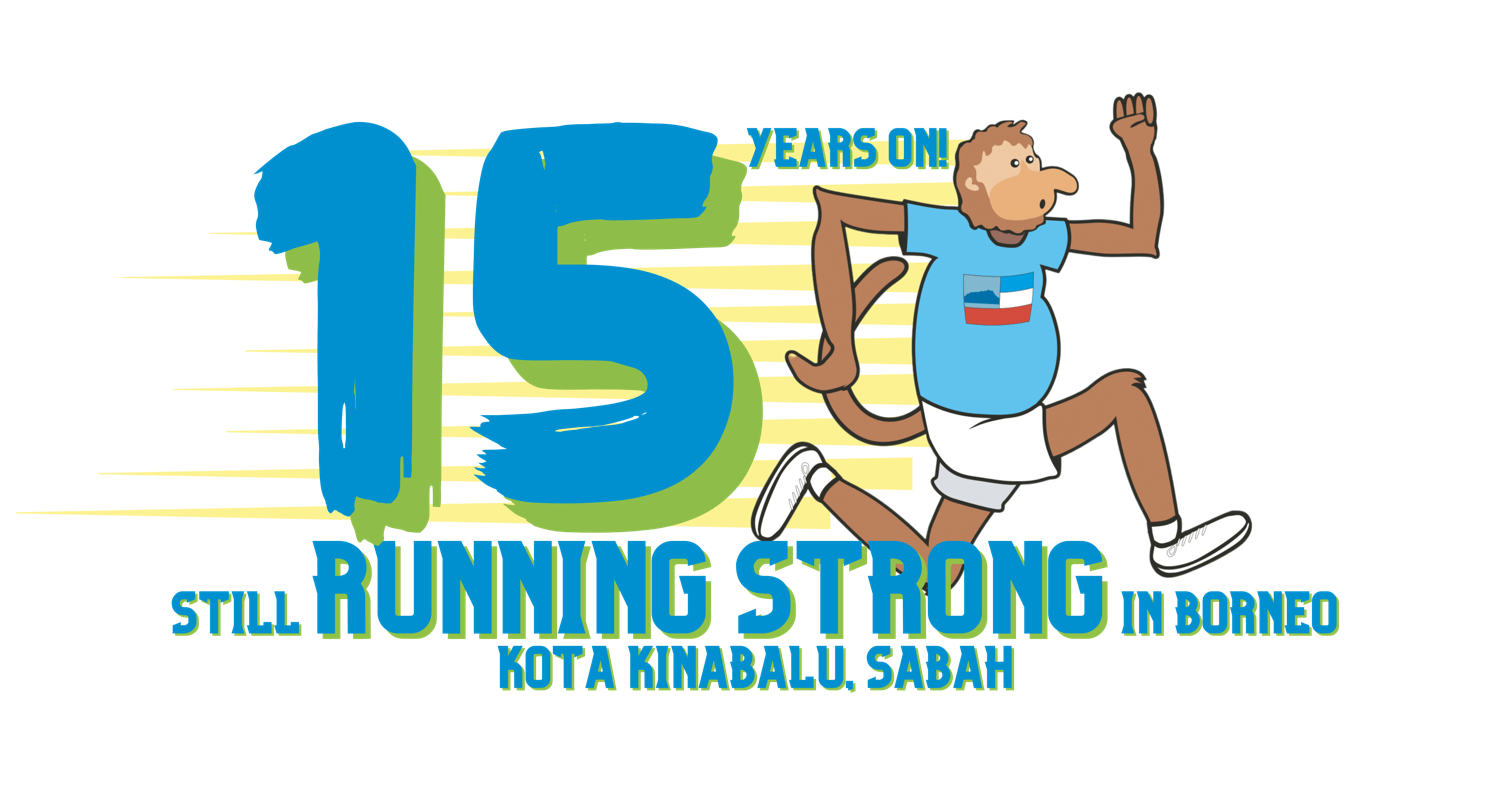

The Borneo International Marathon was started by Andrew Voon, Christopher Nielsen, Urs Weisskop, and Simon Amos.

The inaugural event featured three race categories: 10km, 21km, and 42km, and drew 529 participants.

== Race Categories ==
The Borneo International Marathon features several race categories:

Full Marathon (42km)	Half Marathon (21km)	10km Race
Men Open (18-40 years old)	Men Open (16-40 years old)	Men Junior (13-19 years old)
Women Open (18-40 years old)	Women Open (16-40 years old)	Women Junior (13-19 years old)
Men Veteran (41 -50 years old)	Men Veteran (41-50 years old)	Men Open (20 - 40 years old)
Women Veteran (41 -50 years old)	Women Veteran (41-50 years old)	Women Open (20 - 40 years old)
Men Senior Veteran (51 years & above)	Men Senior Veteran (51 years & above)	Men Veteran (41 years & above)
Women Senior Veteran (51 years & above)	Women Senior Veteran (51 years & above)	Women Veteran (41 years & above)

*remained since 2019

== Route ==
The original route took runners past the University of Malaysia Sabah and 1Borneo Hypermall on the first leg of the full marathon then back past Jalan Istiadat and through the city out to Tanjung Aru before turning round to return to the sports stadium.

== Winners ==
This list of winners below only applies to Full Marathon (42km) only.
Key: Course record

Edition	Year	Men's winner	Nationality	Time (h:m:s)	Women's winner	Nationality	Time (h:m:s)
14th	2024	Trịnh Đình An	Vietnam	2:50:12	Nông Thị Chang	Vietnam	3:14:09
13th	2023	Lê Văn Tuấn	Vietnam	2:42:49	Nguyễn Thị Đường	Vietnam	3:16:41
–	2020	cancelled due to coronavirus pandemic					
–	2021	cancelled due to coronavirus pandemic					
–	2022	cancelled due to coronavirus pandemic					
12th	2019	Safree Sabdin	Malaysia	2:49:44	Linda Then Yee	Malaysia	3:46:17
11th	2018	Jeorge Andrade	Philippines	2:54:14	Nicci Chapman	Great Britain	3:34:05
10th	2017	Kentaro Masuda	Japan	2:58:23	Azusa Nojiri	Japan	3:02:50
9th	2016	Noel Tillor	Philippines	2:48:10	Ting Yu	China	3:52:43
8th	2015	Safrey Sumping	Malaysia	3:12:28	Azusa Nojiri	Japan	3:00:05
7th	2014	John Njihia	Kenya	2:46:41	Kona Liau	Malaysia	3:44:59
6th	2013	Collins Kimosop	Kenya	2:35:21	Kona Liau	Malaysia	3:38:27
5th	2012	Fabian-Osmond Daimon	Malaysia	2:48:09	Claire Walton	Great Britain	3:35:38
4th	2011	Moses Kiptoo	Kenya	2:31:19	Susan Chepkwony	Kenya	3:34:09
3rd	2010	Peter Keter	Kenya	2:38:00	Tagami Mai	Japan	3:23:28
2nd	2009	Johnson Tarus	Kenya	2:31:00	Cecilia Wangui	Kenya	3:05:59
1st	2008	Sammy Kiptoo	Kenya	2:25:00	Fridah Lodepa	Kenya	3:18:04

== Other Races ==
=== Borneo Half Marathon ===
The Kinabalu Running Club also co-organises the Borneo Half Marathon in collaboration with the Kota Kinabalu City Hall (Dewan Bandaraya Kota Kinabalu).

The Borneo Half Marathon features two race categories:

Half Marathon (21km)	10km Race
Men Open (16-30 years old)	Men Open (13-30 years old)
Women Open (16-30 years old)	Women Open (13-30 years old)
Men Junior Veteran (31-40 years old)	Men Junior Veteran (31-40 years old)
Women Junior Veteran (31-40 years old)	Women Junior Veteran (31-40 years old)
Men Veteran (41-50 years old)	Men Veteran (41-50 years old)
Women Veteran (41-50 years old)	Women Veteran (41-50 years old)
Men Senior Veteran (51 years & above)	Men Senior Veteran (51 years & above)
Women Senior Veteran (51 years & above)	Women Senior Veteran (51 years & above)

*remained since 2024
