= Chang Ying =

Chang Ying is the name of:

- Eileen Chang (1920–1995), born Chang Ying, Chinese writer
- Ying Chang Compestine (born 1963), born Chang Ying, Chinese-born American writer
- Chang Ying, a fictional character in the Singaporean TV series Kinship

== See also ==
- Zhang Ying (disambiguation) - "Chang" is the Wade–Giles equivalent of "Zhang"
