= Yoshimi Ozaki =

Japanese marathon runner (born 1981)

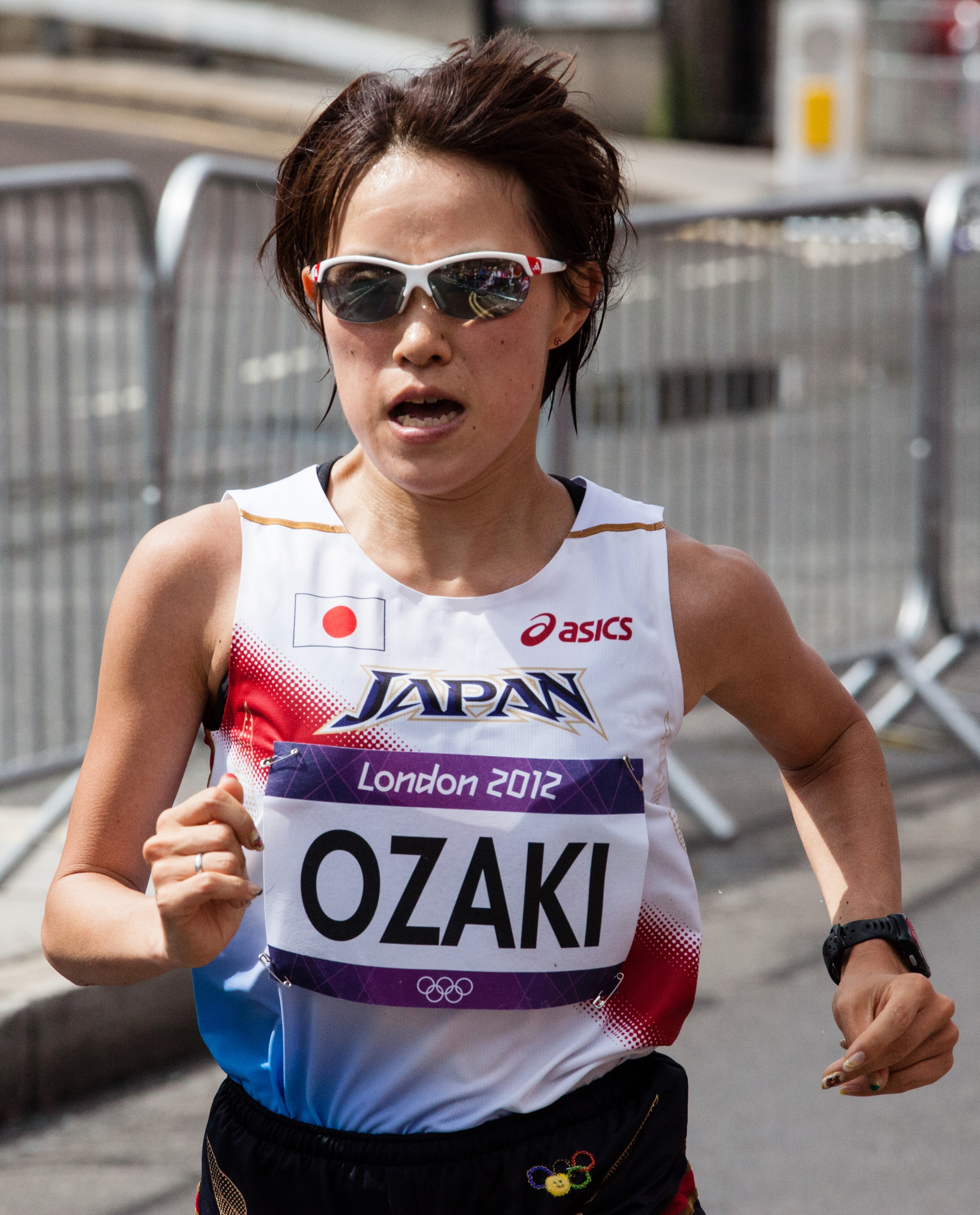
- Yoshimi Ozaki in the Marathon at the 2012 Olympics in London

Personal information
- Born: July 1, 1981 (age 44) Yamakita, Kanagawa, Japan
- Height: 1.55 m (5 ft 1 in)
- Weight: 41 kg (90 lb)

Sport
- Country: Japan
- Sport: Athletics
- Event: Marathon
Medal record
World Championships
Silver medal – second place	2009 Berlin	Marathon

Yoshimi Ozaki (尾崎 好美, Ozaki Yoshimi; born July 1, 1981) is a Japanese long-distance runner, who specializes in the marathon. She won the 2008 Tokyo Women's Marathon in a personal best time of 2:23:30 hours. A year later she took the silver medal in the event at the 2009 World Championships in Athletics.

Ozaki has won international team medals with Japan at the IAAF World Cross Country Championships and the IAAF World Half Marathon Championships. She represented Japan in the marathon at the 2012 Summer Olympics. She is coached by former world marathon medallist Sachiko Yamashita.

== Career ==
Born in Kanagawa Prefecture, she made her senior international debut at the 2006 IAAF World Cross Country Championships and although she finished in 19th place, this was enough to help Japan to the women's team bronze medal. She struck team bronze the following year, this time in the 2007 IAAF World Road Running Championships where she finished 13th overall and ran a half marathon personal best of 1:09:26 hours.

Ozaki opened the 2008 season at the Kagawa Marugame International Half Marathon and she came close to her personal best (1:09:30) to take second place behind Philes Ongori. She made her marathon debut that year at the Nagoya International Women's Marathon and she came close to victory, but her time of 2:26:19 was only enough for second place behind Yurika Nakamura (another athlete making her debut over the distance). Her first win came in only her second outing over the distance as she won the 2008 Tokyo International Women's Marathon in a personal record time of 2:23:30.

She qualified herself for the 2009 World Championships in Berlin and she came in second in a time of 2:25:25, only ten seconds behind Chinese winner Bai Xue. Competing at the 2010 All Japan Corporate Team Half Marathon Championships, she took second place behind defending champion Filomena Cheyech, although her performance as the top finishing Japanese athlete earned her a place on the 2010 IAAF World Half Marathon Championships squad. She finished ninth at the championships in Nanning, a placing which led the Japanese women to the team bronze medal.

She ran at the Yokohama Women's Marathon in February 2011 and broke the course record with a time of 2:23:56, gaining herself a place in the Japanese World Championship squad in the process. However, at the 2011 World Championships in Athletics in Daegu she did not produce the same form and finished 18th with a time of 2:32:31 hours. She returned to the Yokohama women's race in November but was defeated by the less well-known Ryoko Kizaki in the final stretch. She secured a place on the Olympic team with a strong performance of 2:24:14 hours at the Nagoya Marathon, where she was the first Japanese and runner-up behind Albina Mayorova. She placed 19th at the 2012 Olympic marathon.

The 2013 Tokyo Marathon saw Ozaki finish as the top Japanese in fifth place.

== Achievements ==
- All results regarding marathon, unless stated otherwise

Year	Competition	Venue	Position	Notes
Representing Japan
2008	Tokyo Marathon	Tokyo, Japan	1st	2:23:30
2009	World Championships	Berlin, Germany	2nd	2:25:25
2010	World Half Marathon Championships	Nanning, China	9th	1:11:02
2011	World Championships	Daegu, South Korea	18th	2:32:31

== Personal bests ==
Event	Time (h:m:s)	Competition	Venue	Date
5000 m (track)	15:28.55		Tottori, Japan	6 June 2004
10,000 m (track)	31:47.23		Kobe, Japan	24 April 2005
Half marathon (road)	1:09:26	World Road Running Championships	Udine, Italy	14 October 2007
Marathon (road)	2:23:30	Tokyo Marathon	Tokyo, Japan	16 November 2008

- All information taken from IAAF profile.
