= Zhang Yuan =

Zhang Yuan is the name of:

- Zhang Daqian (1899–1983), Chinese painter who used the name Zhang Yuan
- Zhang Hai Yuan (born 1977), a Chinese track and field athlete
- Zhang Yu'an (born 1984), Chinese television personality and radio host in South Korea
- Zhang Yuan (director, born 1926) (1926–2000), a Chinese actress and film director
- Zhang Yuan (director) (born 1963), Chinese filmmaker
- Zhang Yuan (singer) (born 1985), Chinese singer
- Zhang Yuan (footballer, born 1989), Chinese association footballer
- Zhang Yuan (footballer, born 1997), Chinese association footballer
- Zhang Yuan (born 1985), Chinese singer with Top Combine
- Yuan Chang (born 1959), Taiwanese-born American medical researcher
- Belinda Chang (author) or Zhang Yuan (born 1963), Taiwanese writer
