= Yokohama Women's Marathon =

Road race in Yokohama, Japan

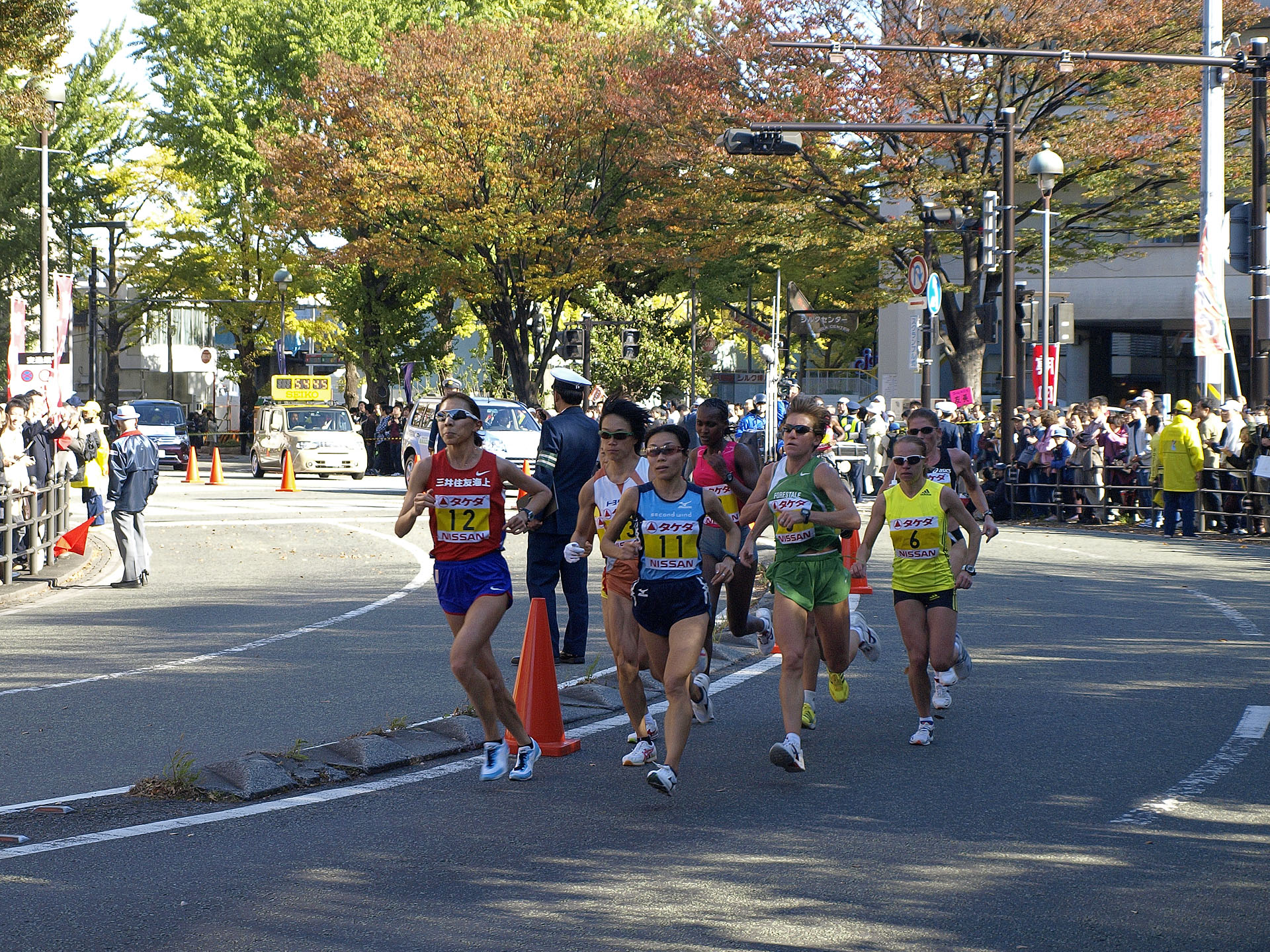
The leading elite runners in the 2009 race

The Yokohama Women's Marathon was a marathon held in Yokohama, Japan, and hosted by Japan Association of Athletics Federations, TV Asahi, the Asahi Shimbun. It is one of the major Japanese women's marathon races which is used to decide selection for the Olympics, along with the Nagoya Marathon and Osaka International Ladies Marathon.

The competition replaced the Tokyo International Women's Marathon which was held in Tokyo from 1979 until 2008. Following the creation of the annual Tokyo Marathon in 2007, which featured its own annual women's marathon, the sponsors decided to move the women's marathon to Yokohama in 2009.

First held on November 15, 2009, it is scheduled for November every year. The second edition was postponed to February 2011 due to APEC Japan 2010 being held that November and the third edition returned to the usual November timing. In 2012 Lydia Cheromei ran a course record time of 2:23:07 hours.

== Winners ==
Key: Course record

Edition	Date	Winner	Country	Time (h:m:s)
1st	November 15, 2009	Kiyoko Shimahara	Japan	2:28:51
2nd	February 20, 2011	Yoshimi Ozaki	Japan	2:23:56
3rd	November 20, 2011	Ryoko Kizaki	Japan	2:26:32
4th	November 18, 2012	Lydia Cheromei	Kenya	2:23:07
5th	November 17, 2013	Albina Mayorova	Russia	2:25:55
6th	November 16, 2014	Tomomi Tanaka	Japan	2:26:57

== Course ==
Yamashita Park->Industrial Trade Center->Yokohama Customs->Kanagawa Prefectural office->Chinatown->Yamashita Park->Industrial Trade Center->Minato Mirai 21->Yokohama Station->Sakuragichō Station->Yokohama Stadium->Yamanote Park->Yamashita Park->Industrial Trade Center->Minato Mirai 21->Yokohama Station->Sakuragichō Station->Yokohama Stadium->Yamanote Park->Industrial Trade Center->Yamashita Park (Finish)
