= Zhang Ying =

Zhang Ying may refer to:

== Sportspeople ==
- Zhang Ying (synchronised swimmer) (born 1963), Chinese synchronised swimmer
- Zhang Ying (fencer) (born 1982), Chinese fencer
- Zhang Ying (footballer) (born 1985), Chinese footballer
- Zhang Ying (gymnast) (born 1988), Chinese rhythmic gymnast
- Zhang Ying (Paralympic swimmer) (born 1990), Chinese Paralympic swimmer
- Zhang Ying (tennis) (born 1996), Chinese tennis player
- Zhang Ying (figure skater) (born 1997), Chinese figure skater
- Zhang Ying (field hockey) (born 1998), Chinese field hockey player

== Others ==
- Cheung Ying (張瑛; Zhāng Yīng, 1919–1984), Hong Kong actor and director
- Eileen Chang (1920–1995), Chinese writer, born Chang Ying (張煐; Zhāng Yīng)
- Ying Chang Compestine (張瀛; Zhāng Yíng, born 1963), Chinese-American writer
- Chong Eng (章瑛; Zhāng Yīng, born 1957), Malaysian politician
- Zhang Ying (actor) (1924–1969), Chinese actor

== See also ==
- Chang Ying (disambiguation)
