= Mohamed Esa =

Ethiopian long-distance runner

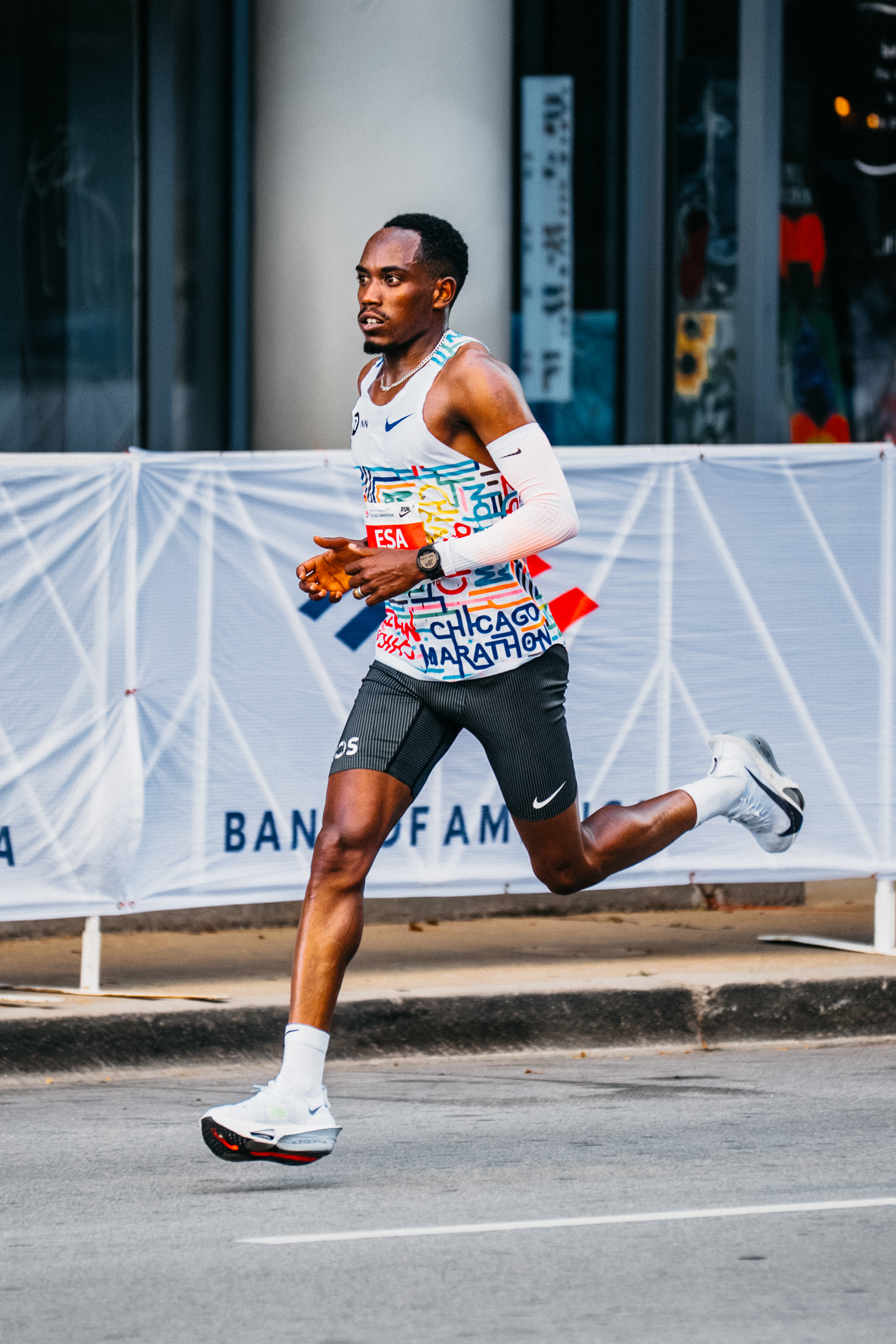
- Esa at mile 25 of the 2025 Chicago Marathon

Personal information
- Nationality: Ethiopian
- Born: Mohamed Esa; 11 September 2000 (age 25) Ethiopia
- Occupation: long-distance runner
- Years active: 2021–present

Sport
- Country: Ethiopia
- Sport: Athletics
- Event(s): Marathon, Half marathon, 10 km
- Club: NN Running Team

Achievements and titles
- Personal bests: 10 km: 28:45 (2022); Half marathon: 59:32 (Poznań 2021); Marathon: 2:04:39 (Chicago 2024)
Medal record
Athletics
Representing Ethiopia
Silver medal – second place	2023 Tokyo	Marathon
Silver medal – second place	2024 Boston	Marathon
Silver medal – second place	2024 Chicago	Marathon
Gold medal – first place	2026 Cape Town	Marathon

Mohamed Esa (born 11 September 2000) is an Ethiopian long-distance runner specializing in road racing events. He has achieved multiple podium finishes in Abbott World Marathon Majors events.

== Career ==
In 2021, Esa won the Poznań Half Marathon with a time of 59:32. Later that year, he finished second at the Lisbon Half Marathon.

He made an impressive marathon debut in 2022 at the Amsterdam Marathon, finishing fifth with a time of 2:05:05.

He secured a second-place finish at the 2023 Tokyo Marathon with a time of 2:05:22, narrowly missing the win. He later placed eighth at the Valencia Marathon, clocking 2:05:40.

In 2024, Esa finished second at the 2024 Boston Marathon with a time of 2:06:58. He continued this success by placing second at the 2024 Chicago Marathon, setting a new personal best of 2:04:39.

== Achievements ==
Year	Race	Place	Position	Time
2021	Poznań Half Marathon	Poznań	1st	59:32
2021	Lisbon Half Marathon	Lisbon	2nd	59:39
2022	Amsterdam Marathon	Amsterdam	5th	2:05:05
2023	Tokyo Marathon	Tokyo	2nd	2:05:22
2023	Valencia Marathon	Valencia	8th	2:05:40
2024	Boston Marathon	Boston	2nd	2:06:58
2024	Chicago Marathon	Chicago	2nd	2:04:39
2025	Chicago Marathon	Chicago	5th	2:04:49
