= Asefa Mengstu =

Ethiopian long-distance runner

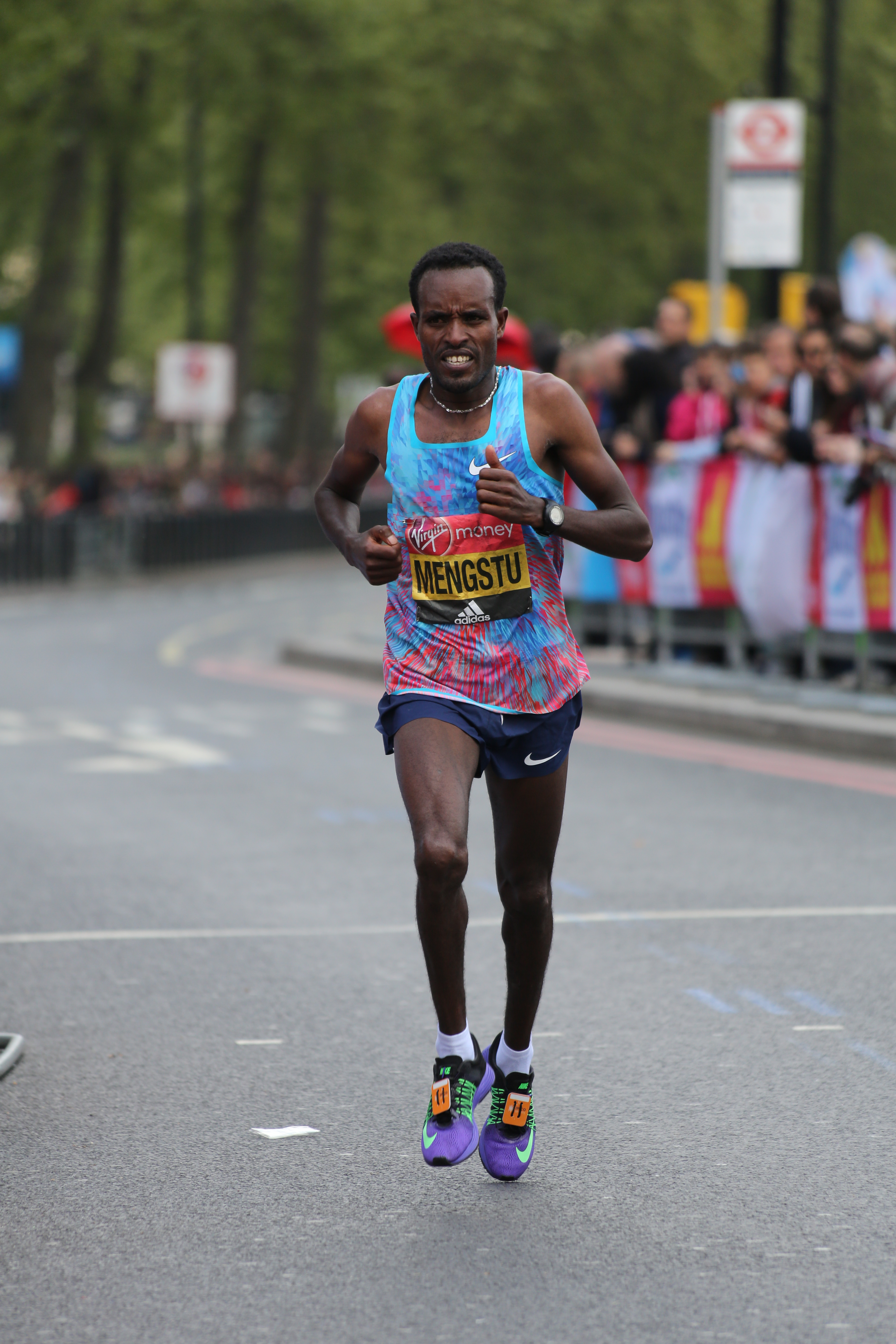
- Asefa Mengstu at the 2017 London Marathon

Personal information
- Born: January 22, 1988 (age 37)

Sport
- Country: Ethiopia
- Sport: Track & Field

Asefa Mengstu (born January 22, 1988) is an Ethiopian long-distance runner who specialises in road running competitions.

== Career ==
Individually, he finished 15th at the 2010 IAAF World Half Marathon Championships, but he won a team bronze medal. Mengstu was the first ever winner of the OR Tambo Marathon. He finished 7th in the 2017 London Marathon. His personal best in the marathon is 2:04:06, set in the 2018 Dubai Marathon.
