= 2010 Berlin Marathon =

Road running event in Berlin, Germany

37th Berlin Marathon
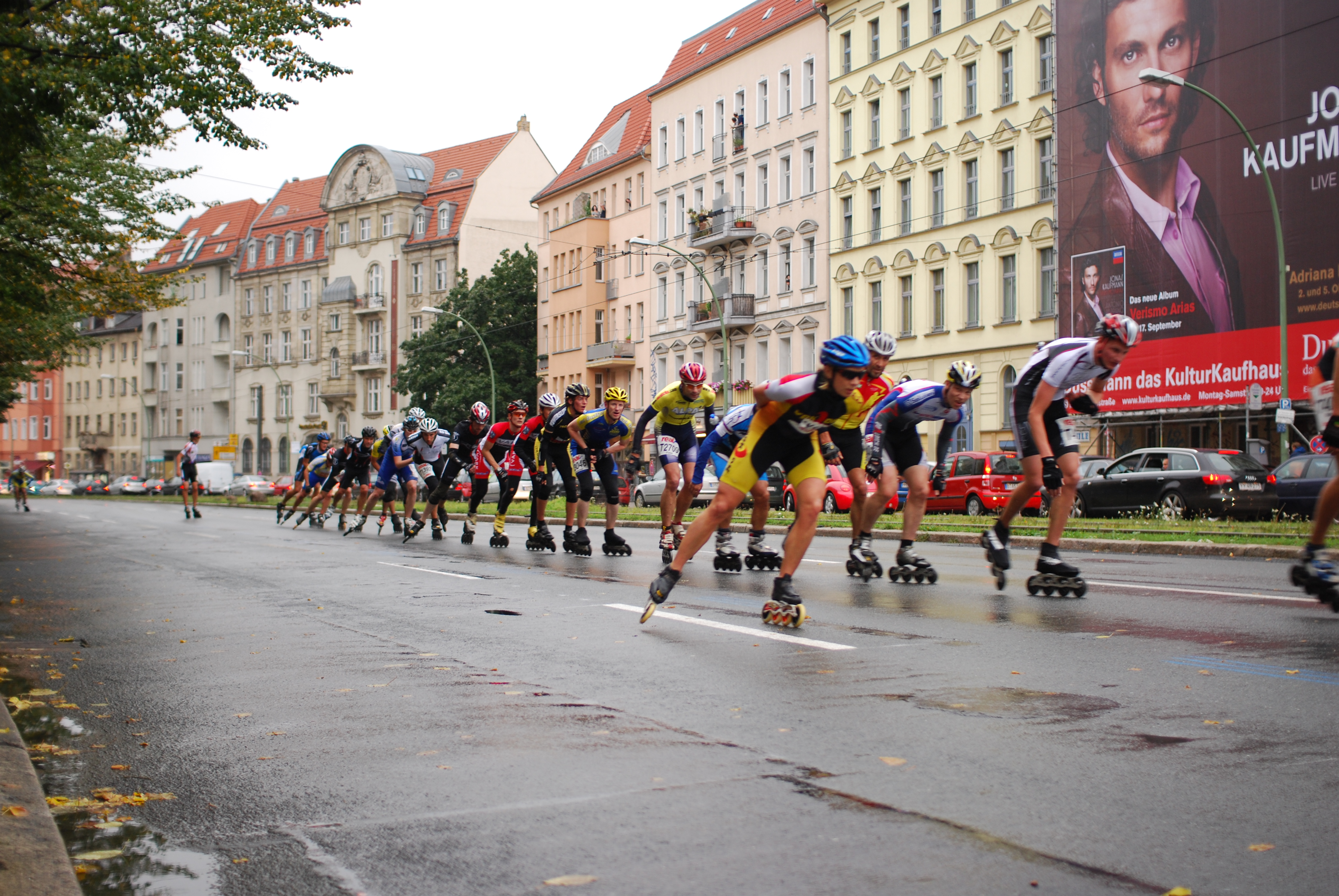
- Skaters taking part in the in-line skating section of the 2010 Berlin Marathon
- Venue: Berlin, Germany
- Dates: 26 September 2010

Champions
- Men: Patrick Makau (2:05:08)
- Women: Aberu Kebede (2:23:58)

The 37th Berlin Marathon took place on Sunday 26 September 2010 on the streets of Berlin, Germany. The competition was sponsored by German retailer real,- and it was the third World Marathon Major of the year, as well as being an IAAF Gold Label Road Race. A total of 35,227 runners started the race and 34,225 of those managed to complete the 42.195 km marathon distance (comprising 26,726 men and 7,499 women). Patrick Makau was the winner of men's marathon while Aberu Kebede took the women's title.

Severin Widmer and Giovanna Turchiarelli were the respective winners of the men's and women's in-line skating races.

== Elite marathon race ==
Headlining the elite men's race were three Kenyan runners: Patrick Makau, Geoffrey Mutai and Eliud Kiptanui. Makau and Mutai had recorded the fifth and eighth fastest times ever, respectively, at the Rotterdam Marathon earlier that year. Kiptanui had impressed with a sub-2:06 clocking to win the Prague Marathon that May, in only his second outing over the distance. Germany's own Sabrina Mockenhaupt was among the contenders for the women's elite race, as were Ethiopian runners Bezunesh Bekele and Aberu Kebede, and Tomo Morimoto of Japan.

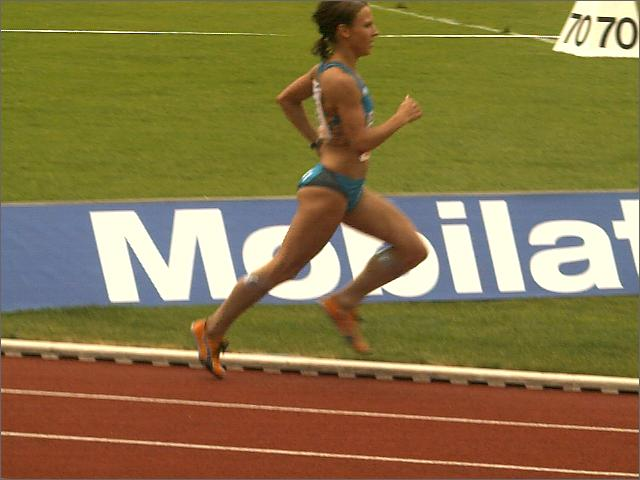
German runner Sabrina Mockenhaupt was one of the favourites for the women's title.

Heavy rain throughout the race put an end to any hopes that Haile Gebrselassie's world record mark from the 2008 edition would be improved. Makau and Mutai were neck-and-neck in the final stretch towards the Brandenburg Gate, which served as the race finishing point. Makau pulled away to win the race by a margin of two seconds over Mutai. Ethiopian Bazu Worku was fifteen seconds behind Mutai and took third place with a personal best time. Aberu Kebede and Bezunesh Bekele were dominant in the women's race and had built up a sizeable lead over the rest of the field by the half-way point. Aberu surged ahead further and won the race with a minute to spare over second-placed Bezunesh. Over a minute behind her, Morimoto was the third to cross the line while Mockenhaupt took a second off her previous personal best for fourth position.

Although it was the first time in 20 years that the Berlin Marathon was affected by rain, the men's race saw the top three finishers run under two hours and six minutes – a first for the competition renowned for its fast, flat course. The top three runners of each race received points for the World Marathon Majors, with first taking 25 points, second earning 15 points and third gaining 10 points. The points earned at the Berlin Marathon had little overall effect on the series rankings as all points-scorers remained outside of the top four and had little chance of earning further points before the close of the 2009–10 competition at the 2010 New York City Marathon two months later.

The podium finishers each earned a portion of the race prize pot: €40,000 for first, €20,000 for second, and prizes of €17,500 and €15,000 for the men's and women's third placers, respectively. The top three men also earned a significant time bonus of €30,000 for completing the distance in under two hours and six minutes, while women's winner Aberu Kebede received a bonus of €15,000 for her finishing time.

== Results ==
=== Men ===
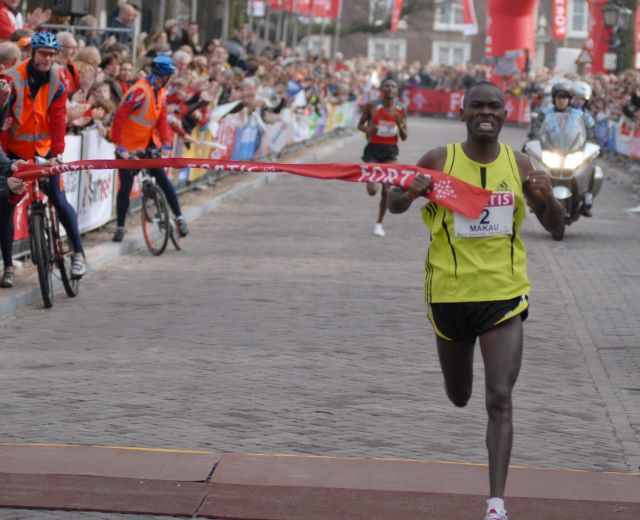
Patrick Makau won the men's elite race.

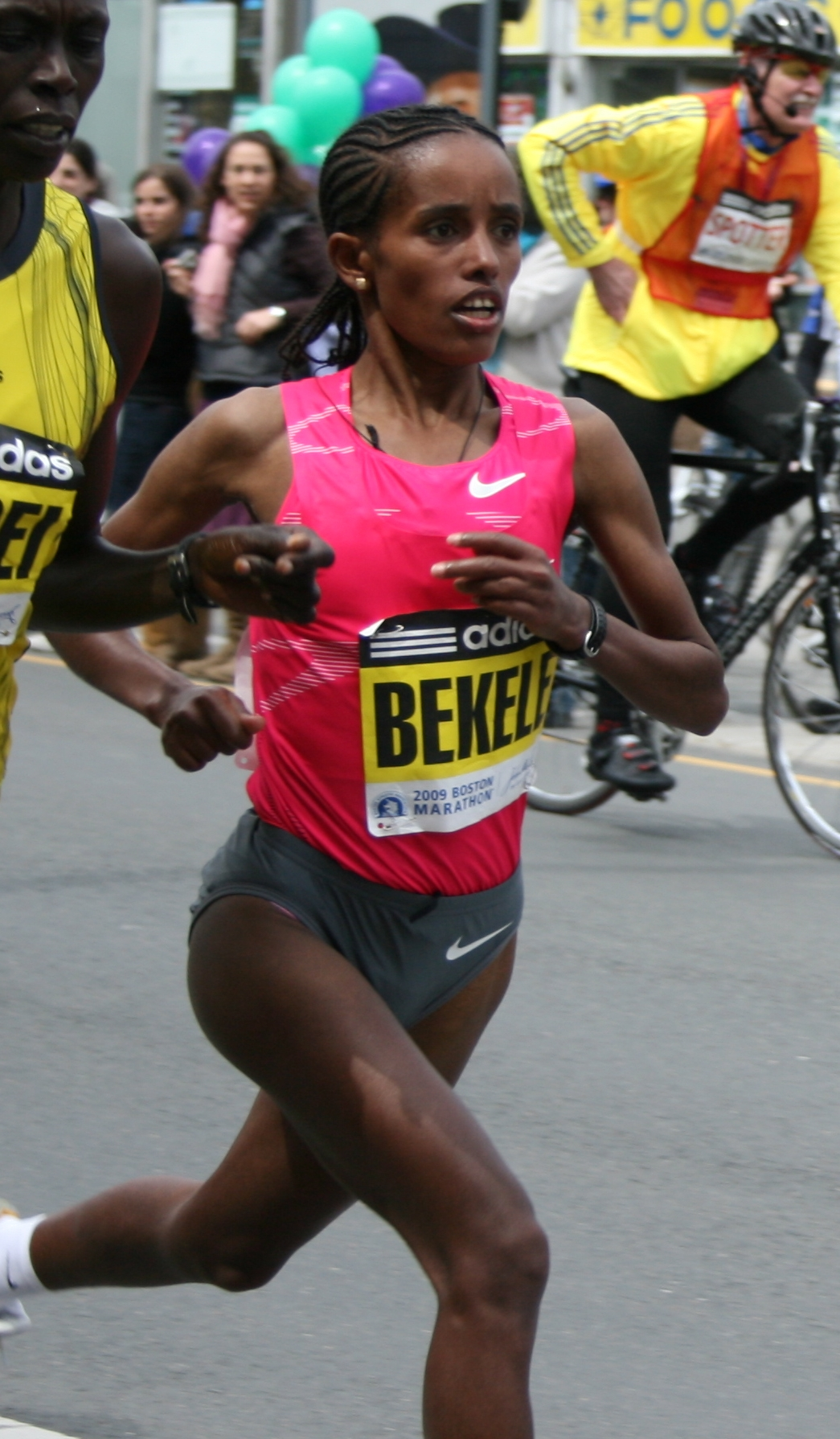
Bezunesh Bekele was the runner-up in the women's race.

Rank	Athlete	Country	Time (h:m:s)
Gold medal	Patrick Makau	Kenya	2:05:08
Silver medal	Geoffrey Mutai	Kenya	2:05:10
Bronze medal	Bazu Worku	Ethiopia	2:05:25
4	Yemane Tsegay	Ethiopia	2:07:52
5	Eliud Kiptanui	Kenya	2:08:05
6	Bernard Kipyego	Kenya	2:08:50
7	Tadese Abraham	Ethiopia	2:09:24
8	Gilbert Yegon	Kenya	2:10:34
9	Masakazu Fujiwara	Japan	2:12:00
10	Ser-Od Bat-Ochir	Mongolia	2:12:42 NR

=== Women ===
Rank	Athlete	Country	Time (h:m:s)
Gold medal	Aberu Kebede	Ethiopia	2:23:58
Silver medal	Bezunesh Bekele	Ethiopia	2:24:58
Bronze medal	Tomo Morimoto	Japan	2:26:10
4	Sabrina Mockenhaupt	Germany	2:26:21
5	Olena Burkovska	Ukraine	2:28:31
6	Adriana Pertea	Romania	2:30:15
7	Adriana Aparecida da Silva	Brazil	2:32:30
8	Tanith Maxwell	South Africa	2:32:33
9	Lisa Stublic	Croatia	2:33:42
10	Agnieszka Gortel	Poland	2:34:47
