= Richard Burgunder =

American mountaineer (born 1979)

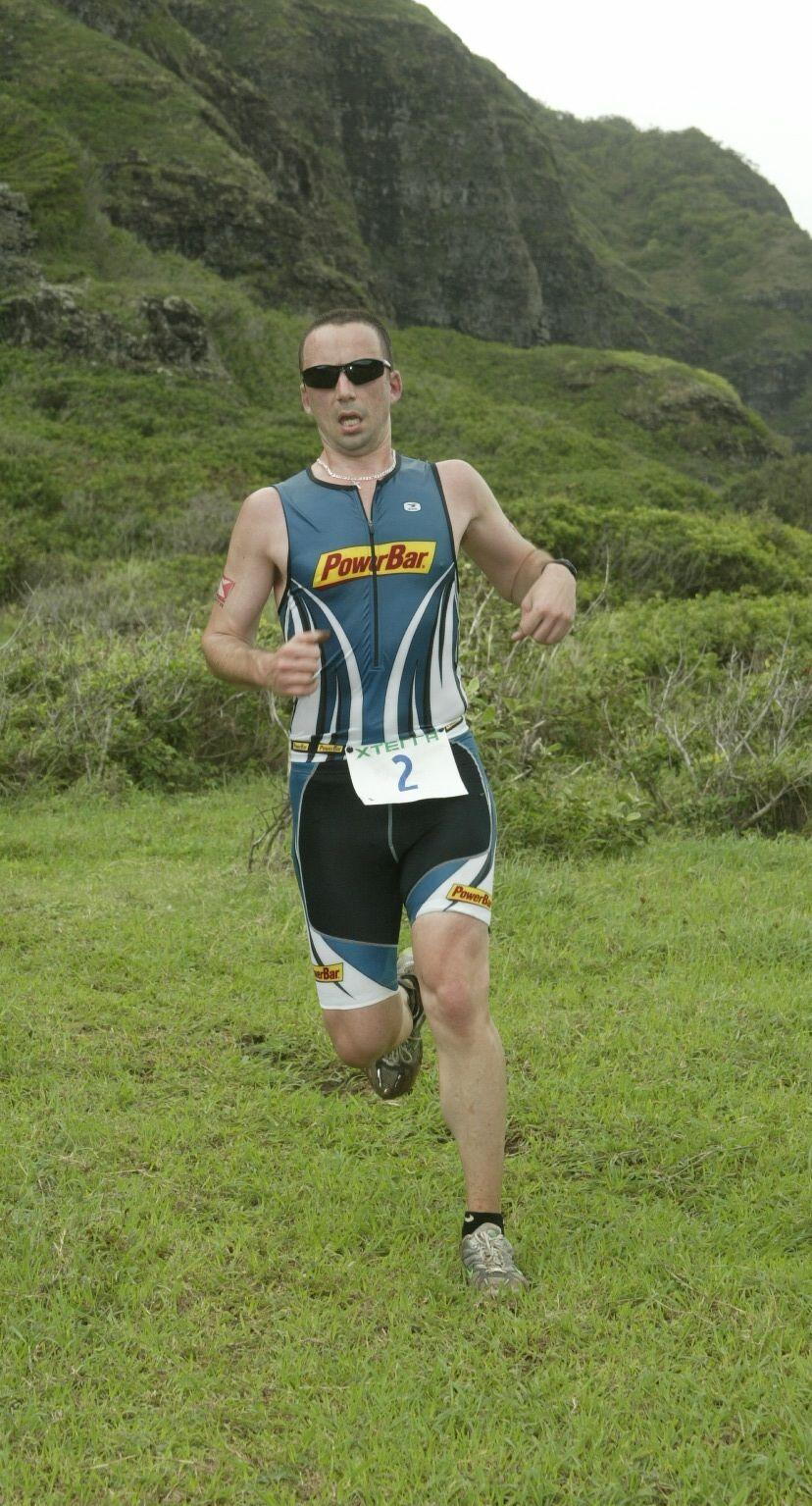
- Burgunder competing at the XTERRA Trail Running World Championship on Sunday, Dec. 7, 2008, at Kualoa Ranch on Oahu, HI.

Personal information
- Full name: Richard Paul Burgunder III
- Born: November 14, 1979 (age 46) Pittsburgh, PA
- Education: Pennsylvania State University; University of Cambridge; ITMO University; Singidunum University
- Height: 6 ft (1.83 m)
- Weight: 175 lb (79 kg)
- Website: burgunder.com

Sport
- Country: United States
- Sport: Alpine climbing, mountaineering, tower running, trail running, ultrarunning

Richard Paul Burgunder III (born 14 November 1979) is an American extreme sports athlete, adventurer, and mountaineer. Burgunder is a five-time XTERRA Trail Run Series Regional Champion and is the only runner in XTERRA Trail Run Series history to earn titles in four different regions. Burgunder has regional championship titles in New England (2009), northern Ohio (2011), Pocono (2011 and 2012), and Utah (2013). Burgunder made history in 2011 by winning XTERRA regional championships in two different regions.

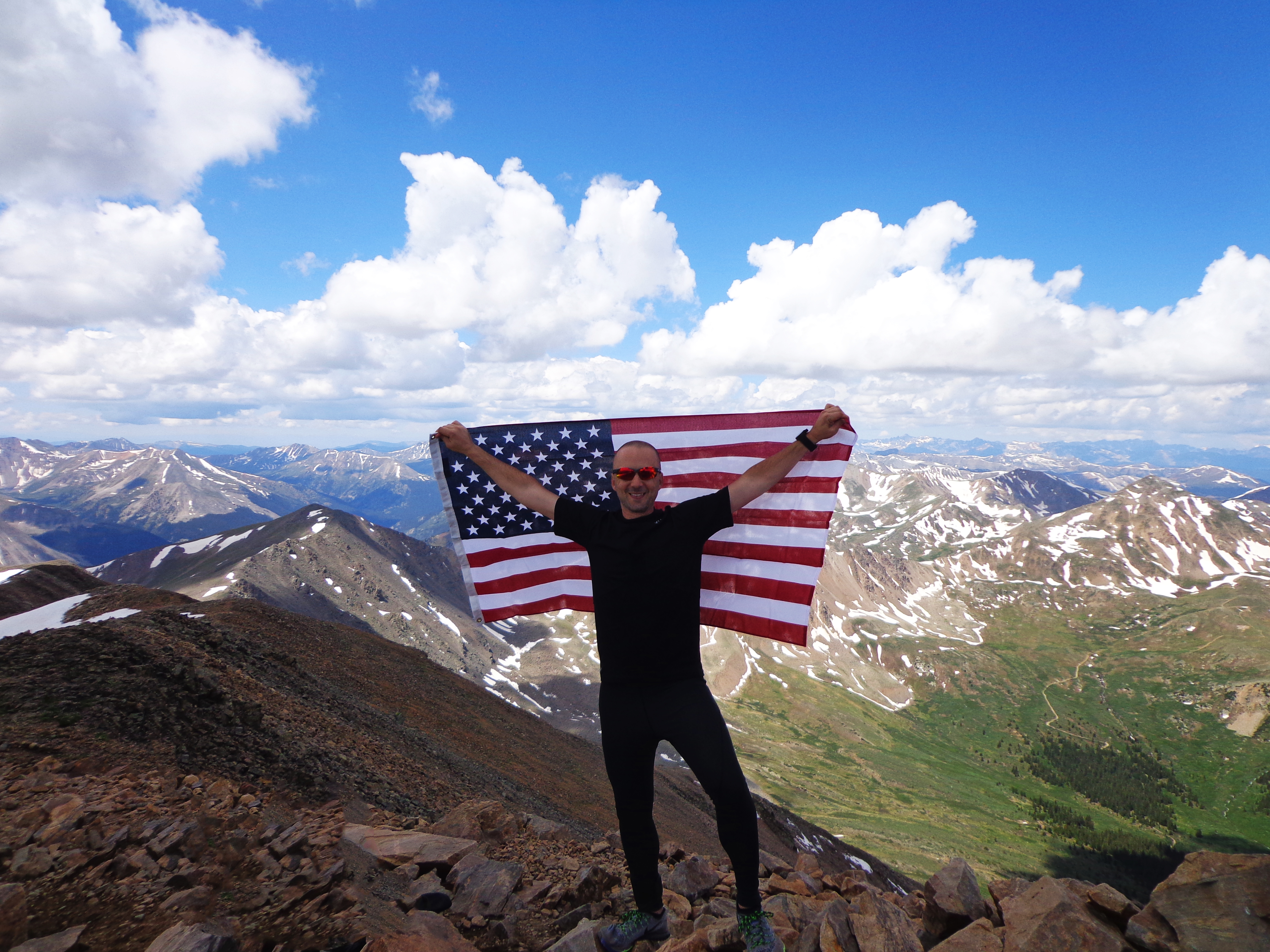
Burgunder atop Mount Elbert on Monday, July 4, 2016, in the San Isabel National Forest.

Burgunder finished 33rd at the 2008 XTERRA Trail Running World Championship, 67th at the 2009 XTERRA Trail Running World Championship, and 66th at the 2012 XTERRA Trail Running World Championship.

In addition to being a 5-time elite invitational heat competitor at the Empire State Building Run-Up (2007–2011), Burgunder won national titles for the men's 20-29 age group at the 2008 USA Trail Marathon and 50 Mile Road National Championships. Burgunder is also a two-time top ten medalist at the USA Track & Field National Championships, as he finished 6th at the 2008 USA Trail Marathon National Championships and 9th at the 2009 50 Mile Road National Championships. Burgunder finished 12th at the 2008 50 Mile Road National Championships. Burgunder was featured as one of "The Dirty Half Dozen" by Competitor magazine.

Burgunder was invited and sponsored by Standard Chartered Bank to represent the inaugural Team USA in leg one of The Greatest Race on Earth (GROE) 2007/08 held in Nairobi, Kenya. Team USA finished 28th.

Burgunder ran a 3:43:20 in his ultramarathon debut to set the record for the fastest 50k time by a 20-year-old resident of Pennsylvania at the GNC 50k in Pittsburgh on March 25, 2000.

Burgunder has summited eight of the highest peaks in the contiguous United States, Japan's Mount Fuji and Mount Shirane, Colorado's Longs Peak and Pike's Peak, New Hampshire's Mount Washington, and Yosemite National Park's Half Dome. Burgunder was the only American who finished the 2023, 2025, and 2026 International Festival Red Fox Elbrus Race at Mount Elbrus, Russia.

== Personal life ==
Burgunder is a Pittsburgh native who received a bachelor's degree in economics from the Pennsylvania State University and is a graduate of the Cambridge Security Initiative and the Department of War Studies, King's College London 2018 International Security and Intelligence Programme and Conference at Magdalene College, University of Cambridge. Additionally, Burgunder is a graduate of the Summer School in the Russian Language and Culture 2019 at ITMO University and the 2020 International Summer School in Comparative Conflict Studies at Singidunum University.
