= 2014 Great North Run =

Half marathon in Newcastle upon Tyne, England

34th Great North Run
- Venue: Newcastle-upon-Tyne, England, United Kingdom
- Date: 7 September 2014

Medalists
gold medal	Mo Farah (60:01); Mary Keitany (65:39); Jordi Madeira (43:02); Shelly Woods (50:34)

The 34th Great North Run took place on 7 September 2014 in Newcastle-upon-Tyne, England, United Kingdom with the men's and women's elite races and wheelchair races. After having been narrowly beaten by Kenenisa Bekele in 2013, Mo Farah was rooted to become the first Briton since Steve Kenyon in 1985 to win the men's race and the first in any elite race since Paula Radcliffe won the 2003 women's race. He broke the 29-year duck, helped by the absence of 2013 champion Bekele, and was only the third Briton to win the Men's Elite race.

Priscah Jeptoo, who won the 2013's women's title was also absent so Kenyan compatriot Mary Keitany won the women's marathon and broke the course record set by Radcliffe.

Britons David Weir and Shelly Woods were the defending wheelchair champions. Woods successfully defended the women's title while Spaniard Jordi Madeira became the newest men's champion. He is the first Spanish winner of the Great North Run.

The race crowned Tracey Cramond of Darlington its landmark millionth finisher. Tracey, who was running for Butterwick Hospice, was 37,396th in the race with a time of 03:02:03.

== Results ==
=== Elite races ===
Elite Men

Position	Athlete	Nationality	Time
1	Mo Farah	United Kingdom	1:00:00
2	Mike Kigen	Kenya	1:00:00
3	Stephen Kiprotich	Uganda	1:01:35
4	Tariku Bekele	Ethiopia	1:01:39
5	Thomas Ayeko	Uganda	1:02:13
6	Andy Vernon	United Kingdom	1:02:46
7	Hiroaki Sano	Japan	1:03:01
8	Paulo Roberto Paula	Brazil	1:03:58
9	Jonny Hay	United Kingdom	1:04:09
10	Masato Kikuchi	Japan	1:04:18

Elite Women

Position	Athlete	Nationality	Time
1	Mary Keitany	Kenya	1:05:39 CR
2	Gemma Steel	United Kingdom	1:08:13
3	Tiki Gelana	Ethiopia	1:08:45
4	Caroline Kilel	Kenya	1:09:10
5	Edna Kiplagat	Kenya	1:10:37
6	Polline Wanjiku	Kenya	1:10:46
7	Risa Takenaka	Japan	1:11:11
8	Charlotte Purdue	United Kingdom	1:11:43
9	Haruna Takada	Japan	1:12:20
10	Susan Partridge	United Kingdom	1:12:28

=== Wheelchair races ===
Wheelchair Men

Position	Athlete	Nationality	Time
1	Jordi Madeira	Spain	43:02
2	Simon Lawson	United Kingdom	43:06
3	Rafael Botello Jiménez	Spain	45:24
4	Mark Conway	United Kingdom	49:38
5	Matthew Clarke	United Kingdom	51:36
6	Brett Crossley	United Kingdom	52:28
7	Will Smith	United Kingdom	52:39
8	Mark Telford	United Kingdom	53:13
9	Anthony Gotts	United Kingdom	54:36
10	Jason Richards	United Kingdom	57:06

Wheelchair Women

Position	Athlete	Nationality	Time
1	Shelly Woods	United Kingdom	50:34
2	Jade Jones	United Kingdom	53:12
3	Mel Nicholls	United Kingdom	53:39
4	Martyna Snopek	Poland	1:05:12
5	Liz McTernan	United Kingdom	1:26:18
