= 2014 Tokyo Marathon =

2014 marathon race

8th Tokyo Marathon
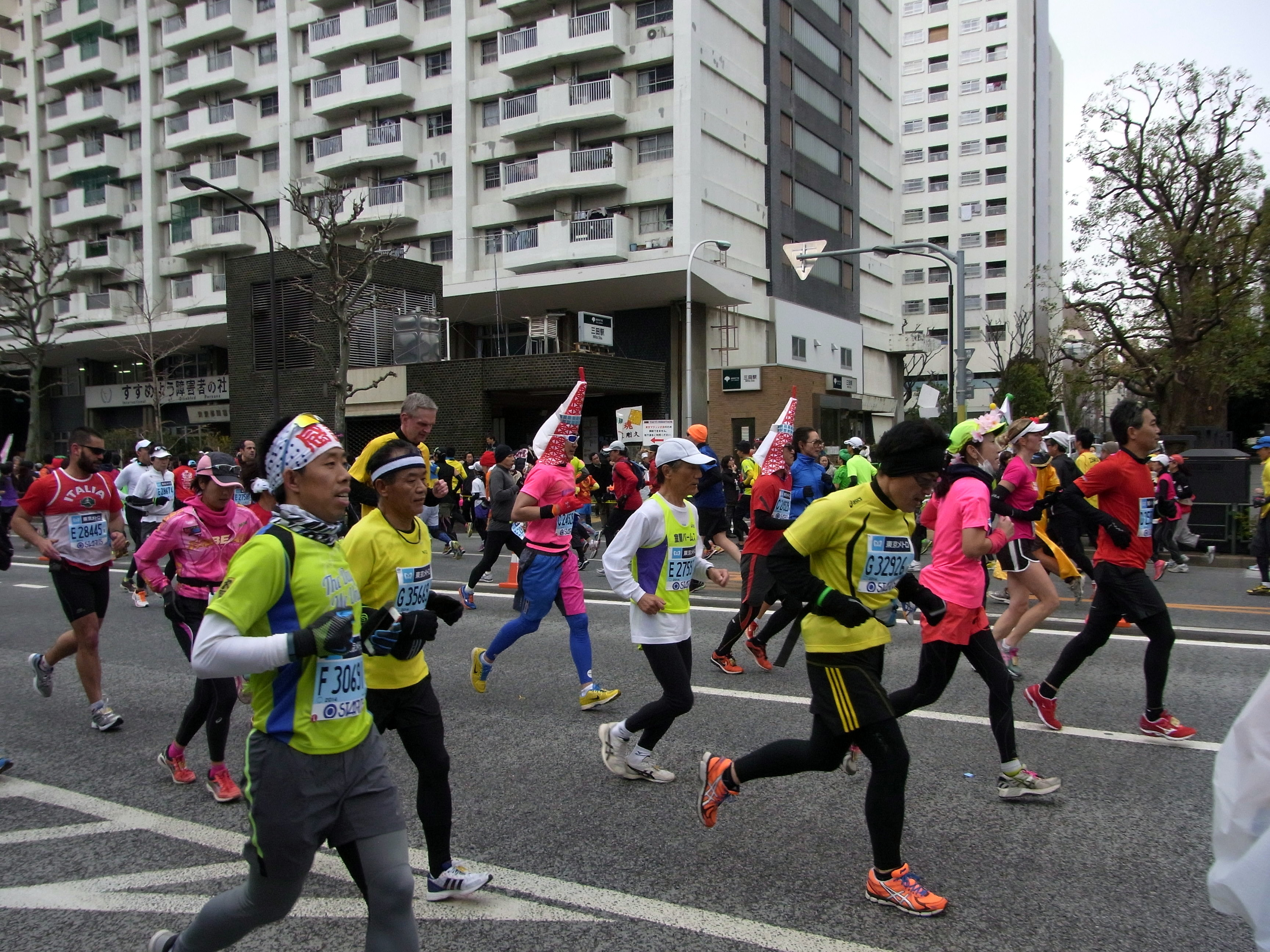
- Runners in the 2014 Tokyo Marathon mass race
- Venue: Tokyo, Japan
- Dates: 23 February

Medalists
gold medal	Dickson Chumba (2:05:42 CR); Tirfi Tsegaye (2:22:23 CR)

The 2014 Tokyo Marathon (Japanese: 東京マラソン 2014) was the eighth edition of the annual marathon race in Tokyo, Japan and was held on Sunday, 23 February. An IAAF Gold Label Road Race, it was the first World Marathon Majors event to be held that year and represented the second occasion that the Tokyo race was part of the elite-level marathon series.

Both elite race winners set new course records: Dickson Chumba ran a men's record of 2:05:42 and Tirfi Tsegaye's run of 2:22:23 was a women's record.

== Pre-race build up ==
Following on from the Tokyo Marathon's induction into the World Marathon Majors circuit, high calibre and international fields were invited for the men's and women's elite races. In the men's race, invitees included Tadese Tola (2013 world medallist), Abel Kirui (a two-time world champion), Peter Some (2013 Paris Marathon winner), Dickson Chumba (2013 Eindhoven Marathon winner), and former Tokyo champion Michael Kipyego. In total, seven of the invited men's field had personal bests faster than two hours and six minutes. Arata Fujiwara was the most prominent domestic starter.

In the women's division, Lucy Wangui Kabuu was the fastest entrant with her best of 2:19:34 hours. Second fastest was Japan's Yoko Shibui (2:19:41) although the 35-year-old was not expected to reach her past performance. A group of Ethiopian women were among the other prominent entrants, including Tirfi Tsegaye, Atsede Baysa, Birhane Dibaba and Merima Mohammed.

== Results ==
Dickson Chumba of Kenya won the men's race in a course record time of 2:05:42 hours. This also made it the fastest time ever recorded in the city, bettering Gert Thys's record of 2:06:33 set at the defunct Tokyo International Marathon. In the women's race, Ethiopia's Tirfi Tsegaye topped the podium with a course record of 2:22:23 hours – an improvement of over three minutes on the previous record. The wheelchair races had mainly domestic entrants and Hiroyuki Yamamoto and Wakako Tsuchida were the best of the men's and women's divisions, respectively.

=== Men ===
Position	Athlete	Nationality	Time
Gold medal	Dickson Chumba	Kenya	2:05:42 CR PB
Silver medal	Tadese Tola	Ethiopia	2:05:57
Bronze medal	Sammy Kitwara	Kenya	2:06:30
4	Michael Kipyego	Kenya	2:06:58
5	Peter Kimeli Some	Kenya	2:07:05
6	Geoffrey Kipsang	Kenya	2:07:37
7	Deressa Chimsa	Ethiopia	2:07:40
8	Kohei Matsumura	Japan	2:08:09 PB
9	Koji Kobayashi	Japan	2:08:51 PB
10	Abel Kirui	Kenya	2:09:04
11	Hirokatsu Kurosaki	Japan	2:09:07 PB
12	Masanori Sakai	Japan	2:09:10 PB

Other notable performers

- Cyrus Njui: 14th (2:09:35)
- Abderrahime Bouramdane: 16th (2:12:09)
- Mekubo Mogusu: 25th (2:16:43)
- Arata Fujiwara: 76th (2:30:58)
- Yared Asmerom: DNF

=== Women ===
Position	Athlete	Nationality	Time
Gold medal	Tirfi Tsegaye	Ethiopia	2:22:23 CR
Silver medal	Birhane Dibaba	Ethiopia	2:22:30 PB
Bronze medal	Lucy Wangui Kabuu	Kenya	2:24:16
4	Caroline Rotich	Kenya	2:24:35
5	Janet Rono	Kenya	2:26:03 PB
6	Albina Mayorova	Russia	2:28:18
7	Mai Ito	Japan	2:28:36
8	Rika Shintaku	Japan	2:31:15 PB
9	Manami Kamitanida	Japan	2:31:34 PB
10	Hiroko Yoshitomi	Japan	2:32:38
11	Azusa Nojiri	Japan	2:33:39
12	Atsede Baysa	Ethiopia	2:35:03

Other notable performers

- Yoko Shibui: 85th (3:11:05)
- Olena Shurkhno: DNF
- Merima Mohammed: DNF

=== Wheelchair men ===
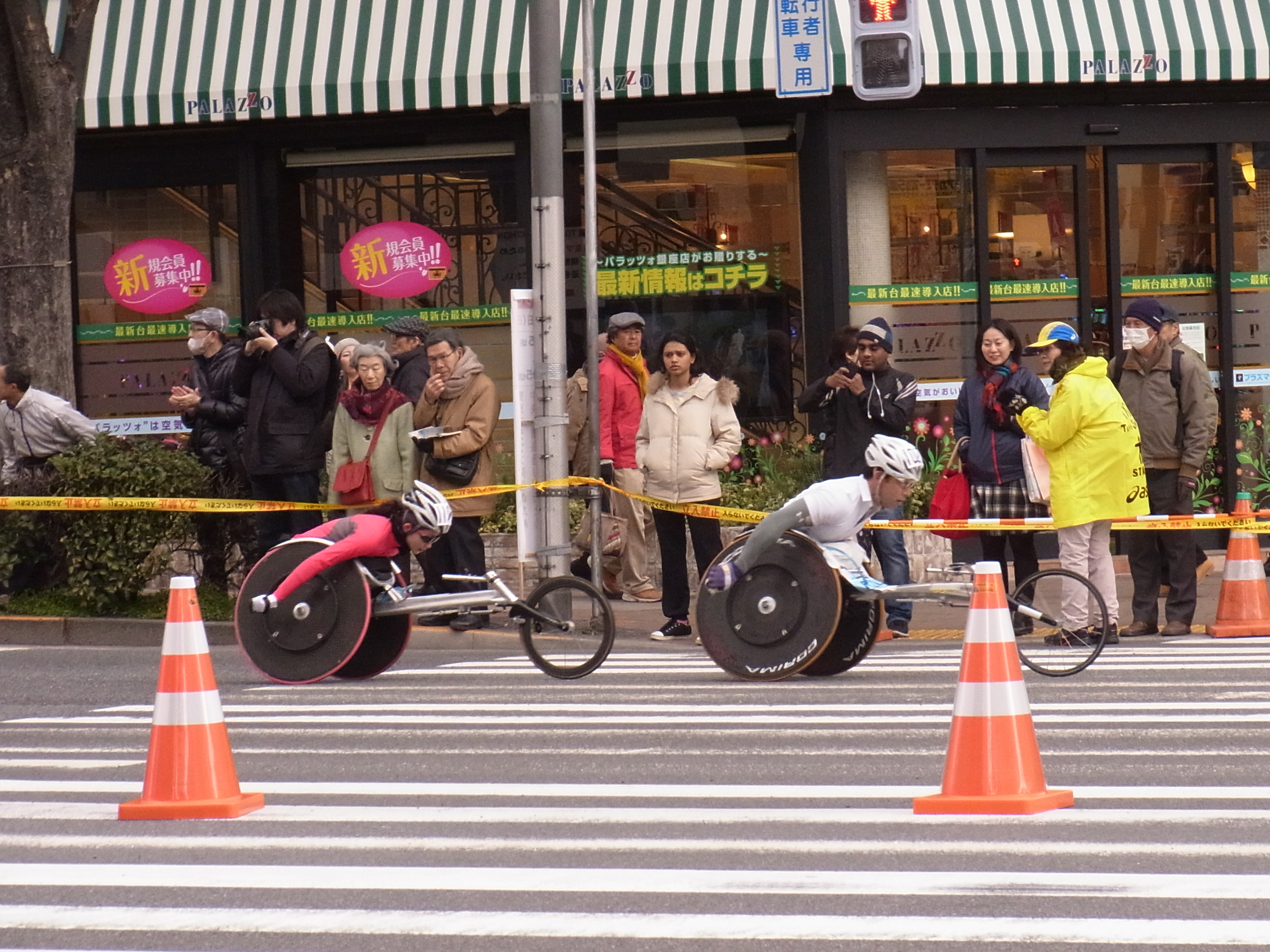
Competitors in the women's wheelchair marathon race

Position	Athlete	Nationality	Time
Gold medal	Hiroyuki Yamamoto	Japan	1:30:43
Silver medal	Soejima Masazumi	Japan	1:30:44
Bronze medal	Horano-jo Kota	Japan	1:34:45

=== Wheelchair women ===
Position	Athlete	Nationality	Time
Gold medal	Wakako Tsuchida	Japan	1:48:08
Silver medal	Kazumi Nakayama	Japan	2:04:05
Bronze medal	Koki Mizuki	Japan	2:07:35
