= 2012 Berlin Marathon =

Road running event in Berlin, Germany

39th Berlin Marathon
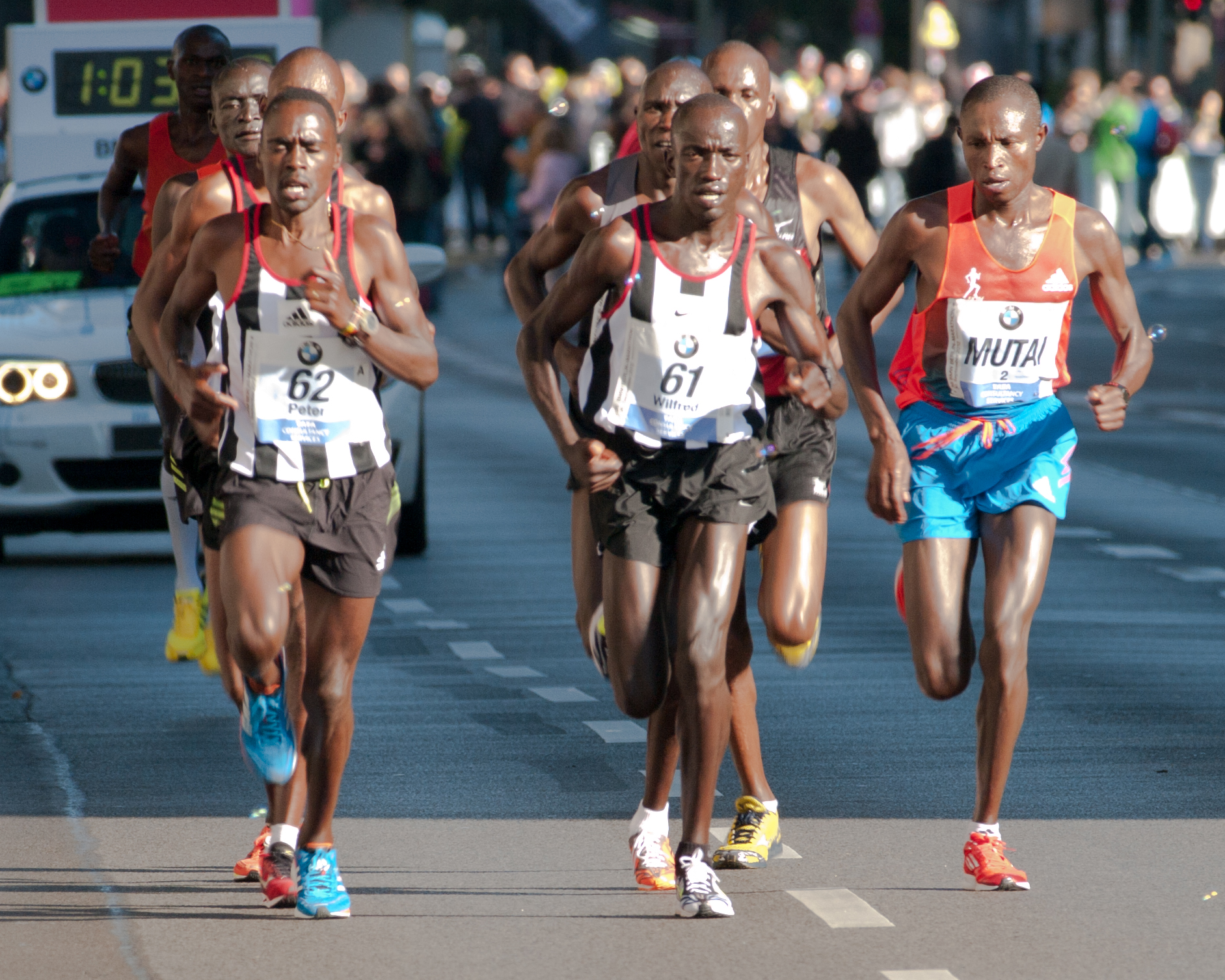
- Men's winner Geoffrey Mutai (right) running in Berlin
- Venue: Berlin, Germany
- Dates: 30 September

Champions
- Men: Geoffrey Mutai (2:04:15)
- Women: Aberu Kebede (2:20:30)

The 2012 Berlin Marathon was the 39th edition of the annual marathon event and was held on Sunday 30 September on the streets of Berlin, Germany. An IAAF Gold Label Road Race, it was the third World Marathon Majors event to be held that year. Geoffrey Mutai won the men's race in a time of 2:04:15 hours and Aberu Kebede was the women's winner in 2:20:30. A total of 34,377 people (26472 men, 7905 women) finished the marathon race.

Prior to the race, Mutai was the principal focus of men's competition and the head of an attempt to challenge Patrick Makau's world record set at the 2011 Berlin Marathon. To assist in this challenge, the organisers invited a number of his training partners, among them Dennis Kimetto, who was untested over the distance but a world record holder over 25 km. Other competitors included Geoffrey Kipsang, another marathon debutant, and Jonathan Maiyo (a sub-2:05 runner). Mizuki Noguchi's course record from 2006 was the target for the women's race, with the Ethiopia duo and training partners Aberu Kebede and Tirfi Tsegaye the leading runners.

By the halfway point of the men's race, Mutai, Kimetto, Geoffrey Kipsang and Maiyo were still in contention. Mutai pulled away from the pack, along with Kimetto, after 30 km. Kimetto remained close to the leader put never overtook him, leaving Mutai to take the title (and the World Marathon Majors jackpot) by a margin of second with his winning time of 2:04:15 hours. The times of the Kenyan pair were the fastest recorded that year and the fourth and fifth fastest ever at that point. Despite the fast times of the men's race, some reporters felt the finish to be an anti-climax – both Mutai and Kimetto slowed in the final kilometres and neither pushed the other into a sprint finish, even though they finished one second apart. The Guardian's Ross Tucker remarked that the positions seemed "pre-planned" between the training partners. Geoffrey Kipsang comfortably took third place with a time of 2:06:12 for his debut run. The top nine men were all Kenyan, with Japan's Masakazu Fujiwara rounding out the top ten places.

The women's race was also dominated by two East African training partners. Aberu Kebede (winner in 2010) and Tirfi Tsegaye were unchallenged after the halfway point. In contrast to the men's race, Aberu pulled away on her own and recorded a best of 2:20:30 hours to win (over a minute short of the course record). Runner-up Tirfi also improved her best (2:21:19) and Olena Shurkhno took third place some two minutes later with a Ukrainian record time.

Swiss athletes Marcel Hug and Sandra Graf topped the wheelchair race rankings. The in-line skating competitions were won by Ewen Fernandez and Sabine Berg, respectively.

== Results ==
=== Elite results ===
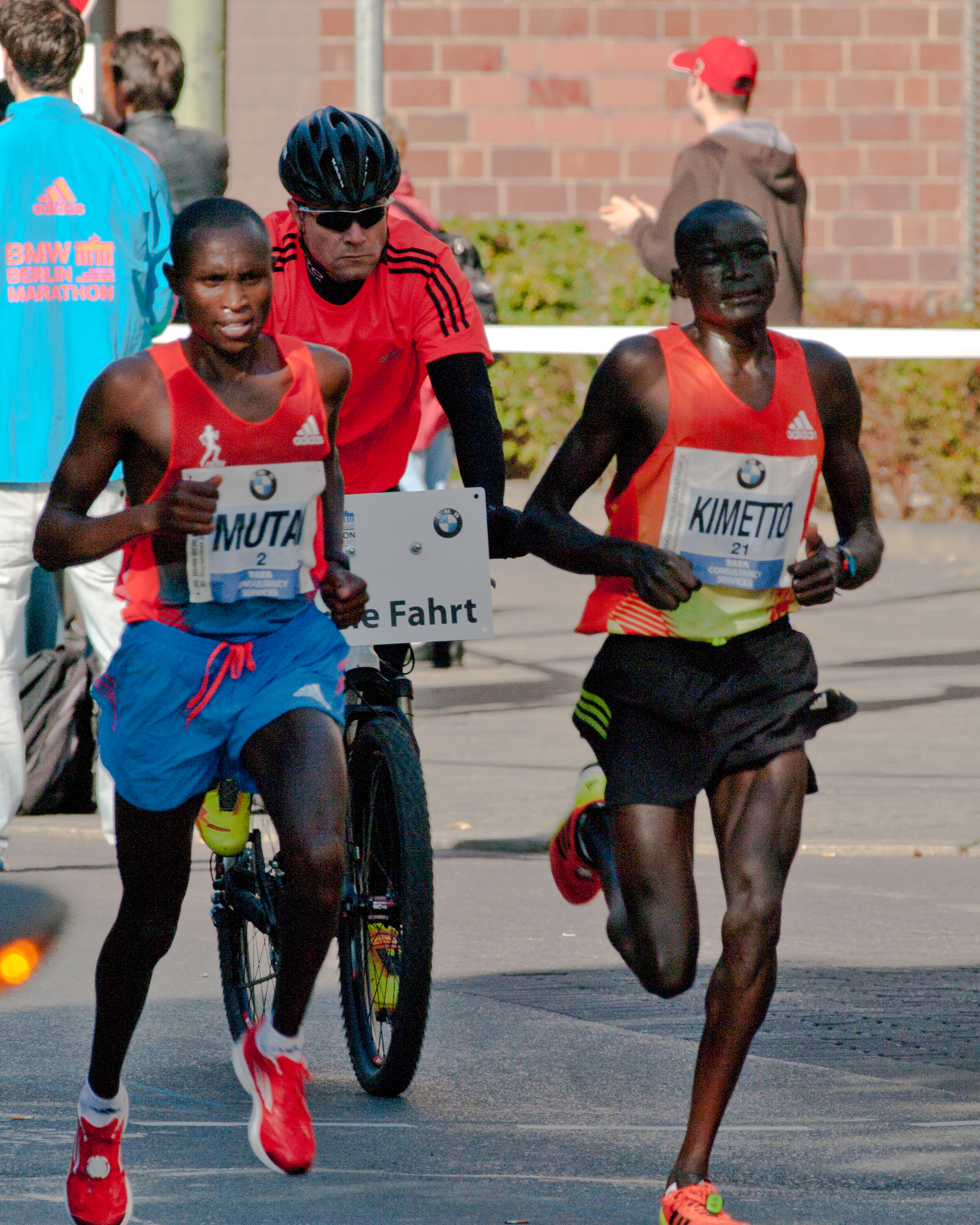
Winner Geoffrey Mutai (left) improved on his runner-up finish in Berlin in 2010.

Elite men

Position	Athlete	Nationality	Time
Gold medal	Geoffrey Mutai	Kenya	2:04:15 PB
Silver medal	Dennis Kimetto	Kenya	2:04:16 PB
Bronze medal	Geoffrey Kipsang	Kenya	2:06:12 PB
4	Nicholas Kamakya	Kenya	2:08:28
5	Josphat Keiyo	Kenya	2:08:41
6	Josphat Jepkopol	Kenya	2:08:44
7	Jonathan Maiyo	Kenya	2:09:19
8	Eliud Kiptanui	Kenya	2:09:59
9	Felix Keny	Kenya	2:10:22
10	Masakazu Fujiwara	Japan	2:11:31

Elite women

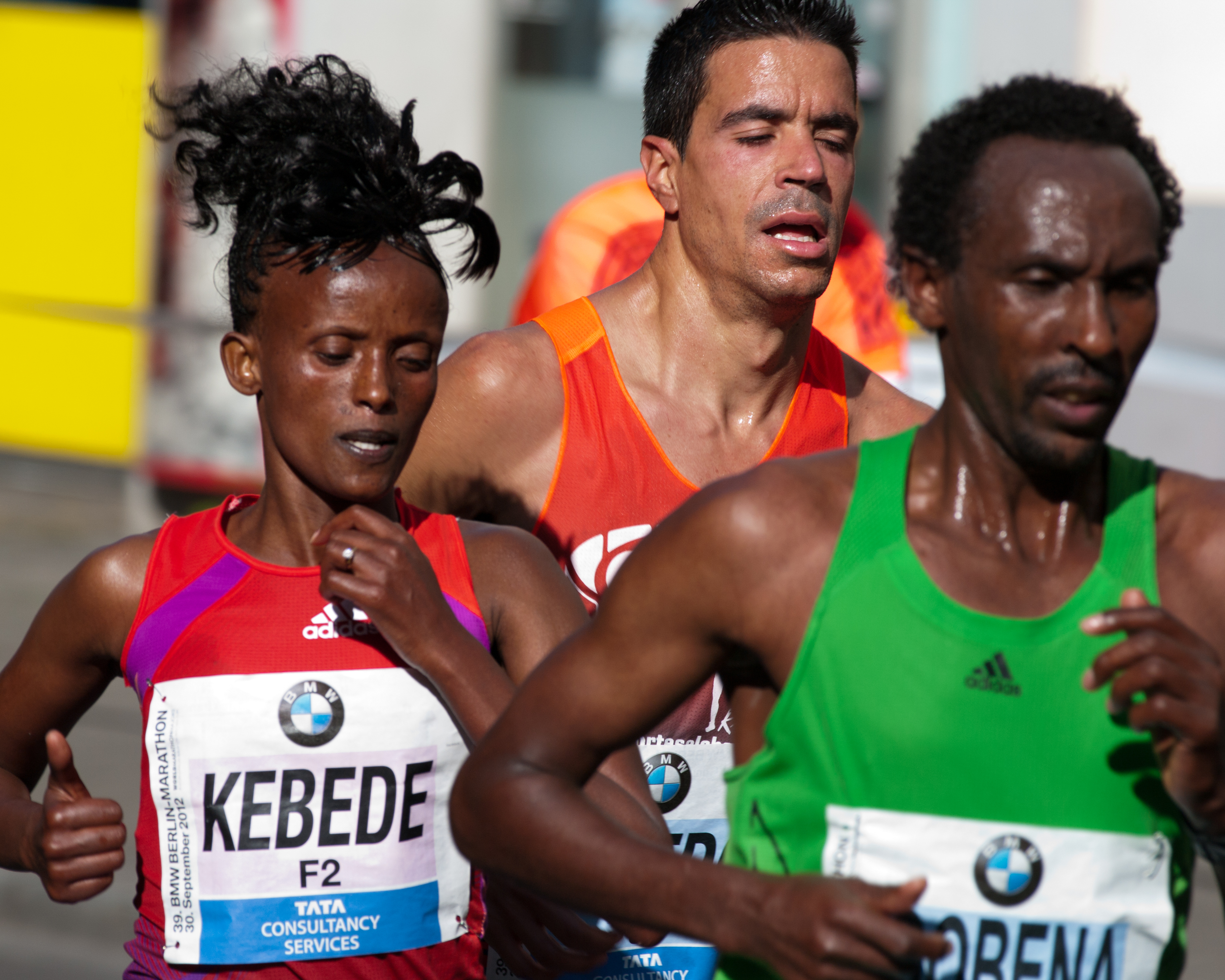
Women's winner Aberu Kebede in a group at Kilometer 37

Position	Athlete	Nationality	Time
Gold medal	Aberu Kebede	Ethiopia	2:20:30 PB
Silver medal	Tirfi Tsegaye	Ethiopia	2:21:19 PB
Bronze medal	Olena Shurkhno	Ukraine	2:23:32 NR
4	Flomena Chepchirchir	Kenya	2:24:56
5	Fate Tola	Ethiopia	2:25:14 PB
6	Alevtina Biktimirova	Russia	2:28:45
7	Caroline Chepkwony	Kenya	2:30:34 PB
8	Anna Hahner	Germany	2:30:37
9	Sonia Samuels	Great Britain	2:30:56 PB
10	Degefa Biruktayit	Ethiopia	2:33:27

=== Wheelchair ===
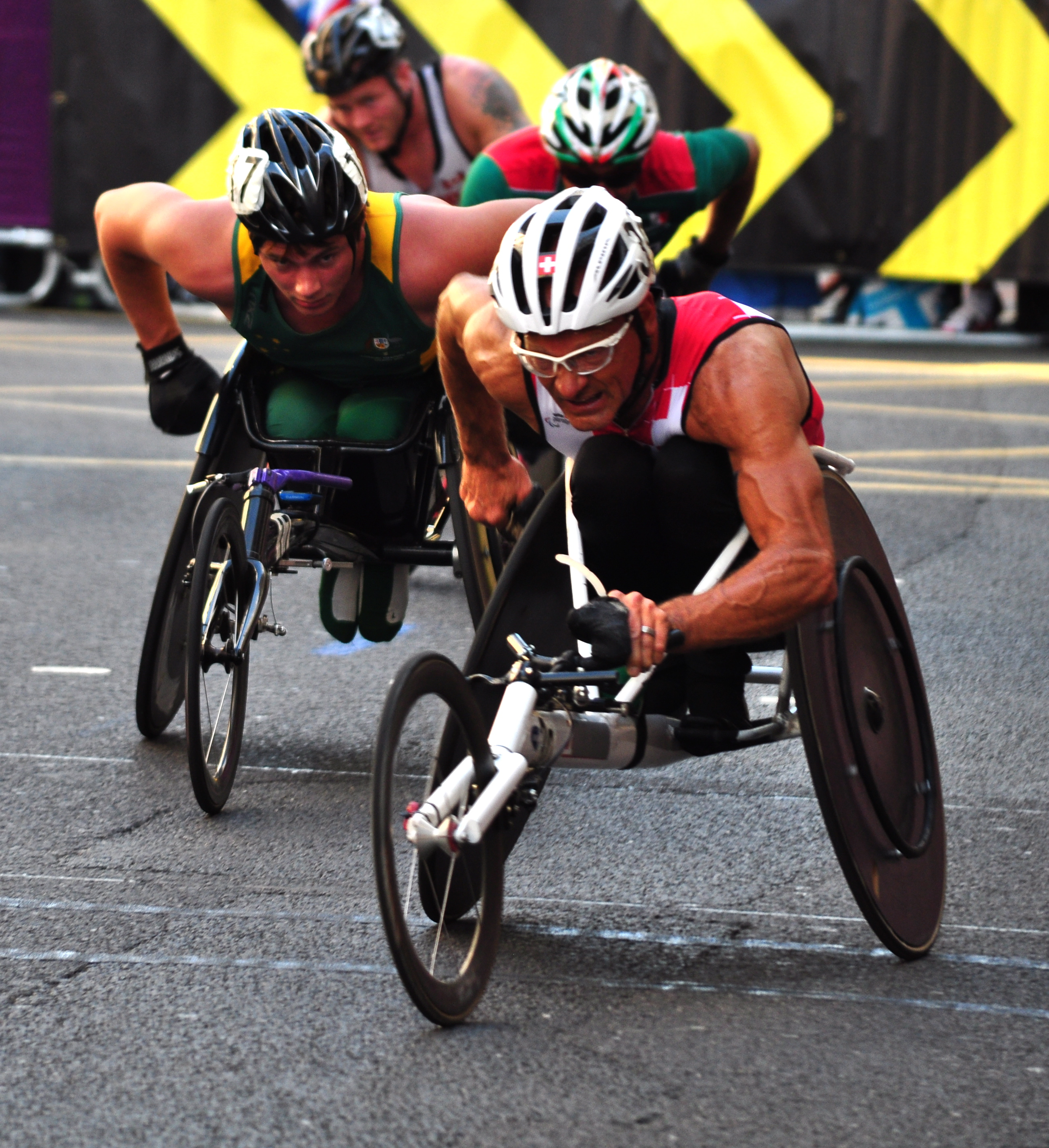
Paralympic gold medallist Heinz Frei was runner-up in the men's wheelchair race.

Men

Position	Athlete	Nationality	Time
Gold medal	Marcel Hug	Switzerland	1:29:43
Silver medal	Heinz Frei	Switzerland	1:29:48
Bronze medal	Rafael Botello Jimenez	Spain	1:32:54

Women

Position	Athlete	Nationality	Time
Gold medal	Sandra Graf	Switzerland	1:46:19
Silver medal	Francesca Porcellato	Italy	1:56:37
Bronze medal	Yvonne Sehmisch	Germany	2:06:26

=== In-line skating ===
Men

Position	Athlete	Nationality	Time
Gold medal	Ewen Fernandez	France	1:00:04
Silver medal	Bart Swings	Belgium	1:00:04
Bronze medal	Felix Rijhnen	Germany	1:02:48

Women

Position	Athlete	Nationality	Time
Gold medal	Sabine Berg	Germany	1:14:13
Silver medal	Jana Gegner	Germany	1:14:13
Bronze medal	Katja Ulbrich	Germany	1:14:13
4	Sofia D'Annibale	Italy	1:14:13
