= Birhane Dibaba =

Ethiopian long-distance runner

Personal information
- Born: 11 September 1993 (age 32)
- Height: 1.60 m (5 ft 3 in)
- Weight: 45 kg (99 lb)

Sport
- Country: Ethiopia
- Sport: Athletics
- Event: Marathon
Medal record
Gold medal – first place	2012 Valencia Marathon	Long race
Silver medal – second place	2014 Tokyo Marathon	Long race
Gold medal – first place	2015 Tokyo Marathon	Long race

Birhane Dibaba (born 11 September 1993) is an Ethiopian long-distance runner who competes in road running events. She represented Ethiopia at the 2020 Summer Olympics in the women's marathon.

== Biography ==
At the 2014 Tokyo Marathon, Birhane Dibaba ran a personal best time of 2:22:30 hours for second place, behind Ethipion teammate Tirfi Tsegaye. At the 2015 Tokyo Marathon, Birhane ran a time of 2:23:15 hours for first place. As a result of this marathon win, she was selected for the Ethiopian women's marathon team along with three other 2015 women's marathon winners at the 2015 World Championships in Athletics.

She competed in the women's marathon at the 2017 World Championships in Athletics.
