= Nicholas Manza Kamakya =

Kenyan long-distance runner

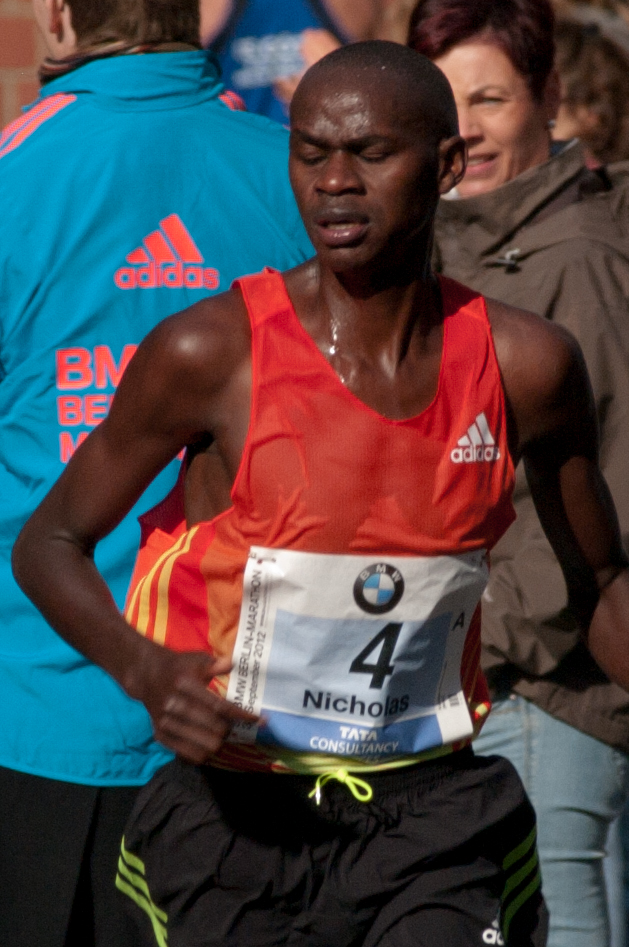
Kamakya at the Berlin Marathon 2012

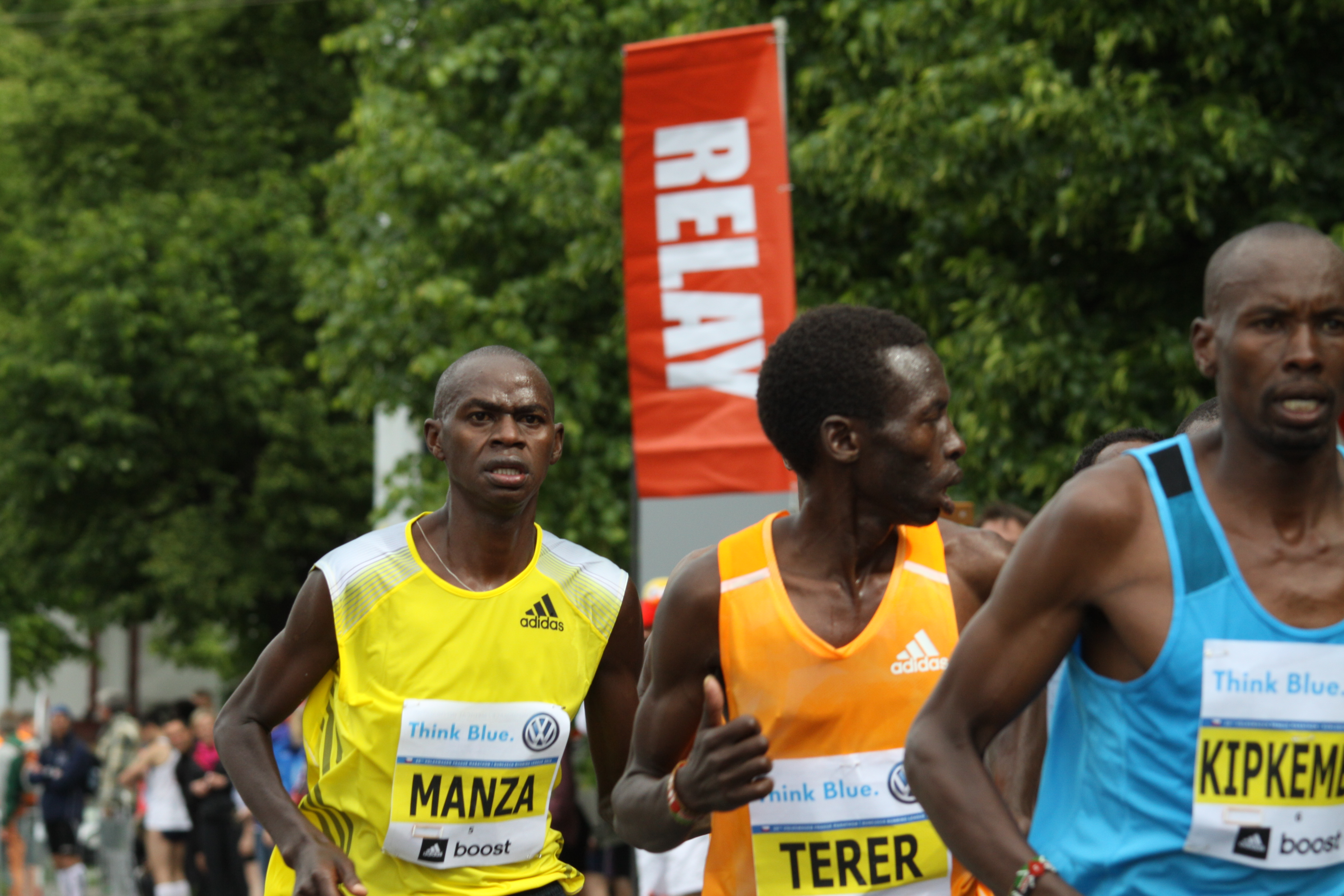
Nicholas Manza Kamakya during Prague International Marathon in 2014

Nicholas Manza Kamakya (born 1 January 1985) is a Kenyan long-distance runner who competes in road running events, including marathons.

He was the 2007 winner of the Boilermaker Road Race 15K. In 2009 he came second at the Prague Half Marathon with a personal best of 1:00:09 hours, won the Göteborgsvarvet, was second at the Beijing Marathon. and won the Montferland Run, missing Haile Gebrselassie record by only two seconds.

He ran at the 2010 Rome Marathon and finished in sixth place. In 2011, he was the runner-up at the Los Angeles Marathon, ending the race with a time of 2:09:26, which was almost three minutes after the race winner Markos Geneti. Manza won the Gold Coast Marathon in 2011, with a new race record of 2:10:01. He improved his personal best time to 2:06:34 hours at the 2011 Amsterdam Marathon, finishing in fourth place. He entered the 2011 Honolulu Marathon, but withdrew early on in the race due to pain in his Achilles tendon. He ran at the Lake Biwa Marathon in March 2012, but did not finish this race either. At run of 2:08:28 brought him fourth place at the 2012 Berlin Marathon.

== Personal bests ==
- 5000 metres - 13:30.81 min (2004)
- 10,000 metres - 28:16.77 min (2008)
- Half marathon - 1:00:09 hrs (2009)
- Marathon - 2:06:34 hrs (2009)
