= 2013 Tokyo Marathon =

7th Tokyo Marathon
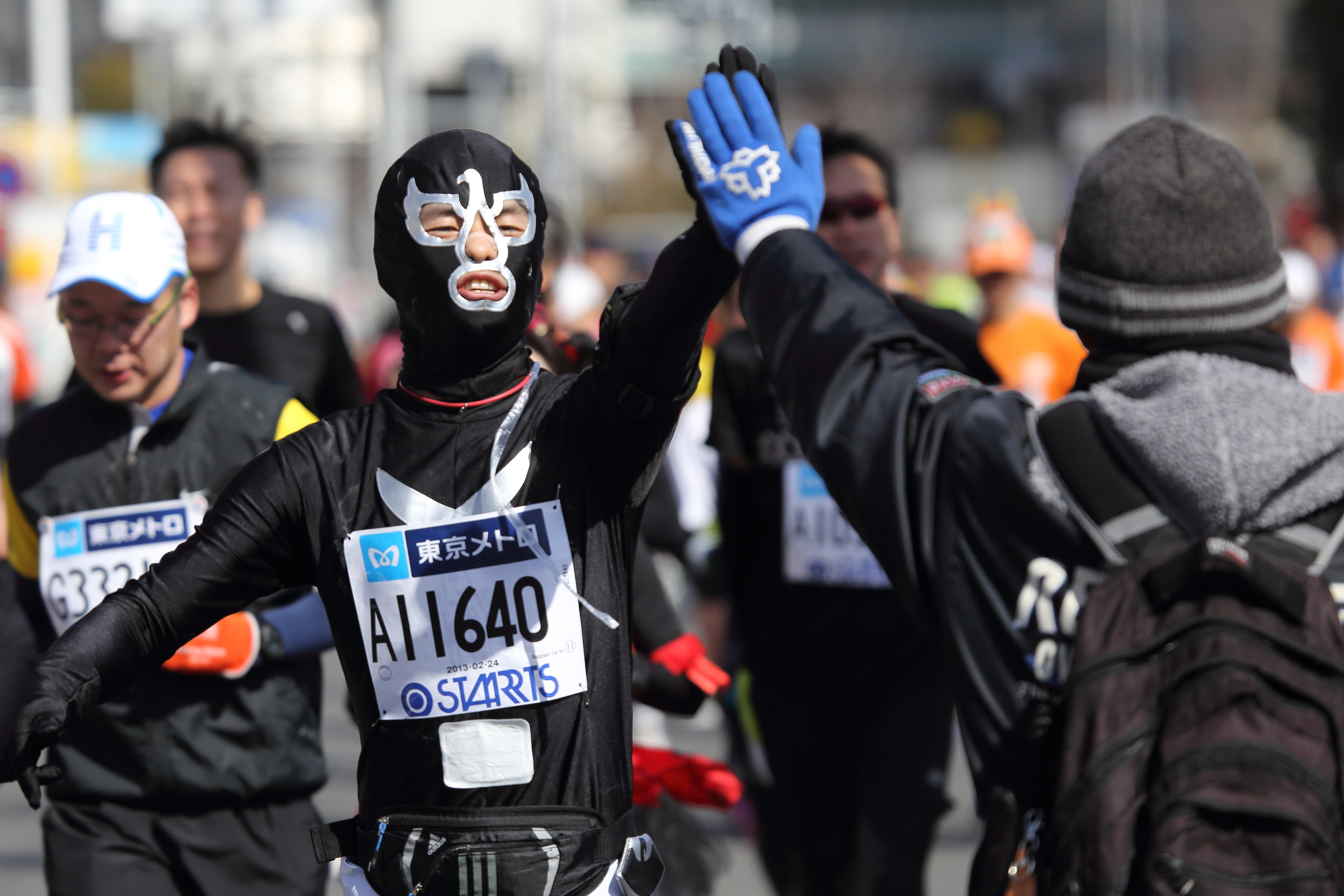
- Costumed fun runners at the 2013 race
- Venue: Tokyo, Japan
- Dates: 24 February

Medalists
gold medal	Dennis Kimetto (2:06:50 CR); Aberu Kebede (2:25:34)

The 2013 Tokyo Marathon (Japanese: 東京マラソン 2013) was the seventh edition of the annual marathon race in Tokyo, Japan and was held on Sunday, 24 February. An IAAF Gold Label Road Race, it was the first World Marathon Majors event to be held that year and represented the first occasion that the Tokyo race was part of the elite-level marathon series.

The 2013 Tokyo Marathon featured marathon races for runners and wheelchair racers. A 10-kilometre race was also held for disabled people and runners under eighteen years.

Dennis Kimetto won the men's race in a course record time of 2:06:50 hours. The women's winner, Aberu Kebede, had a time of 2:25:34 hours, which was six seconds off the women's course best. The mass races set a new participation record with a total of 28,721 runners entering the race over 42.195 kilometres (26 miles and 385 yards), and 36,676 people taking part in the day's races as a whole.

== Pre-race build up ==
A day prior to the race, the International Friendship Run was held with a distance of roughly 4 km. The non-competitive race between athletes, organisers and registered marathon entrants began with warm-up radio exercises and took place in Shiokaze Park and Odaiba Seaside Park. The 2013 Tokyo Marathon EXPO was also hosted that day. Organisational changes improved the charity fun running aspect of the race: 3000 entries were reserved for charity runners, tax relief was given to charitable donations, and role of sponsors and corporations in raising funds was expanded. An estimated 1.7 million people were spectators to the city race.

Building on the race's inclusion with the World Marathon Majors circuit, race director Tadaaki Hayano invited numerous elite international marathon runners with fast personal bests. In the men's race Dennis Kimetto, James Kwambai, Dino Sefir, and Jonathan Maiyo all entered the race with personal bests below two hours and five minutes – a first for a Japanese race. Irina Mikitenko was the fastest entrant among the elite women, following by Bezunesh Bekele, Aberu Kebede and Caroline Kilel.

The men's race was also of domestic interest because it doubled as the trials for the Japanese men's marathon team at the 2013 World Championships in Athletics. Arata Fujiwara, Kazuhiro Maeda, Yoshinori Oda and Takayuki Matsumiya were the foremost Japanese men, all having bests below two hours and ten minutes. Yoshimi Ozaki and Azusa Nojiri were the most prominent female domestic entrants.

== Results ==
=== Men ===
Position	Athlete	Nationality	Time
Gold medal	Dennis Kimetto	Kenya	2:06:50 CR
Silver medal	Michael Kipyego	Kenya	2:06:58
Bronze medal	Bernard Kipyego	Kenya	2:07:53
4	Kazuhiro Maeda	Japan	2:07:59
5	James Kwambai	Kenya	2:08:02
6	Gilbert Kirwa	Kenya	2:08:17
7	Feyisa Bekele	Ethiopia	2:09:05
8	Dino Sefir	Ethiopia	2:09:13
9	Takayuki Matsumiya	Japan	2:09:14
10	Jonathan Maiyo	Kenya	2:10:18

=== Women ===
Position	Athlete	Nationality	Time
Gold medal	Aberu Kebede	Ethiopia	2:25:34
Silver medal	Yeshi Esayias	Ethiopia	2:26:01
Bronze medal	Irina Mikitenko	Germany	2:26:41
4	Albina Mayorova	Russia	2:26:51
5	Yoshimi Ozaki	Japan	2:28:30
6	Helalia Johannes	Namibia	2:29:20
7	Mika Yoshikawa	Japan	2:30:20
8	Nastassia Staravoitava	Bulgaria	2:30:45
9	Azusa Nojiri	Japan	2:31:15
10	Hiroko Yoshitomi	Japan	2:31:28
