= Manami Kamitanida =

Japanese marathon runner

Manami Kamitanida (Japanese: 上谷田 愛美; born 21 December 1989) is a Japanese long-distance runner who competes in marathon races.

At the 2014 Tokyo Marathon she finished in 9th place.

At the 2015 Gold Coast Marathon she finished in 3rd place behind Risa Takenaka and Keiko Nogami.
