= Jonathan Kiplimo Maiyo =

Kenyan long-distance runner (born 1988)

Medal record

Men's athletics

Representing Kenya

African Championships
Silver medal – second place	2012 Porto-Novo	5000 m

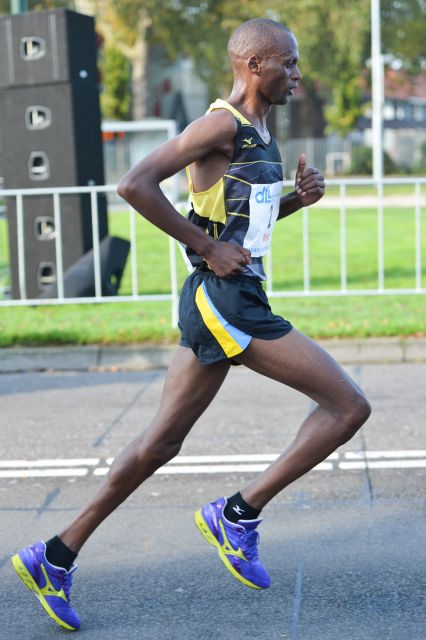
Maiyo during Eindhoven Marathon 2014

Jonathan Kiplimo Maiyo (born 5 May 1988) is a Kenyan long-distance runner who competes in half marathon and marathon events. His personal bests of 59:02 minutes and 2:04:56 hours, respectively, ranks him in the top twenty all-time in both events. He was also the silver medallist over 5000 metres at the 2012 African Championships in Athletics.

Originally a pacemaker, he helped Haile Gebrselassie to a marathon world record in 2008. He entered marathons competitively from 2009 onwards and placed in the top ten at the 2012 Berlin Marathon and 2013 Tokyo Marathon. Despite his fast personal best, his best finish for the distance is fourth, achieved at the 2012 Dubai Marathon. He has won half marathons in Breda and Zwolle.

== Career ==
Maiyo made his debut on the European road running circuit in 2007. He opened with a half marathon debut of 61:38 minutes for second place at the Paderborn Easter Run and followed this with an improvement to 60:10 minutes, set during a fifth-place finish at the Rotterdam Half Marathon. That October he won the Bredase Singelloop, was runner-up at the 20K de Paris and came third at the Great South Run 10-miler. He showed a talent for pacemaking that year: he helped pace Haile Gebrselassie to a marathon world record at the Berlin Marathon and also served that capacity at the top level Fukuoka Marathon.

The following year he repeated as second-placer in Paderborn, but was only eleventh at the higher calibre Berlin Half Marathon. He came close to a personal best on his return to Rotterdam, running 60:12 minutes, but this race proved to be among the fastest ever – six runners went faster than an hour and Maiyo's time was the fastest ever recorded for a tenth-place finisher. He again acted as pacer at the Fukuoka Marathon in December, where he led the pack to the halfway point.

In 2009 Maiyo attempted his first ever competitive marathon at the Vienna City Marathon in April, but he dropped out at the 27 km mark. However, he established himself as a world class runner at the Rotterdam Half Marathon – he placed second with a time of 59:08 minutes. This ranked him fourth globally in the event that year, and moving him up to eighth on the all-time lists at that point. He performed poorly at the 2010 Zayed International Half Marathon, finishing outside the top twenty, but managed to complete the full distance at the Rotterdam Marathon with an eleventh-place finish in 2:12:45 hours. His 2011 season was relatively low key, with just two major outings: fourth at the Yangzhou Jianzhen International Half Marathon and runner-up at the Great North Run.

A change of coach towards the end of 2011 coincided with a return to form for Maiyo. He moved in with fellow runner Abel Kirui (a marathon world champion) and training with Italian coach Renato Canova's group. The 2012 season saw several significant breakthroughs for Maiyo. At the Dubai Marathon he ran a time of 2:04:56 hours to enter at tenth on the all-time lists for the event, but such was the strength in depth this only brought him fourth place at the high-prize money race. That March he moved up to ninth on the all-time lists for the half marathon, running a time of 59:02 minutes as runner-up at the CPC Loop. His first international medal came not on the road, but in track running. He was 5000 metres runner-up at the Kenyan Athletics Championships and chosen to run for Kenya at the 2012 African Championships in Athletics. There he ran a personal best of 13:22.89 minutes to take the silver medal in a Kenyan medal sweep with Mark Kiptoo and Timothy Kosgei Kiptoo.

He was one of the fastest entrants at the 2012 Berlin Marathon in September, but fell away from the lead pack and ended in seventh place (2:09:19 hours). A similar fate befell him at the 2013 Tokyo Marathon in February, at which he faded to finish in 2:10:18 hours for tenth overall. He skipped the rest of the season and on his return won the 2014 Zwolle Half Marathon.

== Personal bests ==
- 5000 metres – 13:22.89 min (2012)
- 10K run – 29:20 min (2008)
- 10 miles – 45:33 min (2010)
- 20K run – 58:08 min (2007)
- Half marathon – 59:02 min (2012)
- Marathon – 2:04:56 hrs (2012)

== International competition record ==
Year	Competition	Venue	Position	Event	Notes
2012	African Championships	Porto-Novo, Benin	2nd	5000 metres	13:22.89 min
