= Tomo Morimoto =

Japanese long-distance runner

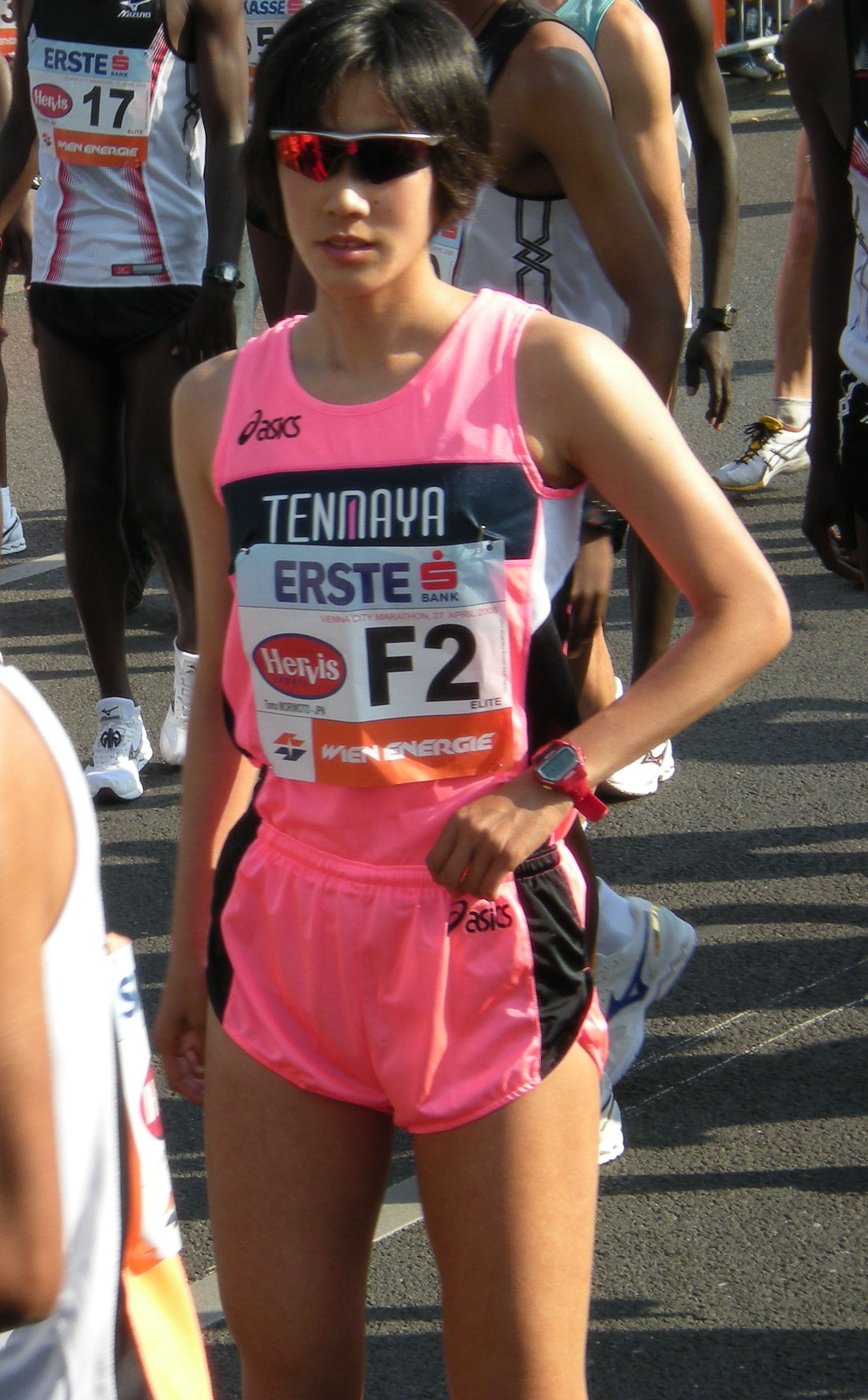
Tomo Morimoto at 2008 Vienna City Marathon

Tomo Morimoto (森本 友, Morimoto Tomo; born December 27, 1983) is a female long-distance runner from Japan who specialises in the marathon.

Born in Yamasaki, Hyōgo, Morimoto made her marathon debut at the 2006 Osaka Women's Marathon and, even though she was not an invited elite runner, she managed to finish in fifth place in a time of 2:27:46. She set her personal best (2:24:33) in the women's marathon on May 7, 2006, winning the Vienna City Marathon. This was the race's second fastest run for a woman at that point after Maura Viceconte's course record.

She formed part of the Okayama team for the Inter-Prefectural Women's Ekiden in January 2008 and her 4 km leg helped the team to third place in the relay race. She hoped to be selected for the 2008 Summer Olympics and began her marathon season by running 2:25:34 for second place at the Osaka Marathon. She was also runner-up at the Vienna Marathon that year, finishing behind Luminița Talpoș who defended her title. She missed out on a place in the Japanese squad for the 2008 Summer Olympics as the selectors preferred to pick Yurika Nakamura.

She signed up for the 2009 London Marathon and finished in eighth place with a time of 2:26:29 – the best performance by an Asian woman at the event. At the Berlin Marathon in September 2010 she was among the race favourites and took third place with a time of 2:26:10 behind Ethiopians Aberu Kebede and Bezunesh Bekele.
