= Keiko Nogami (runner) =

Japanese long-distance runner

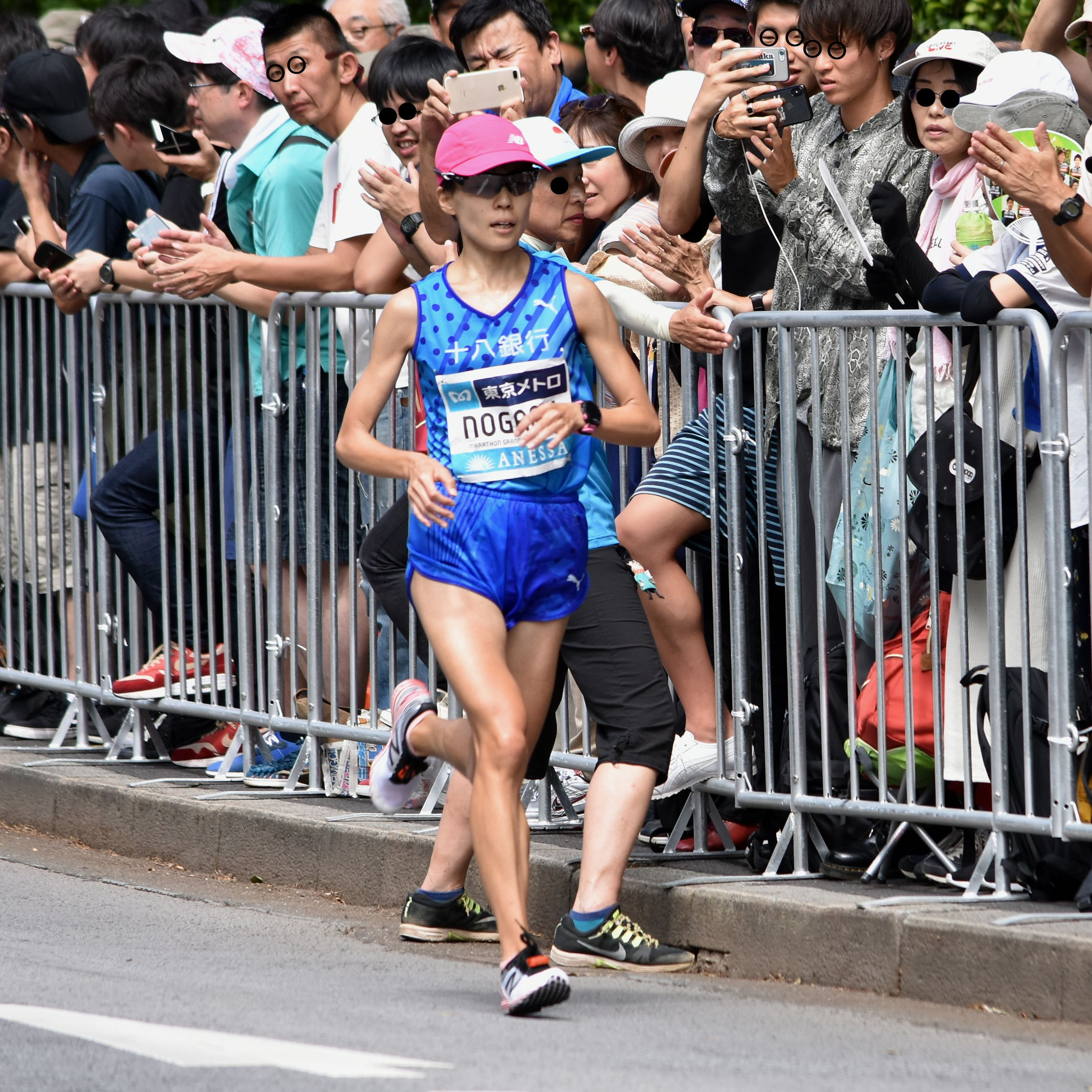
Keiko Nogame 190915

Keiko Nogami (野上 恵子, Nogami Keiko; born December 6, 1985 in Ono, Hyōgo) is a Japanese long-distance runner who competes in marathon races. Nogami took second at the 2015 Gold Coast Marathon, losing first place to Risa Takenaka and defeating third place finisher Manami Kamitanida.
