= Dennis Kipruto Kimetto =

Kenyan long-distance runner

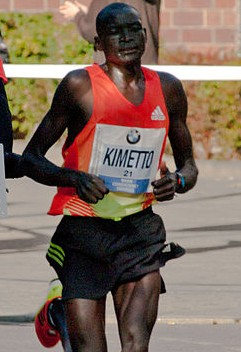
- Kimetto at the 2012 Berlin Marathon

Personal information
- Nationality: Kenyan
- Born: 22 January 1984 (age 42)
- Height: 1.71 m (5 ft 7 in)
- Weight: 55 kg (121 lb)

Sport
- Country: Kenya
- Sport: Athletics
- Event: Long-distance running

Dennis Kipruto Kimetto (born 22 January 1984) is a Kenyan long-distance runner who competes in road running events. He was the world record holder in the men's marathon with a time of 2 hours 2 minutes 57 seconds, a record which he held until Eliud Kipchoge broke it in 2018 with a time of 2:01:39.

== Career ==
Hailing from Eldoret and part of a training group including Geoffrey Mutai, Kimetto's first major win came in the half marathon section of the Nairobi Marathon in 2011. Running as Dennis Koech, he topped the podium in a time of 1:01:30. He quickly rose into the global running elite in his first outings outside of Kenya. At the RAK Half Marathon he defeated a field including Wilson Kipsang Kiprotich to win the race in 60:40 minutes. His age was misreported as ten years younger, and his following run of 59:14 minutes to win the Berlin Half Marathon in April was briefly considered a world junior best. An erroneous passport was the cause of both the age difference and the Koech misnomer, his surname actually being Kimetto. This was rectified in later competitions.

With Kimetto's personal data corrected, he went on to break his first major record at the BIG 25 Berlin. His time of 71:18 for 25 kilometres knocked a sizeable margin off Sammy Kosgei's world record of 71:50. After this he made the fastest marathon debut in history that September. Again in Berlin, he ran alongside Geoffrey Mutai for much of the race as he recorded a time of 2:04:16, one second behind Mutai, to set the fifth fastest time ever run at that point. Some reporters observed that Kimetto stayed solidly behind the more prominent Mutai in the final section of the race and concluded that he allowed his partner to take the victory which clinched a World Marathon Majors series title for Mutai.

In 2013 Kimetto set two World Marathon Majors course records, at Tokyo in 2:06:50 (since bettered) and at Chicago in 2:03:45, the fastest time ever on American soil for a record quality course. On 28 September 2014, Kimetto broke the world record at the Berlin Marathon with 2:02:57 and became the first man to run under 2:03. His 5-kilometre splits were recorded as 14:42, 14:42, 14:46, 14:26, 14:32, 14:30, 14:09, 14:42. His second half of 1:01:12 was the fastest in history excluding those from the downhill and greatly wind-aided 2011 Boston Marathon.

His 2015 season wasn't as impressive as he only completed the London Marathon, finishing third, failing to complete the IAAF World Championships marathon in Beijing in August as well as the Fukuoka Marathon in December where he stopped at the 5-kilometre mark after dropping off the pace at 2 kilometres due to an injury. After finishing ninth at the 2016 London Marathon, Kimetto removed himself from consideration for the Rio Olympics, intending instead to run in the Chicago Marathon. However, he pulled out ahead of the race, citing a stress fracture in his left leg.

Kimetto's injury problems continued in 2017, with a knee injury forcing him to withdraw from the field for the Boston Marathon. He failed to finish both the Chicago Marathon in October and the Honolulu Marathon in December.

At the Vienna City Marathon in April 2018 Kimetto dropped out before the 25-kilometre point.

Kimetto grew up in a rural farming community. "I think what really motivates me to be a fighter is the fact that I come from a humble background," Kimetto says. "I try to really make sure that I achieve my best so that I can assist my family."

== Achievements ==
- All results regarding marathon and half marathon

Year	Competition	Venue	Position	Notes
Representing Kenya
2011	Nairobi Half Marathon	Nairobi, Kenya	1st	1:01:30
2011	RAK Half Marathon	Dubai, United Arab Emirates	1st	1:00:40
2012	Berlin Half Marathon	Berlin, Germany	1st	59:14
2012	BIG 25 Berlin	Berlin, Germany	1st	1:11:18
2012	Berlin Marathon	Berlin, Germany	2nd	2:04:16
2013	Tokyo Marathon	Tokyo, Japan	1st	2:06:50
2013	Chicago Marathon	Chicago, United States	1st	2:03:45
2014	Berlin Marathon	Berlin, Germany	1st	2:02:57 (WR)
2015	London Marathon	London, England	3rd	2:05:50
2016	London Marathon	London, England	9th	2:11:44
2018	Shanghai International Marathon	Shanghai, China	10th	2:14:54

World Marathon Majors results timeline
World Marathon Majors	2012	2013	2014	2015	2016
Tokyo Marathon	-	1st	-	-	-
Boston Marathon	-	-	-	-	-
London Marathon	-	-	-	3rd	9th
Berlin Marathon	2nd	-	1st	-	-
Chicago Marathon	-	1st	-	-	-
New York City Marathon	-	-	-	-	-

Records
Preceded by (Kenya) Wilson Kipsang	Men's Marathon World Record Holder; 28 September 2014 – 16 September 2018	Succeeded by (Kenya) Eliud Kipchoge
