= 2012 African Championships in Athletics – Men's 5000 metres =

The men's 5000 metres at the 2012 African Championships in Athletics was held at the Stade Charles de Gaulle on 1 July.

== Medalists ==
Gold	Mark Kiptoo; Kenya
Silver	Jonathan Maiyo; Kenya
Bronze	Timothy Kosgei Kiptoo; Kenya

== Records ==
Standing records prior to the 2012 African Championships in Athletics
World record	Kenenisa Bekele (ETH)	12:37.35	Hengelo, Netherlands	31 May 2004
African record	Kenenisa Bekele (ETH)	12:37.35	Hengelo, Netherlands	31 May 2004
Championship record	Simon Chemoiywo (KEN)	13:09.68	Durban, South Africa	27 June 1993

== Schedule ==
Date	Time	Round
1 July 2012	16:55	Final

== Results ==
=== Final ===
Rank	Name	Nationality	Time	Note
1st place, gold medalist(s)	Mark Kiptoo	Kenya	13:22.38	
2nd place, silver medalist(s)	Jonathan Maiyo	Kenya	13:22.89	
3rd place, bronze medalist(s)	Timothy Kosgei Kiptoo	Kenya	13:24.67	
4	Tolossa Gedefa	Ethiopia	13:33.96	
5	Olivier Irabaruta	Burundi	13:43.03	
6	Vianney Ndiho	Burundi	13:51.96	
7	Elroy Gelant	South Africa	13:54.93	
8	Ytaya Atnafu	Ethiopia	13:58.69	
9	Tiruneh Biresaw	Ethiopia	13:59.16	
10	Cyriaqu Ndayikengurukiye	Rwanda	13:59.94	
11	Abdelghani Bensaadi	Algeria	14:10.90	
12	Gladwin Mzazi	South Africa	14:19.49	
13	Geoffrey Kusuro	Uganda	14:22.96	
14	Ibrahim Ismael	Djibouti	14:36.31	
15	Nikabou Dalouba	Togo	15:05.88	
16	Mahamane Tassiau Ganda	Niger	15:10.10	
17	Mohamed Tabe Bio	Benin	15:19.69	
18	Salah Abd Hamid	Libya	15:31.33	
19	Abderahim Omar	Libya	15:34.52	
	Abdenacer Fathi	Morocco	DNF	
	Dawit Wedeslasie	Eritrea	DNS	
	Seth Nyamaa-Boadi	Ghana	DNS	
	Damien Chopa	Tanzania	DNS	
