= Nairobi Marathon =

Annual road running competition

- Date: October
- Location: Nairobi, Kenya
- Event type: Road
- Distance: Marathon, Half marathon
- Primary sponsor: Standard Chartered
- Established: 2003 (23 years ago)
- Course records: Men's: 2:10:12 (2009) (Kenya) Moses Kigen; Women's: 2:24:31 (2023) (Kenya) Evaline Chirchir
- Website: Nairobi Marathon
- Participants: 30,602 (2025)

The Nairobi Marathon is an annual road running competition over the marathon distance usually held in October in Nairobi, Kenya. First held in 2003, the competition expanded and now includes a half marathon race along with the main race.

It was part of "The Greatest Race on Earth", fully sponsored by Standard Chartered Bank. The other three legs of this four-marathon race were the Hong Kong Marathon, the Mumbai Marathon and the Singapore Marathon.

The 2020 edition of the race was cancelled due to the coronavirus pandemic. The race returned in 2021 in a hybrid format, with a physical event capped at 2,500 elite athletes plus a virtual event for 13,500 additional participants, moved to the Southern Bypass and Carnivore Grounds. The marathon received World Athletics accreditation as a World Road Race in 2022. In 2019, Standard Chartered introduced its Futuremakers programme as the marathon's designated cause, succeeding the bank's earlier Seeing is Believing initiative.

Its 20th edition, in October 2023, drew over 22,000 participants, including more than 73 elite athletes and 200 athletes with disabilities. Standard Chartered handed over KES 43,167,506 raised from the race to Futuremakers. The 22nd edition, in 2025, drew a record 30,602 participants from over 90 countries, including more than 200 elite athletes and 184 athletes with disabilities. According to a 2026 comparison by Fit Savanna, a Kenyan fitness and events site, the Standard Chartered Nairobi Marathon ranked third among Kenyan marathons by published prize money that year, behind the Nairobi City Marathon and the Eldoret City Marathon, despite being the country's oldest major city marathon. The Nairobi City Marathon's full-marathon prize purse is published at KES 22.82 million combined for men and women, with KES 3.5 million going to each winner, while the Eldoret City Marathon offers a combined purse of KES 18.03 million, including KES 3.5 million to each winner, compared with KES 2 million for each Standard Chartered winner.

== Course ==
The official Standard Chartered Nairobi Marathon Runner's Guide includes maps of the race routes, including the 42 km marathon course.

Since 2021, the marathon has started and assembled outside Carnivore Grounds (at the Cale entrance) on Southern Bypass Road, finishing at Uhuru Gardens. The race previously started and finished at Nyayo National Stadium via Uhuru Highway and Mombasa Road, but moved when Uhuru Highway came under construction for the Nairobi Expressway. The race includes 5 km, 10 km, 21 km, and a 21 km wheelchair category alongside the marathon.

== Winners ==
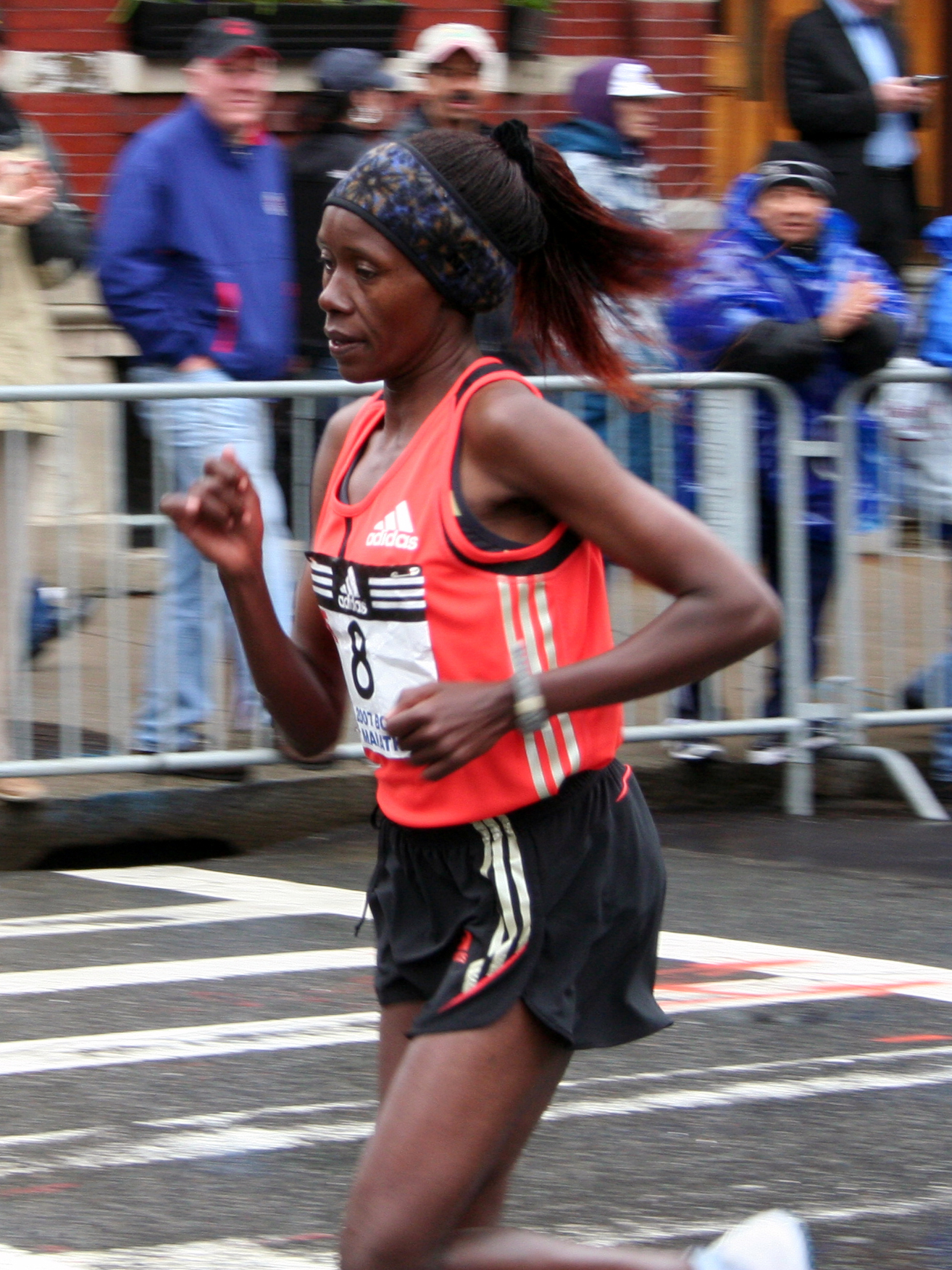
Alice Chelangat (pictured here at the 2007 Boston Marathon) was the inaugural women's marathon winner

Key: Course record

=== Marathon ===
Ed.	Year	Men's winner	Time	Women's winner	Time
1	2003	Philip Kirui (KEN)	2:15:40	Alice Chelangat (KEN)	2:41:27
2	2004	Benjamin Kemboi (KEN)	2:11:50	Joyce Chepchumba (KEN)	2:39:27
3	2005	Samson Barmao (KEN)	2:12:15	Caroline Kilel (KEN)	2:36:08
4	2006	Hosea Rotich (KEN)	2:10:17	Irene Kosgei (KEN)	2:32:42
5	2007	John Thuita (KEN)	2:15:50	Rose Chesire (KEN)	2:44:14
6	2008	Samson Tuiyange (KEN)	2:10:30	Emmah Kiruki (KEN)	2:33:42
7	2009	Moses Kigen (KEN)	2:10:12	Irene Kosgei (KEN)	2:28:57
8	2010	David Barmasai (KEN)	2:10:31	Helena Kirop (KEN)	2:31:11
9	2011	Ernest Kebenei (KEN)	2:10:55	Margaret Toroitich (KEN)	2:30:17
10	2012	Wesley Langat (KEN)	2:10:40	Alice Chelangat (KEN)	2:28:04
11	2013	Kenneth Mungara (KEN)	2:11:40	Winfrida Kwamboka (KEN)	2:33:18
12	2014	Peter Kosgei (KEN)	2:12:24	Edith Irungu (KEN)	2:32:02
13	2015	Joshua Kipkorir (KEN)	2:13:25	Elizabeth Rumokol (KEN)	2:29:32
14	2016	Robert Kipkemboi (KEN)	2:13:27	Jane Seurey (KEN)	2:34:18
15	2017	Brimin Kipkorir (KEN)	2:12:39	Celestine Jepchirchir (KEN)	2:31:41
16	2018	Elisha Barno (KEN)	2:14:19	Josephine Chepkoech (KEN)	2:33:11
17	2019	Brimin Kipkorir (KEN)	2:10:43	Purity Jebichii (KEN)	2:30:34
	2020	cancelled due to coronavirus pandemic			
18	2021	Elisha Kiprop (KEN)	2:11:16	Valentine Kipketer (KEN)	2:30:02
19	2022	Elias Kemboi Chelimo (KEN)	2:10:22	Sheila Chepkech (KEN)	2:27:04
20	2023	Alphonce Kigen (KEN)	2:10:18	Evaline Chirchir (KEN)	2:24:31
21	2024	Ronald Kimeli Kurgat (KEN)	2:13:05 (Note: World Athletics' results database lists Dominick Kipkirui Bett as the 2024 men's winner in 2:13:13; this article follows two independent race-day reports naming Ronald Kimeli Kurgat as the winner in 2:13:05, with Bett finishing second.)	Gladys Chemutai (KEN)	2:31:52
22	2025	Benard Chepkwony (KEN)	2:11:01	Hellen Chepkorir (KEN)	2:27:17

=== Half marathon ===
Ed.	Year	Men's winner	Time	Women's winner	Time
1	2004	Evans Cheruiyot (KEN)	1:04:21	Rita Jeptoo (KEN)	1:16:24
2	2005	Charles Kiama (KEN)	1:01:34	Lineth Chepkurui (KEN)	1:13:33
3	2006	Philemon Baaru (KEN)	1:01:21	Beatrice Rutto (KEN)	1:10:49
4	2007	Moses Kigen (KEN)	1:05:58	Alice Serser (KEN)	1:18:04
5	2008	Peter Chesang (KEN)	1:02:23	Paskalia Chepkorir (KEN)	1:11:07
6	2009	Ernest Kebenei (KEN)	1:01:54	Magdaline Chemjor (KEN)	1:12:18
7	2010	Michael Kiprop (KEN)	1:02:15	Chemtah Rionutukei (KEN)	1:12:47
8	2011	Dennis Kimetto (KEN)	1:01:31	Elizabeth Chelagat (KEN)	1:12:10
9	2012	Mathew Kiprotich (KEN)	1:02:19	Paskalia Chepkorir (KEN)	1:08:12
10	2013	Solomon Mutai (UGA)	1:02:55	Correti Jepkoech (KEN)	1:11:52
11	2014	Barselius Kipyego (KEN)	1:03:12	Lydia Wafula (KEN)	1:14:52
12	2015	Patrick Kipng'eno (KEN)	1:02:42	Purity Changwony (KEN)	1:11:17
13	2016	Reuben Limaa (KEN)	1:02:53	Betty Lempus (KEN)	1:12:26
14	2017	Felix Kibitok (KEN)	1:03:26	Valary Aiyabei (KEN)	1:11:04
15	2018	Mathew Kimutai (KEN)	1:04:57	Valary Aiyabei (KEN)	1:12:06
16	2019	Andrew Kwemoi (KEN)	1:01:52	Sheila Chepkirui (KEN)	1:11:51
	2020	cancelled due to coronavirus pandemic			
17	2021	Vincent Ng'etich (KEN)	1:01:44	Peris Engambi (KEN)	1:12:59
18	2022	Daniel Simiu (KEN)	1:00:05	Evaline Chirchir (KEN)	1:09:58
19	2023	Justus Kiprop (KEN)	1:02:39	Jackline Chelal (KEN)	1:11:18
20	2024	Vincent Mutai (KEN)	1:03:27	Caroline Olbara (KEN)	1:11:06
21	2025	Joshua Kithuku (KEN)	1:02:35	Fridah Rerimoi (KEN)	1:14:23
