= Valary Jemeli Aiyabei =

Kenyan long-distance runner

Sport
- Country: Kenya
- Sport: Athletics
- Event: Long-distance running

Valary Jemeli Aiyabei is a Kenyan long-distance runner. In 2019, she set a new course record of 2:19:10 in the Frankfurt Marathon.

In 2018, she won the Beijing Marathon with a time of 2:21:38.

== Achievements ==
| Year | Competition | Venue | Position | Event | Notes |
Representing Kenya
| 2014 | Belgrade Marathon | Belgrade, Serbia | 1st | Marathon | 2:37:08 |
| 2016 | Barcelona Marathon | Barcelona, Spain | 1st | Marathon | 2:25:26 |
| 2016 | Valencia Marathon | Valencia, Spain | 1st | Marathon | 2:24:48 |
| 2017 | Prague Marathon | Prague, Czech Republic | 1st | Marathon | 2:21:57 |
| 2017 | Berlin Marathon | Berlin, Germany | 3rd | Marathon | 2:20:53 |
| 2017 | Nairobi Half Marathon | Nairobi, Kenya | 1st | Half marathon | 1:11:04 |
| 2018 | Nagoya Women's Marathon | Nagoya, Japan | 2nd | Marathon | 2:22:48 |
| 2018 | Gifu Seiryu Half Marathon | Gifu, Japan | 2nd | Half marathon | 1:10:11 |
| 2018 | Beijing Marathon | Beijing, China | 1st | Marathon | 2:21:38 |
| 2018 | Nairobi Half Marathon | Nairobi, Kenya | 1st | Half marathon | 1:12:06 |
| 2019 | Nagoya Women's Marathon | Nagoya, Japan | 3rd | Marathon | 2:23:01 |
| 2019 | Frankfurt Marathon | Frankfurt am Main, Germany | 1st | Marathon | 2:19:10 |
