= 2014 Berlin Marathon =

41st edition of the Berlin Marathon

41st Berlin Marathon
- 2014 Berlin Marathon logo
- Venue: Berlin, Germany
- Dates: 28 September 2014

Champions
- Men: Dennis Kimetto (2:02:57 WR)
- Women: Tirfi Tsegaye (2:20:18)

The 2014 Berlin Marathon was the 41st edition of the Berlin Marathon. The marathon took place in Berlin, Germany, on 28 September 2014 and was the fourth World Marathon Majors race of the year.

The men's race was won by Kenyan athlete Dennis Kimetto in a world record time of 2:02:57, breaking the previous record of Wilson Kipsang by 26 seconds. Kimetto's performance means that the last six men's world records at the distance have all been set at the Berlin Marathon. Runner-up Emmanuel Mutai also surpassed Kipsang's old mark, finishing in 2:03:13. En route to his second-place finish, Mutai set a world record at the 30K distance (1:27:37).

The women's race was won by Tirfi Tsegaye of Ethiopia in a time of 2:20:18 hours.

Finishing third in a time of 2:21:14, Shalane Flanagan became the second fastest American woman at the marathon distance. Flanagan passed the 25K mark in 1:22:36, surpassing Janet Bawcom's previous American 25K record of 1:24:36.

== Results ==
=== Men ===
Position	Athlete	Nationality	Time
1st place, gold medalist(s)	Dennis Kimetto	Kenya	2:02:57 WR CR
2nd place, silver medalist(s)	Emmanuel Mutai	Kenya	2:03:13
3rd place, bronze medalist(s)	Abera Kuma	Ethiopia	2:05:56
4	Geoffrey Kamworor	Kenya	2:06:39
5	Eliud Kiptanui	Kenya	2:07:28
6	Frankline Chepkwony	Kenya	2:07:35
7	Levy Matebo	Kenya	2:08:33
8	Maswai Kiptanui	Kenya	2:10:18
9	Tsegaye Kebede	Ethiopia	2:10:27
10	Kazuki Tamaru	Japan	2:11:25
11	Fernando Cabada	United States	2:11:36
12	Abdelhadi El Hachimi	Belgium	2:12:45

Other notable finishers

- Scott Overall: 14th
- Kazuhiro Maeda: 16th

=== Women ===
Position	Athlete	Nationality	Time
1st place, gold medalist(s)	Tirfi Tsegaye	Ethiopia	2:20:18
2nd place, silver medalist(s)	Feyse Tadese	Ethiopia	2:20:27
3rd place, bronze medalist(s)	Shalane Flanagan	United States	2:21:14
4	Tadelech Bekele	Ethiopia	2:23:02
5	Abebech Afework	Ethiopia	2:25:02
6	Kayoko Fukushi	Japan	2:26:25
7	Anna Hahner	Germany	2:26:44
8	Ines Melchor	Peru	2:26:48
9	Rene Kalmer	South Africa	2:29:27
10	Adriana da Silva	Brazil	2:38:05
11	Karina Neipan	Argentina	2:41:21
12	Michele Das Chagas	Brazil	2:42:19

Other notable finishers

- Natalia Romero: 13th
- Helena Javornik: 40th

=== Wheelchair men ===
Position	Athlete	Nationality	Time
1st place, gold medalist(s)	Kota Hokinoue	Japan	1:32:25
2nd place, silver medalist(s)	Heinz Frei	Switzerland	1:36:12
3rd place, bronze medalist(s)	Tobias Lötscher	Switzerland	1:37:21

=== Wheelchair women ===
Position	Athlete	Nationality	Time
1st place, gold medalist(s)	Shelly Woods	United Kingdom	1:47:56
2nd place, silver medalist(s)	Margriet van den Broek	Netherlands	2:04:57
3rd place, bronze medalist(s)	Annika Zetterlund	Sweden	4:40:22
