= Inter-Prefectural Women's Ekiden =

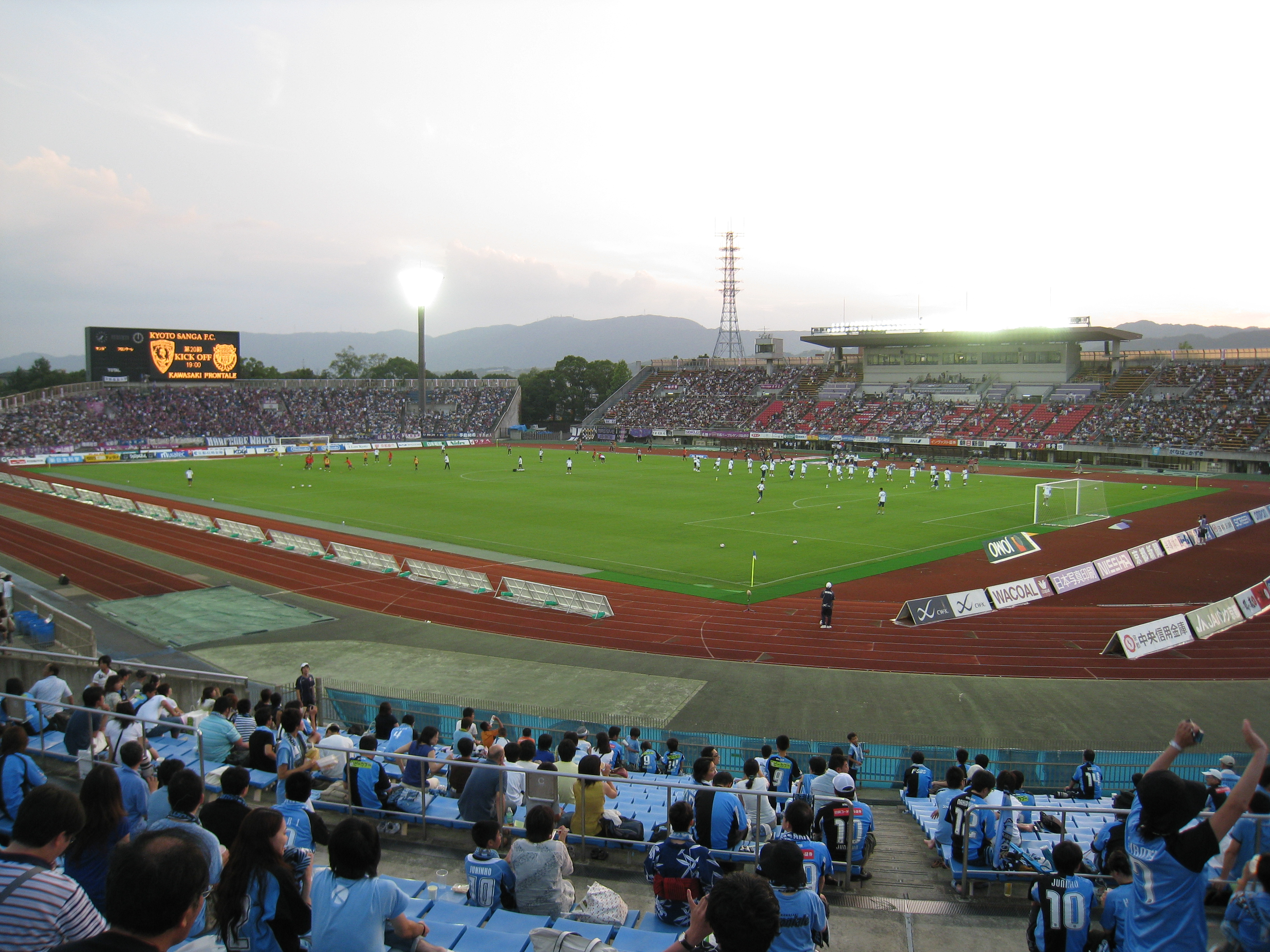
Nishikyogoku Athletic Stadium is the start and end point of the race

The Inter-Prefectural Women's Ekiden (全国都道府県対抗女子駅伝競走大会 (All-Japan Inter-Prefectural Women's Ekiden Championships)) is an annual women's ekiden (road running relay race) for Japanese runners held in January in Kyoto Prefecture. The course has a looped point-to-point format over the marathon distance of 42.195 km and begins and ends within the Nishikyogoku Athletic Stadium.

The competition was initiated in 1983 as a way of developing and improving the standard of women's long-distance running in Japan. All 47 Prefectures of Japan are allowed to enter a team into the event. The relay is divided into nine stages (or legs) of distances varying from 3 km to 10 km. Rather than being open to all, the stages are separated into age groups; competitors range from junior high school runners to fully-fledged professional athletes. This aspect is an essential part of the ethos of the competition: that younger athletes may interact and learn from more experienced runners. Non-Japanese nationals are not permitted to enter the competition and participants must represent the prefecture in which they are being schooled or, in the case of professionals, the prefecture in which they are mostly based.

The ekiden is organised by the Japanese Association of Athletics Federations (JAAF), the national governing body for the sport. It has three major sponsors: the Kyoto Shimbun (the regional newspaper), Murata Machinery, and NHK (the national broadcaster). The event is transmitted every year on the NHK General TV channel as well as NHK Radio 1.

The host prefecture, Kyoto, has historically been the most successful team at the competition by far, having won the ekiden on sixteen occasions. Hyogo and Chiba Prefecture are the next most successful, having won the event three times each. The event is among the most prestigious of the national women's running competitions and it attracts Japan's top runners within all the age ranges. Prominent women athletes to have competed at the event include: Olympic marathon champions Naoko Takahashi and Mizuki Noguchi, former world record holder Kayoko Fukushi, Vienna Marathon winner Tomo Morimoto and two-time Asian Games silver medallist Harumi Hiroyama.

The current course record of 2:14:55 hours was set by Kanagawa Prefecture in 2013.

== Stages ==
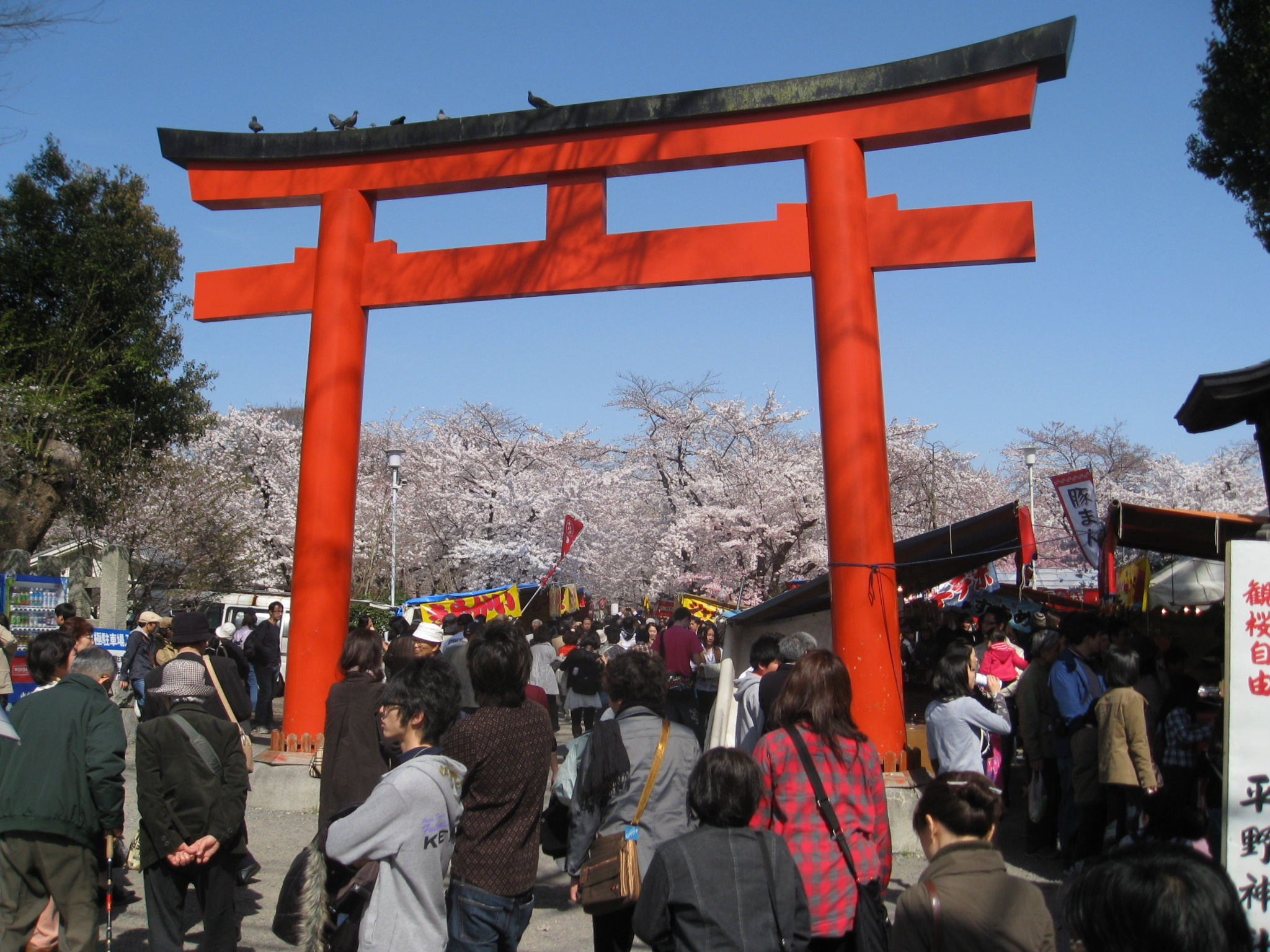
The race route passes the Hirano Shrine in the first stages.

Stage	Distance	Age limit	Route	Stage record (m:s)
1st	6 km		Nishikyogoku Athletic Stadium → Hirano Shrine	Miwako Yamanaka (18:44), 2003
2nd	4 km		Hirano Shrine → Karasuma Kyoto Hotel	Yuriko Kobayashi (12:07), 2009
3rd	3 km	Junior high	Karasuma → Marutamachi Kawaramachi	Yui Takahashi (9:11), 2004
4th	4 km		Marutamachi Kawaramachi → Shirakawa Street	Seira Fuwa (12:29), 2022
5th	4.1075 km		Shirakawa Street → Kyoto International Conference Center	Taeko Igarashi (12:53), 1995
6th	4.0875 km		Kyoto International Conference Center → Shirakawa Street	Nanako Kanno (12:39), 2011
7th	4 km		Shirakawa Street → Marutamachi Teramachi	Kazue Kojima (12:21), 2007
8th	3 km	Junior high	Marutamachi Teramachi → Karasuma	Moe Kyuma (9:41), 2009
9th	10 km		Karasuma → Nishikyogoku Athletic Stadium	Kayoko Fukushi (30:02), 2004

== Editions ==
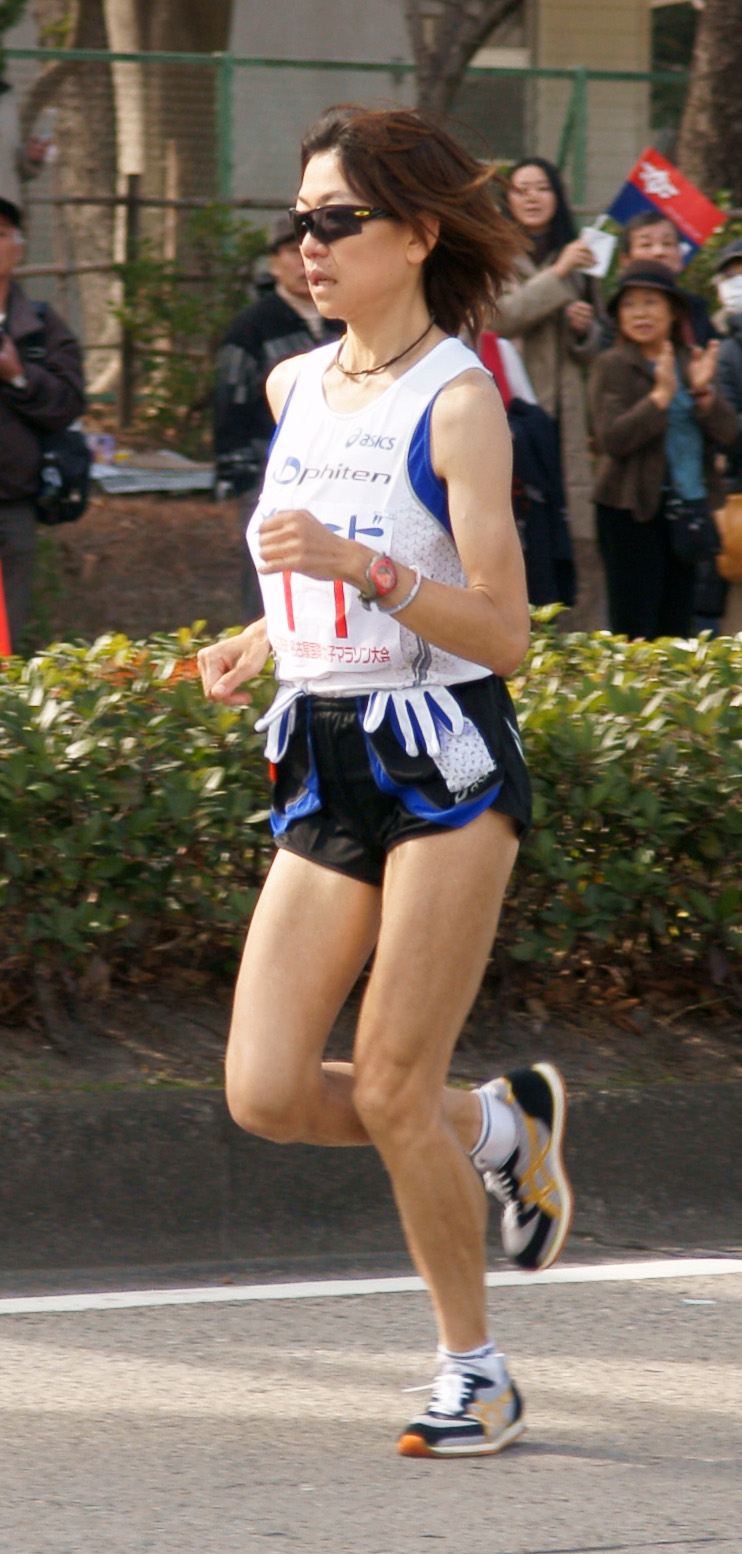
The 2000 Olympic marathon champion Naoko Takahashi ran for Gifu Prefecture.

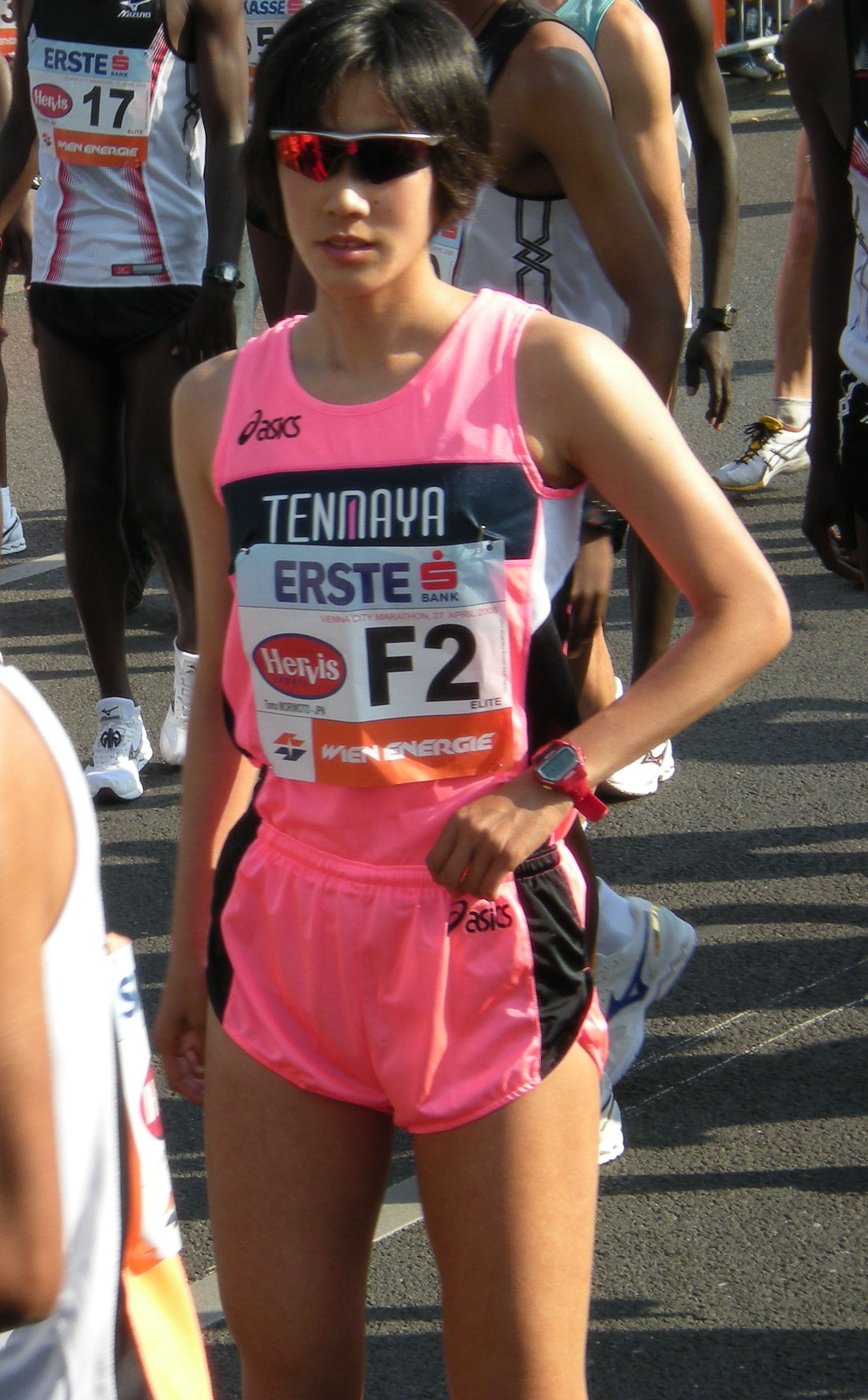
Tomo Morimoto took the Okayama team to third place in 2008.

Key: Course record

Edition	Year	Winner	Time (h:m:s)
1st	1983	Chiba	2:29:02
2nd	1984	Kyoto	2:27:14
3rd	1985	Chiba	2:25:32
4th	1986	Kagoshima	2:22:59
5th	1987	Kanagawa	2:23:05
6th	1988	Kyoto	2:20:25
7th	1989	Kyoto	2:18:41
8th	1990	Kyoto	2:17:17
9th	1991	Kyoto	2:16:01
10th	1992	Kyoto	2:17:55
11th	1993	Osaka	2:19:15
12th	1994	Chiba	2:18:04
13th	1995	Miyagi	2:17:50
14th	1996	Kyoto	2:17:19
15th	1997	Kumamoto	2:15:19
16th	1998	Saitama	2:16:54
17th	1999	Fukuoka	2:18:16
18th	2000	Nagasaki	2:17:19
19th	2001	Hyogo	2:17:57
20th	2002	Kyoto	2:15:55
21st	2003	Hyogo	2:16:02
22nd	2004	Hyogo	2:16:18
23rd	2005	Kyoto	2:16:22
24th	2006	Kyoto	2:15:26
25th	2007	Kyoto	2:17:03
26th	2008	Kyoto	2:14:58
27th	2009	Kyoto	2:15:39
28th	2010	Okayama	2:16:24
29th	2011	Kyoto	2:17:16
30th	2012	Osaka	2:16:47
31st	2013	Kanagawa	2:14:55
32nd	2014	Kyoto	2:15:32
33rd	2015	Osaka	2:17:26
34th	2016	Aichi	2:16:02
35th	2017	Kyoto	2:17:45
