= Tirfi Tsegaye =

Ethiopian long-distance runner

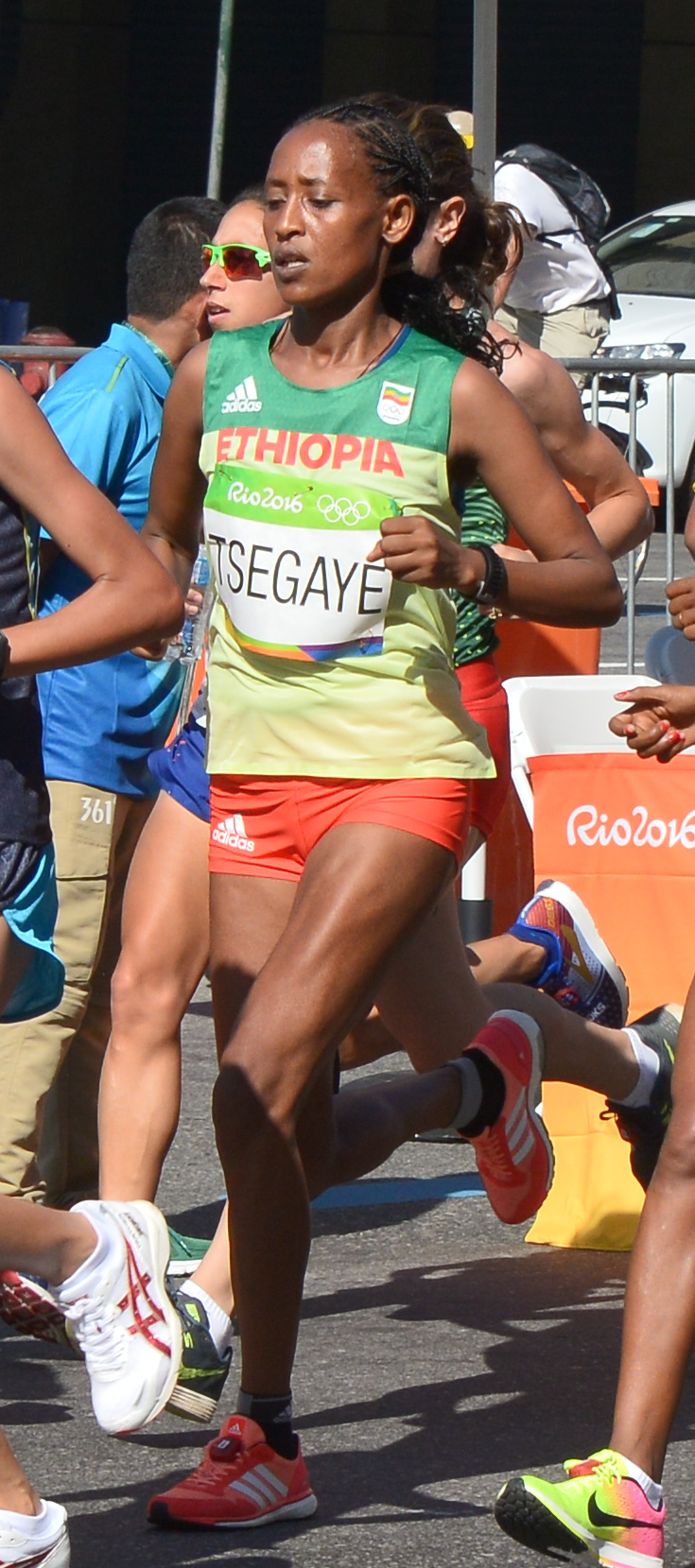
- Tsegaye at the 2016 Olympics

Personal information
- Born: 25 November 1984 (age 41)
- Height: 162 cm (5 ft 4 in)
- Weight: 52 kg (115 lb)

Sport
- Sport: Athletics
- Event(s): 10,000 m, marathon

Achievements and titles
- Personal best(s): 10,000 m – 31:57 (2012) marathon – 2:19:41 (2016)

Tirfi Tsegaye Beyene (born 25 November 1984) is an Ethiopian long-distance runner who competes in marathon races. She has won the Berlin Marathon, the Paris Marathon (in a course record), the Tokyo Marathon (also in course-record time), and the Dubai Marathon. Her personal best of 2:20:18 hours came as winner of the 2014 Berlin Marathon.

== Career ==
Born in Bekoji in Ethiopia's Oromia Region, she comes from a town renowned for producing world class runners such as Kenenisa Bekele and Tirunesh Dibaba. In one of her first major races, Tirfi won the Porto Marathon in 2008 with a time of 2:35:31 hours. She improved her best to 2:29:04 hours with a runner-up finish at the 2009 Turin Marathon and then bettered that with a run of 2:28:16 hours for second at the Shanghai Marathon. She also made her debut over the half marathon at the 2009 IAAF World Half Marathon Championships, where her run of 1:09:24 brought her sixth place and a team silver medal with Ethiopia.

Tirfi was runner-up to Atsede Baysa at the 2010 Paris Half Marathon, then finished behind her again at the Paris Marathon a month later, although Tirfi's time of 2:24:51 hours for third place was a significant personal best. She again made the podium at the Toronto Waterfront Marathon, setting another best of 2:22:44 hours and finishing second behind Sharon Cherop. She was also runner-up at the Shanghai Marathon for the second year running, beaten to the title by Nailiya Yulamanova.

She was invited to compete at the 2011 Boston Marathon and she finished in eleventh in the high-profile race. She came fifth at that year's Lille Half Marathon then was three seconds behind Shanghai Marathon winner Haile Lema Kebebush in December with her time of 2:24:11 hours (her third straight second-place finish at the race). At the Roma-Ostia Half Marathon in February 2012 she ran a personal best of 1:07:42 hours for third place. She was the pre-race favourite for the Paris Marathon and delivered on the status by winning the race in a course record and personal best time of 2:21:39 hours, over three minutes ahead of runner-up Sultan Haydar. Running alongside her training partner, Aberu Kebede, she was runner-up at the 2012 Berlin Marathon with a personal best time of 2:21:19 hours.

In January 2013, she won the Dubai Marathon despite the heavy fog during the race, with a time of 2:23:23, 16 seconds ahead of runner-up Ehitu Kiros. She performed less well in her second race of the year, coming seventh at the Frankfurt Marathon in 2:26:57 hours.

She won the 2014 Berlin Marathon, held on 28 September 2014, in a personal best time of 2:20:18.
