= The Greatest Race on Earth =

Four-part series of marathon races in a relay format

The Greatest Race on Earth (GROE) was a four-part series of marathon races in a relay format, which included the Nairobi Marathon, Singapore Marathon, Mumbai Marathon and Hong Kong Marathon. It was created and sponsored by Standard Chartered in 2005. The total prize pool for the 2006–07 series was US$1.5 million.

The competition was won by the team of four athletes who had the lowest cumulative time across the four marathons, with each team member competing in only one marathon as part of their respective team's relay.

Standard Chartered announced they had ceased sponsorship of The Greatest Race on Earth in July 2009, bringing the competition to a close.
