= Risa Takenaka =

Japanese long-distance runner

Personal information
- Nationality: Japanese
- Born: January 6, 1990 (age 36)

Sport
- Country: Japan
- Sport: Long-Distance Running
- University team: Japan Collegiate

Achievements and titles
- Personal best: 2:28:09 (Marathon)

Risa Takenaka (Japanese: 竹中 理沙; born January 6, 1990) is a Japanese long-distance runner who competes in marathon races.

Takenaka was part of the winning team at the 2010 International Chiba Ekiden.

Takenaka won the 2015 Gold Coast Marathon, defeating Keiko Nogami and Manami Kamitanida.
