= Aberu Kebede =

Ethiopian long-distance runner (born 1986)

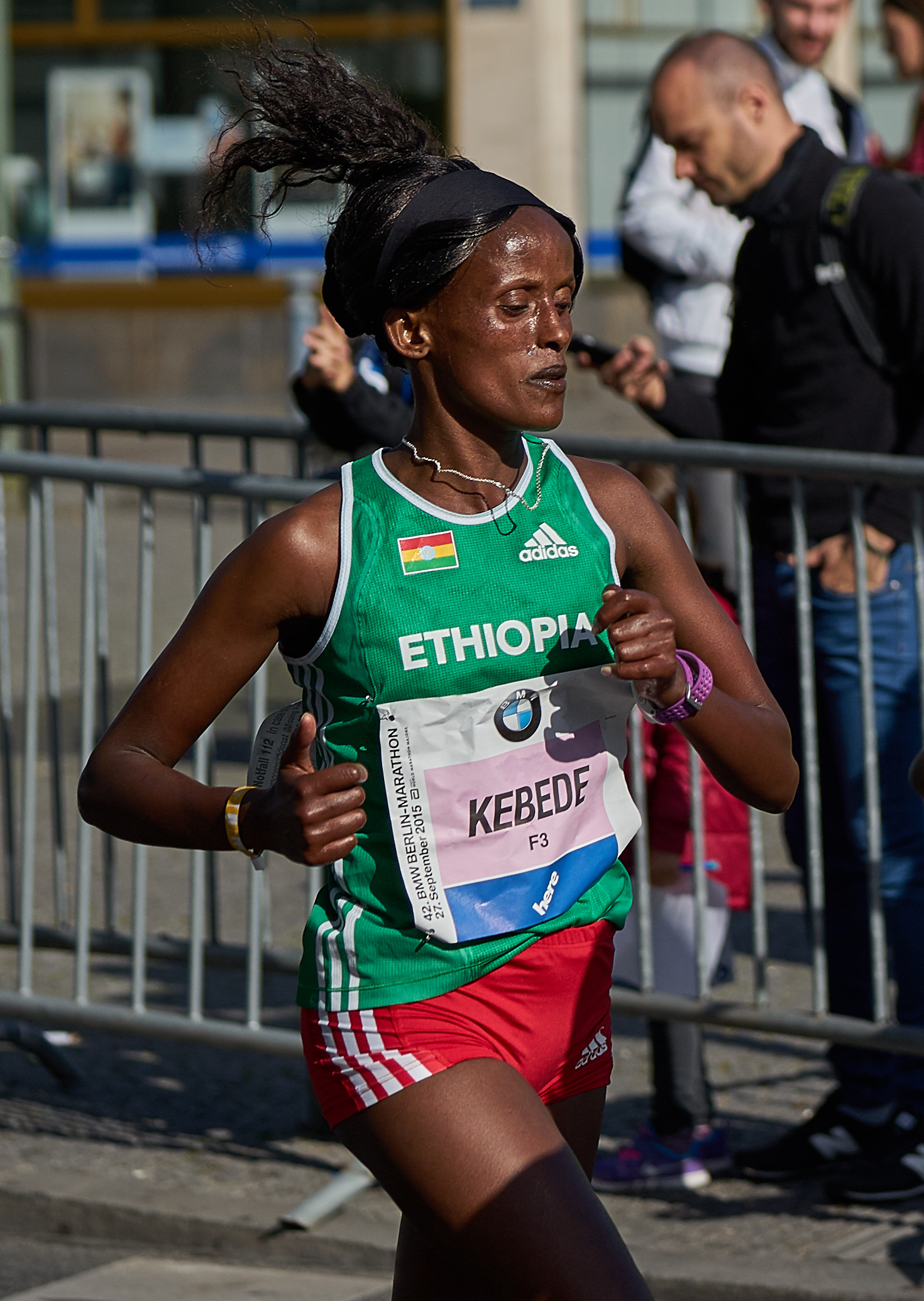
- Aberu at the 2015 Berlin Marathon

Personal information
- Born: 12 September 1986 (age 40) Shewa, Ethiopia
Medal record
Women's athletics
Representing Ethiopia
IAAF World Half Marathon Championships
| Silver medal – second place | 2009 Birmingham | Team |
| Bronze medal – third place | 2009 Birmingham | Individual |

Aberu Kebede Shewaye (born 12 September 1986) is an Ethiopian long-distance runner who specializes in road running competitions. Her half marathon best of 1:07:39 is one of the fastest ever by an Ethiopian woman. She gained bronze at the 2009 IAAF World Half Marathon Championships with the performance and has won at the Berlin Marathon, Stramilano Half Marathon and the Rotterdam Marathon. She has a marathon best of 2:20:30 hours.

== Career ==
Born in Shewa, Ethiopia, she made her first appearances in cross country running. Having come third in the junior race at the 2007 Jan Meda Cross Country International, she qualified for the 2007 IAAF World Cross Country Championships, where she finished 16th in the junior women's race. She was fourth at the 2008 Women First 5K in Addis Ababa.

She won the Stramilano Half Marathon in April 2009 and, pleased at having set a course record and personal best of 1:08:43, she turned her attention to the Ethiopian Championships. She scored a national title in the 10,000 metres at the Ethiopian Athletics Championships in May, beating Mamitu Daska and Werknesh Kidane to the domestic honours. Later that month, she ran at the World 10K Bangalore and was beaten by a few seconds, eventually finishing in third. She improved her 10,000 m best in Utrecht in June, setting a time of 30:48.26. She was selected for the 2009 World Championships in Athletics, but ultimately did not compete.

Aberu ran at the Women's 5K Challenge in London and took third again in another close finish. Running at her first senior championships, she led with Mary Keitany for much of the 2009 IAAF World Half Marathon Championships. Eventually Keitany broke away and Aberu ended up with a bronze after losing out on a sprint finish against Philes Ongori. Still, she managed to improve her best to a time of 1:07:39 and lead the Ethiopian women to the team silver medal. This time made her the second fastest Ethiopian woman over the distance after Dire Tune. In November, she finished in 1:07:59 for third at the Delhi Half Marathon, again behind Keitany who broke the course record.

Aberu opened the year with a debut over the marathon distance. At the Dubai Marathon she was beaten by Mamitu Daska to the US$250,000 prize pot, but she still managed second place on her debut, recording a time of 2:24:26. She made a strong start to the 2010 Rotterdam Marathon and never relinquished the lead, winning in a time of 2:25:25. She led the Berlin Marathon with a front-running performance, beating fellow Ethiopian Bezunesh Bekele to win the race. She set a new best time of 2:23:58 and ran the second half of the race faster than her first, crossing the line a minute ahead of the opposition. She was out-done in a sprint finish at the Delhi Half Marathon in November, taking fourth place four seconds behind race winner Aselefech Mergia. She topped the podium at the 2011 Lisbon Half Marathon, beating Ana Dulce Felix to the line. At that year's London Marathon she was among the leading runners but was overtaken by a number of rivals in the latter stages and ended up in ninth place.

The 2012 Dubai Marathon saw her run a personal best of 2:20:33 to move into the top twenty fastest women ever, although the high quality of the race meant she finished in fifth place overall. A sixth-place finish at the 2012 London Marathon followed and she narrowly missed out on a spot on the Olympic team with her run of 31:09.28 for fifth at the 10,000 m trial at the Prefontaine Classic. She topped the podium at the 2012 Berlin Marathon and reduced her personal best by three further seconds. Her year ended with wins at the Great Ethiopian Run and the Ethiopian Clubs Cross Country Championships.

She won the 2013 Tokyo Marathon, her first race of the year, and was six seconds off the course record in windy conditions.

In 2022, Kebede was retroactively disqualified from the 2007 World Cross Country Championships U20 women's race for being overaged. Her year of birth was updated from 1989 to 1986.

== Personal bests ==
| Event | Time (h:m:s) | Venue | Date |
|---|---|---|---|
| 10,000 metres | 30:48.26 | Utrecht, Netherlands | 14 June 2009 |
| 10 kilometres | 31:05 | Birmingham, United Kingdom | 11 October 2009 |
| 20 kilometres | 1:03:57 | Birmingham, United Kingdom | 11 October 2009 |
| Half marathon | 1:07:39 | Birmingham, United Kingdom | 11 October 2009 |
| Marathon | 2:20:30 | Berlin, Germany | 30 September 2012 |

- All information taken from IAAF profile.

== Competition record ==
| Year | Competition | Venue | Position | Event | Notes |
|---|---|---|---|---|---|
| 2007 | World Cross Country Championships | Mombasa, Kenya | ~~16th~~ DQ | Junior race | Individual |
| 2009 | World Half Marathon Championships | Birmingham, United Kingdom | 3rd | Half marathon | Individual |
| 2009 | World Half Marathon Championships | Birmingham, United Kingdom | 2nd | Half marathon | Team |
| 2013 | World Championships | Moscow, Russia | 13th | Marathon | Individual |

=== Road race wins ===
- Stramilano Half Marathon: 2009
- Rotterdam Marathon: 2010
- Berlin Marathon: 2010
- Berlin Marathon: 2012
- Berlin Marathon: 2016
