= List of winners of the Tokyo Marathon =

The Tokyo Marathon is one of seven World Marathon Majors and has been contested annually since 2007, except in 2020 when it was an elite-only race due to the COVID-19 pandemic and in 2021, when the marathon was postponed to 2022 due to the continuing effects of the COVID-19 pandemic. The Tokyo Marathon replaced two previous marathons in Tokyo, the Tokyo International Marathon which took place in even years from 1980 to 2006, and the Tokyo - New York Friendship International Marathon which took place in odd years. Ethiopia is tied with Kenya for the most Tokyo Marathon winners of any country, with 12 wins among 10 distinct winners (five men and five women), while Kenya has been represented by the most winners in the men's race with eight wins among seven distinct winners, in addition to four winners in the women's race. Japan has the most wins in the wheelchair race, with 12 wins among five distinct winners on the men's side and 11 wins among two distinct winners on the women's side.

== Winners ==
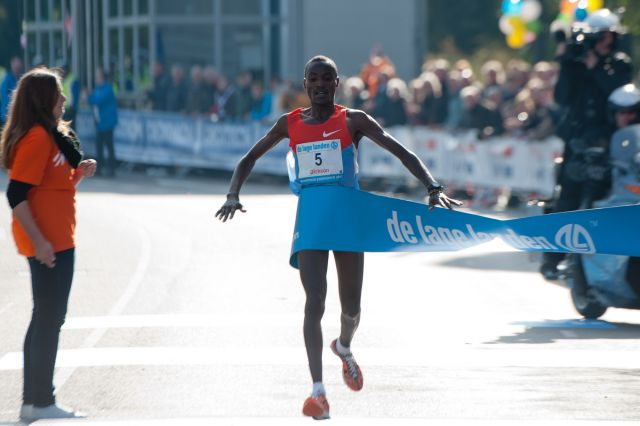
Dickson Chumba won the men's division of the Tokyo Marathon in 2014 and 2018.

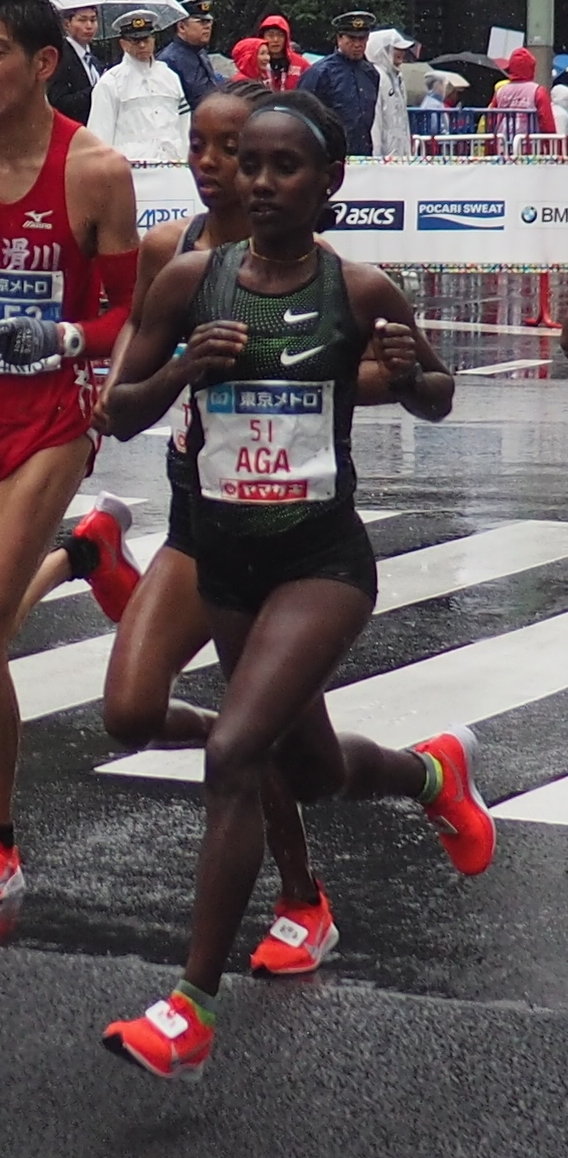
Ruti Aga won the women's division of the Tokyo Marathon in 2019.

Key: Course record (in bold)

Year	Men's winner	Country	Time	Women's winner	Country	Time	Rf.
2007	Daniel Njenga	Kenya	2:09:45	Hitomi Niiya	Japan	2:31:01	
2008	Viktor Röthlin	Switzerland	2:07:23	Claudia Dreher	Germany	2:35:35	
2009	Salim Kipsang	Kenya	2:10:27	Mizuho Nasukawa	Japan	2:25:38	
2010	Masakazu Fujiwara	Japan	2:12:19	Alevtina Biktimirova	Russia	2:34:39	
2011	Hailu Mekonnen	Ethiopia	2:07:35	Noriko Higuchi (Note: Russian Tatyana Aryasova had originally been declared the winner, but was disqualified in 2012 for failing a drug test.)	Japan	2:28:49	
2012	Michael Kipyego	Kenya	2:07:37	Atsede Habtamu	Ethiopia	2:25:28	
2013	Dennis Kimetto	Kenya	2:06:50	Aberu Kebede	Ethiopia	2:25:34	
2014	Dickson Chumba	Kenya	2:05:42	Tirfi Tsegaye	Ethiopia	2:22:23	
2015	Endeshaw Negesse	Ethiopia	2:06:00	Birhane Dibaba	Ethiopia	2:23:15	
2016	Feyisa Lilesa	Ethiopia	2:06:56	Helah Kiprop	Kenya	2:21:27	
2017	Wilson Kipsang	Kenya	2:03:58	Sarah Chepchirchir	Kenya	2:19:47	
2018	Dickson Chumba	Kenya	2:05:30	Birhane Dibaba	Ethiopia	2:19:51	
2019	Birhanu Legese	Ethiopia	2:04:48	Ruti Aga	Ethiopia	2:20:40	
2020	Birhanu Legese	Ethiopia	2:04:15	Lonah Chemtai	Israel	2:17:45	
2021 (Note: This edition of the Tokyo Marathon was postponed from 2021 due to the COVID-19 pandemic and took place on 6 March 2022. Despite being postponed to 2022, it was still officially referred to as the 2021 Tokyo Marathon.)	Eliud Kipchoge	Kenya	2:02:40	Brigid Kosgei	Kenya	2:16:02	
2023	Deso Gelmisa	Ethiopia	2:05:22	Rosemary Wanjiru	Kenya	2:16:28	
2024	Benson Kipruto	Kenya	**2:02:16**	Sutume Kebede	Ethiopia	**2:15:55**	
2025	Tadese Takele	Ethiopia	2:03:23	Sutume Kebede (2)	Ethiopia	2:16:31	

=== Wheelchair race ===
Year	Men's winner	Country	Time	Women's winner	Country	Time	Rf.
2007	Masazumi Soejima	Japan	1:32:21	-			
2008	Masazumi Soejima	Japan	1:27:15	Wakako Tsuchida	Japan	1:45:19	
2009	Masazumi Soejima	Japan	1:33:11	Wakako Tsuchida	Japan	1:46:31	
2010	Hiroyuki Yamamoto	Japan	1:35:19	Wakako Tsuchida	Japan	1:53:01	
2011	Masazumi Soejima	Japan	1:25:38	Wakako Tsuchida	Japan	1:40:08	
2012	Hiroyuki Yamamoto	Japan	1:29:26	Wakako Tsuchida	Japan	1:48:31	
2013	Masazumi Soejima	Japan	1:27:53	Wakako Tsuchida	Japan	1:48:29	
2014	Hiroyuki Yamamoto	Japan	1:30:43	Wakako Tsuchida	Japan	1:48:08	
2015	Kota Hokinoue	Japan	1:30:23	Wakako Tsuchida	Japan	1:46:30	
2016	Kurt Fearnley	Australia	1:26:00	Wakako Tsuchida	Japan	1:41:04	
2017	Sho Watanabe	Japan	1:28:01	Amanda McGrory	United States	1:43:27	
2018	Hiroyuki Yamamoto	Japan	1:26:23	Manuela Schär	Switzerland	1:43:25	
2019	Marcel Hug	Switzerland	1:30:44	Manuela Schär	Switzerland	1:46:57	
2020	Tomoki Suzuki	Japan	1:21:52	Tsubasa Kina	Japan	1:40:00	
2021	Marcel Hug	Switzerland	1:22:16	Tsubasa Kina	Japan	1:40:21	
2023	Marcel Hug	Switzerland	1:20:57	Manuela Schär	Switzerland	1:36:43	
2024	Tomoki Suzuki	Japan	1:23:05	Manuela Schär	Switzerland	1:40:10	
2025	Tomoki Suzuki	Japan	**1:19:14**	Catherine Debrunner	Switzerland	**1:35:56**	

== Victories by nationality ==
Country	Male victories	Female victories	Men's Wheelchair	Women's Wheelchair	Total
Japan	1	3	13	11	28
Ethiopia	7	8	0	0	15
Kenya	9	4	0	0	13
Switzerland	1	0	3	4	8
Australia	0	0	1	0	1
Germany	0	1	0	0	1
Israel	0	1	0	0	1
Russia	0	1	0	0	1
United States	0	0	0	1	1
