= 2009 Tokyo Marathon =

3rd Tokyo Marathon
- Venue: Tokyo, Japan
- Dates: 22 March

Champions
- Men: Salim Kipsang (2:10:27)
- Women: Mizuho Nasukawa (2:25:38)

The 2009 Tokyo Marathon (Japanese: 東京マラソン 2009) was the third edition of the annual marathon race in Tokyo, Japan and was held on Sunday, 22 March. The men's race was won by Kenya's Salim Kipsang in a time of 2:10:27, while the women's race was won by home athlete Mizuho Nasukawa in 2:25:38.

== Results ==
=== Men ===
Position	Athlete	Nationality	Time
1	Salim Kipsang	Kenya	2:10:27
2	Kazuhiro Maeda	Japan	2:11:01
3	Kensuke Takahashi	Japan	2:11:25
4	Sammy Korir	Kenya	2:11:57
5	Kenta Oshima	Japan	2:12:54
6	Tomoyuki Sato	Japan	2:13:12
7	Dmytro Baranovskyy	Ukraine	2:13:27
8	Asnake Fekadu	Ethiopia	2:13:40
9	Kentaro Nakamoto	Japan	2:13:53
10	Atsushi Fujita	Japan	2:14:00

=== Women ===
Position	Athlete	Nationality	Time
1	Mizuho Nasukawa	Japan	2:25:38
2	Yukari Sahaku	Japan	2:28:55
3	Reiko Tosa	Japan	2:29:19
4	Alevtina Biktimirova	Russia	2:29:33
5	Shitaye Gemechu	Ethiopia	2:29:59
6	Kiyoko Shimahara	Japan	2:31:57
7	Hiromi Ominami	Japan	2:32:11
8	Luminița Talpoș	Romania	2:32:22
9	Pamela Chepchumba	Kenya	2:32:40
10	Harumi Hiroyama	Japan	2:35:39
