= 2010 Tokyo Marathon =

4th Tokyo Marathon
- Venue: Tokyo, Japan
- Dates: 28 February

Champions
- Men: Masakazu Fujiwara (2:12:19)
- Women: Alevtina Biktimirova (2:34:39)

The 2010 Tokyo Marathon (Japanese: 東京マラソン 2010) was the fourth edition of the annual marathon race in Tokyo, Japan and was held on Sunday, 28 February. The men's race was won by home athlete Masakazu Fujiwara in a time of 2:12:19, while the women's race was won by Russia's Alevtina Biktimirova in 2:34:39.

== Results ==
=== Men ===
Position	Athlete	Nationality	Time
1	Masakazu Fujiwara	Japan	2:12:19
2	Arata Fujiwara	Japan	2:12:34
3	Atsushi Sato	Japan	2:12:35
4	Yuki Kawauchi	Japan	2:12:36
5	Tomoya Adachi	Japan	2:12:46
6	Joseph Muwaniki	Japan	2:12:53
7	Rachid Kisri	Morocco	2:12:59
8	Takaaki Koda	Japan	2:13:04
9	Salim Kipsang	Kenya	2:13:16
10	Kiyokatsu Hasegawa	Japan	2:15:15

=== Women ===
Position	Athlete	Nationality	Time
1	Alevtina Biktimirova	Russia	2:34:39
2	Robe Guta	Ethiopia	2:36:29
3	Nuța Olaru	Romania	2:36:42
4	Maki Kouno	Japan	2:39:01
5	Yang Jing	China	2:41:04
6	Yumi Satō	Japan	2:43:01
7	Wakana Hanadou	Japan	2:44:03
8	Julia Mumbi Muraga	Kenya	2:45:11
9	Yoshimi Kasezawa	Japan	2:47:03
10	Noriko Hirao	Japan	2:47:32
