= 2011 Tokyo Marathon =

5th Tokyo Marathon
- Venue: Tokyo, Japan
- Dates: 27 February

Champions
- Men: Hailu Mekonnen (2:07:35)
- Women: Noriko Higuchi (2:28:49)

The 2011 Tokyo Marathon (Japanese: 東京マラソン 2011) was the fifth edition of the annual marathon race in Tokyo, Japan and was held on Sunday, 27 February. The men's race was won by Ethiopian Hailu Mekonnen in a time of 2:07:35, while the women's race was won by home athlete Noriko Higuchi in 2:28:49. The original winner of the women's race was Tatyana Aryasova of Russia in 2:27:29, but she was later disqualified after failing a doping test.

== Results ==
=== Men ===
Position	Athlete	Nationality	Time
1	Hailu Mekonnen	Ethiopia	2:07:35
2	Paul Biwott	Kenya	2:08:17
3	Yuki Kawauchi	Japan	2:08:37
4	Yoshinori Oda	Japan	2:09:03
5	Cyrus Njubi	Kenya	2:09:10
6	Felix Limo	Kenya	2:10:50
7	Takaaki Koda	Japan	2:11:08
8	Salim Kipsang	Kenya	2:11:25
9	Yemane Tsegay	Ethiopia	2:11:49
10	Takashi Horiguchi	Japan	2:12:05

=== Women ===
Position	Athlete	Nationality	Time
1	Noriko Higuchi	Japan	2:28:49
2	Tatyana Petrova Arkhipova	Russia	2:28:56
3	Yoko Shibui	Japan	2:29:03
4	Misaki Katsumata	Japan	2:31:10
5	Sumiko Suzuki	Japan	2:32:02
6	Rina Yamazaki	Japan	2:32:51
7	Shoko Miyazaki	Japan	2:33:10
8	Yumi Hirata	Japan	2:33:14
9	Olena Burkovska	Ukraine	2:33:30
10	Miki Ohira	Japan	2:34:46
—	Tatyana Aryasova	Russia	2:27:29 DQ
