= 2012 Tokyo Marathon =

6th Tokyo Marathon
- Venue: Tokyo, Japan
- Dates: 26 February

Champions
- Men: Michael Kipyego (2:07:37)
- Women: Atsede Habtamu (2:25:28)

The 2012 Tokyo Marathon (Japanese: 東京マラソン 2012) was the sixth edition of the annual marathon race in Tokyo, Japan and was held on Sunday, 26 February. The men's race was won by Kenyan Michael Kipyego in a time of 2:07:37, while the women's race was won by Ethiopia's Atsede Habtamu in 2:25:28.

== Results ==
=== Men ===
Position	Athlete	Nationality	Time
1	Michael Kipyego	Kenya	2:07:37
2	Arata Fujiwara	Japan	2:07:48
3	Stephen Kiprotich	Uganda	2:07:50
4	Haile Gebrselassie	Ethiopia	2:08:17
5	Viktor Röthlin	Switzerland	2:08:32
6	Kazuhiro Maeda	Japan	2:08:38
7	Takayuki Matsumiya	Japan	2:09:28
8	Hailu Mekonnen	Ethiopia	2:09:59
9	Takeshi Kumamoto	Japan	2:10:13
10	Atsushi Ikawa	Japan	2:11:26

=== Women ===
Position	Athlete	Nationality	Time
1	Atsede Habtamu	Ethiopia	2:25:28
2	Yeshi Esayias	Ethiopia	2:26:00
3	Helena Kirop	Kenya	2:26:02
4	Eri Okubo	Japan	2:26:08
5	Tatyana Aryasova	Russia	2:26:46
6	Lishan Dula	Bahrain	2:28:22
7	Eyerusalem Kuma	Ethiopia	2:28:36
8	Kateryna Stetsenko	Ukraine	2:28:38
9	Adriana Aparecida da Silva	Brazil	2:29:17
10	Sumiko Suzuki	Japan	2:29:25
