= 2015 Tokyo Marathon =

Running event in Tokio

9th Tokyo Marathon
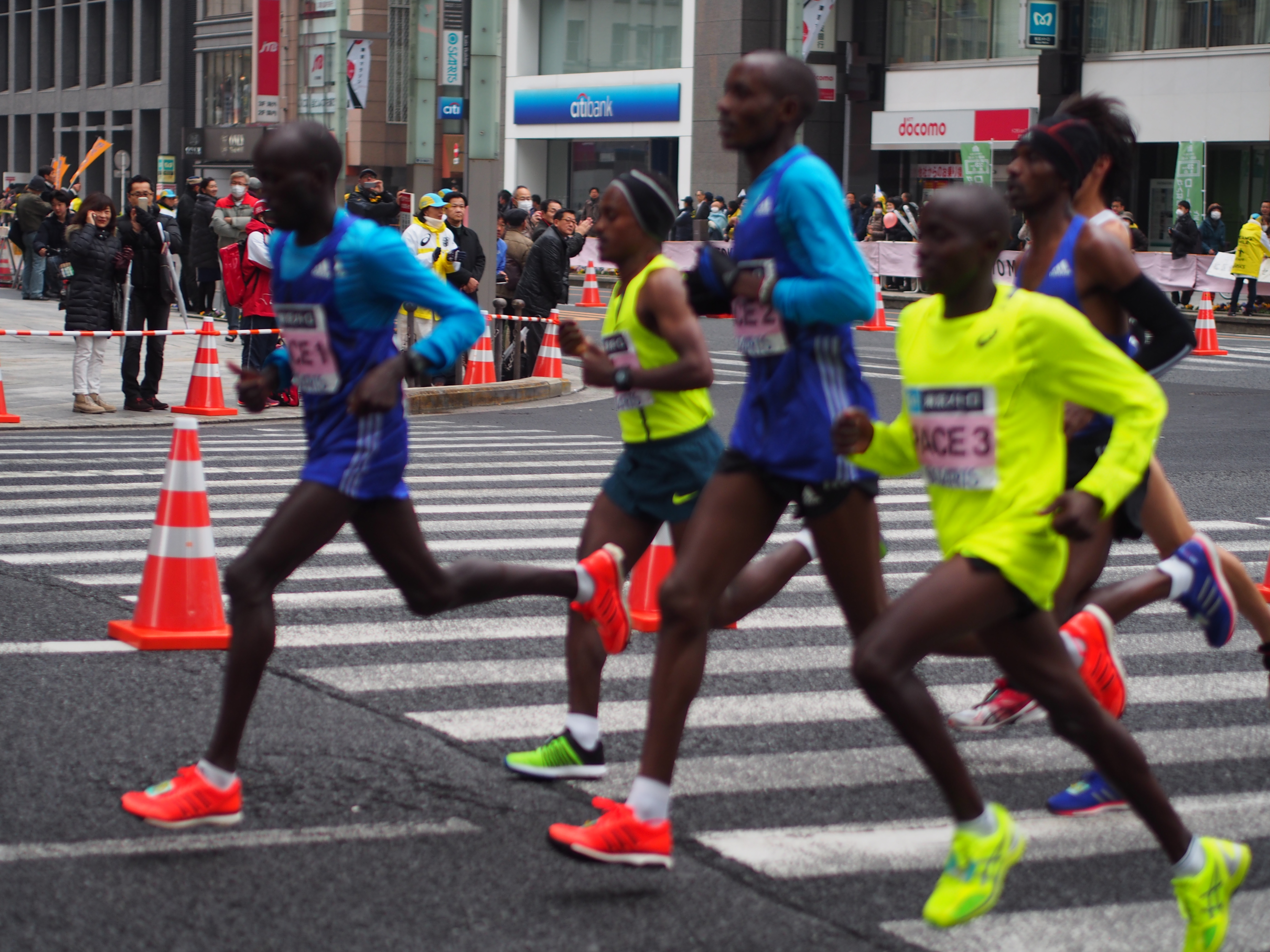
- The leading men with pacemakers during the race
- Venue: Tokyo, Japan
- Dates: 22 February

Medalists
gold medal	Endeshaw Negesse (2:06:00); Berhane Dibaba (2:23:15)

The 2015 Tokyo Marathon (Japanese: 東京マラソン 2015) was the ninth edition of the annual marathon race in Tokyo, Japan and was held on Sunday, 22 February. An IAAF Gold Label Road Race, it was the first World Marathon Majors event to be held that year and represented the third occasion that the Tokyo race was part of the elite-level marathon series.

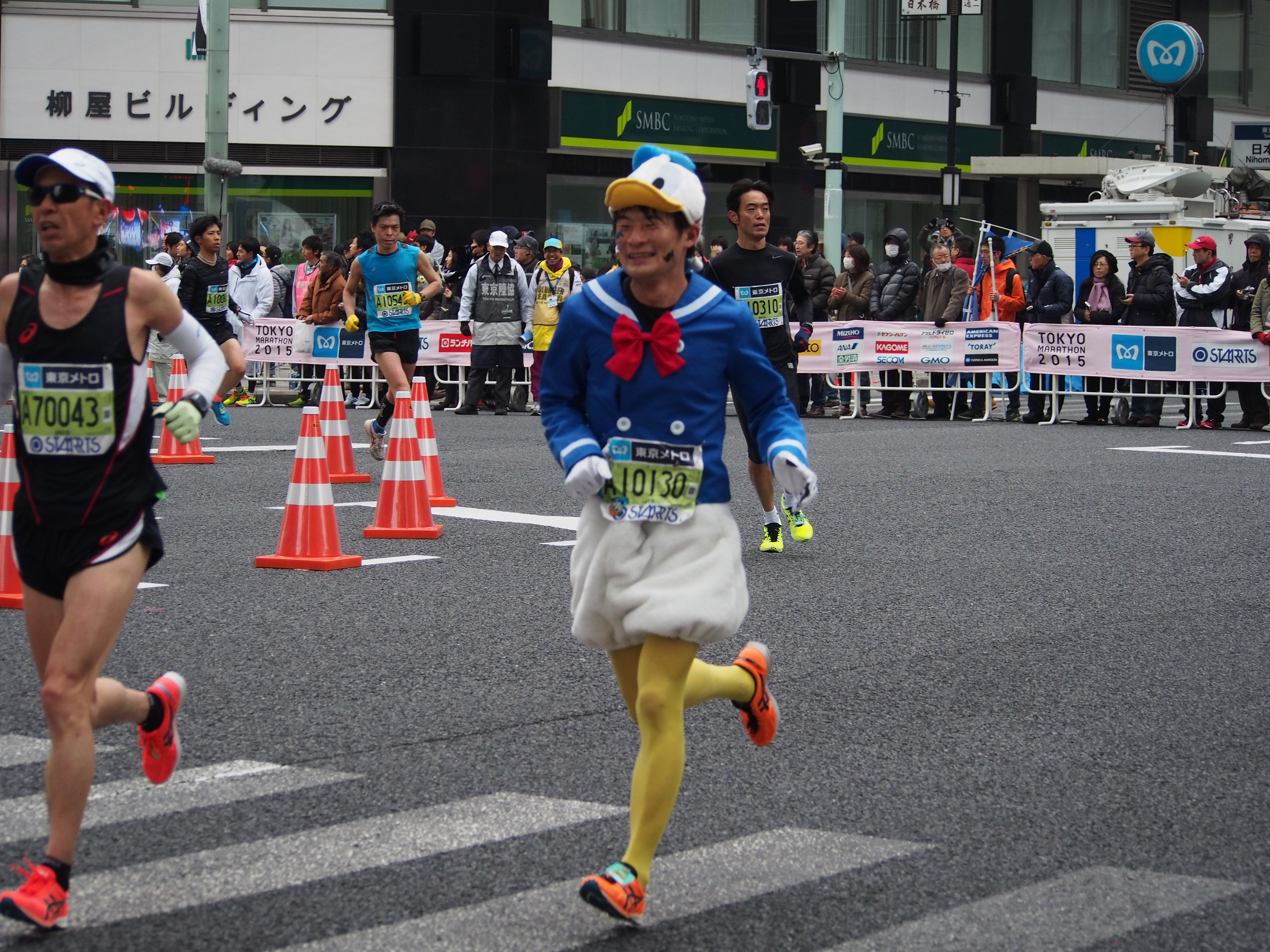
A fun runner during the race, wearing a Donald Duck costume

The elite race winners were both from Ethiopia – the first such time that athletes from the same nation won the men's and women's division. Endeshaw Negesse was just over twenty seconds off the course record with 2:06:00 hours while Berhane Dibaba took the women's title in 2:23:15. It was the first major marathon win for both athletes, although Berhane Dibaba had been runner-up in Tokyo the previous year. The reigning Olympic and world champion Stephen Kiprotich was runner-up in the men's race and Dickson Chumba was third, failing to defend his title. The women's podium was rounded out by Helah Kiprop (2014 winner of the Seoul International Marathon) and reigning Olympic champion Tiki Gelana. The 2014 women's champion, Tirfi Tsegaye did not return to defend her title. The fastest home athletes both finished in seventh position overall: Masato Imai in the men's and Madoka Ogi in the women's division.

As in the previous year, the wheelchair race was principally a national affair. Wakako Tsuchida defended her title while Kota Hokinoue—winner at the 2014 Berlin Marathon—won the men's wheelchair race for the first time.

== Results ==
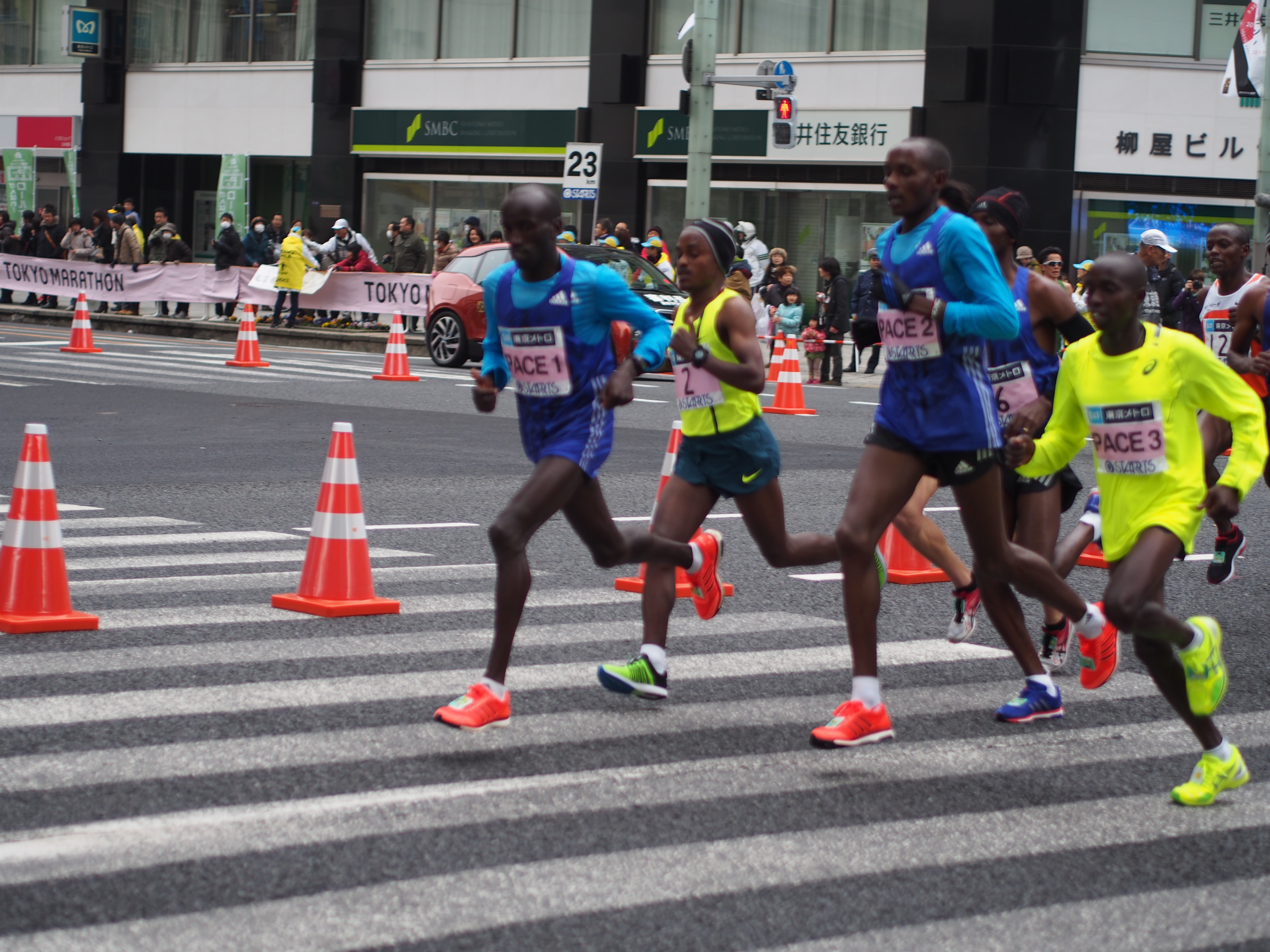
The leading pack of elite men during the race (Tsegaye Kebede is centre wearing number 2)

=== Elite men ===
Position	Athlete	Nationality	Time
1st place, gold medalist(s)	Endeshaw Negesse	Ethiopia	2:06:00
2nd place, silver medalist(s)	Stephen Kiprotich	Uganda	2:06:33
3rd place, bronze medalist(s)	Dickson Chumba	Kenya	2:06:34
4	Shumi Dechasa	Bahrain	2:07:20
5	Peter Some	Kenya	2:07:22
6	Markos Geneti	Ethiopia	2:07:25
7	Masato Imai	Japan	2:07:39
8	Tsegaye Kebede	Ethiopia	2:07:58
9	Hiroaki Sano	Japan	2:09:12
10	Benjamin Ngandu	Kenya	2:09:19
11	Koji Gokaya	Japan	2:09:21
12	Yared Asmerom	Eritrea	2:09:41

Other notable performers

- Ryo Yamamoto: 17th, 2:12:46
- Yuki Sato: 20th, 2:14:15
- Arata Fujiwara: 37th, 2:19:40

=== Elite women ===
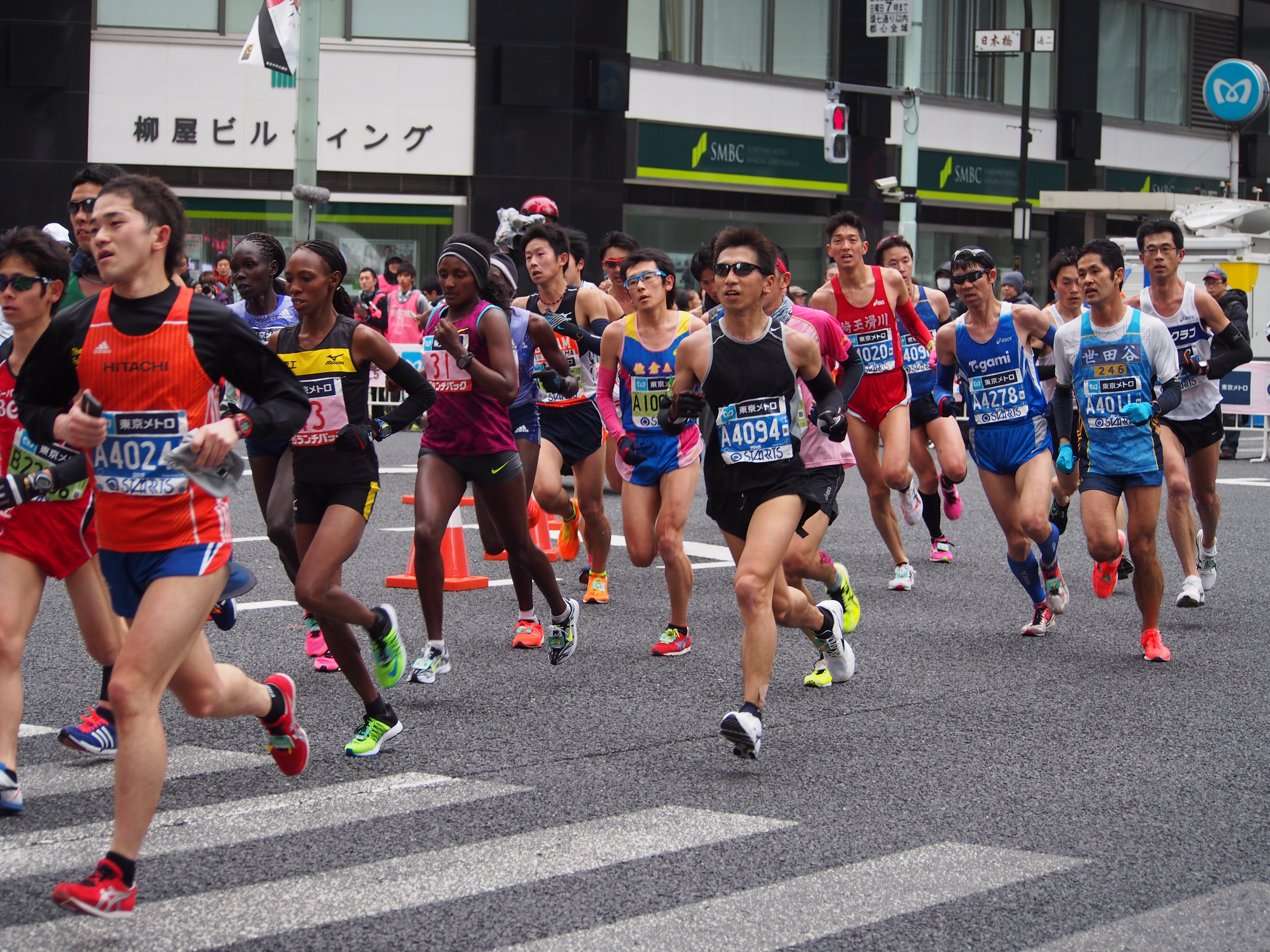
The leading women in the marathon race (Tiki Gelana is left of centre, wearing number 31)

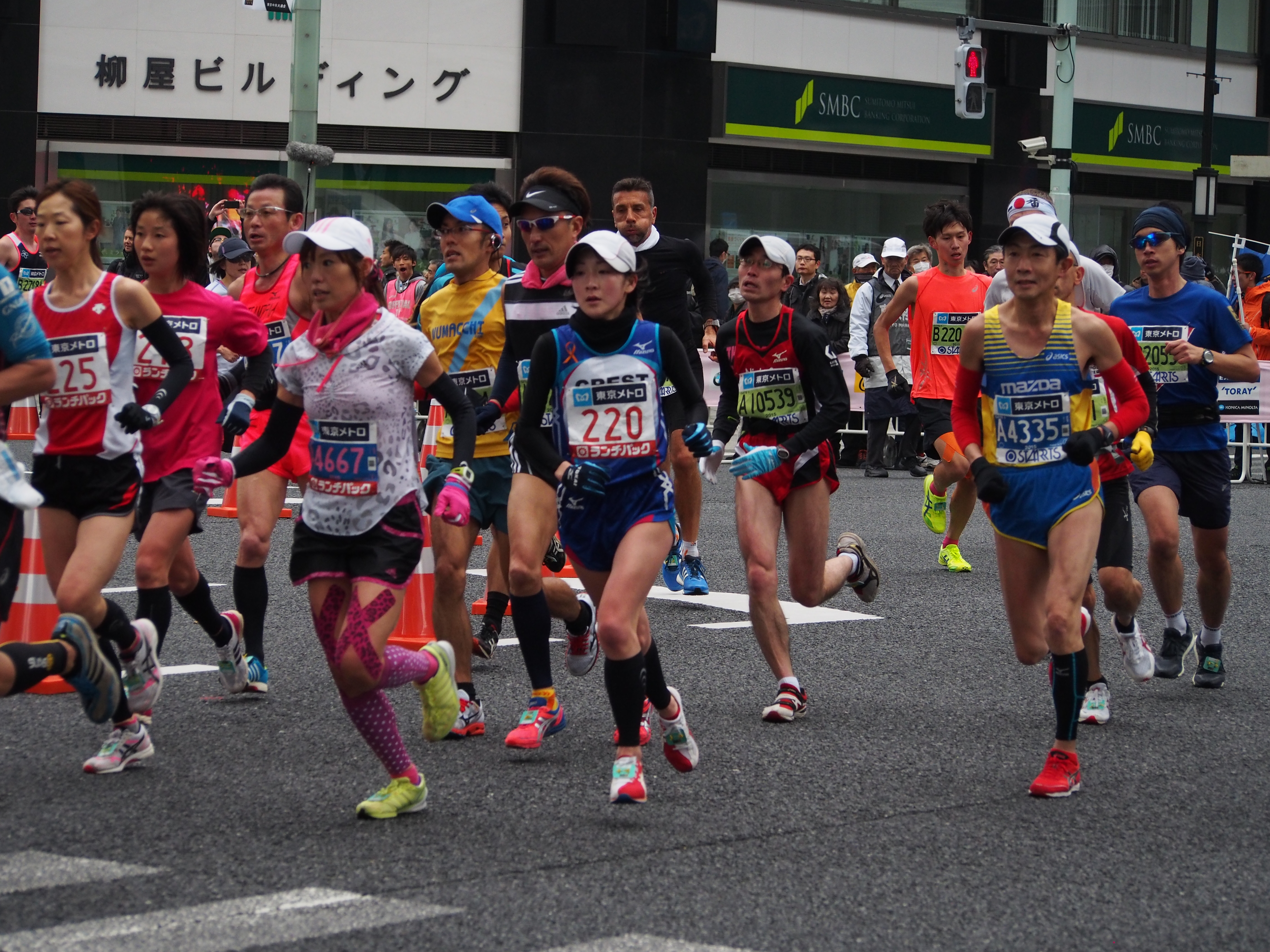
Elite Japanese women during the race

Position	Athlete	Nationality	Time
1st place, gold medalist(s)	Birhane Dibaba	Ethiopia	2:23:15
2nd place, silver medalist(s)	Helah Kiprop	Kenya	2:24:03
3rd place, bronze medalist(s)	Tiki Gelana	Ethiopia	2:24:26
4	Sally Chepyego Kaptich	Kenya	2:26:43
5	Flomena Cheyech Daniel	Kenya	2:26:54
6	Yeshi Esayias	Ethiopia	2:30:15
7	Madoka Ogi	Japan	2:30:25
8	Albina Mayorova	Russia	2:34:21
9	Yukari Abe	Japan	2:34:43
10	Yumiko Kinoshita	Japan	2:35:49
11	Lauren Kleppin	United States	2:37:13
12	Ayano Kondo	Japan	2:38:06

=== Men's wheelchair ===
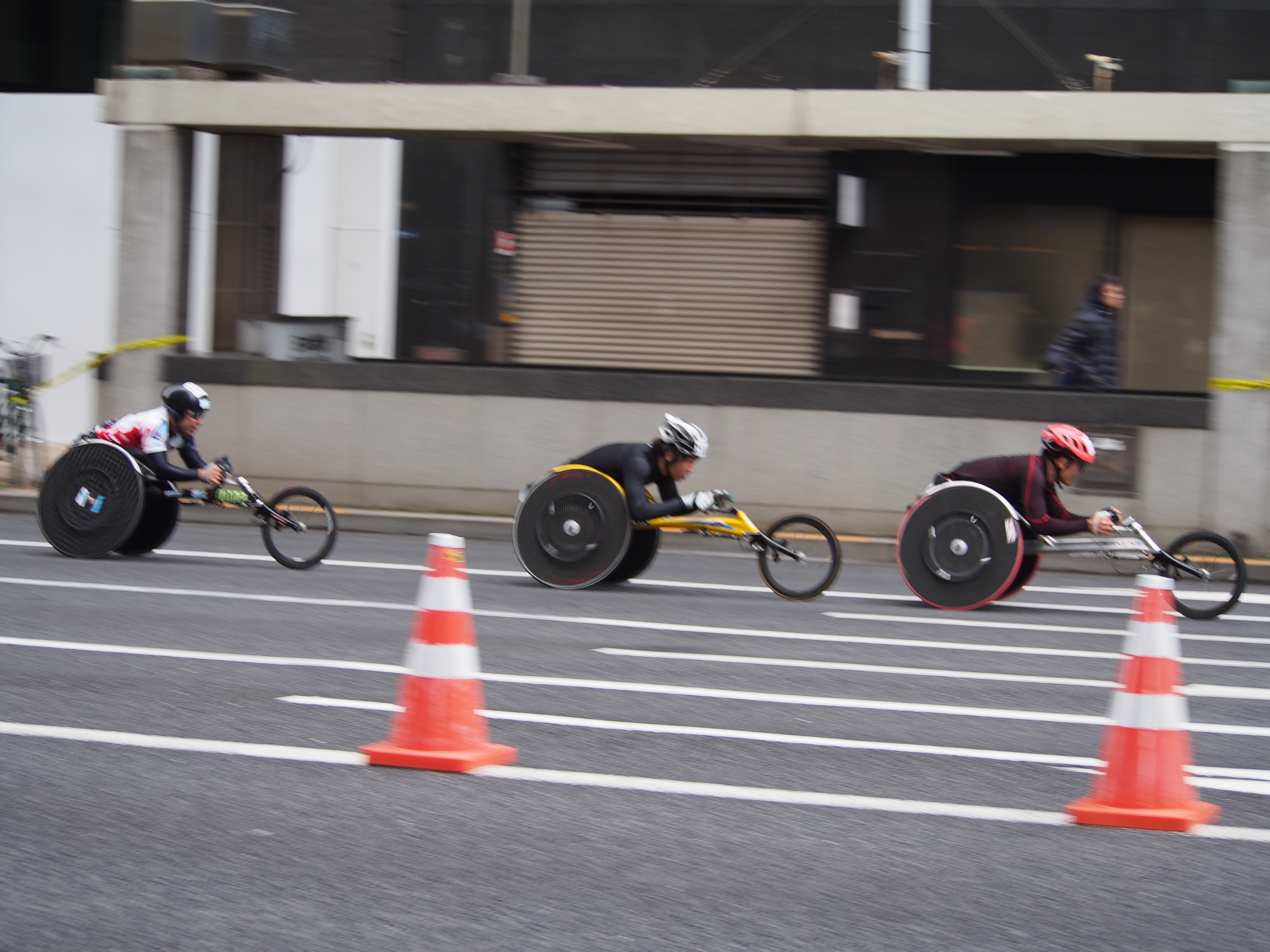
The leading men in the wheelchair race

Position	Athlete	Nationality	Time
1st place, gold medalist(s)	Kota Hokinoue	Japan	1:30:23
2nd place, silver medalist(s)	Tomoki Suzuki	Japan	1:30:36
3rd place, bronze medalist(s)	Yoshida Ryuta	Japan	1:30:36

=== Women's wheelchair ===
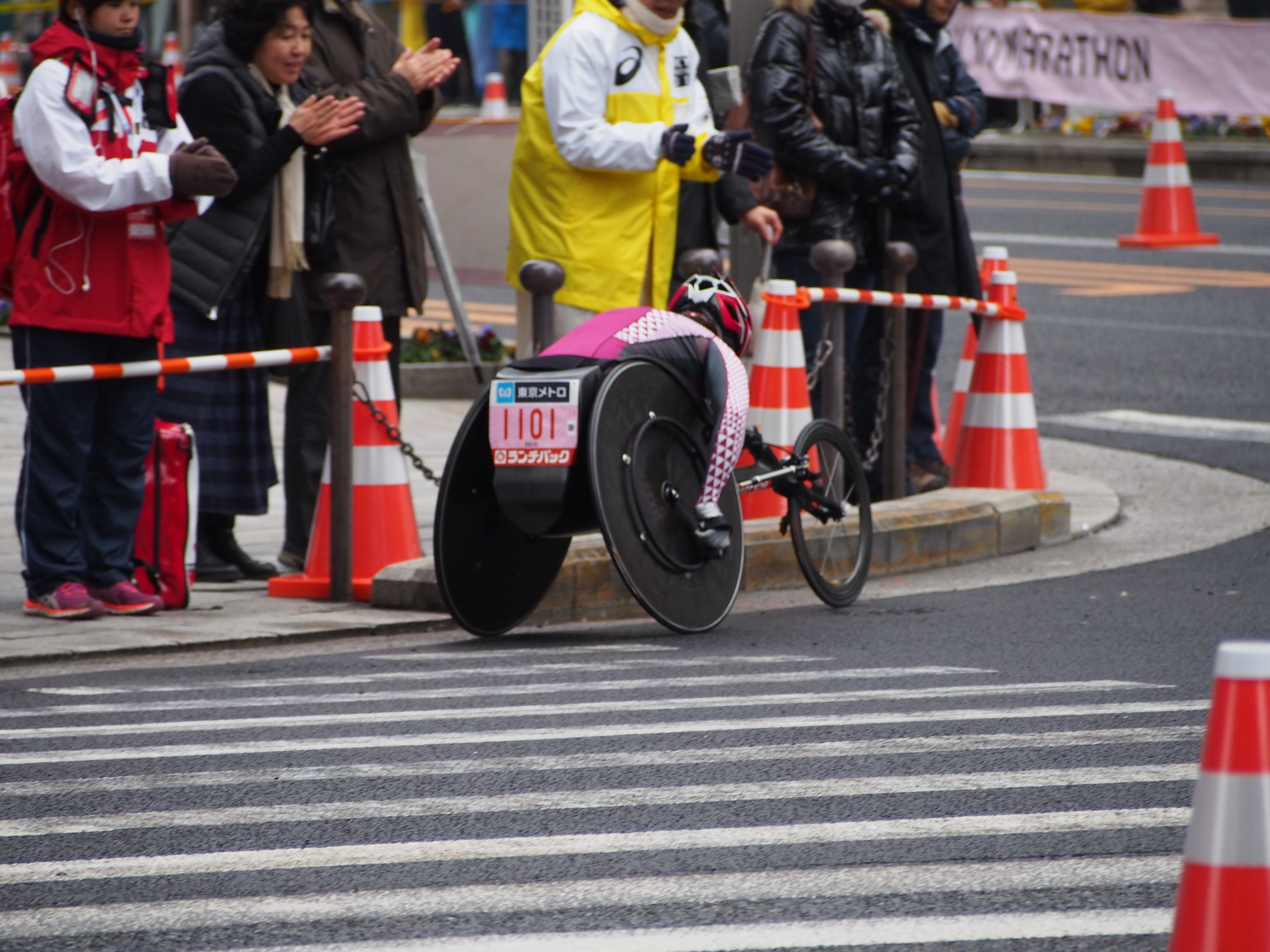
Defending champion Wakako Tsuchida was the sole elite women's wheelchair entrant

Position	Athlete	Nationality	Time
1st place, gold medalist(s)	Wakako Tsuchida	Japan	1:46:30
