= Nasukawa =

Nasukawa (written: 那須川) is a Japanese surname. Notable people with the surname include:

- Masahiro Nasukawa (那須川 将大, born 1986), Japanese footballer
- Mizuho Nasukawa (那須川 瑞穂, born 1979), Japanese long-distance runner
- Tenshin Nasukawa (那須川 天心, born 1998), Japanese kickboxer
