= 2008 Tokyo Marathon =

Sports Event

2nd Tokyo Marathon
- Venue: Tokyo, Japan
- Dates: 17 February

Champions
- Men: Viktor Röthlin (2:07:23)
- Women: Claudia Dreher (2:35:35)

The 2008 Tokyo Marathon (Japanese: 東京マラソン 2008) was the second edition of the annual marathon race in Tokyo, Japan and was held on Sunday, 17 February. The men's race was won by Switzerland's Viktor Röthlin in a time of 2:07:23, while the women's race was won by German Claudia Dreher in 2:35:35.

== Results ==
=== Men ===
Position	Athlete	Nationality	Time
1	Viktor Röthlin	Switzerland	2:07:23
2	Arata Fujiwara	Japan	2:08:40
3	Julius Gitahi	Kenya	2:08:57
4	Toshinari Suwa	Japan	2:09:16
5	Satoshi Irifune	Japan	2:09:40
6	Kurao Umeki	Japan	2:11:00
7	Seiji Kobayashi	Japan	2:11:02
8	Kazutoshi Takatsuka	Japan	2:11:05
9	Hiroyuki Horibata	Japan	2:11:47
10	Takashi Ota	Japan	2:12:10

=== Women ===
Position	Athlete	Nationality	Time
1	Claudia Dreher	Germany	2:35:35
2	Risa Mizutani	Japan	2:48:59
3	Yoshimi Kasezawa	Japan	2:51:18
4	Mineko Yamanouchi	Japan	2:52:02
5	Miyo Tanabe	Japan	2:52:07
6	Yuko Ishida	Japan	2:53:02
7	Yasuko Tsukamoto	Japan	2:53:53
8	Wu Wan-ling	Chinese Taipei	2:54:11
9	Keiko Hiyama	Japan	2:54:20
10	Hikaru Tanaka	Japan	2:54:45
