= Thomas Eller (marathon runner) =

German deaf marathon runner and teacher

Personal information
- Nationality: German
- Born: July 2, 1980 (age 45) Essen, Germany

Sport
- Sport: Athletics
- Event: Marathon

Achievements and titles
- Personal best: 2:47:11 (Berlin Marathon 2019)

Thomas Eller (born 2 July 1980) is a German deaf marathon runner, teacher and inclusion activist. He completed all six World Marathon Majors, culminating in Tokyo 2023, and has been described as the first deaf-born Six Star Medal finisher.

== Early life and education ==
Eller was born deaf in Essen, Germany. During his teacher-training studies in Cologne, he took up running as a way to cope with the strain of constant lip-reading. In 2018 he ran his first marathon in Petra, Jordan, finishing fourth.

== Marathon career ==
Eller set his personal best of 2:47:11 at the Berlin Marathon in 2019. In 2023 he completed the six World Marathon Majors, with his final star earned in Tokyo. He also participated in Paris’s mass-participation Marathon pour tous linked to the Olympic Games.

=== Selected results ===
- 2018: Petra Desert Marathon — fourth place.
- 2019: Berlin Marathon — personal best 2:47:11.
- 2023: Completed all six World Marathon Majors (final star in Tokyo).

== Advocacy and outreach ==
Eller works with the World Marathon Majors and individual race organizers to improve accessibility for deaf athletes, including official “Deaf Runner” back bibs, sign-language interpreting and captioned content. He has discussed barriers faced by deaf athletes and practical measures at mass events in interviews.

== Media coverage ==
In OCtober 2023, NBC Chicago wrote that Eller was “chasing marathon history” despite his hearing disability. He appeared in the Chicago Tribune’s 2023 marathon photo report and in an interactive The New York Times feature on Boston finishers. In 2024, InsideHook profiled Eller and his approach to long-distance running as a deaf athlete.

== Honours and recognition ==
- Completed the Six Star Medal at the Tokyo Marathon (2023).
- Featured by the World Marathon Majors in a long-form profile.
- Invited speaker on inclusion panels at the Chicago Marathon Expo (2023), the Berlin Marathon 50th-anniversary program (2024), and the Boston Marathon Expo (2025).

== Personal life ==
Eller teaches deaf children and teenagers at the LVR-David-Ludwig-Bloch School in Essen, Germany. His students have supported him at races, including during the Berlin Marathon program in 2024. In 2025 he was a torchbearer for the Rhine-Ruhr 2025 FISU World University Games flame relay in Essen.
