= Noriko Higuchi =

Japanese long-distance runner

Medal record

Women's athletics

Representing Japan

Asian Marathon Championships
Gold medal – first place	2011 Pattaya	Marathon

Noriko Higuchi (Japanese: 樋口 紀子; born 23 May 1985) is a female Japanese long-distance runner who specialised in marathon running. She won the Tokyo Marathon in 2011 in a career best of 2:28:49 hours and was Asian Marathon Champion in 2011.

From Kyoto, she began competing in road running competitions in Japan as a teenager. She placed eighth at the Sanyo Women's 10K in 2004, then placed third at the Kyoto City Half Marathon in her hometown in both 2005 and 2006. She attended Ritsumeikan University and ran collegiately, finishing first in her legs at the Japan Collegiate Ekiden Championships in 2006 and 2007, as well as being top on the collegiate leg at the 2007 Inter-Prefectural Women's Ekiden. Following her graduation she joined the Wacoal corporate running team.

Higuchi won the Shibetsu Half Marathon in 2008 and set a personal best of 1:12:19 hours at the Marugame Half Marathon the next year, though placing twelfth at the higher profile event. She continued to steadily improve with a best of 1:10:51 hours in Marugame in 2010 followed by a win at the Sendai Half Marathon. She was chosen to represent Japan at the 2010 IAAF World Half Marathon Championships and placed 29th, behind her compatriots Yoshimi Ozaki, Ryoko Kizaki and Hiroko Miyauchi, who won team bronze.

She made her marathon debut at the 2011 Osaka Women's Marathon, but failed to finish the distance. She gave a better performance at the Tokyo Marathon a month later, finishing in a time of 2:28:49 hours behind Russian Tatyana Aryasova. The Russian was subsequently disqualified for doping, making Higuchi the Tokyo champion. A runner-up finish behind Kenya's Elizabeth Chemweno at the Pattaya Marathon brought Higuchi her first regional title at the race served as the Asian Marathon Championships. On her fourth marathon race of the year, she slowed to a finish in 2:48:45 for twelfth in Hokkaido.

She was outclassed at the Nagoya Women's Marathon in 2012 placing 21st overall, but fared much better at the 2013 Osaka race, coming sixth. In her American debut, she led the field to win the Rock 'n' Roll Virginia Beach Half Marathon. She closed the year with eighth place at the Yokohama Women's Marathon. She won the Osaka Half Marathon in 2014 and was runner-up at the Kumanichi 30K. An outing at the 2014 Boston Marathon resulted in a time of 2:33:39 hours for 19th place. She continued competing abroad, with a tenth-place finish at the 2015 Vienna City Marathon. She did not compete over the marathon in the two following seasons, and her profile declined with top ten finishes at lower level Japanese races.

== International competitions ==
Year	Competition	Venue	Position	Event	Notes
2010	World Half Marathon Championships	Nanning, China	29th	Half marathon	1:14:56
2011	Asian Marathon Championships	Pattaya, Thailand	1st	Marathon	2:44:10
