= 1998 World Junior Championships in Athletics – Men's 10,000 metres =

The men's 10,000 metres event at the 1998 World Junior Championships in Athletics was held in Annecy, France, at Parc des Sports on 30 July.

== Medalists ==
Gold	Benson Barus; Kenya
Silver	Salim Kipsang; Kenya
Bronze	Alene Emere; Ethiopia

== Results ==
=== Final ===
30 July

Rank	Name	Nationality	Time	Notes
1st place, gold medalist(s)	Benson Barus	Kenya	29:24.28	
2nd place, silver medalist(s)	Salim Kipsang	Kenya	29:36.80	
3rd place, bronze medalist(s)	Alene Emere	Ethiopia	29:47.60	
4	Dereje Tadesse	Ethiopia	29:54.20	
5	Ovidiu Tat	Romania	29:59.24	
6	Jean-Berchmans Ndayisenga	Burundi	29:59.78	
7	Dmitriy Baranovskiy	Ukraine	30:19.16	
8	Jeffrey Gwebu	South Africa	30:27.29	
9	Jumanne Tuluway	Tanzania	30:32.74	
10	Tomoki Sugiyama	Japan	30:40.60	
11	Jean-Paul Niyonsaba	Burundi	30:46.22	
12	Radu Stroia	Romania	31:00.44	
13	Javier Carriqueo	Argentina	31:12.63	
14	Takhir Mamashayev	Kazakhstan	31:14.73	
15	Bart Evens	Belgium	31:28.75	
16	Karin Marin	Chile	31:30.23	
17	Alexander Lubina	Germany	31:41.31	
18	Guillaume Philippon	France	32:08.14	
19	Cordero Roy Vargas	Costa Rica	32:11.40	
20	Musa Mukomazi	Zimbabwe	32:17.34	
21	Edouard Burrier	France	32:58.49	
22	Chad Durham	United States	34:01.28	
	Martin Toroitich	Uganda	DNF	
	Lars Haferkamp	Germany	DNF	
	Justin Young	United States	DNF	
	Jesús Balboa	Bolivia	DNF	
	Giovanni Gualdi	Italy	DNF	
	Saïd Bérioui	Morocco	DQ	IAAF rule 141

== Participation ==
According to an unofficial count, 28 athletes from 21 countries participated in the event.

- Argentina (1)
- Belgium (1)
- Bolivia (1)
- Burundi (2)
- Chile (1)
- Costa Rica (1)
- Ethiopia (2)
- France (2)
- Germany (2)
- Italy (1)
- Japan (1)
- Kazakhstan (1)
- Kenya (2)
- Morocco (1)
- Romania (2)
- South Africa (1)
- Tanzania (1)
- Uganda (1)
- Ukraine (1)
- United States (2)
- Zimbabwe (1)
