= Endeshaw Negesse =

Ethiopian long-distance runner

Endeshaw Negesse Shumi (born 13 March 1988) is an Ethiopian long-distance runner who competes in the marathon. He won the Tokyo Marathon in 2015 and the Florence Marathon in 2012. His personal best is 2:04:52 hours.

He tested positive for doping (meldonium) in early 2016.

== Career ==
Endeshaw had his first international win at the Singelloop Breda in 2011. A half marathon debut followed in February 2012 and he made the top ten of the race in Barcelona. He made his debut over the marathon distance the following month and placed sixth at the Rome City Marathon with a time of 2:12:14 hours. He was victorious in his second outing, taking the Florence Marathon title with a new best of 2:09:59 hours. He quickly established himself among the world's fastest runners for the distance with a performance of 2:04:52 hours at the Dubai Marathon. Such was the calibre of the race, he only finished fourth overall, setting a record for the best performance for that finishing position. This moved him into the top twenty all-time for the marathon.

In the 2014 season, he struggled to recapture that form. He failed to finish at the Xiamen International Marathon, was a distant runner-up to Gilbert Yegon at the Düsseldorf Marathon in a time of 2:08:32, and was yet slower at the Shanghai Marathon, coming fourth. He took a high-profile win at the 2015 Tokyo Marathon, beating the reigning Olympic and world champion Stephen Kiprotich among others, and recorded the second-fastest time of his career at 2:06:00 hours. He was selected for the Ethiopian squad for the 2015 World Championships in Athletics as a result.

== Personal bests ==
- 15K run – 46:32 min (2011)
- Half marathon – 63:32 min (2012)
- Marathon – 2:04:52 hours (2013)

== Road race wins ==
- Breda Singelloop: 2011
- Florence Marathon: 2012
- Tokyo Marathon: 2015
