= 2007 Tokyo Marathon =

1st Tokyo Marathon
- Venue: Tokyo, Japan
- Dates: 18 February

Champions
- Men: Daniel Njenga (2:09:45)
- Women: Hitomi Niiya (2:31:02)

The 2007 Tokyo Marathon (Japanese: 東京マラソン 2007) was the inaugural edition of the annual marathon race in Tokyo, Japan and was held on Sunday, 18 February. The competition replaced the Tokyo International Marathon, an elite men-only competition held since 1981. The new competition included a mass race open to the public.

The men's race was won by Kenyan Daniel Njenga in a time of 2:09:45, while the women's race was won by home athlete Hitomi Niiya in 2:31:02. The organisers did not invite any elite level women runners to compete at the marathon, but Niiya (a national representative at under-20 level) started the race alongside members of the public for her marathon debut and finished nearly 19 minutes ahead of the opposition. Several older professional female runners in their 40s finished behind Niiya, with Mari Tanigawa (1991 winner of the Tokyo International Women's Marathon) finishing as runner-up, 1990s Olympic medalist Yuko Arimori in fifth, and ultradistance runner Mami Kudo in ninth.

== Results ==
=== Men ===
Position	Athlete	Nationality	Time
1	Daniel Njenga	Kenya	2:09:45
2	Tomoyuki Sato	Japan	2:11:22
3	Satoshi Irifune	Japan	2:12:44
4	Masashi Hayashi	Japan	2:15:28
5	Kazuyoshi Tokumoto	Japan	2:15:55
6	Vanderlei de Lima	Brazil	2:16:08
7	Seiji Kobayashi	Japan	2:17:13
8	Manabu Itayama	Japan	2:17:29
9	Koji Konan	Japan	2:18:03
10	Taye Moges	Ethiopia	2:18:20

=== Women ===
Position	Athlete	Nationality	Time
1	Hitomi Niiya	Japan	2:31:02
2	Mari Tanigawa	Japan	2:49:54
3	Tanaka Hikaru	Japan	2:50:02
4	Myanna Lennon	United Kingdom	2:52:05
5	Yuko Arimori	Japan	2:52:45
6	Yumiko Suda	Japan	2:55:31
7	Abe Michiyo	Japan	2:56:14
8	Junko Kataoka	Japan	2:56:20
9	Mami Kudo	Japan	2:57:03
10	Mitsuko Hirose	Japan	2:57:21
