= Kazuhiro Maeda =

Japanese long-distance runner (born 1981)

Kazuhiro Maeda (Japanese: 前田 和浩; born 19 April 1981) is a Japanese long-distance runner.

Born in Shiroishi, Saga, Maeda made his international debut at the 2000 World Junior Championships in Athletics, where he ran in the heats of the 5000 metres. He won the Karatsu 10-Miler in 2003. He was part of the Japanese men's team for the short race at the 2006 IAAF World Cross Country Championships. At the 2006 Asian Games he ran in the 5000 m and came in fourth place – however, he was the best Asian-born runner in the race as all the medallists were Kenyan emigrants to Qatar and Bahrain.

Maeda competed twice at world level for Japan in 2007: he finished seventeenth in the 10,000 metres at the 2007 World Championships and then came 30th at the 2007 IAAF World Road Running Championships in Udine. He made his marathon debut in 2009 at the Tokyo Marathon and he secured second place behind Salim Kipsang with a time of 2:11:01 hours. This automatically gained him a place for that year's World Championships team. He finished well off the pace at the 2009 World Championships Marathon, taking 39th place and crossing the line some eight minutes behind Japan's best performer Atsushi Sato.

Maeda came third at the 2011 Beppu-Ōita Marathon as the first Japanese home on the 60th anniversary of the race and improved his personal best time to 2:10:29 hours. He was the third Japanese runner to finish at the Fukuoka Marathon later that year, coming sixth overall. A personal best time of 2:08:38 hours came at the 2012 Tokyo Marathon, where his sixth-place finish (the second Japanese home) improved his Olympic selection chances. Ultimately he was not selected for the Olympics and he ran at that year's Amsterdam Marathon instead, although he only managed 15th place.

A new personal best of 2:08:00 came at the 2013 Tokyo Marathon, where he was the first Japanese with his fourth-place finish.

== Personal bests ==
- 5000 metres - 13:25.24 min (2008)
- 10,000 metres - 27:56.92 min (2007)
- Half marathon - 1:02:10 hrs (2007)
- Marathon - 2:08:00 hrs (2013)
