= Masakazu Fujiwara =

Japanese long-distance runner (born 1981)

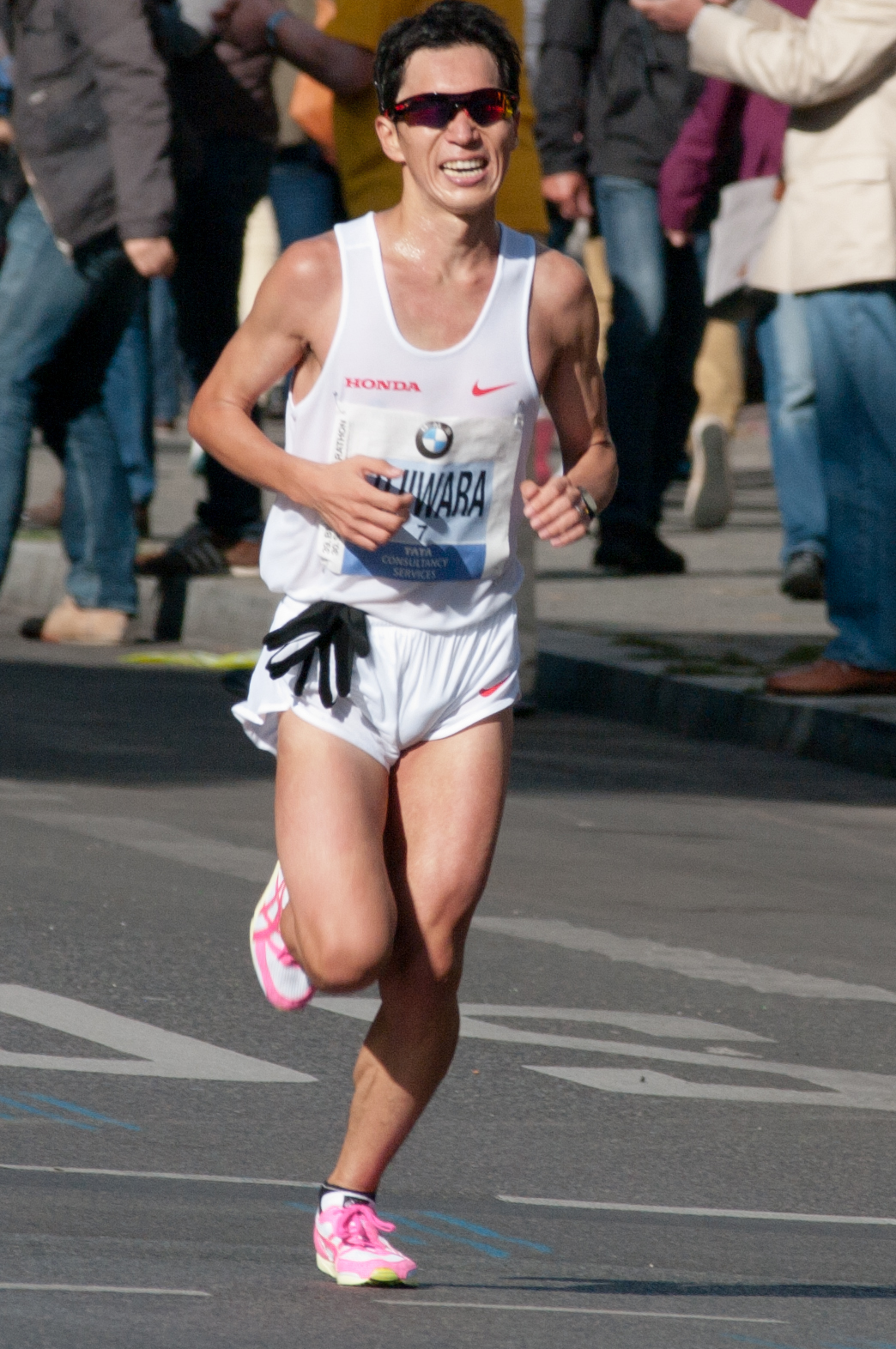
- Fujiwara at the 2012 Berlin Marathon

Personal information
- Born: 6 March 1981 (age 45) Ōkawachi, Hyōgo, Japan

Sport
- Sport: Marathon running
Medal record
Representing Japan
Summer Universiade
Gold medal – first place	2001 Beijing	Half marathon

Masakazu Fujiwara (Japanese 藤原正和, born 6 March 1981) is Japanese long-distance runner, who specializes in the marathon. He has a personal best of 2:08:12 hours for the event. He was the 2013 Japanese champion in the marathon and won the 2010 Tokyo Marathon. He trains at Honda Sports team.

He graduated from Chuo University, where he competed in track and field. He ran an Asian junior record of 28:17.38 minutes for the 10,000 metres. He participated four times in the Hakone Ekiden. He won the half marathon at the 2001 Summer Universiade in Beijing. In 2003 he began to compete in marathon, he finished third with a time of 2:08:12 at the 2003 Lake Biwa Marathon. This was the fastest ever debut for a Japanese runner. He represented Japan at the marathon at the 2003 World Championships in Athletics, but he could not complete the event due to a knee injury.

After this rapid ascent, he stagnated as a runner in the following years. Highlights of this period include a runner-up finish at the 2005 Ome 30 km Road Race and a fourth-place finish at the Asian Cross Country Championships in 2007, where he led Japan to the team bronze. He started well at the 2008 Lake Biwa Marathon but faded in the second half to ninth place.

His career began to turn around in 2010. That year he won the Tokyo Marathon with a time of 2:12:19 hours, beating his namesake Arata Fujiwara in wet conditions. He ran at the 2010 Berlin Marathon later that year and ranked in the top ten with a time of 2:12:00 hours (his best in seven years). He missed 2011 due to injury. On his return in 2012 he managed only 31st at the Tokyo Marathon but clocked 2:11:31 hours for tenth at the 2012 Berlin Marathon.

Ten years after his record debut run, he returned to Lake Biwa and dipped under two hours and ten minutes for the first time in a decade. His run of 2:08:51 was enough for fourth place and as the first Japanese he won his first national title in the marathon.

== Personal bests ==
- 5000 metres - 13:52.81 min (2007)
- 10,000 metres - 28:17.38 min (2000)
- Half marathon - 1:02:23 hrs (2004)
- Marathon - 2:08:12 hrs (2003)
