= Lonah Chemtai Salpeter =

Israeli long-distance runner (born 1988)

Lonah Chemtai Salpeter לונה צ'מטאי-סלפטר
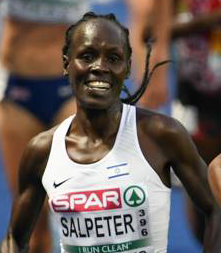
- Salpeter at the European Athletics Championships in 2018

Personal information
- Native name: לונה צ'מטאי-סלפטר
- Full name: Lonah Korlima Chemtai Salpeter
- National team: Israel
- Born: Lonah Korlima Chemtai; 12 December 1988 (age 37) Kapkanyar, Kenya
- Height: 1.65 m (5 ft 5 in)
- Weight: 52 kg (115 lb)
- Spouse: Dan Salpeter

Sport
- Country: Israel
- Sport: Athletics
- Events: Marathon, Half marathon, 10,000 metres, 5000 metres
- Club: Maccabi Tel Aviv
- Team: NN Running Team
- Coached by: Dan Salpeter

Achievements and titles
- Olympic finals: 2016 Rio de Janeiro; Marathon, DNF; 2021 Tokyo; Marathon, 66th
- World finals: 2022 Eugene; World Championship Marathon, Bronze
- Regional finals: 2018 Berlin; European Championships 10,000 m, Gold 2020 Tokyo; Marathon, Gold; 2022 New York; Marathon, Silver 2023 Boston; Marathon, Bronze
- Highest world ranking: 10,000 metre -- #1; marathon -- #2; one hour run -- # 2
- Personal bests: Road; Marathon: 2:17:45 NR (Tokyo 2020); Half marathon: 66:09 NR (Prague 2019); 10 km: 30:05 NR (Tilburg 2019)
Medal record
Women's athletics
Representing Israel
World Championships
Bronze medal – third place	2022 Eugene	Marathon
European Championships
Gold medal – first place	2018 Berlin	10,000 m
Bronze medal – third place	2022 Munich	10,000 m
European Running Championships
Silver medal – second place	2025 Brussels‑Leuven	Marathon team
Bronze medal – third place	2025 Brussels‑Leuven	Marathon
World Marathon Majors
Gold medal – first place	2020 Tokyo	Marathon
Silver medal – second place	2022 New York	Marathon
Bronze medal – third place	2023 Boston	Marathon

Lonah Korlima Chemtai Salpeter (Hebrew: לונה צ'מטאי-סלפטר, née Chemtai, born 12 December 1988) is an Israeli Olympic runner. Born in Kenya, she represents Israel internationally. She won the bronze medal in the marathon at the 2022 World Athletics Championships. At the European Athletics Championships in the 10,000 metres, Salpeter won the gold medal in 2018, and earned a bronze medal in 2022. She won the 2020 Tokyo Marathon, won the silver medal at the 2022 New York City Marathon, and finished third at the 2023 Boston Marathon.

Her personal best time for the marathon is 2:17:45, which Salpeter ran in 2020 and which made her the sixth-fastest female marathon runner in history (currently, she is the 11th), and set a new Israeli national record. Salpeter represented Israel at the 2016 Rio Olympics and the 2020 Tokyo Olympics. As of November 2022, she held six Israeli national records, over distances ranging from 3000 metres to the marathon.

Salpeter represented Israel at the 2024 Paris Olympics in the Women's marathon on 11 August 2024, and finished 8th.

== Early and personal life ==
Lonah Chemtai was born and raised in the small village of Kapkanyar, in West Pokot County, in the Rift Valley Province in western Kenya, a member of the Pokot tribe of the Kalenjin people. The members of the tribe speak the Pokot language and Swahili, are warriors, and do not like running—despite being good runners. She grew up living in a dwelling made of sheet metal, without electricity or running water. She has 12 siblings, and the members of the family had to walk down to a nearby river to fetch their water. Her school was four kilometers (2.5 miles) away from her home. In 2005, her father died, at 55 years of age, and Lonah helped her mother by tilling the land of the family farm, milking cows, cooking, washing, and fetching water from the river.

She came to Israel in December 2008 at 20 years of age, having never left her village previously, to work as a live-in nanny for the three children under five years of age of Kenya's Ambassador to Israel. The Ambassador's wife was initially away studying in Australia, but returned to the family in 2010. She lived and worked in Herzliya, near Tel Aviv.

She met Israeli running coach Dan Salpeter in 2011, when he was a university student. The two married in 2014, and she became pregnant later that year. The couple's son, Roy, was born in December 2014. The family resided in moshav Yanuv, in central Israel, and then in Shoham, also in central Israel.

She received support in her quest for Israeli citizenship from Kenya's Ambassador to Israel, Augostino Njoroge. He said that Kenya had plenty of marathon runners, and that he would be happy to have Salpeter run for Israel: "Kenya and Israel are so good friends. We cannot hand you the medal, but we can give you somebody who can bring the medal. This is what good friends are there for."

Shortly after, in March 2016, Salpeter became an Israeli citizen on account of her being married to an Israeli citizen, eight years after she began residing in Israel, and a few days before the cut-off to qualify for the 2016 Summer Olympics. The family now lives in Kibbutz Lehavot HaBashan in northern Israel.

== Running career ==
She began running in a local park in Herzliya as a hobby in 2010. She said: "When I started seeing people running in [Tel Aviv], I said to myself ‘I can be like them.’ Then I met my husband, and he was encouraging me and supporting me a lot."

Her husband, an Israeli former middle-distance and mountain runner, is also her coach. They met as she was casually running in a park. In her youth she ran shorter distances, and she only began running marathons after 2014. She says that runners face the challenge of learning how to handle pain, and she adds: "And losing. You train for months, and you are disappointed, but you need to take a challenge. You need to know where your weaknesses were, and the mistakes that you made."

Her club is Maccabi Tel Aviv. Salpeter trains 190-200 kilometers (118–124 miles) a week. She does not listen to music as she runs, saying "I always like to listen to my heart beating. Even though I'm running 42 kilometers, I run without music." Salpeter also revealed that "In a marathon I don't look at who I passed or who is passing me. I have a goal and I only see it." She said: "People tell me, ‘You inspire us, you make us proud,’ so that really motivates me a lot. I want to inspire the younger generation in Israel."

=== 2016–17; Tel Aviv Marathon gold and 2016 Olympics ===
Salpeter came in first among the women in the 2016 Tel Aviv Marathon in 2:40:16, almost five minutes below the qualification time for the 2016 Rio Olympics. It was the first time she had run a marathon.

Salpeter then competed for Israel at the 2016 Summer Olympics in the marathon. By the 30th kilometer, her time put her in the top half of the runners, ranking her approximately 90th. She left the race at the 35th kilometer, with sharp pain in her chest. On the advicae of officials in Brazil who thought that the baby might get sick, she had not brought her baby with her to Rio de Janeiro, and had stopped nursing it a few weeks before the race, resulting in her having extra breast milk and consequently problems with her chest. She explained on Facebook:

Unfortunately, I was forced to stop by a shoulder problem. As you all know, I'm still nursing my 20-month-old son. During my training in Kenya, I tried to stop, but it caused me pain and a shoulder problem due to running with breasts full of milk. This limited me in the European championships in Amsterdam (a half-marathon) and happened again today. I promise to attain respectable achievements in the future and am going forward with head held high.

In September 2016 Salpeter came in 11th in the 2016 Berlin Marathon in Germany, in 2:40:16.

In May 2017 she won the Berlin BIG 25 km race in Germany, in 1:28:48.

In June 2017, Salpeter won a silver medal in the 2017 European Athletics Team Championships Second League 5,000 metre race in Tel Aviv, Israel, as she ran a 16:19.90.

In August 2017, in the 2017 London World Championship Marathon, Salpeter ran a 2:40, coming in 41st.

=== 2018; Florence Marathon gold and European 10,000m champion ===
In May 2018, Salpeter won the 2018 European 10,000 m Cup in London, with a time of 31:33.03, a new Israeli national record. She was named the female European Athlete of the Month for May.

In June 2018, she won the Valencia 15 km, in Valencia, Spain, with a time of 47:38, a personal best and a new Israeli record.

In July 2018, Salpeter won the 1500 m at the Israeli National Championships, with a time of 4:11.69, a personal best.

That same month, she won the Guldensporenmeeting 5,000 metre race in Kortrijk, Belgium, with a time of 15:17.81.

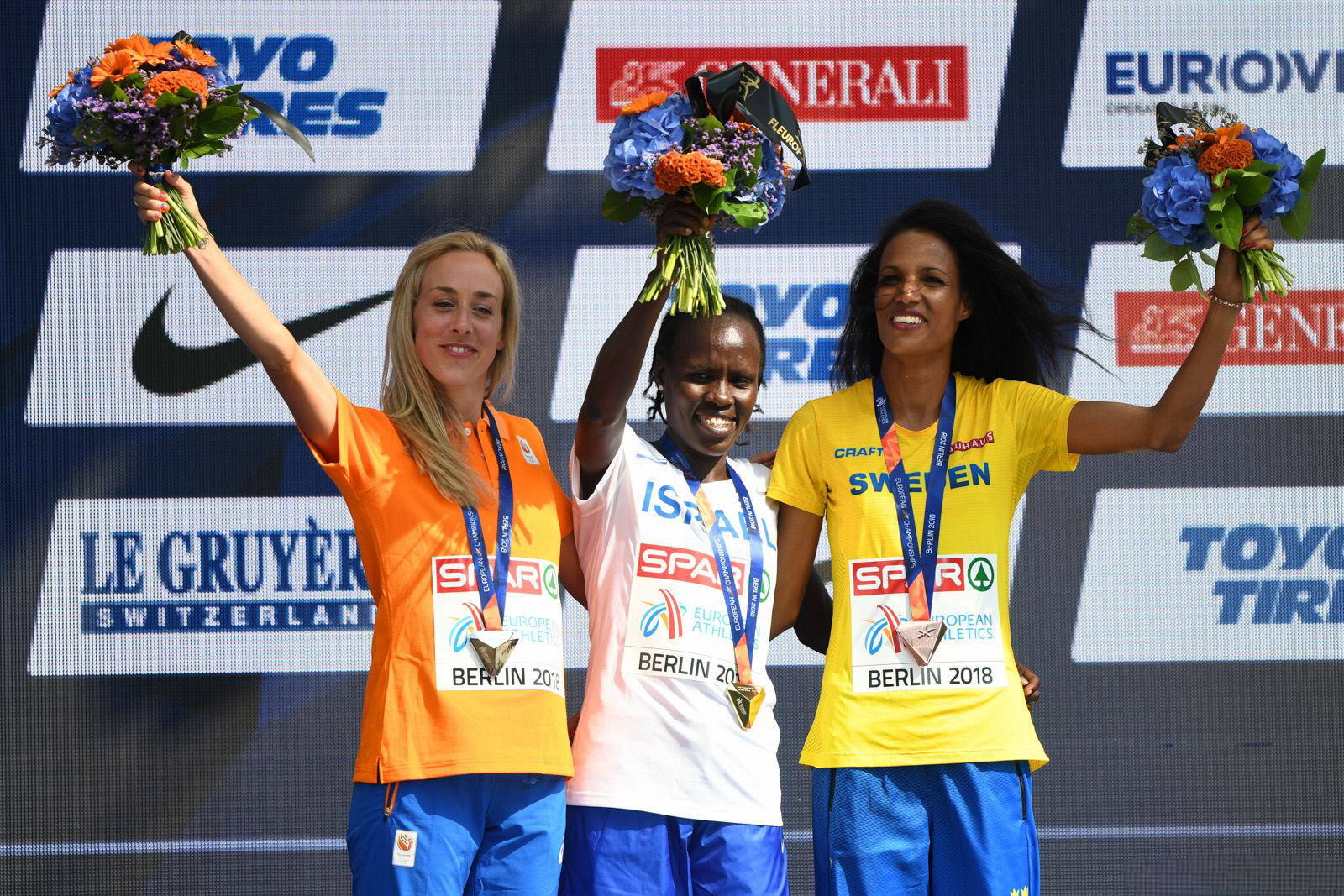
Salpeter (center) with her 10,000 m gold at the 2018 European Athletics Championships

On 8 August 2018, Salpeter won the 10,000 metres at the 2018 European Athletics Championships in Berlin, with a time of 31:43.29. She became the first Israeli athlete to win a gold medal at the championships.

Four days later, in the 5000 metres race in her second competition at the Championships, Salpeter miscounted the number of laps in the 12.5-lap race. As she and the other lead runners crossed the line, with her in close second place, she pulled up one lap early by mistake and veered off course 400 metres early, thinking she had just crossed the finish line. However, as race officials rang the bell indicating the start of the final lap, Salpeter realized her error, and sprinted after the leader. The gap was too large for her to close, however, and she finished in fourth place, in a time of 15:01. Nevertheless, her time was a new Israeli record, breaking the old one by 17 seconds. After finishing she collapsed on the grass, crying, and in her post-race interview only managed to say: "What a fool I am." An hour after the conclusion of the race, race officials disqualified her for having crossed lanes on the track.

In September 2018, Salpeter won the Dam tot Damloop 10-mile race in Amsterdam, the Netherlands, with a time of 50:45. She won by one second, and also won the gender pursuit race by 35 seconds over Joshua Cheptegei. It was the first time that she ran the distance.

In October 2018 she won a silver medal in the Lisbon Half Marathon in Portugal, in 1:07:55.

On 25 November 2018, Salpeter won the Florence Marathon, setting an Israeli national record and course record of 2:24:17. She broke the prior course record by four minutes, and was six minutes ahead of the second-place finisher Caroline Chepkwony. She ran a negative split, running the first half of the race in 1:12:38, and the second half in 1:11:39. It was only her fifth marathon.

In December 2018, she won the Roma We Run Rome 10K in Rome, Italy, in a time of 31:46.

=== 2019; Prague Marathon gold ===
In February 2019, Salpeter won the Or Yehuda 5K Race in Tel Aviv, with a time of 15:15, a personal best.

That same month she won the Israeli 15 km Championships in Rishon LeZion, with a time of 48:42.

In March 2019, Salpeter won the Roma-Ostia Half Marathon in Rome, Italy, with a time of 1:06:40. She was two seconds off the course record.

In April 2019, she came in second in the Prague Half Marathon in Prague, the Czech Republic, with a time of 1:06:09, a personal best.

On 5 May 2019, Salpeter won the Prague Marathon, with a course record 2:19:46 time, breaking the old course record by over two minutes. She clocked the 24th-best time for a woman in that distance in history, the third-best European time ever, and a new Israeli national record. She ran a negative split, running the first half in 70:12, and—despite the wind increasing—the second half in 69:33. She moved to third on the European all-time list in the marathon, behind world record-holder Paula Radcliffe (2:15:25) and Irina Mikitenko (2:19:19).

Also in May 2019, she won the silver medal in the European Champion Clubs Cup ECCC Group B 1,500 metre race in Tampere, Finland, in 4:20.51. She was named the female European Athlete of the Month for May 2019.

In July 2019, she won a silver medal in the 2019 European 10,000 m Cup in London, with an Israeli national record of 31:15.78, seven seconds behind Steph Twell.

In August 2019 Salpeter won a gold medal in the 2019 European Athletics Team Championships Second League 5,000 metre race, in Varaždin, Croatia, in a time of 15:44.38.

In September 2019 at the Tilburg Ten Miles in the Netherlands, as Salpeter won the gold medal, she set a new Israeli record, and broke the European record in the 10 kilometres with a time of 30:04, the second-fastest women's time ever recorded for the distance, slicing 17 seconds off the previous record set by Paula Radcliffe in 2003.

On 28 September 2019, Salpeter ran in the women's marathon at the 2019 World Athletics Championships in Doha, Qatar. She was forced to leave the race after 32 kilometers (20 miles) while she was in fifth place and 11 seconds behind the lead runner, as temperatures rose to 91 °F (32.7 °C), along with humidity of 73% that made it feel like 105 °F (40 °C). In all, 28 out of 68 runners (41%) failed to finish the race.

In December 2019 she won the Israeli Half Marathon Championships in Beit She'an, with a time of 1:10:05.

=== 2020; Tokyo Marathon gold at 2:17:45 ===
In March 2020, Salpeter won the gold medal in the 2020 Tokyo Marathon with a time of 2:17:45, setting a new course and Israeli record, and medalling in her first World Marathon Major. She broke away from the women's field at the 30-kilometer mark, and broke the course record by over two minutes. She ran the sixth-fastest women's marathon in the world of all time.

In July 2020, she won the 800 metre Israeli Championship in Tel Aviv with a time of 2:06.63, a personal best, and the 1,500 metre Israeli Championship with a time of 4:17.96.

In September 2020, Salpeter won the silver medal in the One Hour Memorial Van Damme in Brussels, Belgium, with a distance of 18,571 metres.

In December 2020, she won the Israeli Half Marathon Championships with a time of 1:13:38.

=== 2021; 2020 Tokyo Olympics marathon ===
In January 2021, Salpeter won the Yarkon Park 5 km Road Race in Tel Aviv, with a time of 15:28.

In February 2021, she won the Tuscany Camp Half Marathon in Siena, Italy, with a time of 1:07:09.

On 14 March 2021, Salpeter won the Agmon Hahula Marathon in Hula Valley with a time of 2:22:37, and qualified to represent Israel at the delayed 2020 Tokyo Summer Olympics. She ran negative splits, running 71:31 in the first half, and 71:06 in the second half.

On 6 August 2021, after running in the leading pack runners for most of the race, Salpeter came in 66th in the women's marathon at the 2020 Tokyo Olympic Games with a time of 2:48:31. She was in the front pack of runners with four kilometers (2.5 miles) to go, in a battle for the bronze medal with Molly Seidel, when she had to pause due to severe pain from intense menstrual cramps. She only started running again 20 minutes later, finished 21 minutes behind the winner Peres Jepchirchir, and said: "I will never give up, so I need to cross the finish line. I tried my best." Shortly after the marathon ended, she said: "I was really proud to represent Israel, I was going today to fight for any medal. I apologize that I didn't win," before breaking into tears and walking away from the interview. When asked about the problem, she looked at the only female reporter in the crowd and said, “You understand.” She explained further:

Women — we struggle sometimes with this kind of situation, Not every day is good for us because every month we receive this period and some ladies, they’re ok with it, and some are not good with it. This is our nature, so [some women], they don’t feel comfortable to say it. I also feel uncomfortable saying it, but I say it’s nature, I don’t have to hide anything just because the men cannot feel the way we feel.

Two days later Salpeter said she does not live life with regrets, and was already looking ahead to the future. "I don't have regrets, because I just take my life like a book. I already came from that page from yesterday, so I need to open another page to see what is going on in the future. If I look back, I will be mentally destroyed."

In October 2021 she came in fifth in the 2021 London Marathon with a time of 2:18:54. Her time was just over a minute after first-place winner Joyciline Jepkosgei, and just 36 seconds after third-place finisher Ashete Bekere.

In December 2021, she won the bronze medal in the San Silvestre Vallecana 10K in Madrid, Spain with a time of 31:14.

That month Salpeter also won the Tiberias Half Marathon in Israel, with a time of 1:11:35.

=== 2022; New York City Marathon silver and World Championships bronze ===
In March 2022, Salpeter won a silver medal in the Nagoya Women's Marathon, in Nagoya, Japan, with a time of 2:18:45. She ran a negative second half split of 1:08:58, compared to her first half split of 1:09:47, as she finished with a time that was faster than the previous event record.

In April 2022, she won the Israeli 10,000m Championships in Tel Aviv, with a time of 31:49.75.

In May 2022, she won the 5,000 metres Maccabi Idelson Cup in Tel Aviv, with a time of 16:10.13.

In July 2022, Salpeter won a bronze medal in the 2022 World Athletics Championships marathon in Eugene, Oregon, with a time of 2:20:18. She started surging in the last third of the race, and said: "“The marathon starts at 30km." She accepted the medal while wearing the Israeli flag draped across her back, and said: "I'm so proud to represent my country".

In August 2022, Salpeter won the bronze medal for Israel at the 2022 European Athletics Championships in Munich, Germany, in the 10,000 metres race, and set an Israeli record with a time of 30:36:37.

In November 2022, Salpeter won the silver medal at the 2022 New York City Marathon, with a time of 2:23:30, only seven seconds behind the winner Sharon Lokedi. On an unseasonably warm and humid day for New York City, she had been in the lead for most of the last few miles, and was only passed by Lokedi in the final mile. She had been dealing with sensitivity in one of her inner thigh muscles for several months. After the race she said: "I always, whatever race I do, I always remember my nation. I need to run for them! Back in Israel, every race is my way to say thank you. Thank you to Israel!” It was the first time she had run the New York City Marathon.

As of that month, she held Israeli national records for 1500, 3000, 5000, and 10,000 metres, as well as for the half marathon.

=== 2023; Boston Marathon bronze ===
In February 2023, Salpeter won the Tel Aviv 10K with a time of 31:20. She said: "For me, it is a great honor to make my country proud in every race that I compete in."

In March 2023 she won the silver medal in the Roma-Ostia Half Marathon, in Rome, Italy, in 1:06:56, 35 seconds behind the gold medal winner.

In April 2023, Salpeter won the bronze medal in the 2023 Boston Marathon, in Boston, Massachusetts, in a time of 2:21:57, 19 seconds behind the gold-medal winner and two-time world champion Hellen Obiri. She led the pack of runners until the final two miles. It was the first time she had run the Boston Marathon.

In May 2023, Salpeter won the 5,000 metres Maccabi Idelson Cup in Tel Aviv with a time of 16:52.10.

In June 2023, she won the silver medal in the 5,000 metres 2023 European Athletics Team Championships Third Division in Chorzów, Poland, with a time of 15:36.07.

Also in June 2023 she won the Hamburg Half Marathon, in Hamburg, Germany, in 1:10:05.

In August 2023 Salpeter came in fourth in the 2023 World Athletics Championships in Budapest, Hungary, running it in 2:25:38.

In November 2023, she won the silver medal in the 15K Zevenheuvelenloop, in Nijmegen, in the Netherlands, with a time of 47:55, 43 seconds behind gold medal winner and world champion Beatrice Chepkoech. Thereafter, and injury sidelines her for most of the next year.

=== 2024; Paris Olympics ===
Salpeter was chosen to be Israel's female flag-bearer at the Opening Ceremony of the Olympic Games on 26 July 2024.

Salpeter represented Israel at the 2024 Paris Olympics in the Women's marathon. After leading at the halfway mark, she finished 8th with a time of 2:26:08, three minutes and 13 seconds behind gold medal winner Sifan Hassan of the Netherlands. She said: "I fought for the flag of my country, I wanted it to fly high.... I wanted to support people in my own way. I wanted to be on the podium for the people in Israel.... My goal now is to stay healthy and reach Los Angeles in 2028."

== Achievements ==
=== International competitions ===
Representing Israel
Year	Competition	Venue	Position	Event	Notes
2016	European Championships	Amsterdam, Netherlands	40th	Half marathon	1:15:22
2016	Olympic Games	Rio de Janeiro, Brazil	DNF	Marathon	—
2016	European Cross Country Championships	Chia, Italy	38th	Senior race	27:04
2017	European 10,000m Cup	Minsk, Belarus	8th	10,000 m	33:20.16
2017	World Championships	London, United Kingdom	41st	Marathon	2:40:22
2017	European Cross Country Championships	Šamorín, Slovakia	50th	Senior race	28:56
2018	World Half Marathon Championships	Valencia, Spain	12th	Half marathon	1:08:58 NR
2018	European 10,000m Cup	London, United Kingdom	1st	10,000 m	31:33.03 NR
2018	European Championships	Berlin, Germany	1st	10,000 m	31:43.29
2018	European Championships	Berlin, Germany	DQ	5000 m	~~15:01.02~~
2019	European 10,000m Cup	London, United Kingdom	2nd	10,000 m	31:15.78 NR
2019	World Championships	Doha, Qatar	DNF	Marathon	—
2020	World Half Marathon Championships	Gdynia, Poland	12th	Half marathon	1:08:31 SB
2021	Olympic Games	Sapporo, Japan	66th	Marathon	2:48:31
2022	World Championships	Eugene, OR, United States	3rd	Marathon	2:20:18
2022	European Championships	Munich, Germany	3rd	10,000 m	30:46.37 NR
2023	Hamburg Half Marathon	Hamburg, Germany	1st	Half marathon	1:10:05
2023	World Championships	Budapest, Hungary	4th	Marathon	2:25:38
2024	Olympic Games	Paris, France	8th	Marathon	2:26:08
2025	European Running Championships	Brussels–Leuven, Belgium	3rd	Marathon	2:28:01
2025	World Championships	Tokyo, Japan	–	Marathon	DNF
Road races
2016	Tel Aviv Marathon	Tel Aviv, Israel	1st	Marathon	2:40:16
2016	Berlin Half Marathon	Berlin, Germany	8th	Half marathon	1:14:11
2016	Berlin Marathon	Berlin, Germany	11th	Marathon	2:40:16
2017	25 Berlin	Berlin, Germany	1st	25 kilometres	1:28:48
2018	Dam tot Damloop	Amsterdam, Netherlands	1st	10 miles	50:45
2018	Lisbon Half Marathon	Lisbon, Portugal	2nd	Half marathon	1:07:55 NR
2018	Florence Marathon	Florence, Italy	1st	Marathon	2:24:17 NR
2019	Roma-Ostia Half Marathon	Rome, Italy	1st	Half marathon	1:06:40 NR
2019	Prague Half Marathon	Prague, Czech Republic	2nd	Half marathon	1:06:09 NR
2019	Prague Marathon	Prague, Czech Republic	1st	Marathon	2:19:46 NR
2019	Tilburg Women's 10K	Tilburg, Netherlands	1st	10 km	30:05 AR
2019	Frankfurt Marathon	Frankfurt, Germany	4th	Marathon	2:23:11
2020	Tokyo Marathon	Tokyo, Japan	1st	Marathon	2:17:45 NR
2021	London Marathon	London, United Kingdom	5th	Marathon	2:18:54
2022	Nagoya Women's Marathon	Nagoya, Japan	2nd	Marathon	2:18:45
2022	Lisbon Half Marathon	Lisbon, Portugal	4th	Half Marathon	1:08:33
2022	New York City Marathon	New York, NY, United States	2nd	Marathon	2:23:30
2023	Boston Marathon	Boston, MA, United States	3rd	Marathon	2:21:57

=== Personal bests ===
- 3000 metres – 8:42.88 (Birmingham 2018) NR
- 5000 metres – 14:59.02 (London 2019)
- 10,000 metres – 30:46.37 (Munich 2022) NR
- One hour run – 18,571 metres (Brussels 2020) NR
- 10 km – 30:05 (Tilburg 2019) NR
- Half marathon – 1:06:09 (Prague 2019) NR
- Marathon – 2:17:45 (Tokyo 2020) NR

== See also ==
- List of Israeli records in athletics
- List of winners of the Tokyo Marathon
- List of World Athletics Championships medalists (women)
- Sports in Israel
