= Mizuho Nasukawa =

Japanese long-distance runner

Medal record

Women's athletics

Representing Japan

Asian Athletics Championships
Bronze medal – third place	2002 Colombo	1500 m
Bronze medal – third place	2002 Colombo	5000 m

Mizuho Nasukawa (Japanese: 那須川 瑞穂; born 22 November 1979) is a female Japanese former long-distance runner. She won the Tokyo Marathon in 2009 in a personal best of 2:25:38 hours. She represented Japan at the IAAF World Cross Country Championships in 2000 and was also twice a medallist at the Asian Athletics Championships.

== Career ==
From Ōshū, Iwate, she attended high school in Iwate Prefecture and took up running there. She gained international selection for the 2000 IAAF World Cross Country Championships and was the team's best performer in 50th place in the short race. Following graduation from high school, she joined a corporate team, training under Yoshio Koide at Sekisui Chemical. She later moved to run for Aruze (now Universal Entertainment Corporation). She won the 3.3 km leg at the All-Japan Women's Corporate Ekiden Championships in both 2000 and 2001.

Nasukawa had her first international success at the 2002 Asian Athletics Championships, where she was a double bronze medallist in the 1500 metres and 5000 metres. She represented Asia at the 2002 IAAF World Cup in the 3000 metres, but finished last in her race. She shifted into longer-distance road running and set a half marathon best of 1:11:58 hours in Kobe in 2003, taking third place. She enjoyed a successful marathon debut at the 2004 Osaka Women's Marathon, finishing in fourth place with 2:29:49 hours. She dropped to eighth place on her return to the race in 2005, however.

She ranked highly on the track at the Japanese National Games, placing in the top three over 5000 m in 2004, 2006, 2007 and 2008. A career breakthrough came at the 2009 Tokyo Marathon, which she won in a lifetime best of 2:25:38 hours. She stuck to the longer distance, but managed only seventh at the Hokkaido Marathon (2:34:17). An improved performance came at the 2009 Chicago Marathon, where her finish in 2:29:22 hours brought her fifth place. Continuing mixed fortunes, Nasukawa was out of the top twenty in her attempted defence at the Tokyo Marathon, but took third at that year's Hokkaido Marathon.

She was scheduled to run the Nagoya Women's Marathon to attempt to make the Japanese national team, but the race was called off following the 2011 Tōhoku earthquake and tsunami. Her hometown Oshu was badly affected and an old training partner of hers was killed alongside her daughter. Though deeply affected, Nasukawa vowed to run at the 2011 London Marathon, which had offered to host the national selection race. In London she placed 18th overall in a time of 2:30:00 hours and did not make the Japanese Olympic team. She gave strong performances in 2012, running 2:28:44 hours for twelfth at the Nagoya Marathon, winning the Rock 'n' Roll Denver Marathon, and being runner-up to Lydia Cheromei at the Yokohama Women's Marathon with 2:26:42 hours (the second fastest of her career). Good form continued with a run of 2:30:27 for fourth at the 2013 Yokohama race.

Nasukawa's career wound down thereafter. She won the 2015 low-profile Boulder Backroads Marathon, was down in 37th at the 2016 Nagoya Marathon, before finally calling time on her professional career with a time of 2:33:16 for fifth at the Saitami Women's Marathon.

== International competitions ==
Year	Competition	Venue	Position	Event	Notes
2000	World Cross Country Championships	Vilamoura, Portugal	50th	Short race	13:49
2000	World Cross Country Championships	Vilamoura, Portugal	13th	Short race team	251 pts
2002	Asian Championships	Colombo, Sri Lanka	3rd	1500 m	4:19.27
2002	Asian Championships	Colombo, Sri Lanka	3rd	5000 m	16:24.63
2002	IAAF World Cup	Madrid, Spain	9th	3000 m	9:23.47
