= Alevtina Biktimirova =

Russian long-distance runner

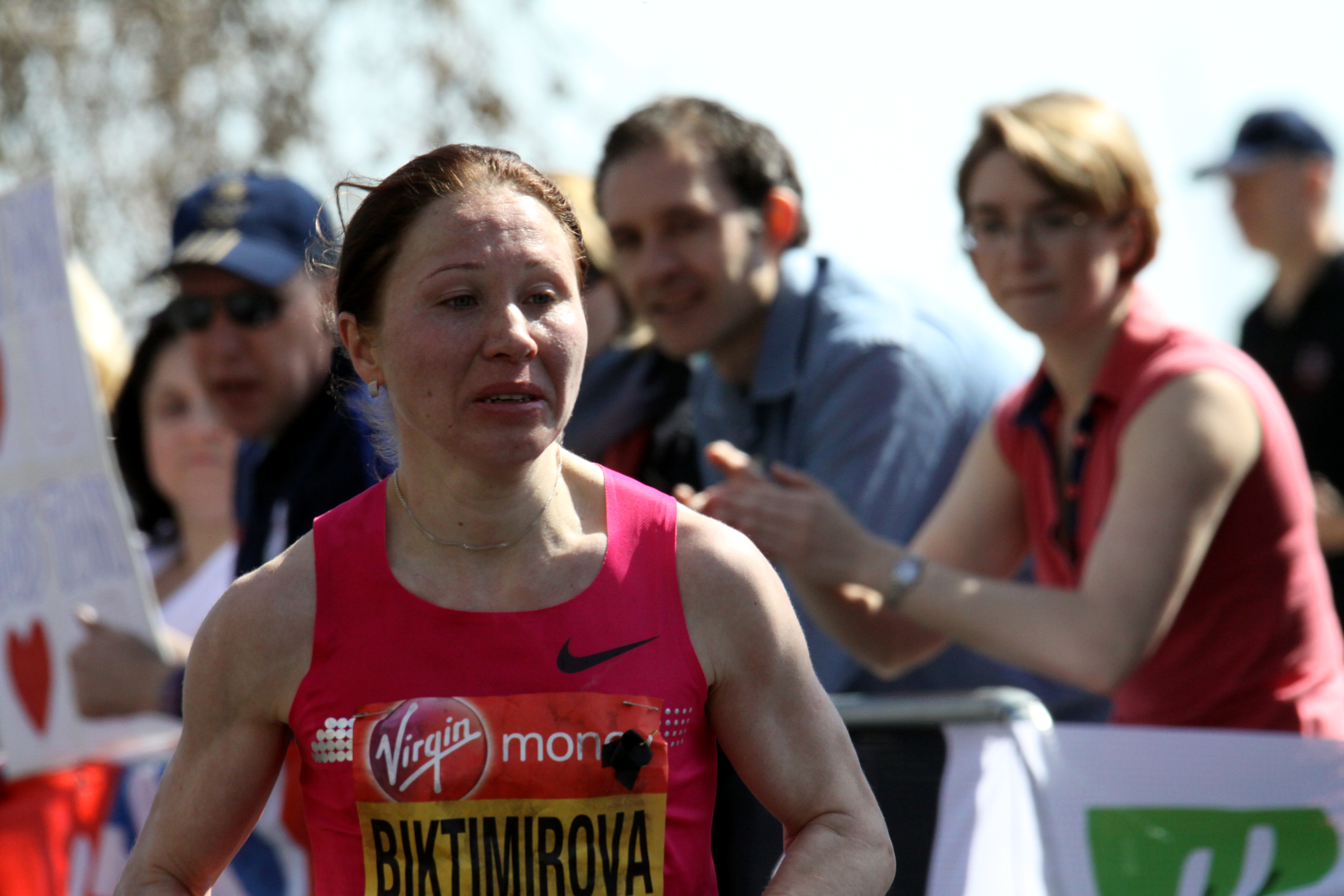
Biktimirova at the 2013 London Marathon

Alevtina Biktimirova (born September 10, 1982) is a Russian long-distance runner, who specialises in the marathon.

== Biography ==
Alevtina placed first in the women's division in the Eurocity Frankfurt Marathon in October 2005. She finished sixth in the 2006 Boston Marathon and was the youngest person in the elite field. She also finished sixth in the 2006 European Athletics Championships that year in Gothenburg.

Alevtina finished second in the 2008 Boston Marathon with a time of 2:25:27, and second in the 2008 Chicago Marathon with a time of 2:29:32. She finished ninth in the 2009 World Championships in Athletics. She won the Tokyo Marathon at the start of the 2010 season.

== Achievements ==
Year	Competition	Venue	Position	Event	Notes
Representing Russia
2005	Frankfurt Marathon	Frankfurt, Germany	1st	Marathon	2:25:12
2006	European Championships	Gothenburg, Sweden	6th	Marathon	2:31:23
2007	Honolulu Marathon	Honolulu, Hawaii	1st	Marathon	2:33:07
2009	World Championships	Berlin, Germany	9th	Marathon	2:27:39
2010	Tokyo Marathon	Tokyo, Japan	1st	Marathon	2:34:39
