= Tatyana Aryasova =

Russian long-distance runner (born 1979)

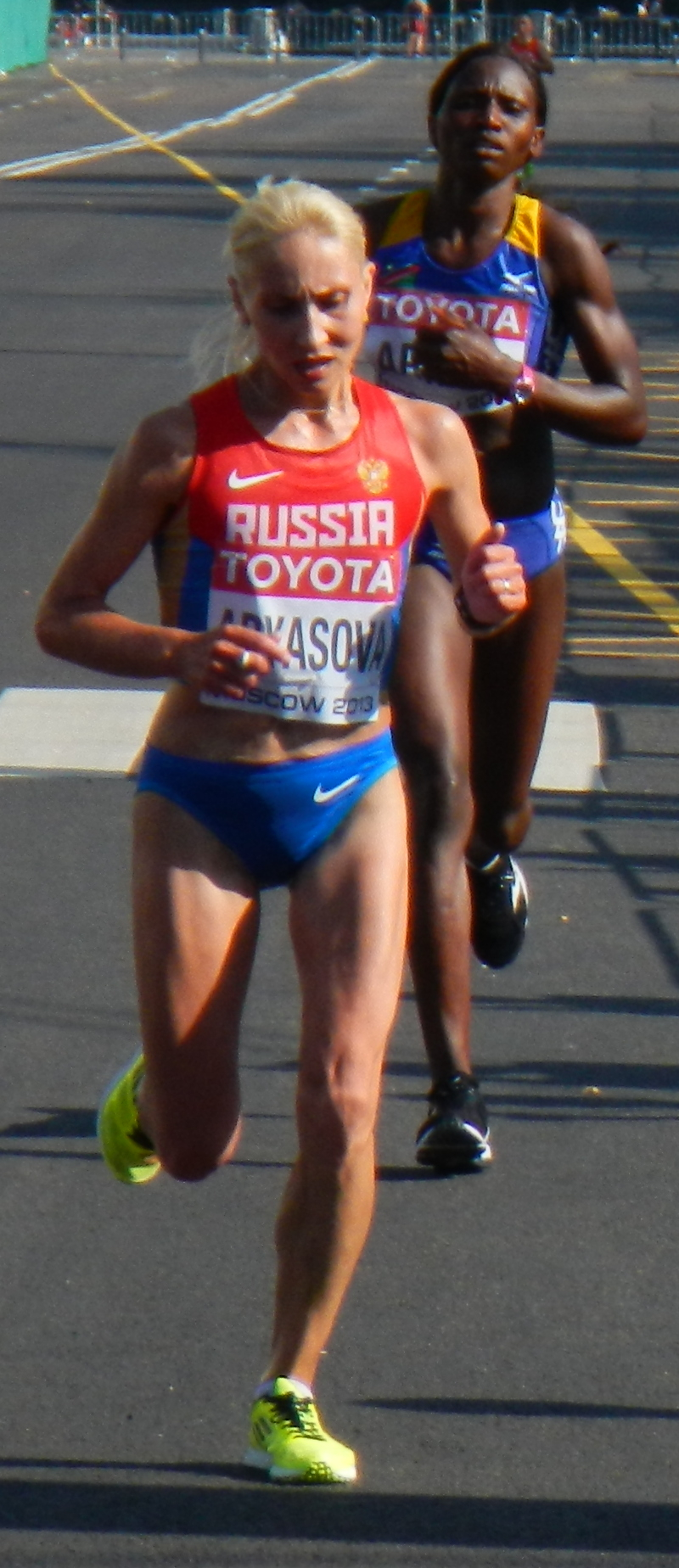
Tatyana Aryasova and Alina Armas during 2013 World Championships in Athletics – Women's Marathon in Moscow.

Tatyana Aryasova (née Khmeleva; born 2 April 1979 in Baldayevo) is a Russian long-distance runner who competes in the marathon.

She won the silver medal in 5000 metres at the 2001 Summer Universiade and won the bronze medal over the distance at the 2001 European Athletics U23 Championships. She did not compete from 2004 to 2007. On her return to international athletics, she won at the Los Angeles Marathon in what was her debut over the distance with a time of 2:29:09 hours. That year she finished nineteenth in the 10,000 metres at the 2008 Olympic Games. She also came 43rd at the 2008 IAAF World Half Marathon Championships that season.

She took part in the 2010 Bogota Half Marathon and finished in third place behind Shewarge Amare and Dire Tune. She ran a personal best and course record at the Dublin Marathon in October, finishing the course in a time of 2:26.13. Aryasova won her third marathon in February 2011, taking the prestigious women's title at the Tokyo Marathon.

In January, 2012 Aryasova was stripped of her Tokyo Marathon win and given a two-year ban by the IAAF for testing positive for the masking agent hydroxyethyl starch (HES) in tests given at the Tokyo Marathon. Runner-up Noriko Higuchi replaced Aryasova as the official winner of the 2011 Tokyo Marathon.

== Personal bests ==
- 3000 metres - 8:52.95 min (2001)
- 5000 metres - 15:15.40 min (2003)
- 10,000 metres - 31:04.88 min (2008)
- Half marathon - 1:10:20 hrs (2003)
- Marathon - 2:26:13 hrs (2010)
