= Salim Kipsang =

Kenyan long-distance runner

Salim Kipsang (born 22 December 1979) is a Kenyan long-distance runner, who specializes in the 10,000 metres and marathon.

== Life ==
Kipsang was born in 1979. Both he and his brother are runners. His brother Henry is married to the road runner Diana Sigei Chepkemoi.

Kipsang won a silver medal over 10,000 m at the 1998 World Junior Championships in Annecy. Moving on to cross country running, he claimed victory at the 2000 edition of the Cross de Soria in Spain. He competed in 10,000 m at the 2003 World Championships in Paris without finishing the race.

Among his first successes on the road was a win at the Grand Prix von Bern 10-miler in 2002. He won the Paris Marathon in 2005 with a time of 2:08:04. Kipsang was the 2006 winner of the 20 van Alphen race. He finished third at the 2007 Berlin Marathon, setting a personal best of 2:07:29 hours, and won the 2009 Tokyo Marathon. He returned to Tokyo in both 2010 and 2011 but managed only ninth and eighth place, respectively. He returned to the marathon podium in Japan at the inaugural edition of the Osaka Marathon in October 2011, placing third in a time of 2:14:18 hours.

== Achievements ==
- All results regarding marathon, unless stated otherwise

Year	Competition	Venue	Position	Event	Notes
Representing Kenya
1998	World Junior Championships	Annecy, France	2nd	10,000 m	29:36.80
2004	Rotterdam Marathon	Rotterdam, Netherlands	17th	Marathon	2:14:55
2004	Amsterdam Marathon	Amsterdam, Netherlands	7th	Marathon	2:12:44
2005	Paris Marathon	Paris, France	1st	Marathon	2:08:04
2006	Rotterdam Marathon	Rotterdam, Netherlands	6th	Marathon	2:09:26
2007	Berlin Marathon	Berlin, Germany	3rd	Marathon	2:07:29
2009	Tokyo Marathon	Tokyo, Japan	1st	Marathon	2:10:27
2010	Tokyo Marathon	Tokyo, Japan	9th	Marathon	2:11:25
2011	Tokyo Marathon	Tokyo, Japan	8th	Marathon	2:11:25
2011	Osaka Marathon	Osaka, Japan	3rd	Marathon	2:14:18
