= Arata Fujiwara =

Japanese long-distance runner

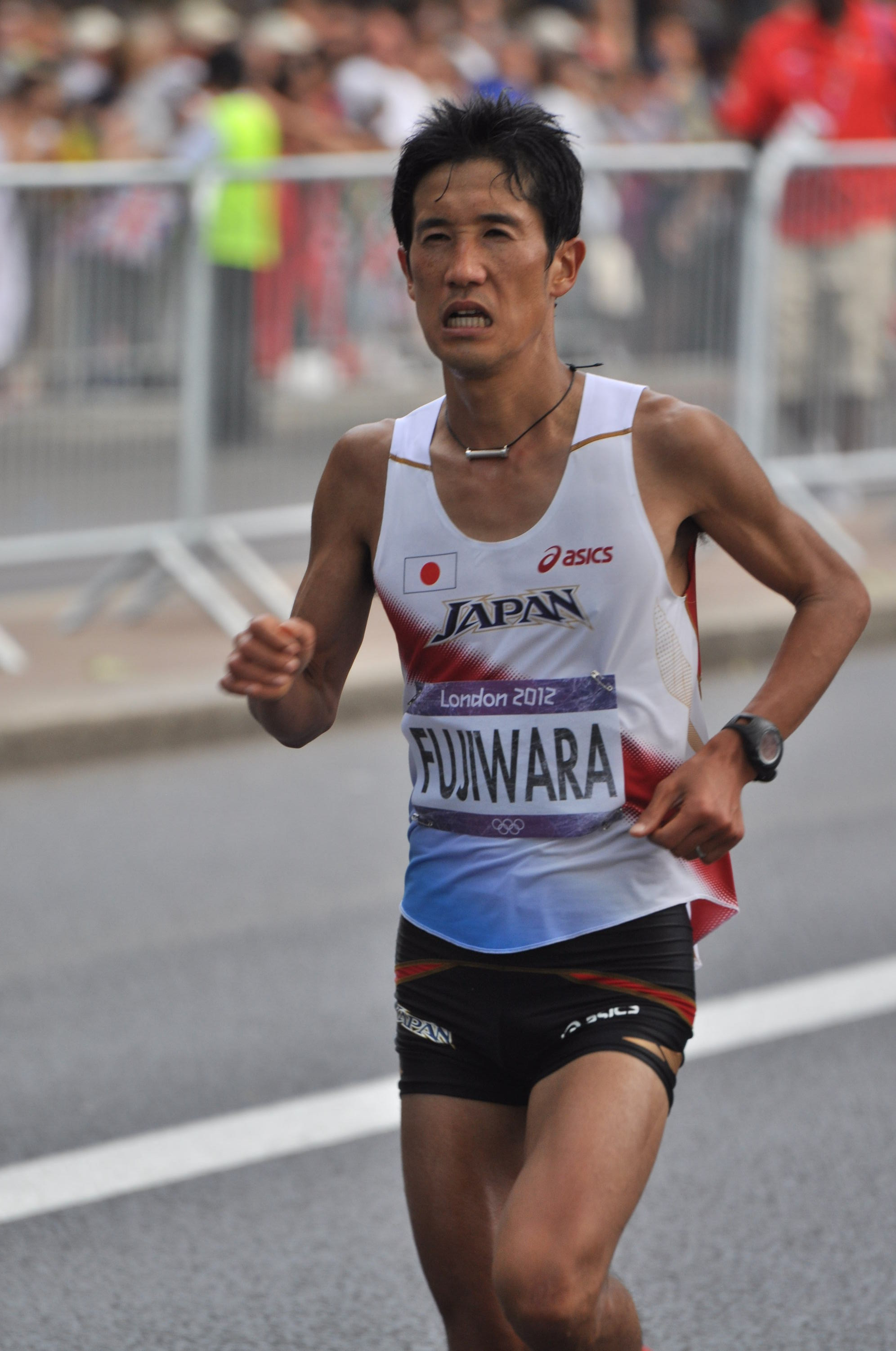

Personal information
- Born: 12 September 1981 (age 45)
- Height: 1.67 m (5 ft 5 1/2 in)
- Weight: 54 kg (119 lb)

Sport
- Country: Japan
- Sport: Athletics
- Event: Marathon

Arata Fujiwara (藤原 新, Fujiwara Arata; born 12 September 1981) is a Japanese marathon runner.

At the 2009 World Championships in Athletics held in Berlin, Germany, Fujiwara finished 61st in the men's marathon in a time of two hours, thirty-one minutes and ten seconds.

He represented Japan at the 2012 Summer Olympics in the men's marathon, finishing in 45th place. He qualified for the Games by finishing second in the 2012 Tokyo Marathon.

== Personal Bests ==
- 5000 metres – 13:49.70 (2007)
- 10,000 metres – 28:57.28 (2007)
- 20K run – 58:25 (2012)
- Half marathon – 1:01:34 (2012)
- Marathon – 2:07:48 (2012)
