= Tokyo Marathon =

Marathon held in Tokyo, Japan

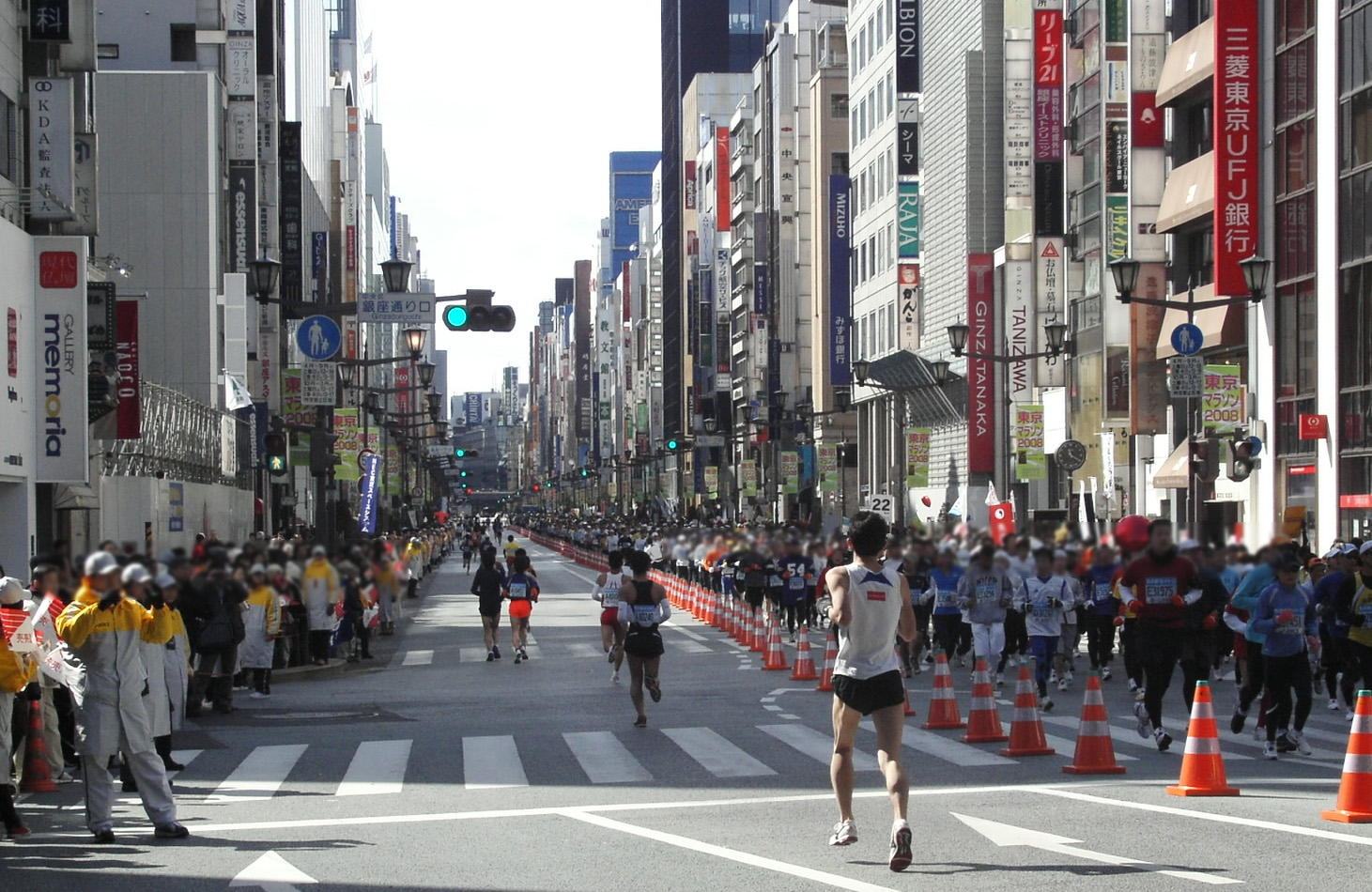
- The 2008 Tokyo Marathon
- Date: February
- Location: Tokyo, Japan
- Event type: Road
- Distance: Marathon
- Established: 2007 (19 years ago)
- Course records: Men: 2:02:16 (Benson Kipruto, 2024) Women: 2:14:29 ( Brigid Kosgei , 2026) Wheelchair men: 1:20:57 (Marcel Hug, 2023) Wheelchair women: 1:36:43 (Manuela Schär, 2023)
- Participants: 165 finishers (elite only) (2020); 35,460 finishers (2019)
- 2026 Tokyo Marathon

The Tokyo Marathon (東京マラソン, Tōkyō Marason) is an annual marathon sporting event in Tokyo, Japan. It is a World Athletics Platinum Label marathon and one of the eight World Marathon Majors. The latest edition of the race took place on 1 March 2026. It is sponsored by Tokyo Metro.

== History ==
The first Tokyo Marathon was held on 18 February 2007. However, years prior to 2007, Tokyo Marathon consisted of two marathons: the Tokyo International Marathon which took place on even years, and Tokyo-New York Friendship International Marathon which took place on odd years. In the inaugural year, 1981, both marathons took place. However, because it was not possible to support two marathons a month apart in the same city, from 1982, the alternating format went into effect.

The 2007 marathon was also a representative selection race of the 2007 World Championships in Athletics in Osaka. The total number of participants was set at 30,000. Of that, 25,000 people signed up for the marathon, and 5,000 signed up for the 10K run.

Masakazu Fujiwara became the race's first Japanese male winner at the fourth edition.

In February 2014, Dickson Chumba won in a record time of 2:05:42. This was only the second time a runner ran below 2h06 in Japan, after Tsegaye Kebede in Fukuoka Marathon (December 6, 2009). His runner-up, Tadese Tola did also run below 2:06, in a time of 2:05:57.

In January 2020, rock musician Hyde released the song "Believing in Myself" as a single inspired by the event. Due to the COVID-19 epidemic, only elite runners were invited to the 2020 Tokyo Marathon. All other participants were given a deferral to 2021. The prior year's men's winner, Ethiopian Birhanu Legese, successfully defended his title by winning with a time of 2:04:15. In the women's marathon Israeli Lonah Chemtai Salpeter set a new course record, breaking the old one by over two minutes, by winning with a time of 2:17:45; the sixth-fastest women's marathon in the world of all time.

The 2021 Tokyo Marathon was postponed to 17 October 2021 due to the pandemic. It was then postponed again to 6 March 2022; the event was still referred to as the 2021 Tokyo Marathon, and there was no 2022 Tokyo Marathon. Additionally, all overseas runners were barred from competing, with their entries automatically transferred to 2023.

== Course ==
External images
- Course map of full marathon in 2012
- Course map of full marathon in 2017

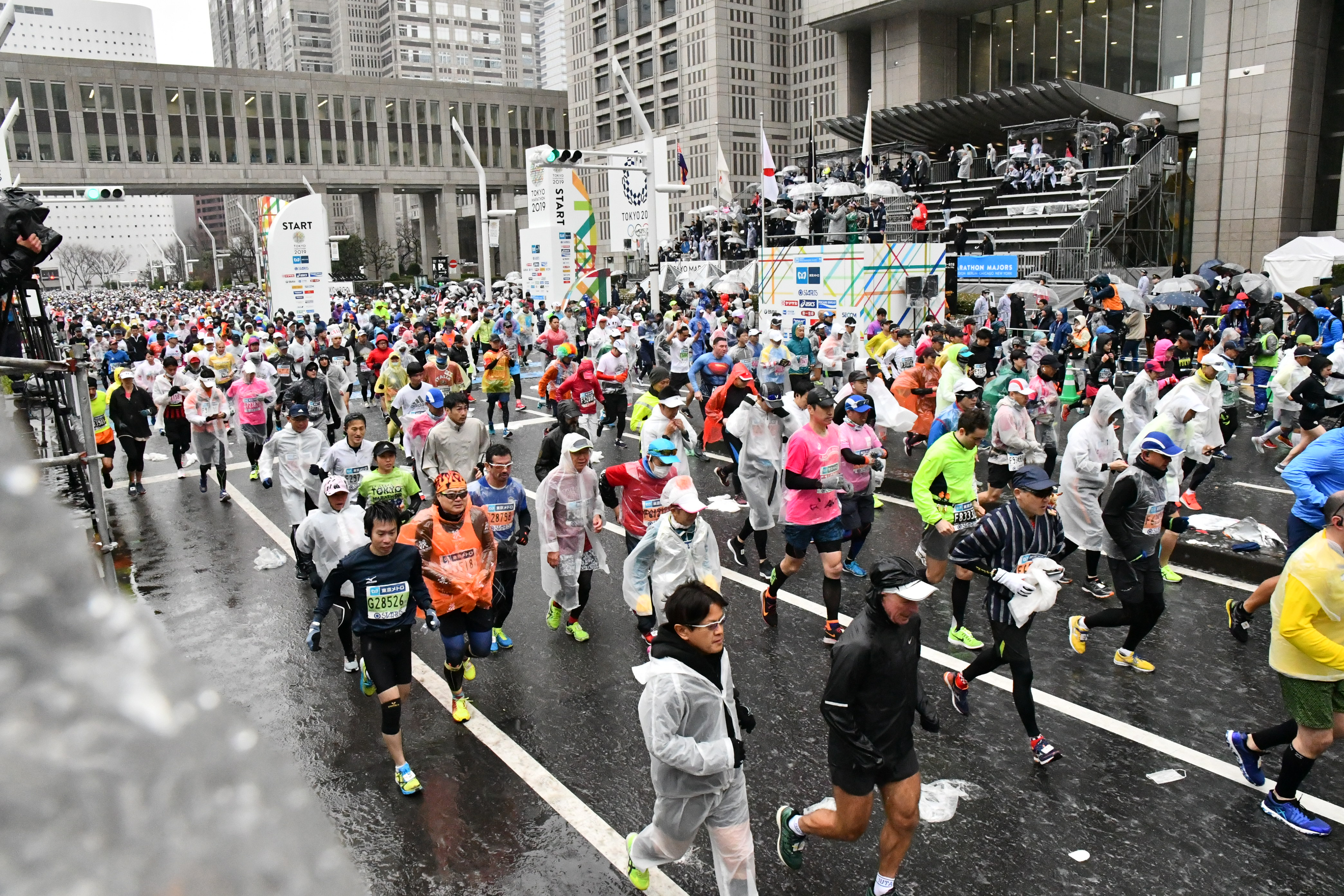
Start line at Shinjuku in 2019

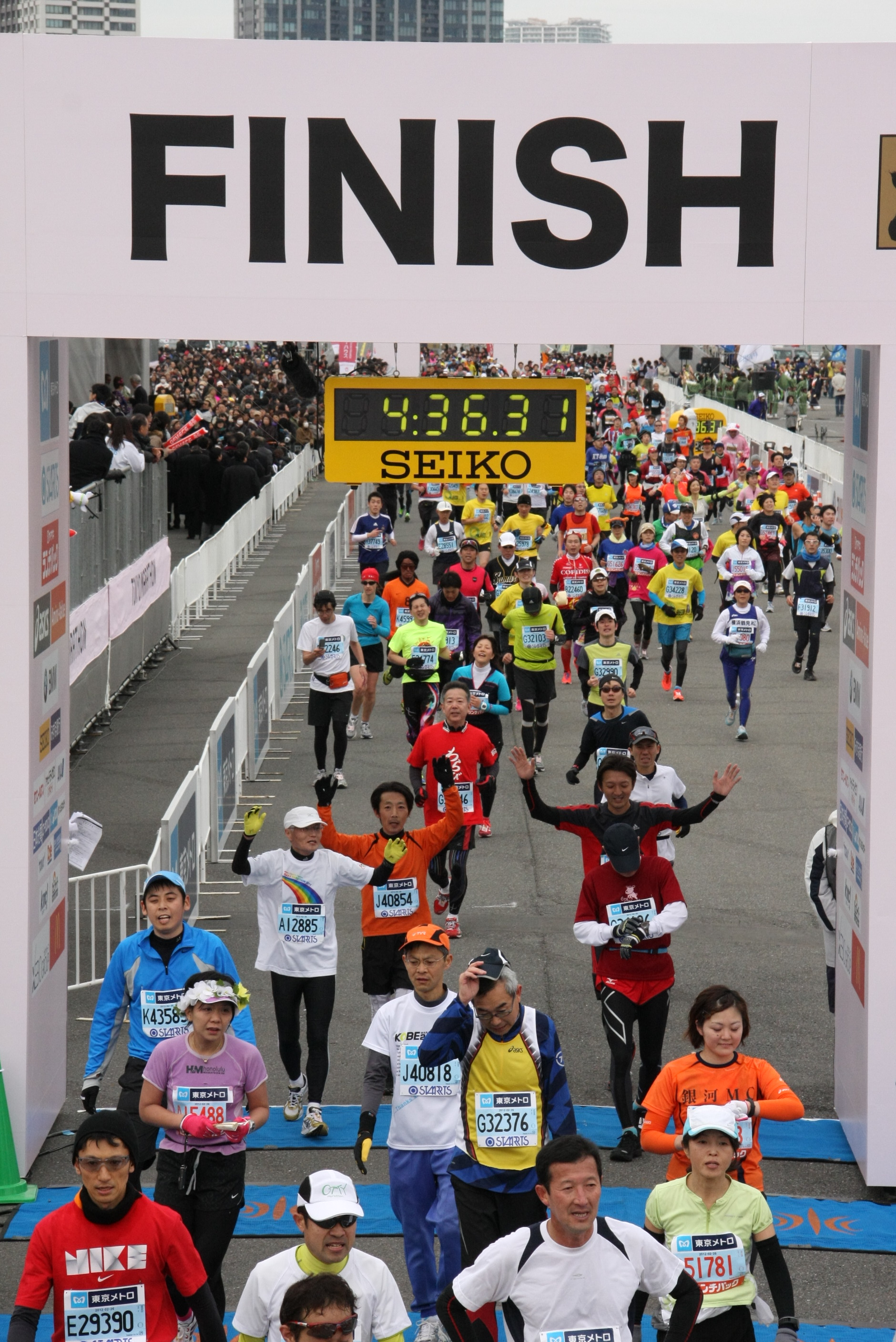
Full marathon finish line in 2012

=== 2007–2016 ===
Tokyo Metropolitan Government Building -> Tokyo Imperial Palace -> Hibiya Park (10 km Finish) -> Shinagawa -> Ginza -> Nihonbashi -> Asakusa -> Tsukiji -> Tokyo Big Sight (Full Marathon Finish)

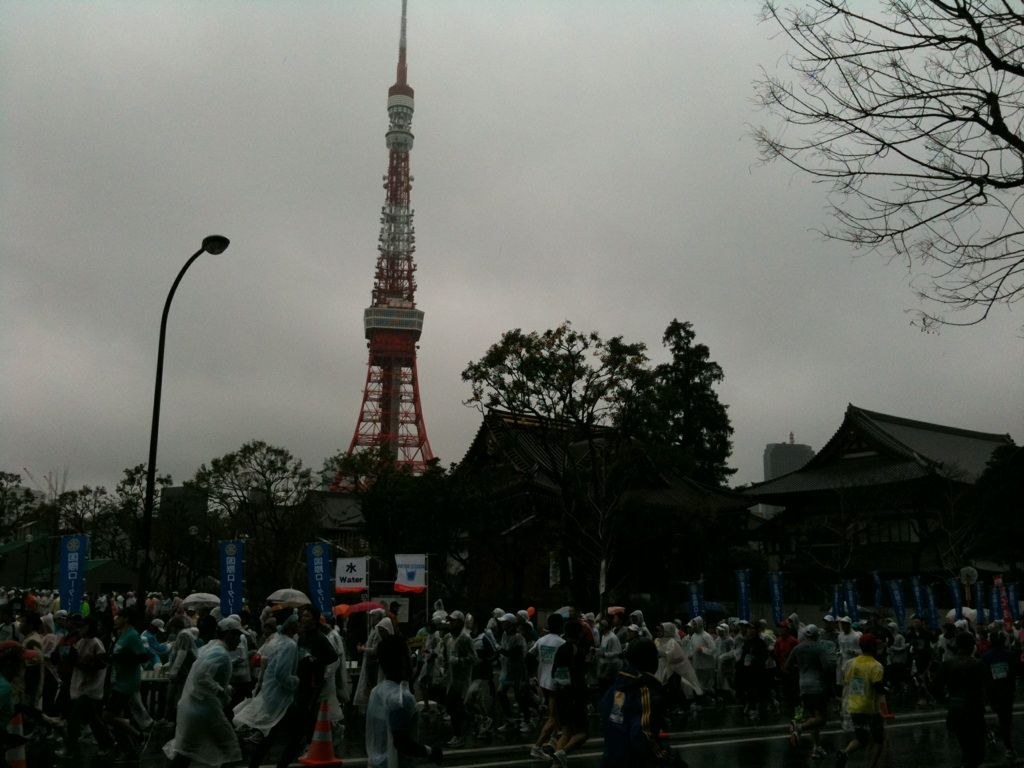
Passing Tokyo Tower and Zōjō-ji in 2010

=== 2017– ===
Tokyo Metropolitan Government Building -> Iidabashi -> Nihonbashi (10 km Finish) -> Asakusa -> Koto (Halfway Point) -> Nihonbashi -> Ginza -> Shinagawa -> Hibiya Park -> Tokyo Station (Full Marathon Finish)

== Registration ==
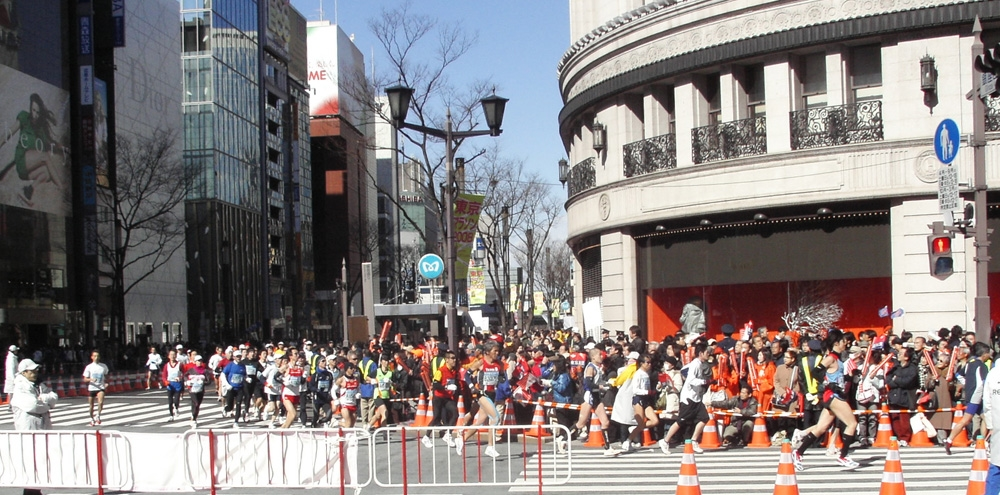
Passing Ginza's Wako store in 2008

=== Numbers ===
When registrations closed for the 2015 Tokyo marathon 308,810 people had applied for the full marathon, and 1,014 had applied for the 10 km race. This gave a total number of 309,824 applicants and an oversubscription rate of 11.3 for the marathon.

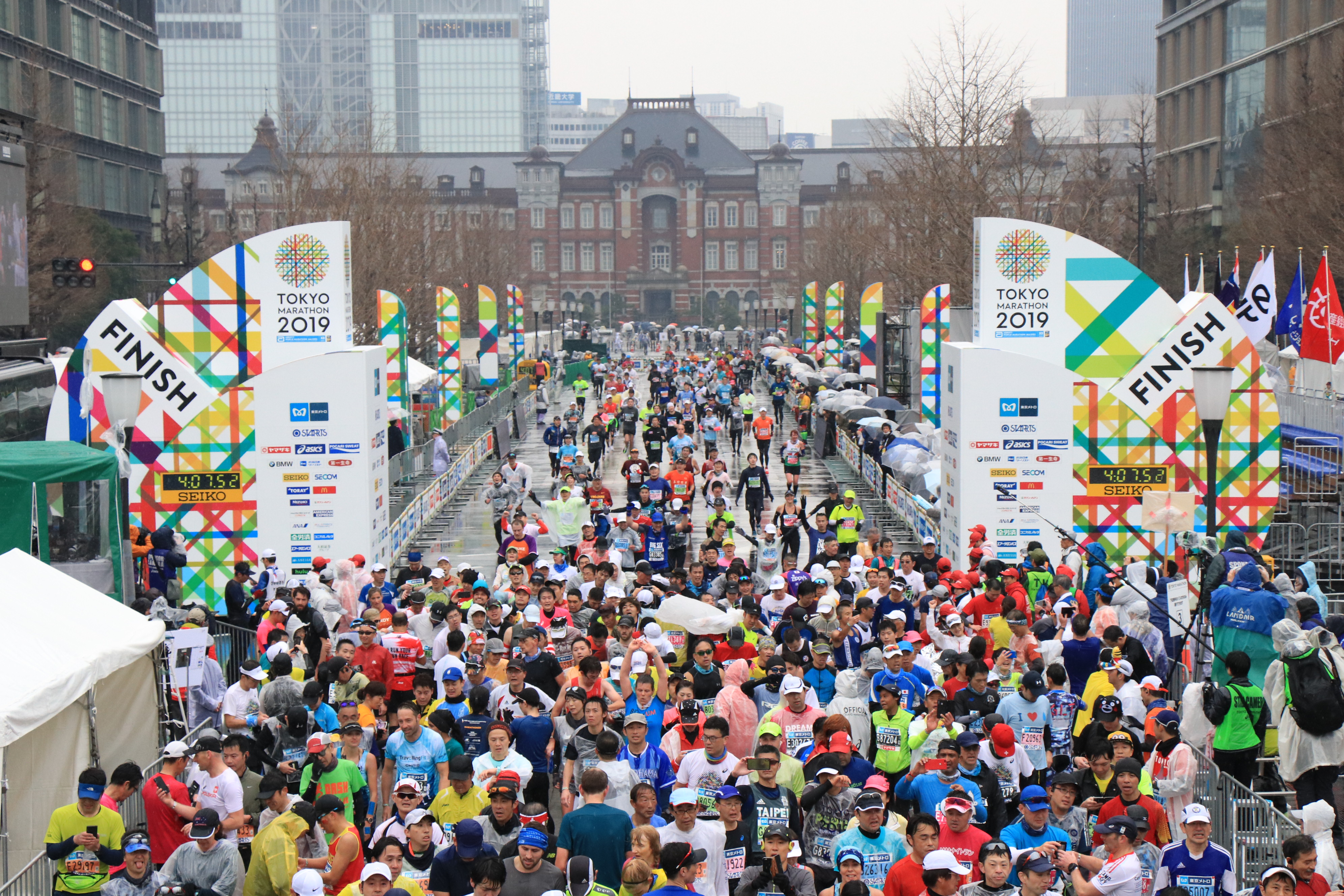
Full marathon finish line in 2019

For the 2019 event, there were 331,211 applicants. 330,271 of the applications were for the full marathon and 940 were for the 10 km race.

=== Elite field ===
Apart from the invited athletes, runners registered with JAAF who satisfy the following requirement can register in the Elite field.

In 2014, the requirements were:

Distance	Men	Women
Full	2:23:00	2:54:00
Half	1:01:30	1:11:00
10 km	28:10	32:10

=== Demographics ===
The field of runners at the Tokyo Marathon differs in significant ways from the other World Marathon Majors. There are far more men than women. The Tokyo Marathon also has the oldest field of runners of the seven races. In 2024, close to 50% of the finishers were 50 years or older.

== See also ==
- Tokyo International Marathon
- Tokyo International Women's Marathon
