= Morocco at the 2025 World Athletics Championships =

- Flag of Morocco
- WA code: MAR

in Tokyo, Japan 13 September 2025 – 21 September 2025
- Competitors: 19 (13 men and 6 women)
- Medals Ranked 27th: Gold 0 Silver 1 Bronze 0 Total 1

World Athletics Championships appearances
- 1983; 1987; 1991; 1993; 1995; 1997; 1999; 2001; 2003; 2005; 2007; 2009; 2011; 2013; 2015; 2017; 2019; 2022; 2023; 2025

Morocco competed at the 2025 World Athletics Championships in Tokyo, Japan, from 13 to 21 September 2025.

== Medallists ==
Medal	Athlete	Event	Date
Silver	Soufiane El Bakkali	Men's 3000 metres steeplechase	September 15

== Results ==
Morocco entered 19 athletes to the championships: 6 women and 13 men.

Key

- Q = Qualified for the next round
- q = Qualified for the next round as a fastest loser or, in field events, by position without achieving the qualifying target
- NR = National record
- PB = Personal best
- SB = Season best
- N/A = Round not applicable for the event

=== Men ===
Track and road events

Athlete	Event	Heat		Semifinal		Final	
Athlete	Event	Result	Rank	Result	Rank	Result	Rank
Abderrahman El Assal	800 metres	1:46.12	7	Did not advance			
Abdelati El Guesse	800 metres	1:46.80	8	Did not advance			
Moad Zahafi	800 metres	1:47.14	5	Did not advance			
Anass Essayi	1500 metres	3:37.70	7	Did not advance			
Fouad Messaoudi	1500 metres	3:37.83	10	Did not advance			
Hafid Rizqy	1500 metres	3:41.55	7	Did not advance			
Soufiane El Bakkali	5000 metres	DNS		—N/a		Did not advance	
Soufiyan Bouqantar	Marathon	—N/a				DNF	
Mohamed Reda El Aaraby	Marathon	—N/a				2:13:29	20
Othmane El Goumri	Marathon	—N/a				DNF	
Salaheddine Ben Yazide	3000 metres steeplechase	8:27.21	1 Q	—N/a		8:35.16	5
Soufiane El Bakkali	3000 metres steeplechase	8:26.99	1 Q	—N/a		8:33.95	2nd place, silver medalist(s)
Faid El Mostafa	3000 metres steeplechase	8:44.10	11	—N/a		Did not advance	
Mohamed Tindouft	3000 metres steeplechase	8:35.73	9	—N/a		Did not advance	

=== Women ===
Track and road events

Athlete	Event	Heat		Semifinal		Final	
Athlete	Event	Result	Rank	Result	Rank	Result	Rank
Soukaina Haji	800 metres	2:06.80	8	Did not advance			
Assia Raziki	800 metres	1:59.82	2 Q	1:57.87 PB	7	Did not advance	
Bahiya El Arfaoui	1500 metres	4:17.17	13	Did not advance			
Kaoutar Farkoussi	Marathon	—N/a				DNF	
Fatima Ezzahra Gardadi	Marathon	—N/a				DNF	
Rahma Tahiri	Marathon	—N/a				2:51:30	54
