= 2011 World Marathon Cup =

World Marathon Cup in Daegu

The 2011 World Marathon Cup was the 14th edition of the World Marathon Cup of athletics and were held in Daegu, South Korea, inside of the 2011 World Championships.

== Results ==
Team men
#	Nations	Time
1	Kenya	6:29:23
2	Japan	6:41:13
3	Morocco	6:42:18

Team women
#	Nations	Time
1	Kenya	7:26:57
2	China	7:31:34
3	Ethiopia	7:32:20

Individual men
Rank	Athlete	Nationality	Time	Notes
1st place, gold medalist(s)	Abel Kirui	Kenya	2:07:38	SB
2nd place, silver medalist(s)	Vincent Kipruto	Kenya	2:10:06	
3rd place, bronze medalist(s)	Feyisa Lilesa	Ethiopia	2:10:32	SB
4	Abderrahime Bouramdane	Morocco	2:10:55	
5	David Barmasai Tumo	Kenya	2:11:39	
6	Eliud Kiptanui	Kenya	2:11:50	
7	Hiroyuki Horibata	Japan	2:11:52	
8	Ruggero Pertile	Italy	2:11:57	
9	Stephen Kiprotich	Uganda	2:12:57	
10	Kentaro Nakamoto	Japan	2:13:10	

Individual women
Rank	Athlete	Nationality	Time	Notes
1st place, gold medalist(s)	Edna Kiplagat	Kenya	2:28:43	
2nd place, silver medalist(s)	Priscah Jeptoo	Kenya	2:29:00	
3rd place, bronze medalist(s)	Sharon Cherop	Kenya	2:29:14	SB
4	Bezunesh Bekele	Ethiopia	2:29:21	
5	Yukiko Akaba	Japan	2:29:35	
6	Zhou Chunxiu	China	2:29:58	
7	Isabellah Andersson	Sweden	2:30:13	
8	Wang Jiali	China	2:30:25	
9	Marisa Barros	Portugal	2:30:29	
10	Remi Nakazato	Japan	2:30:52	

== See also ==
- 2011 World Championships in Athletics – Men's Marathon
- 2011 World Championships in Athletics – Women's Marathon
