= Morocco at the 2009 World Championships in Athletics =

- WA code: MAR
- National federation: Fédération Royale Marocaine d’Athlétisme
- Website: www.moroccanathletics.com

in Berlin
- Competitors: 21
- Medals: Gold 0 Silver 0 Bronze 0 Total 0

World Championships in Athletics appearances
- 1983; 1987; 1991; 1993; 1995; 1997; 1999; 2001; 2003; 2005; 2007; 2009; 2011; 2013; 2015; 2017; 2019; 2022; 2023; 2025

Morocco competed at the 2009 World Championships in Athletics from 15–23 August. A team of 21 athletes was announced in preparation for the competition. Selected athletes have achieved one of the competition's qualifying standards. The squad includes two-time marathon champion Jaouad Gharib, and twice 800 metres silver medallist Hasna Benhassi.

== Team selection ==
Track and road events

Event	Athletes	
Event	Men	Women
100 metres	Aziz El Ouahabi	
200 metres	Khalid Idrissi Zougari	
800 metres	Amine Laalou	Hasna Benhassi; Halima Hachlaf
1500 metres	Abdalaati Iguider; Mohamed Moustaoui; Amine Laalou	Siham Hilali; Btissam Lakhouad
5000 metres	Chaker Boujettaoui; Anas Selmouni	Mariem Alaoui Selsouli
Marathon	Jaouad Gharib; Abderrahim Goumri; Rachid Kisri; Ahmed Badday; Mohamed Nani	
3000 m steeplechase	Abdelatif Chemlal; Jamal Chatbi	Hanane Ouhaddou

Field and combined events

Event	Athletes	
Event	Men	Women
Long jump	Yahya Berrabah	

== Results ==
=== Men ===
Track and road events

Event	Athletes	Heat Round 1		Heat Round 2		Semifinal		Final	
Event	Athletes	Result	Rank	Result	Rank	Result	Rank	Result	Rank
100 m	Aziz El Ouahabi	10.40	36	did not advance					
200 m	Khalid Idrissi Zougari								
800 m	Amine Laalou								
1500 m	Abdalaati Iguider	3:42.88	22 Q						
1500 m	Mohamed Moustaoui	3:37.34	4 Q						
1500 m	Amine Laalou	3:44.75	33 Q						
5000 m	Chaker Boujettaoui								
5000 m	Anas Selmouni								
3000 m steeplechase	Abdelatif Chemlal	8:25.68	18	did not advance					
3000 m steeplechase	Jamal Chatbi	8:20.26	11 Q						
Marathon	Jaouad Gharib								
Marathon	Abderrahim Goumri								
Marathon	Rachid Kisri								
Marathon	Ahmed Badday								
Marathon	Mohamed Nani								

Field events

Event	Athletes	Qualification		Final	
Event	Athletes	Result	Rank	Result	Rank
Long jump	Yahya Berrabah				

=== Women ===
Event	Athletes	Heat Round 1		Heat Round 2		Semifinal		Final	
Event	Athletes	Result	Rank	Result	Rank	Result	Rank	Result	Rank
800 m	Hasna Benhassi	2:02.83	11 Q						
800 m	Halima Hachlaf	2:02.46	5 Q						
1500 m	Siham Hilali								
1500 m	Btissam Lakhouad								
5000 m	Mariem Alaoui Selsouli								
3000 m steeplechase	Hanane Ouhaddou	9:35.78	20	did not advance					
