= Horibata =

Horibata (Japanese: 堀端) is a Japanese surname. Notable people with the surname include:

- Hiroyuki Horibata (born 1986), Japanese long-distance runner
- Hori Horibata (born 1993), Filipino politician
