= Morocco at the 2015 World Championships in Athletics =

- WA code: MAR
- National federation: Fédération Royale Marocaine d'Athlétisme
- Website: www.frma.ma

in Beijing
- Competitors: 22
- Medals Ranked 32nd: Gold 0 Silver 0 Bronze 1 Total 1

World Championships in Athletics appearances
- 1983; 1987; 1991; 1993; 1995; 1997; 1999; 2001; 2003; 2005; 2007; 2009; 2011; 2013; 2015; 2017; 2019; 2022; 2023; 2025

Morocco competed at the 2015 World Championships in Athletics in Beijing, China, from 22–30 August 2015.

== Medalists ==
The following Moroccan competitors won medals at the Championships

Medal	Athlete	Event	Date
Bronze	Abdalaati Iguider	1500 metres	30 August

== Results ==
(q – qualified, NM – no mark, SB – season best)

=== Men ===
Track and road events

Athlete	Event	Heat		Semifinal		Final	
Athlete	Event	Result	Rank	Result	Rank	Result	Rank
Aziz Ouhadi	100 metres	10.22	6	Did not advance			
Nader Belhanbel	800 metres	1:46.23	2 Q	1:45.28	3 q	1:47.09	7
Amine El Manaoui	800 metres	1:45.86	2 Q	1:46.09	5	Did not advance	
Abdelati El Guesse	800 metres	1:47.49	5	Did not advance			
Abdalaati Iguider	1500 metres	3:38.14	2 Q	3:35.20	3 Q	3:34.67	3rd place, bronze medalist(s)
Fouad Elkaam	1500 metres	3:40.12	8	Did not advance			
Yassine Bensghir	1500 metres	3:43.22	5 Q	3:44.95	9	Did not advance	
Othmane El Goumri	5000 metres	13:58.06	13	—N/a		Did not advance	
Younes Essalhi	5000 metres	DNF		—N/a		Did not advance	
Rachid Kisri	Marathon	—N/a				DNF	
Adil Annani	Marathon	—N/a				DNF	
Hamid Ezzine	3000 metres steeplechase	8:29.26	5 q	—N/a		8:25.72	11
Brahim Taleb	3000 metres steeplechase	8:24.84	2 Q	—N/a		8:17.73	7
Hicham Sigueni	3000 metres steeplechase	8:49.73	7	—N/a		Did not advance	

=== Women ===
Track and road events

Athlete	Event	Heat		Semifinal		Final	
Athlete	Event	Result	Rank	Result	Rank	Result	Rank
Malika Akkaoui	800 metres	2:00.37 SB	3 Q	1:59.03 SB	6	Did not advance	
Malika Akkaoui	1500 metres	4:05.85	8 q	4:16.61	4 Q	4:16.98	12
Rababe Arafi	800 metres	2:00.37 PB	1 Q	1:58.55 PB	1 Q	1:58.90	4
Rababe Arafi	1500 metres	4:04.17	3 Q	4:08.19	4 Q	4:13.66	9
Siham Hilali	1500 metres	DNF		Did not advance			
Soumiya Labani	Marathon	—N/a				DNF	
Hayat Lambarki	400 metres hurdles	58.05	7	Did not advance			
Salima El Ouali Alami	3000 metres steeplechase	9:28.18	5 q	—N/a		9:32.15	10
Hanane Ouhaddou	3000 metres steeplechase	DQ		—N/a		Did not advance	
Fadwa Sidi Madane	3000 metres steeplechase	9:27.87 PB	4 q	—N/a		9:41.45	14

== Sources ==
- Moroccan team
