= 2011 World Championships in Athletics – Men's marathon =

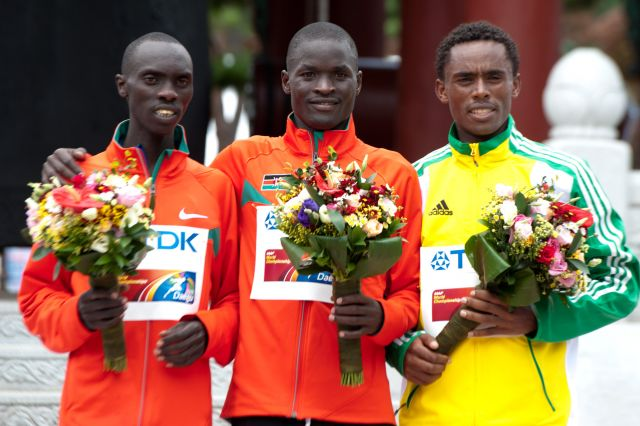
The men's marathon podium at the 2011 World Championships

Official Video

The Men's marathon at the 2011 World Championships in Athletics was held starting and finishing at Gukchae-bosang Memorial Park on September 4. Abel Kirui was the defending champion.

The story was all Kirui. Running a casual pace to 15 km, first the Moroccan contingent tried to test the field. The pace picked up and the field strung out. After 25 km, it was down to Kirui, Vincent Kipruto, Eliud Kiptanui, Feyisa Lilesa and Abderrahime Bouramdane. Then Kirui put the hammer down, running 14:18 between 25 and 30 km. Nobody could go with him and he ran all alone, extending his lead for the remainder of the race to finish in 2:07:38. The 2:28 gap was the largest winning margin for the men's marathon in World Championship history, and as of 2024 it remains the only time the men's marathon has been won by more than two minutes. After dropping Bouramdane and Kiptanui, Kipruto and Lilesa ran tactically for the remainder of the race, with Kipruto getting silver.

The race was also the World Cup team competition. In that competition, the scoring is based on the cumulative time of the top three finishers for each team. Each country participating in the World Cup was allowed 5 entries into the marathon. The event was clearly won by Kenya, with 1st, 2nd and 5th-place finishers (Kenya also had the 6th-place finisher). Perennial champion Japan finished second, a cumulative minute ahead of Morocco.

== Medalists ==
Gold	Silver	Bronze
Abel Kirui; Kenya	Vincent Kipruto; Kenya	Feyisa Lilesa; Ethiopia

=== World Marathon Cup ===
Gold	Silver	Bronze
Kenya; Abel Kirui; Vincent Kipruto; David Barmasai Tumo	Japan; Hiroyuki Horibata; Kentaro Nakamoto; Yuki Kawauchi	Morocco; Abderrahime Bouramdane; Rachid Kisri; Ahmed Baday

- Note: Marathon Cup medals are not listed in the championships medal table

== Records ==
Prior to the competition, the records were as follows:

World record	Haile Gebrselassie (ETH)	2:03:59	Berlin, Germany	28 September 2008
Championship record	Abel Kirui (KEN)	2:06:54	Berlin, Germany	22 August 2009
World Leading	Emmanuel Kipchirchir Mutai (KEN)	2:03:40	London, Great Britain	17 April 2011
African record	Haile Gebrselassie (ETH)	2:03:59	Berlin, Germany	28 September 2008
Asian record	Toshinari Takaoka (JPN)	2:06:16	Chicago, United States	13 October 2002
North, Central American and Caribbean record	Khalid Khannouchi (USA)	2:05:38	London, Great Britain	24 April 2002
South American record	Ronaldo da Costa (BRA)	2:06:05	Berlin, Germany	20 September 1998
European record	António Pinto (POR)	2:06:36	London, Great Britain	16 April 2000
European record	Benoît Zwierzchiewski (FRA)	2:06:36	Paris, France	6 April 2003
Oceanian record	Robert de Castella (AUS)	2:07:51	Boston, United States	21 April 1986

== Qualification standards ==
A time	B time
2:17:00

== Schedule ==
Date	Time	Round
September 4, 2011	09:00	Final

== Results ==
KEY:	q	Fastest non-qualifiers	Q	Qualified	NR	National record	PB	Personal best	SB	Seasonal best

=== Final ===
Rank	Athlete	Nationality	Time	Notes
1st place, gold medalist(s)	Abel Kirui	Kenya	2:07:38	SB
2nd place, silver medalist(s)	Vincent Kipruto	Kenya	2:10:06	
3rd place, bronze medalist(s)	Feyisa Lilesa	Ethiopia	2:10:32	SB
4	Abderrahime Bouramdane	Morocco	2:10:55	
5	David Barmasai Tumo	Kenya	2:11:39	
6	Eliud Kiptanui	Kenya	2:11:50	
7	Hiroyuki Horibata	Japan	2:11:52	
8	Ruggero Pertile	Italy	2:11:57	
9	Stephen Kiprotich	Uganda	2:12:57	
10	Kentaro Nakamoto	Japan	2:13:10	
11	Rachid Kisri	Morocco	2:13:24	
12	Eshetu Wendimu	Ethiopia	2:13:37	
13	Marius Ionescu	Romania	2:15:32	PB
14	Dong Guojian	China	2:15:45	SB
15	David Webb	Great Britain & N.I.	2:15:48	SB
16	Cuthbert Nyasango	Zimbabwe	2:15:56	SB
17	Beraki Beyene	Eritrea	2:16:03	SB
18	Yuki Kawauchi	Japan	2:16:11	
19	Aleksey Sokolov	Russia	2:16:23	
20	Ser-Od Bat-Ochir	Mongolia	2:16:41	
21	Aleksey Sokolov	Russia	2:16:48	
22	Lee Merrien	Great Britain & N.I.	2:16:59	
23	Jeong Jin-hyeok	South Korea	2:17:04	
24	Li Zicheng	China	2:17:35	
25	José Manuel Martínez	Spain	2:17:44	
26	Rafael Iglesias	Spain	2:17:45	SB
27	Ahmed Baday	Morocco	2:17:59	
28	Lee Myong-seung	South Korea	2:18:05	
29	Yoshinori Oda	Japan	2:18:05	
30	Pablo Villalobos	Spain	2:18:12	
31	Mike Morgan	United States	2:18:30	SB
32	Urige Buta	Norway	2:20:16	
33	Wu Shiwei	China	2:21:12	
34	Jesper Faurschou	Denmark	2:21:15	
35	Hwang Jun-Hyeon	South Korea	2:21:54	SB
36	Mike Tebulo	Malawi	2:22:45	SB
37	Mike Sayenko	United States	2:22:49	SB
38	Yukihiro Kitaoka	Japan	2:23:11	SB
39	Jeff Eggleston	United States	2:23:33	
40	Hwang Jun-Suk	South Korea	2:23:47	
41	Nicholas Arciniaga	United States	2:24:06	
42	Anton Kosmac	Slovenia	2:24:16	
43	Samuel Goitom	Eritrea	2:25:42	SB
44	Kim Min	South Korea	2:27:20	SB
45	Sergio Reyes	United States	2:29:15	SB
46	Coolboy Ngamole	South Africa	2:30:01	
47	Bekir Karayel	Turkey	2:33:20	SB
48	Ruben Sança	Cape Verde	2:34:40	
49	Jhon Lennon Casallo	Peru	2:36:43	
50	Modike Lucky Mohale	South Africa	2:38:22	SB
51	Sangay Wangchuk	Bhutan	2:38:33	NR
	Jeff Hunt	Australia	DNF	
	Khalid Kamal Yaseen	Bahrain	DNF	
	Yared Asmerom	Eritrea	DNF	
	Yonas Kifle	Eritrea	DNF	
	Michael Tesfay	Eritrea	DNF	
	Chala Dechase	Ethiopia	DNF	
	Gebregziabher Gebremariam	Ethiopia	DNF	
	Bazu Worku	Ethiopia	DNF	
	Zohar Zemiro	Israel	DNF	
	Benjamin Kiptoo	Kenya	DNF	
	Ali Mabrouk El Zaidi	Libya	DNF	
	Adil Ennani	Morocco	DNF	
	Abderrahim Goumri	Morocco	DNF	
	David Ngakane	South Africa	DNF	
	Daniel Kipkorir Chepyegon	Uganda	DNF	
	Nicholas Kiprono	Uganda	DNF	

=== World Cup scoring ===
Rank	Country	Athlete	Time
1	Kenya		6:29:23
1		Abel Kirui	2:07:38
2		Vincent Kipruto	2:10:06
5		David Barmasai Tumo	2:11:39
6		Eliud Kiptanui	(2:11:50)
		Benjamin Kolum Kiptoo	()
2	Japan		6:41:13
7		Hiroyuki Horibata	2:11:52
10		Kentaro Nakamoto	2:13:10
18		Yuki Kawauchi	2:16:11
29		Yoshinori Oda	(2:18:05)
38		Yukihiro Kitaoka	(2:23:11)
3	Spain		6:53:41
25		José Manuel Martínez	2:17:44
26		Rafael Iglesias	2:17:45
30		Pablo Villalobos	2:18:12
4	China		6:54:32
14		Dong Guojian	2:15:45
24		Li Zicheng	2:17:35
33		Wu Shiwei	2:21:12
5	South Korea		6:57:03
23		Jeong Jin-hyeok	2:17:04
28		Lee Myong-seung	2:18:05
35		Hwang Jun-hyeon	2:21:54
40		Hwang Jun-suk	(2:23:47)
44		Kim Min	(2:27:20)
6	United States		7:04:52
31		Mike Morgan	2:18:30
37		Mike Sayenko	2:22:49
39		Jeff Eggleston	2:23:33
41		Nicholas Arciniaga	(2:24:06)
45		Sergio Reyes	(2:29:15)

== See also ==
- 2011 World Marathon Cup
