= Kentaro Nakamoto =

Japanese long-distance runner (born 1982)

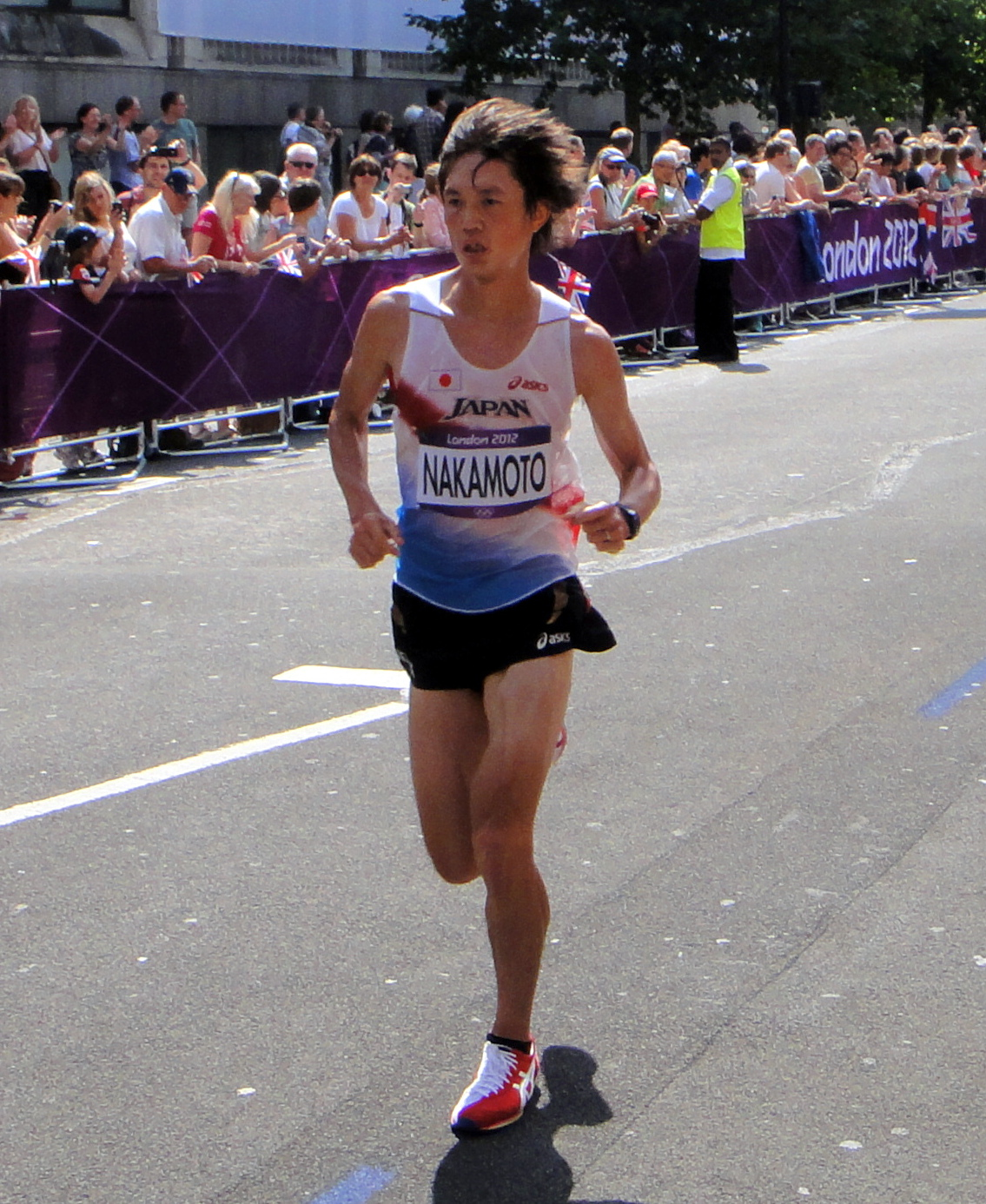
- Kentaro Nakamoto in the marathon at the 2012 Olympics in London

Personal information
- Born: December 7, 1982 (age 43) Shimonoseki, Japan
- Height: 1.73 m (5 ft 8 in)
- Weight: 58 kg (128 lb)

Sport
- Country: Japan
- Sport: Athletics
- Event: Marathon

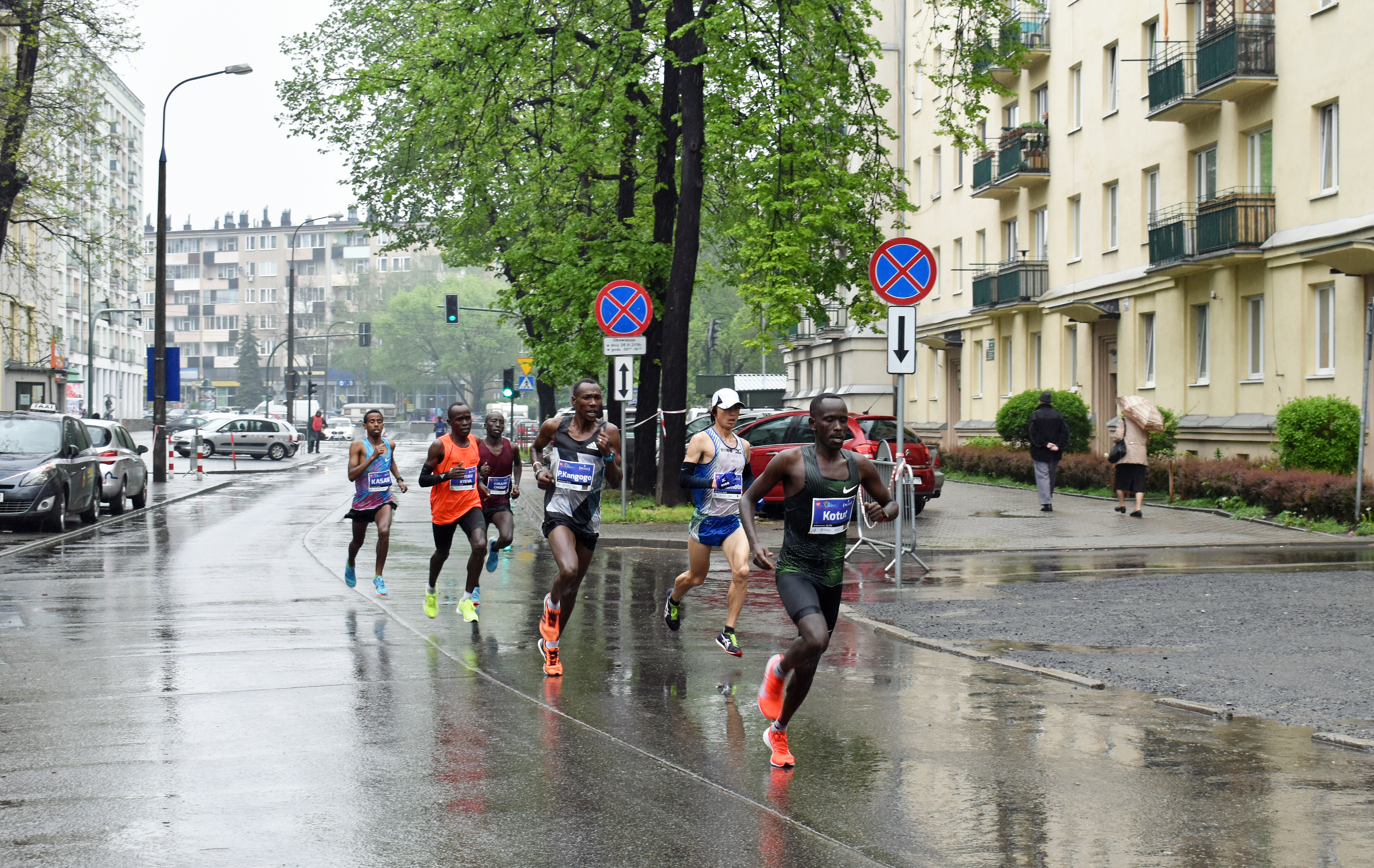
18. PZU Cracovia Marathon 2019 (Krakow, Poland).

Kentaro Nakamoto (Japanese: 中本 健太郎, Hepburn: Nakamoto Kentarō; born 7 December 1982) is a Japanese long-distance runner who competes in marathon races. He represented Japan in the marathon at the 2012 Summer Olympics and the 2011, 2013 and 2017 World Championships in Athletics, finishing in the top ten on all four occasions. His personal best for the distance is 2:08:35 hours.

== Career ==
Born in Kikugawa in Japan's Yamaguchi Prefecture (now part of Shimonoseki), he attended Yamaguchi Prefectural City West High School. He began to feature in high level races while attending Takushoku University and ran at the 2005 Hakone Ekiden. After graduation he joined the Yaskawa Electric Corporation and the athletic director there encouraged him to move towards being a marathon specialist. Nakamoto made his debut over that distance in 2008 and came third at the Nobeoka Marathon with a time of 2:13:54 hours and also took second place at that year's Hokkaido Marathon.

Nakamoto set a half marathon best of 1:02:29 hours at the Kagawa Marugame Half Marathon in 2009, He knocked one second off his marathon best with a top ten finish at the Tokyo Marathon in March. He went under that time twice in his two marathon outings in 2010, running 2:11:42 at the Beppu-Ōita Marathon and 2:12:38 at the Amsterdam Marathon.

He broke the 2:10 barrier at the 2011 Lake Biwa Marathon, having his best finish yet with a run of 2:09:31 for fourth. As one of the leading Japanese men that season, he was selected for the 2011 World Championships in Athletics in Daegu. In his first international appearance for Japan he performed well and took tenth place in the World Championship Marathon. He was Asia's second fastest performer, after his teammate Hiroyuki Horibata, with whom he secured the team silver medals in the 2011 World Marathon Cup. That year he also ran track bests of 14:04.31 minutes for the 5000 metres and 29:04.24 minutes for the 10,000 metres. A return to the Lake Biwa race in 2012 saw him finish in the same position, but in a personal best of 2:08:53 hours (the second Japanese behind Ryo Yamamoto). This performance earned Nakamoto another international selection and competing for Japan at the 2012 London Olympics he ranked as Asia's best performer in the Men's Olympic marathon, taking sixth place with a run of 2:11:16 hours.

Nakamoto began 2013 with a personal best of 2:08:35 hours at the Beppu-Ōita Marathon, taking the runner-up spot behind Yuki Kawauchi, who broke the course record to win.
