= Lagos City Marathon =

Marathon event in Lagos

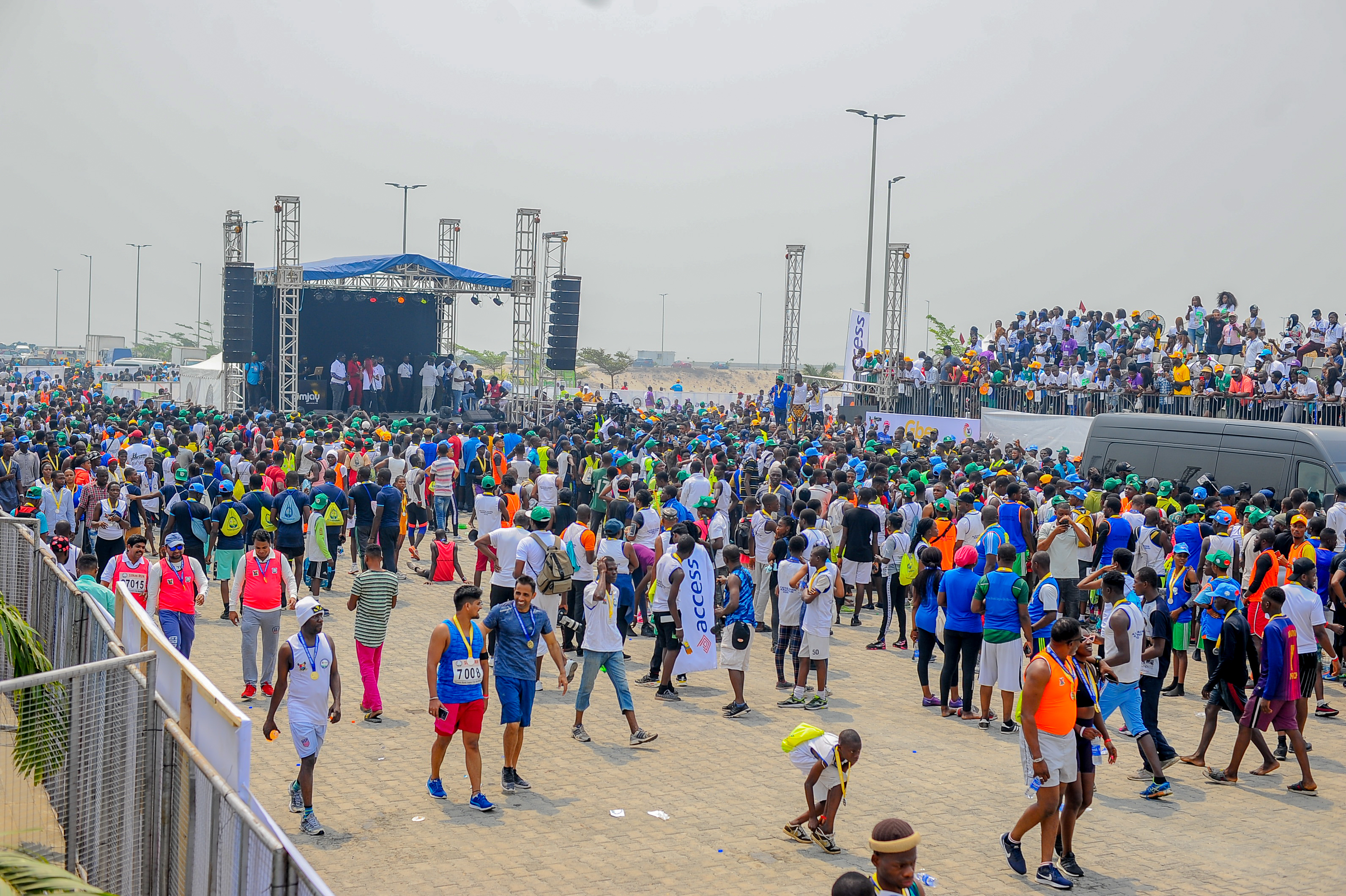
- Closing gala at the 202 Lagos Marathon
- Location: Lagos
- Event type: Road
- Distance: Marathon, half marathon
- Primary sponsor: Access Bank
- Established: 2016
- Course records: Men: 2:10:23 (Kenya) David Barmasai (2020); Women: 2:31:40 (Kenya) Sharon Cherop (2020)
- Website: Lagos City Marathon
- Participants: 841 (2019)

The Lagos Marathon is a gold label marathon held annually in Lagos, Nigeria.

== Overview ==
The origins of the event trace back to 1983 when the first marathon took place. The Lagos International Marathon is organized by the Athletic Federation of Nigeria and was preceded by several recurring half marathons held in the city where athletes like John Cheruiyot Korir, Paul Malakwen Kosgei and Dieudonné Disi emerged as winners. The Marathon course, which spans a distance of about 42 km, starts at National Stadium, Surulere, Lagos, (where previous half marathons initially finished), continues along the Third Mainland Bridge, to the Lekki-Ikoyi link bridge and finishes at Eko Atlantic.

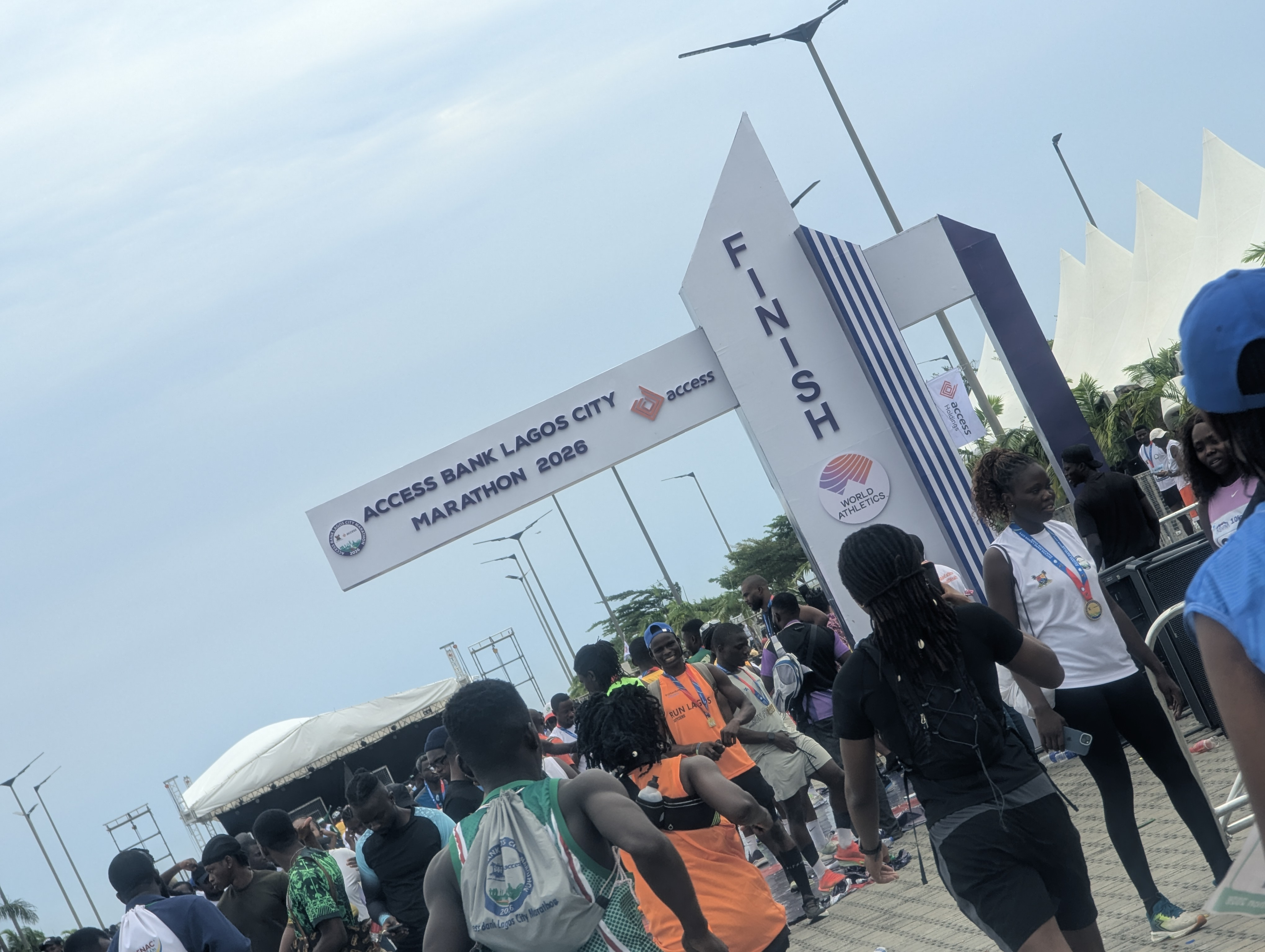
Lagos City Marathon 2026

== 2016 ==
Over 20,000 athletes competed on 6 February 2016 event which was sponsored by Access Bank. The marathon course record was held by a Kenyan national, Abraham Kiptum who completed the race in 2 hours, 16 minutes and 21 seconds. The fastest woman was an Ethiopian national Halima Hussein Kayo, who ran a time of 2 hours, 38 minutes and 36 seconds.

== 2017 ==
Kenyan national Abraham Kiptum defended his title, finishing the race in 2 hours 15 minutes 20 seconds while his female compatriot Rodah Jepkori Tanuyi emerged as the first-place winner in the women's category.

== 2018 ==
In the event of 10 February 2018; French-Kenyan national Abraham Kiprotich finished the race while setting a new record time of 2:13:04 hours in the men's category while Ethiopian national Guta Alemenesh Herpha Guta came first in the women's category.

A 10 km Family Race starting at Lekki Roundabout to Eko Atlantic was introduced in the 2018 edition to encourage participation from non professional runners for fitness, fun and health purposes.

== 2019 ==
Out of about 100,000 competitors in the 2019 edition which held on Saturday, 2 February, Ethiopian national, Sintayehu Legese won the race in a finishing time of 2 hours 17 minutes 28 seconds in the men's category. His female compatriot Dinke Meserete finished first in the women's category.

== 2020 ==
The 42 km race commenced from National Stadium, Surulere, Lagos and ended at Eko Atlantic, Lagos. Both male and female 42 km runners competed for the grand prize of $50,000 while the second and third-place winners $40,000 and $30,000 respectively.

The race ended with Kenyan Olympian David Barmasai winning with a course record of 2:10:00 (Unofficial) and was awarded a cash prize of $70,000. And another Kenyan Sharon Cherop also won the female category.

== Winners ==
Key: Course record

Edition	Year	Men's winner	Time (min:sec)	Women's winner	Time (h:m:s)
1st	2016	Abraham Kiptum (KEN)	2:16:19	Halima Hassen (ETH)	2:38:36
2nd	2017	Abraham Kiptum (KEN)	2:15:23	Rodah Jepkorir (KEN)	2:37:52
3rd	2018	Abraham Kiprotich (FRA)	2:15:04	Almenesh Herpa (ETH)	2:38:25
4th	2019	Sintayehu Legese (ETH)	2:17:28	Meseret Dinke (ETH)	2:48:02
5th	2020	David Barmasai (KEN)	2:10:23	Sharon Cherop (KEN)	2:31:40
6th	2021	Emmanuel Naibei (KEN)	2:15:04	Meseret Dinke (ETH)	2:32:16
7th	2022	Deresa Geleta (ETH)	2:11:58	Siranesh Yirga (ETH)	2:33:54
8th	2023	Edwin Kibet Koech (KEN)	2:14:06	Almenesh Herpa (ETH)	2:40:42
9th	2024	Bernard Sang (KEN)	2:16:49	Kebene Chala (ETH)	2:43:32
10th	2025	Edwin Kibet Koech (KEN)	2:14:19	Guta Meseret Hirpa (ETH)	2:37:04

== 2020 Edition ==
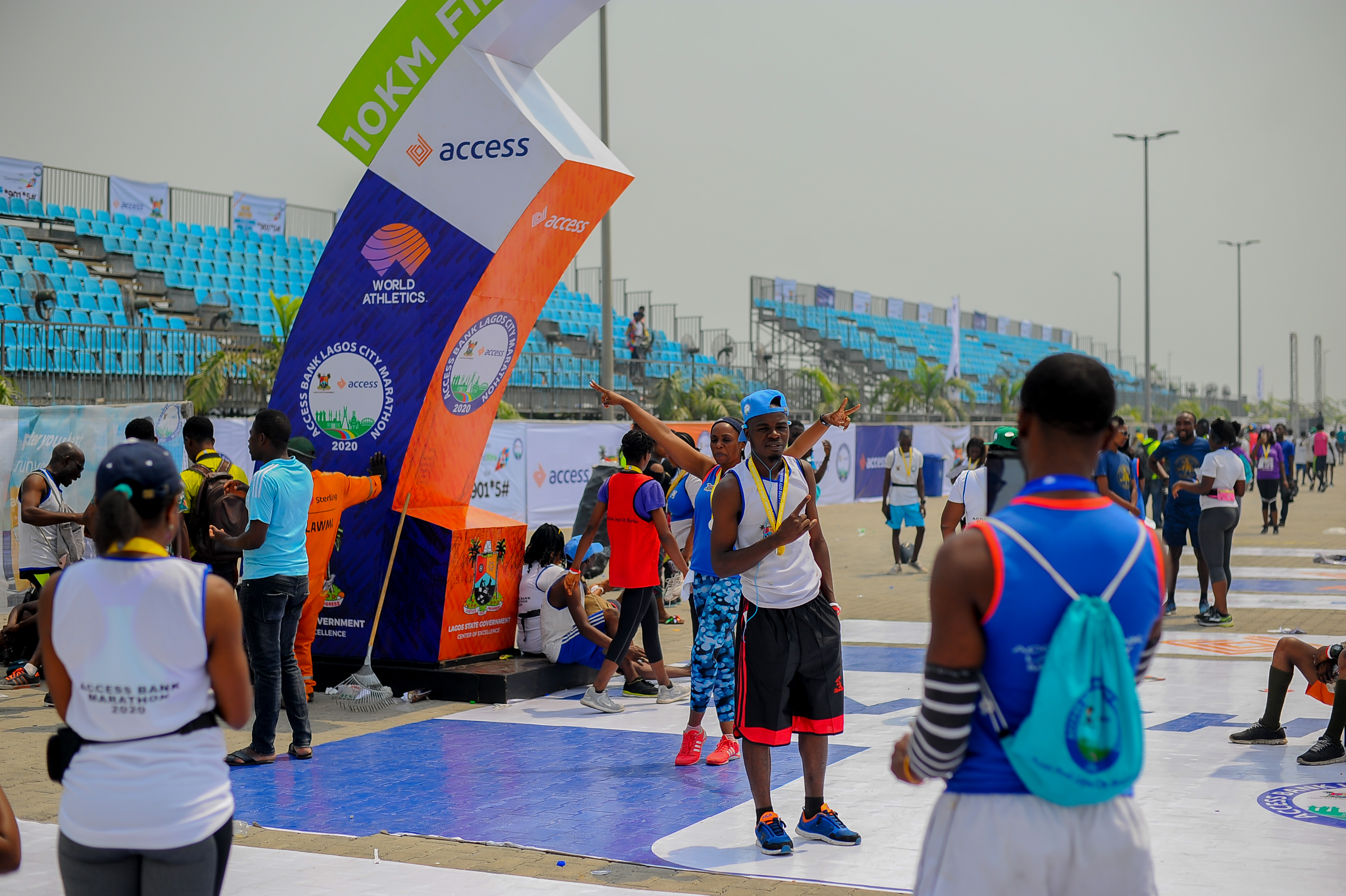

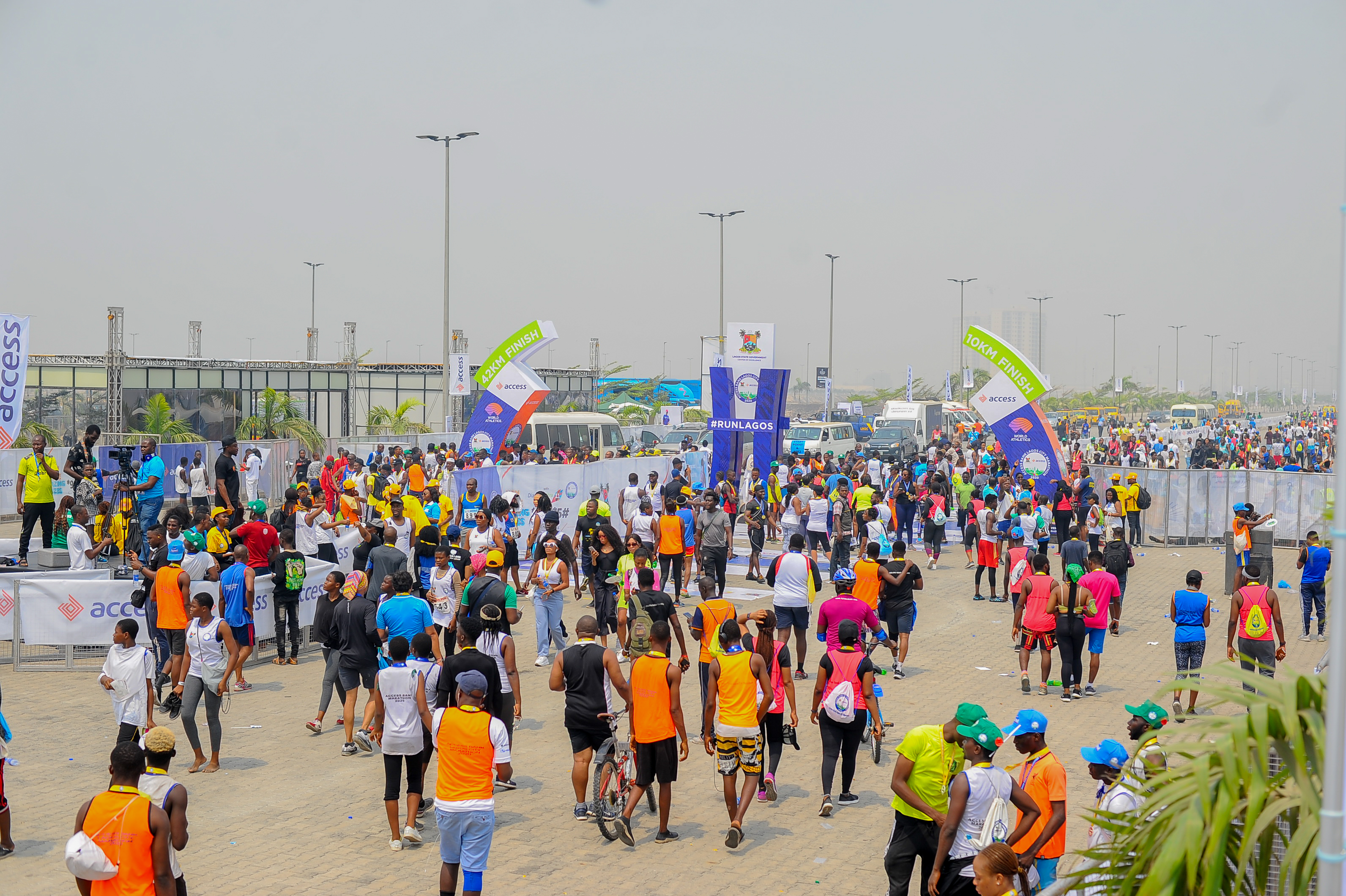

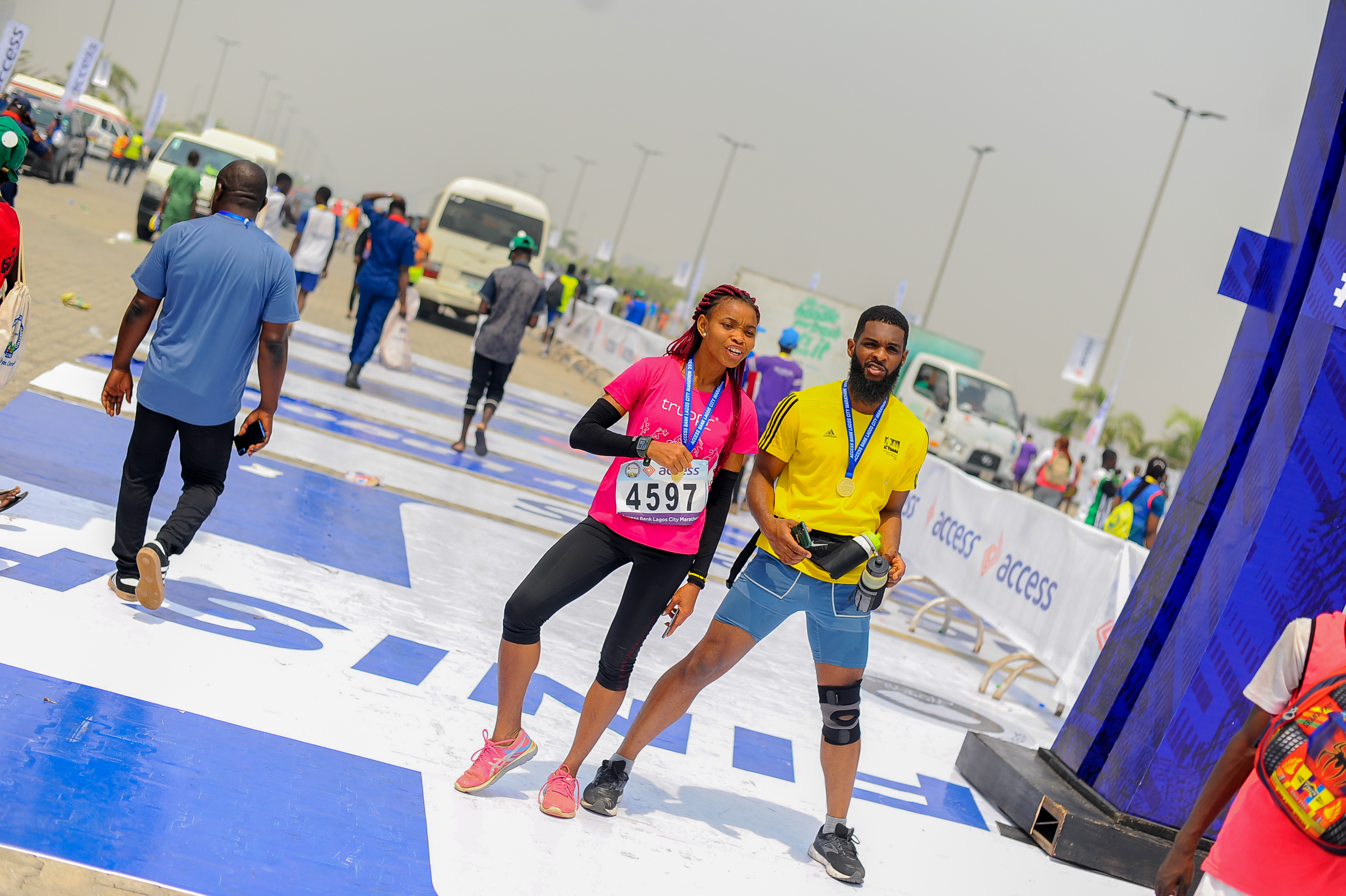

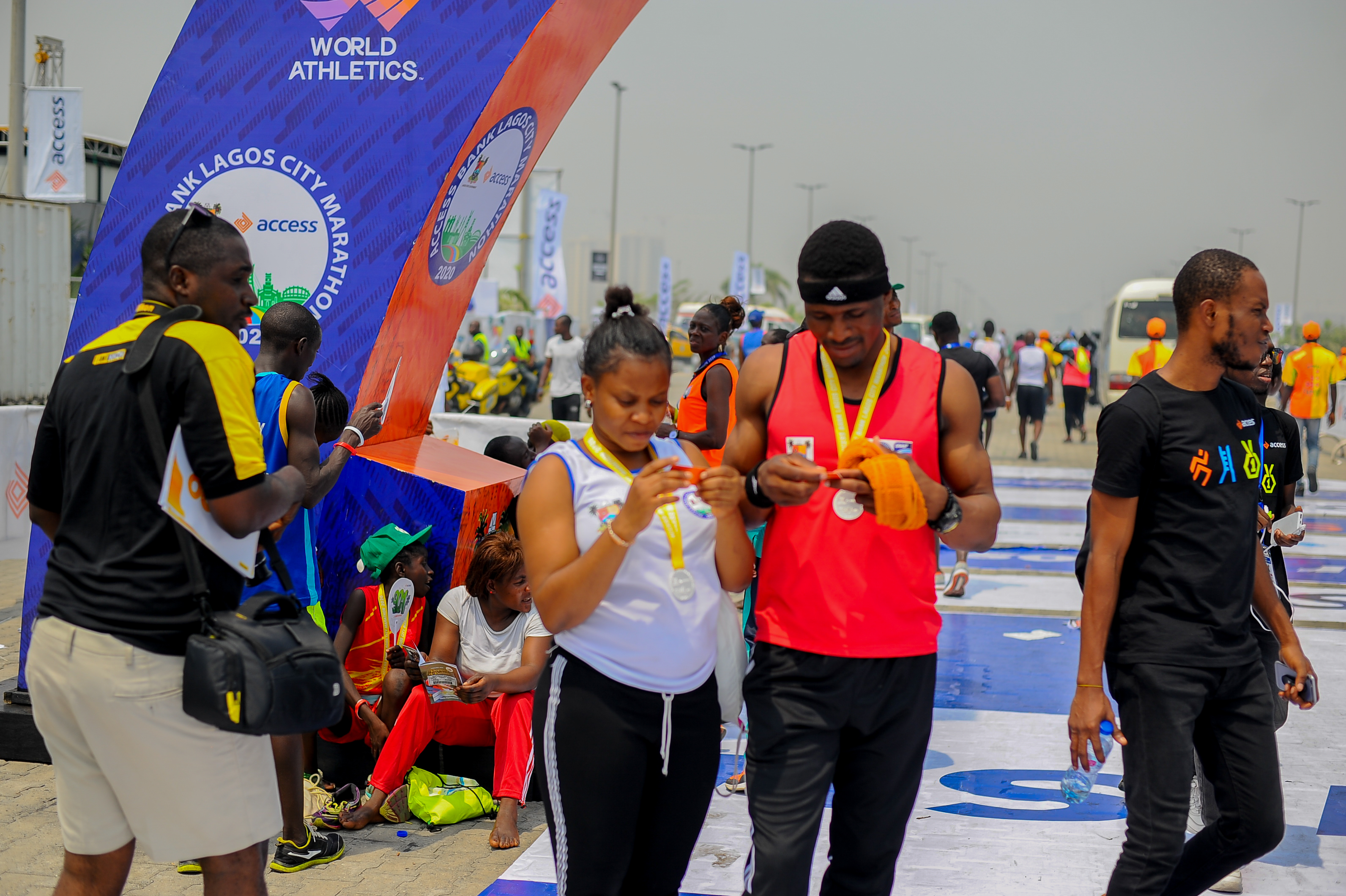

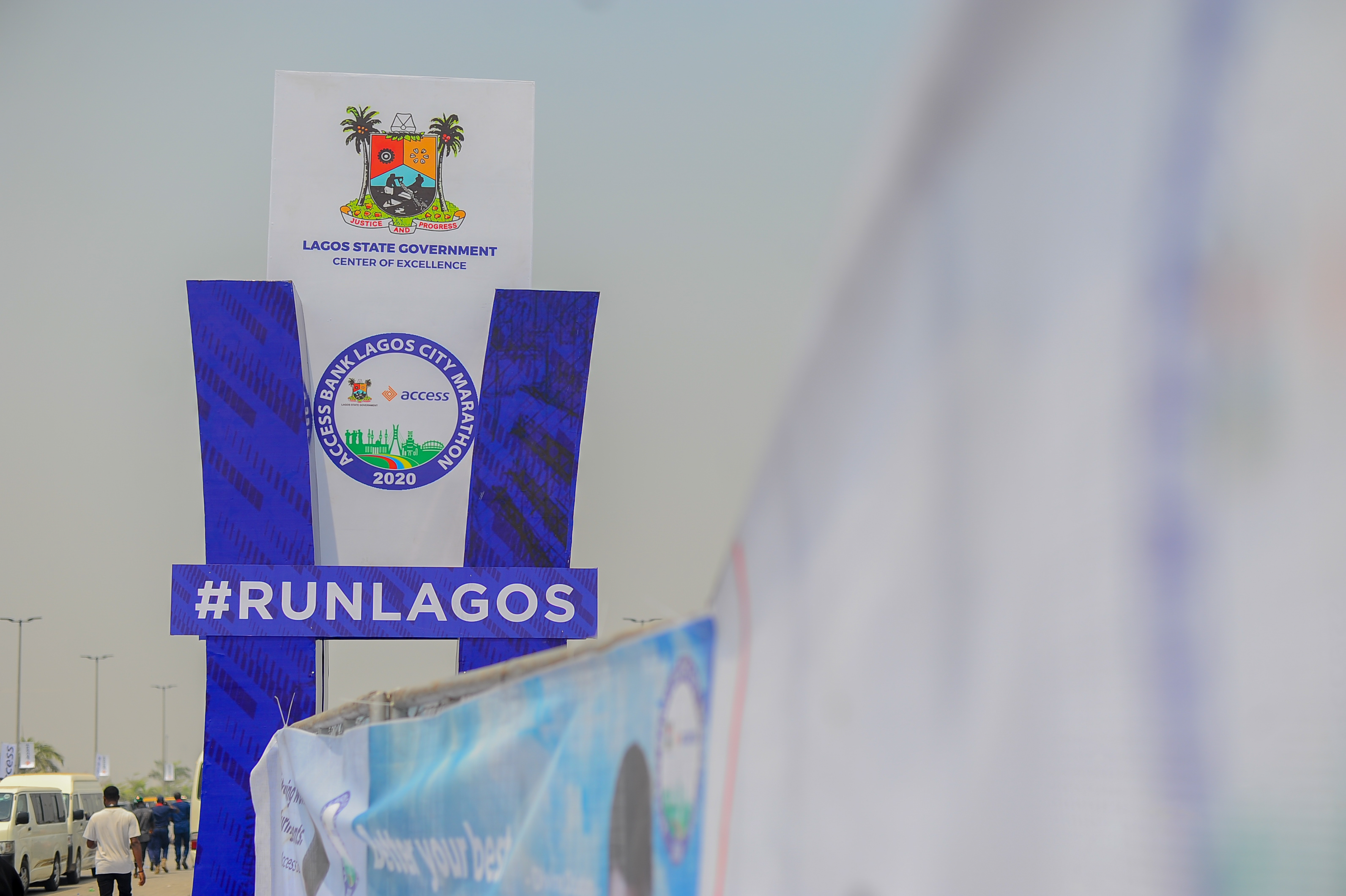

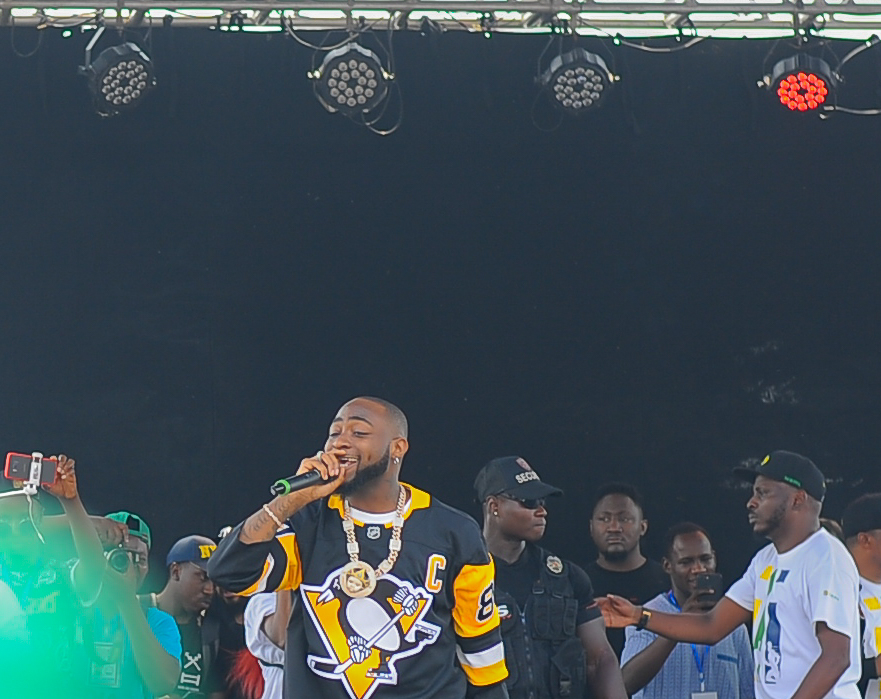
