= Morocco at the 2017 World Championships in Athletics =

- WA code: MAR

in London
- Competitors: 15 in 8 events
- Medals Ranked =31th: Gold 0 Silver 1 Bronze 0 Total 1

World Championships in Athletics appearances
- 1983; 1987; 1991; 1993; 1995; 1997; 1999; 2001; 2003; 2005; 2007; 2009; 2011; 2013; 2015; 2017; 2019; 2022; 2023

Morocco competed at the 2017 World Championships in Athletics in London, United Kingdom, from 4 to 13 August 2017.

== Medalists ==
Medal	Name	Event	Date
Silver	Soufiane El Bakkali	Men's 3000 m Steeplechase	August 8

== Results ==
(q – qualified, NM – no mark, SB – season best)

=== Men ===
Track and road events

Athlete	Event	Heat		Semifinal		Final	
Athlete	Event	Result	Rank	Result	Rank	Result	Rank
Abdelati El Guesse	800 metres	1:46.74	23	Did not advance			
Mostafa Smaili	800 metres	1:47.50	31	Did not advance			
Brahim Akachab	1500 metres	DNS	–	Did not advance			
Fouad Elkaam	1500 metres	3:39.33	7 q	3:38.64	5 Q	3:37.72	11
Abdalaati Iguider	1500 metres	3:46.03	27 Q	3:40.76	17	Did not advance	
Soufiyan Bouqantar	5000 metres	13:30.78	21	—		Did not advance	
Brahim Kaazouzi	5000 metres	DNF	–	—		Did not advance	
Mohamed Reda El Aaraby	Marathon	—				2:17.50	30
Soufiane El Bakkali	3000 metres steeplechase	8:22.60	5 Q	—		8:14.49	2nd place, silver medalist(s)
Hicham Sigueni	3000 metres steeplechase	8:44.74	36	—		Did not advance	
Mohamed Tindouft	3000 metres steeplechase	8:40.99	34	—		Did not advance	

Field events

Athlete	Event	Qualification		Final	
Athlete	Event	Distance	Position	Distance	Position
Yahya Berrabah	Long jump	7.49	28	Did not advance	

=== Women ===
Track and road events

Athlete	Event	Heat		Semifinal		Final	
Athlete	Event	Result	Rank	Result	Rank	Result	Rank
Malika Akkaoui	1500 metres	4:09.05	28 Q	4:05.73	11 Q	4:05.87	10
Rababe Arafi	1500 metres	4:03.67	11 Q	4:05.75	12 q	4:04.35	8
Fadwa Sidi Madane	3000 metres steeplechase	9:40.61	18	—		Did not advance	
