= Morocco at the 2011 World Championships in Athletics =

- WA code: MAR
- National federation: Fédération Royale Marocaine d’Athlétisme
- Website: www.frma.ma

in Daegu
- Competitors: 19
- Medals: Gold 0 Silver 0 Bronze 0 Total 0

World Championships in Athletics appearances
- 1983; 1987; 1991; 1993; 1995; 1997; 1999; 2001; 2003; 2005; 2007; 2009; 2011; 2013; 2015; 2017; 2019; 2022; 2023

Morocco competed at the 2011 World Championships in Athletics from August 27 to September 4 in Daegu, South Korea.

== Team selection ==
The Fédération Royale Marocaine d’Athlétisme announced the final team of 19 athletes to represent the country in the event. The men's team will be headed by 1500m specialist Amine Laâlou and the women's team by 800m specialist Halima Hachlaf. Hicham Sigueni was added for 5000m. However, the final team on the entry list comprises again the names of only 19 athletes without Hicham Sigueni.

The following athlete appeared on the preliminary Entry List, but not on the Official Start List of the specific event:

KEY:	Did not participate	Competed in another event

	Event	Athlete
Women	800 metres	Malika Akkaoui

== Results ==
=== Men ===
Athlete	Event	Preliminaries		Heats		Semifinals		Final	
Athlete	Event	Time Width Height	Rank	Time Width Height	Rank	Time Width Height	Rank	Time Width Height	Rank
Aziz Ouhadi	100 metres			10.42	24 Q	10.45	20	Did not advance	
Mouhcine El Amine	800 metres			1:46.98	22	Did not advance			
Abdelaâti Iguider	1500 metres			3:41.41	21 Q	3:46.89	17 Q	3:36.56	5
Mohamed Moustaoui	1500 metres			3:39.35	5 Q	3:36.87	3 Q	3:36.80	6
Amine Laâlou	1500 metres			3:39.86	8 Q	3:47.65	19	Did not advance	
Abderrahime Bouramdane	Marathon							2:10:55	4
Rachid Kisri	Marathon							2:13:24	11
Ahmed Baday	Marathon							2:17:59	27
Abderrahim Goumri	Marathon							DNF	
Adil Ennani	Marathon							DNF	
Abdelkader Hachlaf	3000 metres steeplechase			8:46.12	32			Did not advance	
Hamid Ezzine	3000 metres steeplechase			8:11.81	3 Q			8:21.97	9
Yahya Berrabah	Long jump	8.05	9					8.23	4

=== Women ===
Athlete	Event	Preliminaries		Heats		Semifinals		Final	
Athlete	Event	Time Width Height	Rank	Time Width Height	Rank	Time Width Height	Rank	Time Width Height	Rank
Halima Hachlaf	800 metres			2:01.80	16	DNF		Did not advance	
Siham Hilali	1500 metres			4:13.59	21 Q	4:09.64	16	Did not advance	
Btissam Lakhouad	1500 metres			4:10.71	13 Q	4:08.10	5 Q	4:06.18	4
Malika Akkaoui	1500 metres			4:14.79	31	Did not advance			
Hanane Ouhaddou	3000 metres steeplechase			9:25.96 SB	4			9:32.36	8
Salima El Ouali Alami	3000 metres steeplechase			10:07.71	29			Did not advance	
