= Morocco at the 2022 World Athletics Championships =

- WA code: MAR
- National federation: Fédération Royale Marocaine d'Athlétisme

in Eugene, United States 15 – 24 July 2022
- Competitors: 15 (14 men and 1 woman)
- Medals Ranked 22nd: Gold 1 Silver 0 Bronze 0 Total 1

World Athletics Championships appearances
- 1983; 1987; 1991; 1993; 1995; 1997; 1999; 2001; 2003; 2005; 2007; 2009; 2011; 2013; 2015; 2017; 2019; 2022; 2023

Morocco competed at the 2022 World Championships in Athletics in Eugene, Oregon, United States. The country is currently in 22nd place in the medal table.

== Medalists ==
Medal	Athlete	Event	Date
Gold	Soufiane El Bakkali	Men's 3000 metres steeplechase	July 18

== Results ==
Morocco has entered 15 athletes.

Key

- Q = Qualified for the next round
- q = Qualified for the next round as a fastest loser or, in field events, by position without achieving the qualifying target
- NR = National record
- PB = Personal best
- SB = Season best
- N/A = Round not applicable for the event

=== Men ===
Track and road events

Athlete	Event	Heat		Semifinals		Final	
Athlete	Event	Result	Rank	Result	Rank	Result	Rank
Abdelati El Guesse	800 metres	1:45.25 =SB	7 Q	1:46.46	18	Did not advance	
Elhassane Moujahid	800 metres	1:49.27	36 Q	1:47.18	23	Did not advance	
Moad Zahafi	800 metres	1:46.15	17 Q	1:46.35	17	Did not advance	
Anass Essayi	1500 metres	3:38.60 SB	22	Did not advance			
Elhassane Moujahid	1500 metres	3:39.98	35	Did not advance			
Abdelatif Sadiki	1500 metres	3:38.60	21	Did not advance			
Hicham Akankam	5000 metres	14:05.11	37	—		Did not advance	
Soufiyan Bouqantar	5000 metres	13:37.69	26	—		Did not advance	
Zouhair Talbi	10,000 metres	—				28:28.69	21
Mohamed Reda El Aaraby	Marathon	—				2:10:33	21
Othmane El Goumri	Marathon	—				2:08:14	12
Hamza Sahli	Marathon	—				2:08:45	14
Salaheddine Ben Yazide	3000 metres steeplechase	8:38.46	35	—		Did not advance	
Soufiane El Bakkali	3000 metres steeplechase	8:16.65	1 Q	—		8:25.13	1st place, gold medalist(s)
Mohamed Tindouft	3000 metres steeplechase	DNF		—		Did not advance	

=== Women ===
Track and road events

Athlete	Event	Heat		Semifinal		Final	
Athlete	Event	Result	Rank	Result	Rank	Result	Rank
Assia Raziki	800 metres	2:03.77	39	Did not advance			
