= David Barmasai Tumo =

Kenyan long-distance runner

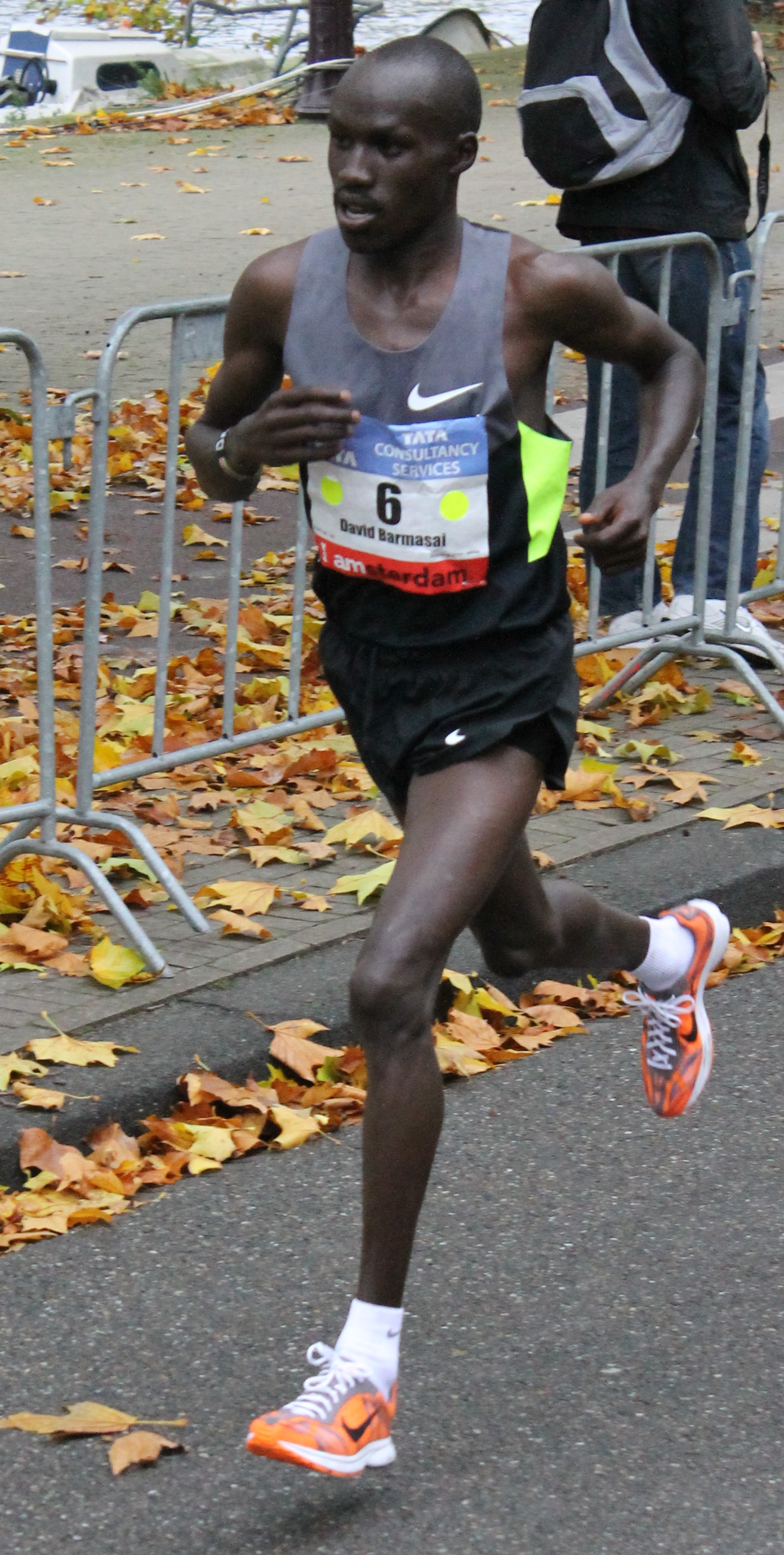

David Barmasai Tumo (born 1 January 1989) is a Kenyan long-distance runner who specialises in marathon running. He has a personal best of 2:07:18 hours (set winning the 2011 Dubai Marathon) and came fifth at the 2011 World Championships in Athletics.

== Biography ==
Raised near Eldoret in Kenya's Uasin Gishu District, Barmasai took up running seriously in 2009 and hoped to emulate the success of William Kiplagat (the 2003 Rotterdam Marathon winner). By the end of the year Barmasai entered his first elite marathon race in Eldoret and he won in a time of 2:16:00 hours. He signed up with European athletics manager Jos Hermens and, after injuries interrupted his 2010 training, he ran his second marathon race at the high-altitude Nairobi Marathon, which he won in an improved time of 2:10:31 hours.

Barmasai entered the high-profile 2011 Dubai Marathon with the aim of reaching the top ten. Making his debut in an overseas race, he led the race throughout and saw off more experienced runners such as Eliud Kiptanui and Evans Cheruiyot to take his third straight win in a time of 2:07:18 hours – almost one minute ahead of the field. He received US$250,000 for winning the race. In light of this achievement, he gained selection for the Kenyan national team at the 2011 World Championships in Athletics. On his first outing representing Kenya, he came fifth in the World Championships Marathon in Daegu, helping Kenya to a dominant win in the IAAF World Marathon Cup team competition. His last race of the year came at the Zevenheuvelenloop 15K, although he only managed ninth place in a time of 45:14 minutes.

He ran at the 2012 Boston Marathon, but lost his undefeated streak on the road circuit as he came in eighth place.

And on 8 February 2020 he won the Lagos City Marathon with a course record time of 2:10:00, winning the grand prize of $50,000 and an extra $20,000 for breaking the four-year record.

He is married with one child. He recently won the Lagos City Marathon 2020 and Singapore Marathon 2023.
