= Eritrea at the 2011 World Championships in Athletics =

- WA code: ERI
- National federation: Eritrean National Athletics Federation

in Daegu
- Competitors: 9
- Medals: Gold 0 Silver 0 Bronze 0 Total 0

World Championships in Athletics appearances
- 1997; 1999; 2001; 2003; 2005; 2007; 2009; 2011; 2013; 2015; 2017; 2019; 2022; 2023

Eritrea competed at the 2011 World Championships in Athletics from August 27 to September 4 in Daegu, South Korea.

== Team selection ==
A team of 9 athletes was announced to represent the country in the event. The team will be led by Zersenay Tadese, a 2009 World Championships 10,000m silver medallist, and Olympic bronze medalist.

The following athletes appeared on the preliminary Entry List, but not on the Official Start List of the specific event:

KEY:	Did not participate	Competed in another event

	Event	Athlete
Men	5000 metres	Zersenay Tadese
Men	5000 metres	Teklemariam Medhin

== Results ==
=== Men ===
Athlete	Event	Preliminaries		Heats		Semifinals		Final	
Athlete	Event	Time Width Height	Rank	Time Width Height	Rank	Time Width Height	Rank	Time Width Height	Rank
Amanuel Mesel	5000 metres			13:39.97	14 q			13:33.99	11
Goitom Kifle	5000 metres			14:06.42	31			Did not advance	
Zersenay Tadese	10,000 metres							27:22.57	4
Teklemariam Medhin	10,000 metres							DNS	
Beraki Beyene Zerea	Marathon							2:16:03 SB	17
Samuel Goitom	Marathon							2:25:42 SB	43
Yared Asmerom	Marathon							DNF	
Yonas Kifle	Marathon							DNF	
Michael Tesfay	Marathon							DNF	
