= Morocco at the 2019 World Athletics Championships =

Morocco at the 2019 World Championships in Athletics
- WA code: MAR

in Doha, Qatar
- Medals Ranked 31st: Gold 0 Silver 0 Bronze 1 Total 1

World Championships in Athletics appearances
- 1983; 1987; 1991; 1993; 1995; 1997; 1999; 2001; 2003; 2005; 2007; 2009; 2011; 2013; 2015; 2017; 2019; 2022; 2023

Morocco competed at the 2019 World Championships in Athletics in Doha, Qatar from 27 September to 6 October 2019. The country finished in 31st place in the medal table.

== Medalists ==
Medal	Athlete	Event	Date
Bronze	Soufiane El Bakkali	Men's 3000 metres steeplechase	October 4

== Results ==
(q – qualified, NM – no mark, SB – season best)

=== Men ===
Track and road events

Athlete	Event	Heat		Semi-final		Final	
Athlete	Event	Result	Rank	Result	Rank	Result	Rank
Oussama Nabil	800 metres	1:46.17	20 q	Disqualified		Did not advance	
Mostafa Smaili	800 metres	1:45.27	2 Q	1:45.78	12	Did not advance	
Mouad Zahafi	800 metres	1:46.56	27	Did not advance			
Abdelaati Iguider	1500 metres	3:37.44	14 Q	3:42.23	25	Did not advance	
Brahim Kaazouzi	1500 metres	Did not start		Did not advance			
Hicham Ouladha	1500 metres	3:39.86	33	Did not advance			
Soufiyan Bouqantar	5000 metres	14:03.16	31	—		Did not advance	
Mohamed Reda El Aaraby	Marathon	—				Did not finish	
Hamza Sahli	Marathon	—				2:11:49	8
Abdelkarim Ben Zahra	3000 metres steeplechase	8:36.67	36	—		Did not advance	
Soufiane El Bakkali	3000 metres steeplechase	8:17.96	7 Q	—		8:03.76 SB	3rd place, bronze medalist(s)
Mohamed Tindouft	3000 metres steeplechase	Did not finish		—		Did not advance	

Field events

Athlete	Event	Qualification		Final	
Athlete	Event	Distance	Position	Distance	Position
Yahya Berrabah	Long jump	7.37	26	Did not advance	

=== Women ===
Track and road events

Athlete	Event	Heat		Semi-final		Final	
Athlete	Event	Result	Rank	Result	Rank	Result	Rank
Malika Akkaoui	800 metres	2:03.40	27	Did not advance			
Rababe Arafi	800 metres	2:03.44	29 Q	2:00.80	11 Q	2:00.48	7
Halima Hachlaf	800 metres	2:01.50	7 Q	2:01.30	16	Did not advance	
Malika Akkaoui	1500 metres	4:08.05	16 Q	4:16.83	20	Did not advance	
Rababe Arafi	1500 metres	4:08.32	19 Q	4:14.94	14 Q	3:59.93	9
Lamiae Lhabze	400 metres hurdles	58.44	35	Did not advance			
