= Feyisa Lilesa =

Ethiopian long-distance runner (born 1990)

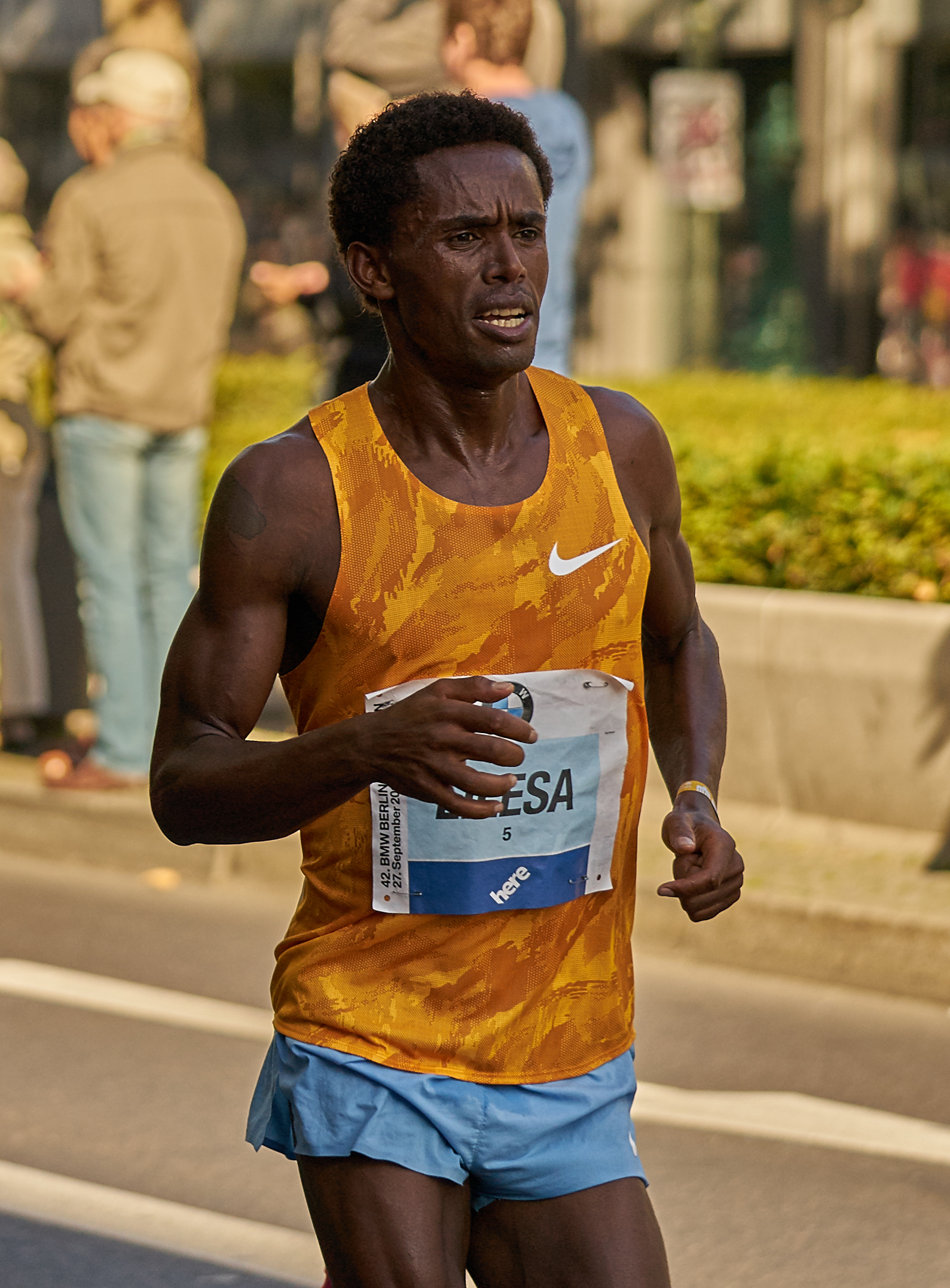
- Feyisa at the 2015 Berlin Marathon
- Born: 1 February 1990 (age 36); Jeldu, Shewa, Ethiopia
- Sports career
- Nationality: Ethiopian
- Event: Long-distance running

Sports achievements and titles
- Personal best: Chicago Marathon: 2:04:52 (2012)
Medal record
Men's athletics
Representing Ethiopia
Olympic Games
| Silver medal – second place | 2016 Rio de Janeiro | Marathon |
World Championships
| Bronze medal – third place | 2011 Daegu | Marathon |
- Military career
- Allegiance: Ethiopia
- Branch: Ethiopian Army
- Conflicts / operations: Tigray War

Feyisa Lilesa (Afaan Oromo: Fayyisaa Leellisaa; born 1 February 1990) is an Ethiopian long-distance runner. He became the youngest man to run under 2:06 when he ran 2:05:23 in the men's marathon at the 2010 Rotterdam Marathon. He set his personal best of 2:04:52 in the marathon when he came in second place at the 2012 Chicago Marathon.

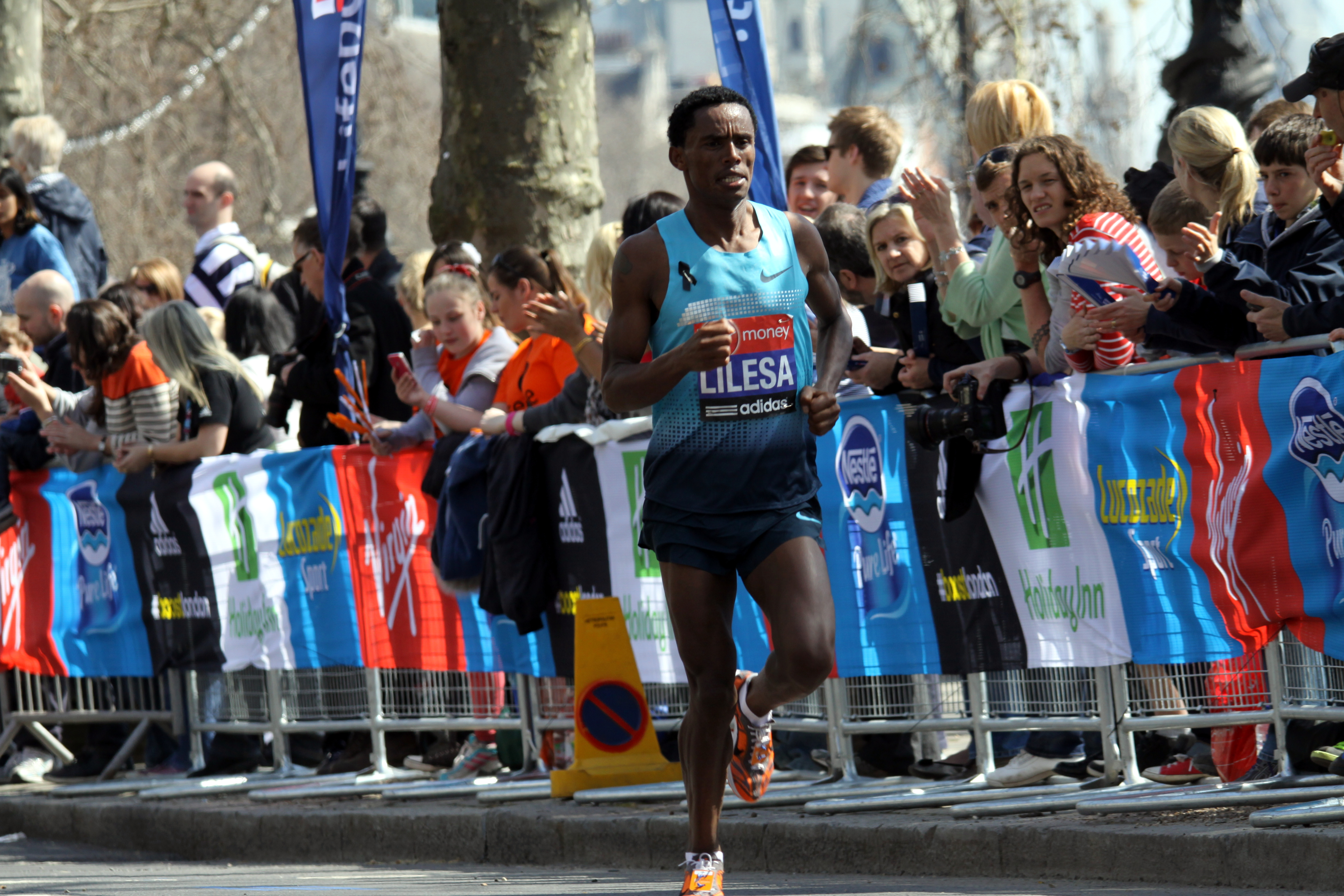
Feyisa Lilesa during 2013 London Marathon

He won the Dublin Marathon in 2009 in his debut race and won the Xiamen International Marathon in 2010. He was the bronze medalist at the 2011 World Championships marathon and the silver medalist in the 2016 Rio Olympics marathon. On the final day of the 2016 Rio Olympics (21 August), as he was crossing the finish line of the Men's Marathon and winning his silver medal, he raised his arms in a gesture of solidarity with protestors against the killing of the Oromo people in his native Ethiopia. Citing fear for his life if he returned to Ethiopia, he said in a press conference following the race that he would, "try and move to another country." One of the countries he mentioned was the U.S. and the State Department was asked about this possibility.

After the resignation of Ethiopian Prime Minister Hailemariam Desalegn in March 2018, his successor Abiy Ahmed encouraged Feyisa to return home to his country in October 2018, ending his two-year exile.

== Career ==
He entered international competition in 2008 and his first major competition was the 2008 IAAF World Cross Country Championships, where his 14th-place finish in the junior race helped the Ethiopians to the team silver medals. He ran at the inaugural edition of the World 10K Bangalore in May and was fifth in a time of 28:35.

Feyisa made his senior breakthrough the following year, stepping up a level at the 2009 IAAF World Cross Country Championships and scoring a senior team silver medal by finishing in 12th place. That April he headed to the United States to compete in the Crescent City Classic in New Orleans. He set a 10K best of 28:20 to finish as runner-up behind Mark Kiptoo. He upped the distance by running at the Rock 'n' Roll Virginia Beach Half Marathon in September. He set a time of 1:02:15 but again he was beaten into second place by a Kenyan rival, this time in the form of William Chebor. He made his marathon debut he following month, competing at the Dublin Marathon. He took the lead from two-time winner Aleksey Sokolov and went unrivalled in his first race over the distance, beating Sokolov by a margin of a minute and a half. His time of 2:09:12 was a strong debut run, although he missed the course record by five seconds.

He improved further at the Xiamen International Marathon in January 2010, breaking Samuel Muturi Mugo's year-old course record with a time of 2:08:47 to gain his first win at a major marathon. He knocked a significant margin off that time at the Rotterdam Marathon, where he finished in 2:05:23. This time made him the third fastest Ethiopian (and non-Kenyan runner) ever behind compatriots Haile Gebrselassie and Tsegay Kebede. However, this time only brought him fourth place in Rotterdam as the competition was one of the strongest ever—podium finishers Patrick Makau, Geoffrey Mutai, and Vincent Kipruto all moved into the top-10 all-time fastest marathon runners. He ran at the 2010 Chicago Marathon in October and kept pace with the race leaders, Tsegaye Kebede and Samuel Wanjiru, up to the 20-mile mark. He faded behind them afterwards, however, and finished in third with a time of 2:08:10. Feyisa Lilesa was among the earlier front runners of the Delhi Half Marathon the following month, but eventually finished in fifth place.

He was part of the silver medal-winning Ethiopian team at the 2011 IAAF World Cross Country Championships, where he finished in seventeenth place. He ran at the Rotterdam Marathon in April, but was somewhat off the pace and finished seventh, more than six minutes behind the winner. He was chosen to represent Ethiopia at the 2011 World Championships in Athletics and ran a season's best time of 2:10:32 hours to take the bronze medal.

He began 2012 with a significant improvement in the half marathon, taking the Houston Half Marathon title with a course record time of 59:22 minutes. He entered the RAK Half Marathon the following month but was two minutes slower and ended the race in fifth place. He came third at the New York City Half Marathon in March, finishing behind fellow Ethiopian Deriba Merga. At the World 10K Bangalore he again missed the podium, falling back to fourth in the latter stages. He did not make the Ethiopian team for the 2012 Summer Olympics and that July he was runner-up at the Bogotá Half Marathon. He reached new heights in the marathon at the 2012 Chicago Marathon – he duelled against Tsegaye Kebede in the final stages and finished as runner-up with a personal best of 2:04:52 hours. He retained his half marathon title in Houston at the start of 2013 and came fourth at the RAK Half Marathon a month later. Feyisa won the national cross country title at the Jan Meda International, earning selection for the global race.

At the 2016 Summer Olympics, at which he won the silver medal in the Marathon, he crossed his wrists as a sign of support for his Oromo people who face relocation under a government program to allocate land surrounding the capital for industrial development, that prompted fierce demonstrations in November 2015 that lasted for months. The Oromos were using the same gesture in their protests. Feyisa also said that his gesture might lead to retribution on his return, and that he might be forced to leave his homeland. At a press conference held in Washington, D.C., on 14 September 2016, Feyisa urged the international community, particularly the United States which is an ally of Ethiopia, to put pressure on the Ethiopian government to give the people their rights lest an ethnic conflict follow the recent wave of protests. Despite his protest, he said that he would still like to run representing his country, Ethiopia.

In 2021, Feyisa enlisted in the Ethiopian Army to fight in the Tigray War.

== Personal bests ==
| Event | Time (h:m:s) | Venue | Date |
|---|---|---|---|
| 10 km | 27:38 | Rovereto, Italy | 4 October 2008 |
| Half marathon | 59:22 | Houston, Texas, United States | 15 January 2012 |
| Marathon | 2:04:52 | Chicago, Illinois | 7 October 2012 |

- All information taken from IAAF profile.

== Achievements ==
| Year | Competition | Venue | Position | Event | Notes |
Representing Ethiopia
| 2009 | Dublin Marathon | Dublin, Ireland | 1st | Marathon | 2:09:12 |
| 2010 | Xiamen International Marathon | Xiamen, China | 1st | Marathon | 2:08:47 |
| 2010 | Rotterdam Marathon | Rotterdam, Netherlands | 4th | Marathon | 2:05:23 |
| 2010 | Chicago Marathon | Chicago, United States | 3rd | Marathon | 2:08:10 |
| 2011 | Rotterdam Marathon | Rotterdam, Netherlands | 7th | Marathon | 2:11:42 |
| 2011 | World Championships | Daegu, South Korea | 3rd | Marathon | 2:10:32 |
| 2012 | London Marathon | London, England | 9th | Marathon | 2:08:20 |
| 2012 | Chicago Marathon | Chicago, United States | 2nd | Marathon | 2:04:52 |
| 2013 | London Marathon | London, England | 4th | Marathon | 2:07:46 |
| 2014 | London Marathon | London, England | 9th | Marathon | 2:08:26 |
| 2015 | Dubai Marathon | Dubai, United Arab Emirates | 4th | Marathon | 2:06:35 |
| 2015 | Rotterdam Marathon | Rotterdam, Netherlands | 5th | Marathon | 2:09:55 |
| 2015 | Berlin Marathon | Berlin, Germany | 3rd | Marathon | 2:06:57 |
| 2016 | Tokyo Marathon | Tokyo, Japan | 1st | Marathon | 2:06:56 |
| 2016 | Olympic Games | Rio de Janeiro, Brazil | 2nd | Marathon | 2:09:54 |
| 2017 | United Airlines NYC Half | New York, United States | 1st | Half Marathon | 1:00:04 |
| 2017 | Bogotá Half Marathon | Bogotá, Colombia | 1st | Half Marathon | 1:04:30 |
