= Vincent Kipruto =

Kenyan marathon runner (born 1987)

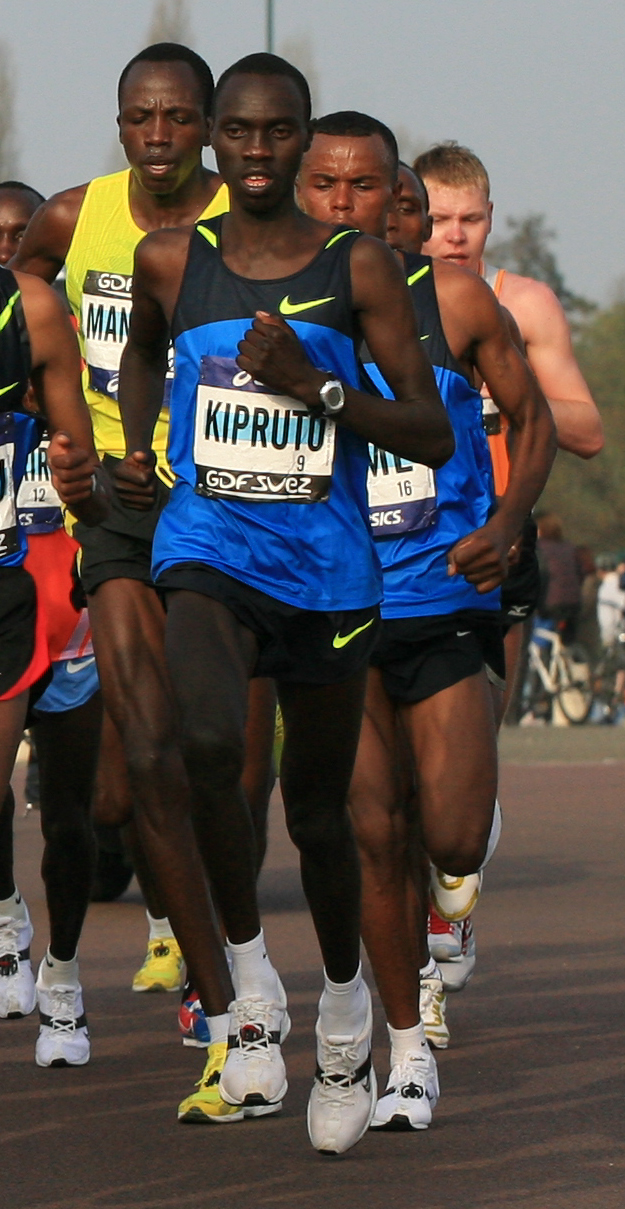
- Kipruto en route to victory at the 2009 Paris Marathon

Medal record

Men's athletics

Representing Kenya

World Championships
Silver medal – second place	2011 Daegu	Marathon

Vincent Kipruto Limo (born 13 September 1987) is a Kenyan long-distance runner who specialises in the marathon. He made his debut in the event in 2008 and won the Paris Marathon a year later. He then placed top three at the Chicago Marathon and the Rotterdam Marathon (where he ran a personal best of 2:05:13 hours).

In his first international appearance he won the silver medal at the 2011 World Championships in Athletics. He won the 2013 Lake Biwa Marathon and Frankfurt Marathon.

== Career ==
Born in the south of Kenya's Keiyo District, Kipruto was the eldest child in his family. His family had their own cattle and he often ran uphill to bring them water. He was inspired by the achievements of William Kiplagat, a marathon runner who lived locally, and Kipruto began representing his school in the 10,000 metres. He was academically focused as a child and even though he began to train with Colm O' Connell's group, he did not take up running full-time until he had finished his KCSE examinations. Impressed by his performances at the provincial championships, Kiplagat offered to become Kipruto's coach and mentor. Kipruto travelled to the Netherlands in 2007 to compete professionally for the first time and he won a series of road races.

He made his debut over the marathon distance at the 2008 Reims Marathon, recording a time of 2:08:16 for third place. He began his 2009 season with a fourth-place finish at the Egmond Half Marathon in a time of 1:06:01. He was part of a strong field of runners for the 2009 Paris Marathon and he surprised the race favourites by winning in a course record time of 2:05:47, breaking Michael Rotich's six-year-old record by over 45 seconds. This established him as the thirteenth fastest runner over the distance at the time. After this he won the Giro Podistico Internazionale race in Castelbuono, Italy, dispatching Duncan Kibet among others. He was invited to the Chicago Marathon and managed to finish third, recording 2:06:08 to place behind Abderrahim Goumri and Samuel Wanjiru (who set a new course record).

He opened the 2010 season with a run at the Zayed International Half Marathon and although he set a half marathon best of 1:01:43, he finished out of contention in eleventh place. Running at the Rotterdam Marathon, he again improved his marathon best with a time of 2:05:13 making him the tenth fastest runner over the distance at the time. However, this was only enough for third as rivals Patrick Makau and Geoffrey Mutai both ran under 2:05:00. He returned to the Giro Podistico race in Sicily that year but could not defend his title and finished in third place as Zersenay Tadese went on to win. An appearance at the 2010 Chicago Marathon resulted in a fifth-place finish in a time of 2:09:08, a mark below his best form.

He opened 2011 with a second-place finish at the Discovery Kenya Half Marathon in Eldoret, coming behind Abraham Chebii. He returned to Rotterdam in April and posted a fast time of 2:05:33, taking the runner-up spot behind Wilson Chebet. He stepped down to the shorter distance for the World 10K Bangalore in June and came fifth. He was selected for the Kenyan marathon team at the 2011 World Championships in Athletics. In the race he edged past Feyisa Lilesa in the late stages to take the silver medal and form a Kenyan 1–2 with the defending champion Abel Kirui. In November, he took on Haile Gebrselassie at the Zevenheuvelenloop race and finished second behind the Ethiopian.

Kipruto competed sparingly in 2012, running a best of 60:46 minutes at the Roma-Ostia Half Marathon and entering two marathons: he was 13th at the 2012 London Marathon and managed only ninth at the Hangzhou International Marathon. The following year he returned to action with a runner-up finish at the Egmond Half Marathon (behind Abera Kuma) and won the Lake Biwa Marathon in Japan. He continued his winning streak by finishing first at the Lille Half Marathon in a personal best 60:39 minutes and edging Mark Kiptoo by one second to take the title at the Frankfurt Marathon.

== Achievements ==
Year	Competition	Venue	Position	Event	Notes
Representing Kenya
2008	Reims Marathon	Reims, France	3rd	Marathon	2:08:16
2009	Paris Marathon	Paris, France	1st	Marathon	2:05:47
2009	Chicago Marathon	Chicago, United States	3rd	Marathon	2:06:08
2010	Rotterdam Marathon	Rotterdam, Netherlands	3rd	Marathon	2:05:13
2011	World Championships	Daegu, South Korea	2nd	Marathon	2:10:06
2013	Frankfurt Marathon	Frankfurt, Germany	1st	Marathon	2:06:15

== Personal bests ==
Event	Time (h:m:s)	Venue	Date
20 kilometres	58:50	Chicago, Illinois, United States	11 October 2009
Half marathon	1:00:39	Lille, France	1 September 2013
25 kilometres	1:13:40	Chicago, Illinois, United States	11 October 2009
Marathon	2:05:13	Rotterdam, Netherlands	11 April 2010

- All information taken from IAAF profile.
