= Morocco at the 2013 World Championships in Athletics =

- WA code: MAR
- National federation: Fédération Royale Marocaine d'Athlétisme

in Moscow
- Medals: Gold 0 Silver 0 Bronze 0 Total 0

World Championships in Athletics appearances
- 1983; 1987; 1991; 1993; 1995; 1997; 1999; 2001; 2003; 2005; 2007; 2009; 2011; 2013; 2015; 2017; 2019; 2022; 2023

Morocco competed at the 2013 World Championships in Athletics in Moscow, Russia, from 10–18 August 2013. A team of 21 athletes was announced to represent the country in the event.

== Results ==
(q – qualified, NM – no mark, SB – season best)

=== Men ===
Athlete	Event	Preliminaries		Heats		Semifinals		Final	
Athlete	Event	Time	Rank	Time	Rank	Time	Rank	Time	Rank
Amine El Manaoui	800 metres			1:47.15	23 Q	1:49.08	17	Did not advance	
Samir Jamma	800 metres			1:46.94	20 Q	1:46.53	21	Did not advance	
Abdalaati Iguider	1500 metres			3:38.41	3 Q	3:44.36	21	did not advance	
Zakaria Mazouzi	1500 metres			3:40.76	26 Q	3:45.54	23	did not advance	
Mohamed Moustaoui	1500 metres			3:39.20	16 q	3:36.12	3 Q		
Othmane El Goumri	5000 metres			13:31.08	16			Did not advance	
Aziz Lahbabi	5000 metres			13:37.75	24			Did not advance	
Mohamed Bilal	Marathon							DNF	–
Hafid Chani	Marathon							DNF	–
Jaouad Gharib	Marathon							DNS	–
Jaouad Chemlal	3000 metres steeplechase			8:36.29	32			Did not advance	
Mohammed Boulama	3000 metres steeplechase			DNF	-			Did not advance	
Hamid Ezzine	3000 metres steeplechase			8:24.35	13 q			8:19.53	9

=== Women ===
Athlete	Event	Preliminaries		Heats		Semifinals		Final	
Athlete	Event	Time	Rank	Time	Rank	Time	Rank	Time	Rank
Malika Akkaoui	800 metres			1:59.63	Q	2:02.29	16	did not advance	
Halima Hachlaf	800 metres			2:00.04	Q	2:00.55	6	did not advance	
Rababe Arafi	1500 metres			4:07.84	7 Q	4:09.86	21	Did not advance	
Siham Hilali	1500 metres			4:07.82	8 Q	4:05.32	7 q	4:09.16	11
Btissam Lakhouad	1500 metres			4:09.15	q	DNF	–	Did not advance	
Salima Elouali Alami	3000 metres steeplechase			9:39.95	13 Q			10:08.36	15
Bouaasayriya Kaltoum	3000 metres steeplechase			DQ	-			Did not advance	
Hayat Lambarki	400 metres hurdles			58.00	27	Did not advance			
