= Morocco at the 1983 World Championships in Athletics =

- Flag of Morocco
- WA code: MAR

in Helsinki, Finland August 7–14, 1983
- Competitors: 5 (4 men and 1 woman) in 5 events
- Medals Ranked =21st: Gold 0 Silver 0 Bronze 1 Total 1

World Championships in Athletics appearances
- 1983; 1987; 1991; 1993; 1995; 1997; 1999; 2001; 2003; 2005; 2007; 2009; 2011; 2013; 2015; 2017; 2019; 2022; 2023

Morocco competed at the 1983 World Championships in Athletics in Helsinki, Finland, from August 7 to 14, 1983.

== Medalists ==
Medal	Athlete	Event
Bronze	Saïd Aouita	Men's 1500 metres

== Results ==
=== Men ===
Track and road events

Athlete	Event	Heat		Semifinal		Final	
Athlete	Event	Result	Rank	Result	Rank	Result	Rank
Faouzi Lahbi	800 metres	1:47.76	21	Did not advance			
Mohamed Zahafi	800 metres	1:49.43	39	Did not advance			
Saïd Aouita	1500 metres	3:40.39	9 Q	3:36.43	6 Q	3:42.02	3rd place, bronze medalist(s)
Hamid Homada	3000 metres steeplechase	8:34.59	27	—		Did not advance	

=== Women ===
Track and road events

Athlete	Event	Heat		Quarterfinals		Semifinal		Final	
Athlete	Event	Result	Rank	Result	Rank	Result	Rank	Result	Rank
Nawal El Moutawakel	100 metres hurdles	14.85	33	Did not advance					
Nawal El Moutawakel	400 metres hurdles	56.52	5 Q	—		57.10	12	Did not advance	
