= Abderrahime Bouramdane =

Moroccan long-distance runner

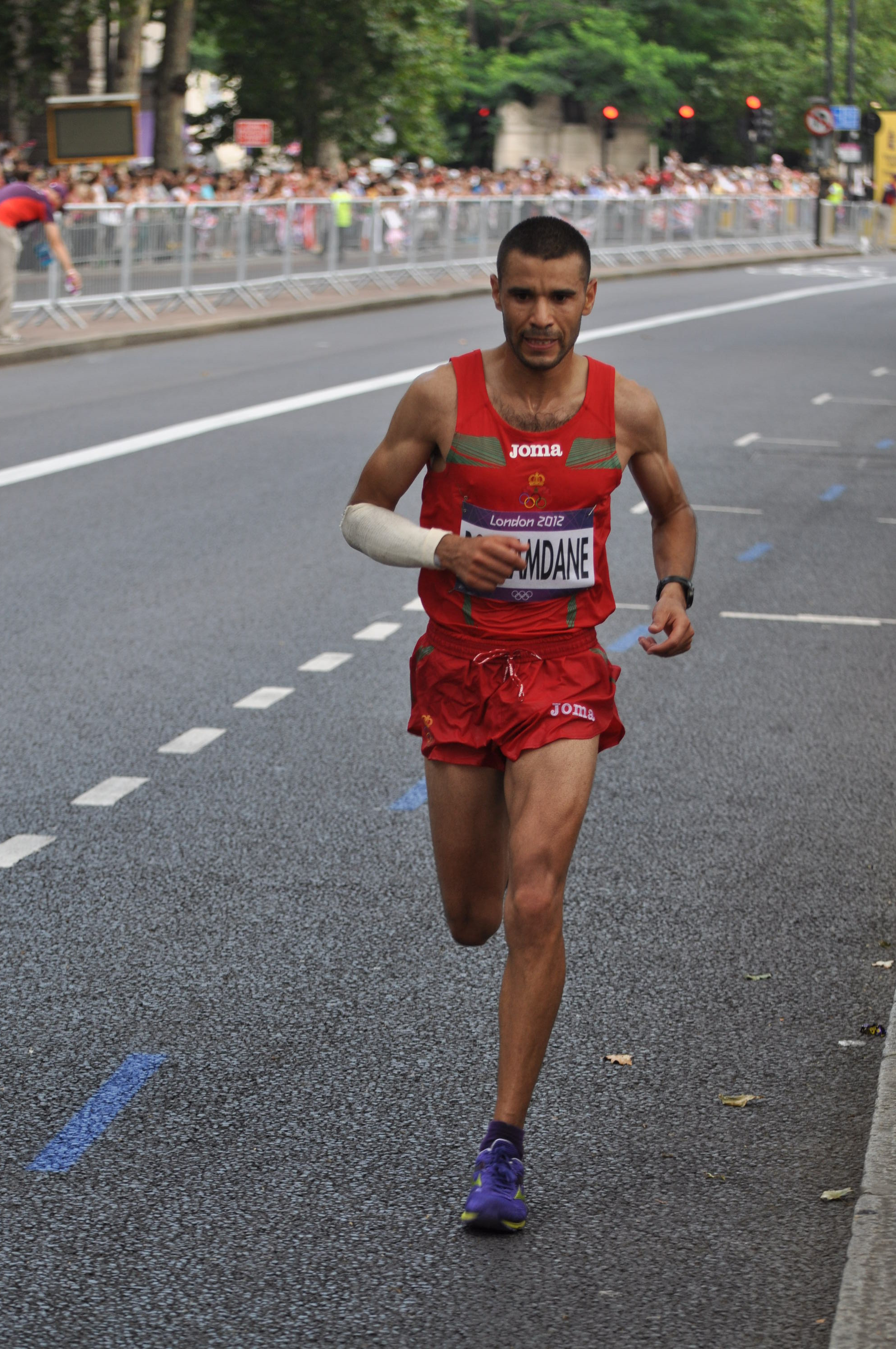
- Bouramdane in the marathon at the 2012 Olympics in London

Personal information
- Born: 23 June 1978 (age 48)
- Height: 1.7 m (5 ft 7 in)
- Weight: 58 kg (128 lb)

Sport
- Country: Morocco
- Sport: Athletics
- Event: Marathon
Medal record
Jeux de la Francophonie
Bronze medal – third place	2005 Niamey	Marathon

Abderrahime Bouramdane (born 23 June 1978) is a Moroccan long-distance runner who competes in marathons. He represented Morocco at the 2008 Beijing Olympics and 2011 World Championships in Daegu, South Korea. After winning his first two marathons in Tunis and Marrakesh, Bouramdane represented his country at the World Championships in Athletics in 2005 and 2007.

He won his first international medal at the 2005 Jeux de la Francophonie, taking the marathon bronze. He won the 2006 National Capital Marathon and had a series of second-place finishes, which included runner-up spots at the JoongAng Seoul Marathon and 2008 Boston Marathon. He placed in the top five at the New York City Marathon in 2008 and 2009. His personal best of 2:07:33 hours was set at the 2010 London Marathon. This time ranks him as the fifth fastest Moroccan over the marathon distance.

== Career ==
He grew up in Fes and, inspired by the exploits of Olympic marathon medalist Rhadi Ben Abdesselam, he took up running in 1993. He won his first two top level marathon races, breaking the course record to win the 2004 Tunis Marathon in a time of 2:15:38 hours, and then improving to 2:15:16 to win the Marrakesh Marathon. He gained selection for the 2005 World Championships in Athletics in Helsinki, but he did not manage to finish the race, dropping out after the 35 km. He formed part of a Moroccan medal sweep of the marathon 2005 Jeux de la Francophonie, taking the bronze medal behind Zaïd Laaroussi and Rachid Kisri.

He ran at Ottawa's National Capital Marathon in May 2006 and set a personal best of 2:12:18 hours. He was not the first to cross the line, but a large group of runners had inadvertently taken a shorter route mid-race and, as the first runner to complete the full course, Bouramdane was declared the winner while nearly a dozen athletes were disqualified. His second run of the year was also in Canada: at the Toronto Waterfront Marathon he and Daniel Rono quickly became the two race protagonists. Strong winds put an end to their challenge to the Canadian all-comers record, but Bouramdane improved his best to 2:10:41 hours as the clear runner-up by a margin of over three minutes.

He knocked a second off this time at the 2007 Ottawa race but was again second placed behind a Kenyan runner, this time David Cheruiyot. Another national selection saw him take 45th place at the 2007 World Championships in Athletics, one place behind team mate Kisri, but the premature exits of three other Moroccans meant the country did not rank in the World Marathon Cup competition. The JoongAng Seoul Marathon in November saw Bouramdane duel against Samuel Chelanga for the title and although his rival won the competition, the Moroccan dipped under two hours and ten minutes for the first time for a best of 2:08:20 hours.

The 2008 Boston Marathon saw him take his fourth consecutive runner-up spot on the road circuit behind a Kenyan elite runner, as he recorded his second sub-2:10 time behind Robert Cheruiyot. His Olympic debut followed in August at the 2008 Beijing Olympics, coming 26th overall. His final big race of the year came at the New York City Marathon, where he was fifth.

He failed to finish the Lake Biwa Marathon in February 2009, and turned shorter races instead, placing in the top ten at the Nordion 10km in Ottawa. Having missed out on selection for the 2009 World Championships, he returned to the New York Marathon later that year and took fifth place for a second year running. A personal best came at the 2010 London Marathon, where he finished in 2:07:33 hours to take fourth place. He went on to race in the BUPA Great North Run in September 2010 and finished with another personal best, this time in the half marathon, of 1:02:40. He was somewhat slower at the 2010 New York City Marathon, however, but finished within the top ten.

He opened 2011 with a run at the Lisbon Half Marathon, finishing 1:03:47 for the distance and ninth overall. He had the third fastest run of his career at the 2011 London Marathon as he took seventh position in a time of 2:08:42 hours, finishing just behind fellow Moroccan Jaouad Gharib. He qualified for the 2012 Summer Olympics, but did not finish the race.

He was banned from competition for two years for irregularities in his biological passport, with the ban ending on 1 December 2017. In addition, all his results from 14 April 2011 until the end of the sanction were annulled.

== Statistics ==
=== International competition ===
Year	Competition	Venue	Position	Notes
2005	Jeux de la Francophonie	Niamey, Niger	3rd	Marathon
2005	World Championships	Helsinki, Finland	DNF	Marathon
2007	World Championships	Osaka, Japan	45th	Marathon
2008	Olympic Games	Beijing, China	26th	Marathon
2011	World Championships	Daegu, South Korea	DQ	Marathon

=== Personal bests ===
- Half marathon – 1:03:47 hrs (2011) 1:02:40 hrs downhill (2010)
- Marathon – 2:07:33 hrs (2010)
