= Morocco at the 2023 World Athletics Championships =

- Flag of Morocco
- WA code: MAR

in Budapest, Hungary 19 August 2023 – 27 August 2023
- Competitors: 18 (13 men and 5 women)
- Medals Ranked 15th: Gold 1 Silver 0 Bronze 1 Total 2

World Athletics Championships appearances
- 1983; 1987; 1991; 1993; 1995; 1997; 1999; 2001; 2003; 2005; 2007; 2009; 2011; 2013; 2015; 2017; 2019; 2022; 2023

Morocco competed at the 2023 World Athletics Championships in Budapest, Hungary, from 19 to 27 August 2023.

== Medalists ==
Medal	Athlete	Event	Date
Gold	Soufiane El Bakkali	Men's 3000 metres steeplechase	22 August
Bronze	Fatima Ezzahra Gardadi	Women's marathon	26 August

== Results ==
Morocco entered 18 athletes.

Key

- Q = Qualified for the next round
- q = Qualified for the next round as a fastest loser or, in field events, by position without achieving the qualifying target
- NR = National record
- PB = Personal best
- SB = Season best
- N/A = Round not applicable for the event

=== Men ===
Track and road events

Athlete	Event	Heat		Semifinal		Final	
Athlete	Event	Result	Rank	Result	Rank	Result	Rank
Abdelati El Guesse	800 metres	1:45.24	1 Q	1:44.55	7	Did not advance	
Oussama Nabil	800 metres	1:47.79	7	Did not advance			
Hicham Akankam	1500 metres	3:47.45	9	Did not advance			
Anass Essayi	1500 metres	3:35.63	10	Did not advance			
Abdellatif Sadiki	1500 metres	3:37.19	9	Did not advance			
Mohamed Reda El Aaraby	Marathon	—				2:13:55 SB	25
Mustapha Houdadi	Marathon	—				2:14:30	27
Hamza Sahli	Marathon	—				DNF	
Salaheddine Ben Yazide	3000 metres steeplechase	8:38.14	10	—		Did not advance	
Soufiane El Bakkali	3000 metres steeplechase	8:23.66	2 Q	—		8:03.53	1st place, gold medalist(s)
Mohammed Msaad	3000 metres steeplechase	8:22.95	9	—		Did not advance	
Mohamed Tindouft	3000 metres steeplechase	8:20.67	6	—		Did not advance	

=== Women ===
Track and road events

Athlete	Event	Heat		Semifinal		Final	
Athlete	Event	Result	Rank	Result	Rank	Result	Rank
Assia Raziki	800 metres	2:00.91 PB	5	Did not advance			
Rkia El Moukim	Marathon	—				2:33:54	25
Fatima Ezzahra Gardadi	Marathon	—				2:25:17	3rd place, bronze medalist(s)
Noura Ennadi	400 metres hurdles	55.21	5 q	55.15	6	Did not advance	
