= Eliud Kiptanui =

Kenyan long-distance runner (born 1989)

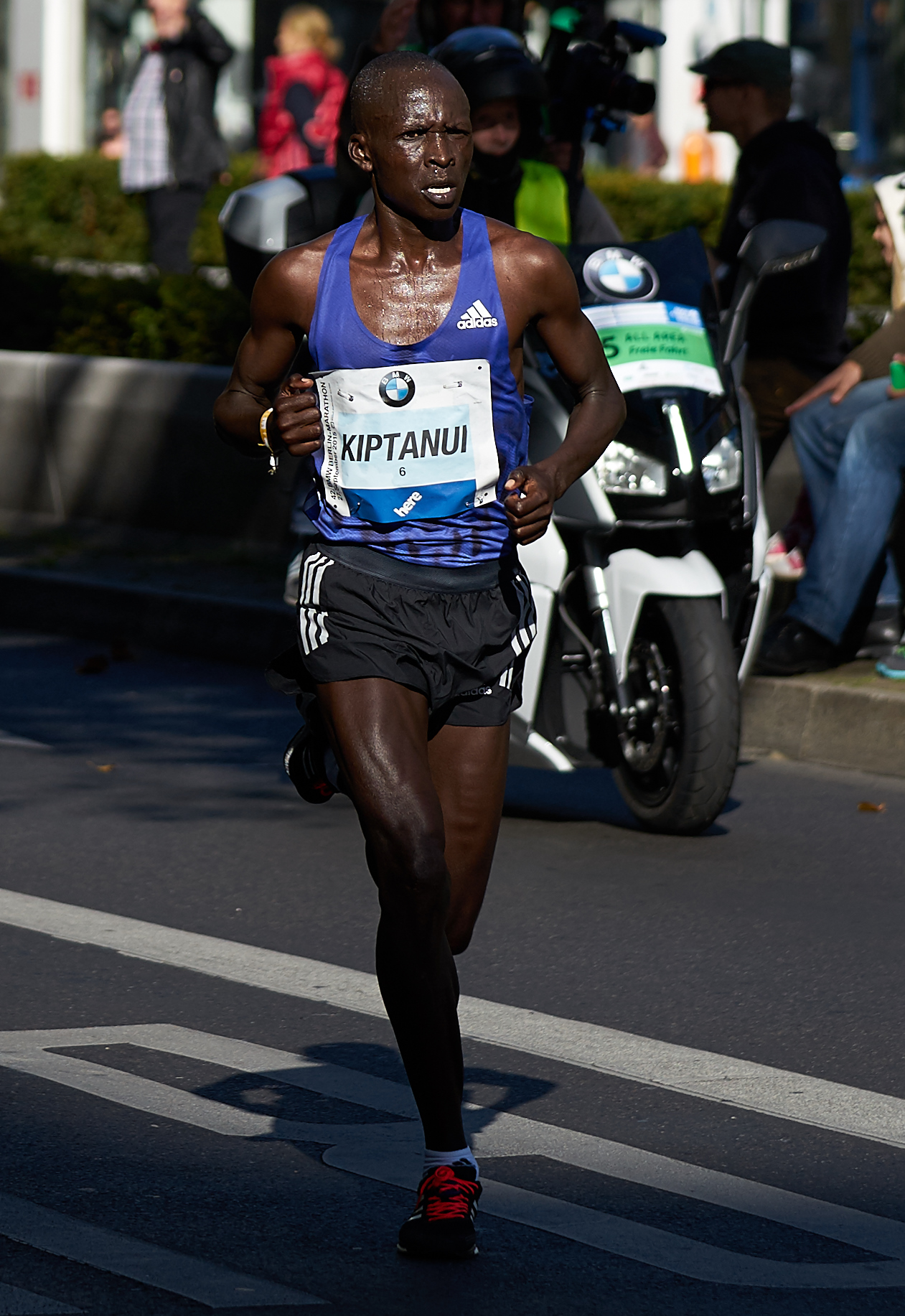
Kiptanui at the Berlin Marathon 2015

Eliud Kiptanui (born 6 June 1989) is a Kenyan long distance runner who specialises in the marathon. He won the 2010 Prague International Marathon and has a personal best of 2:05:21 hours. He represented his country at the 2011 World Championships in Athletics.

== Biography ==
Kiptanui was born and raised in Kaplelach, Uasin Gishu District. He was the first child in a family of six and, like many Kenyans, he studied up to secondary school level.

Kiptanui began to take running seriously after leaving school at 16, using the prize money to help pay for his sibling's education. He was encouraged by his performance in a 15 km race in Kenya in 2008, noting that although he finished in ninth place, all those who finished ahead of him were elite runners.

Kiptanui travelled to Norway in July 2009 to compete in the 3000 metres at the Bislett Games, where he finished in fifth position. However, it was a performance in his native Kenya which attracted the attention of athletics manager Volker Wagner. Kiptanui won the Safaricom Marathon in Kisumu in December of that year with a time of 2:12:17 hours, outrunning the second-place finisher by a margin of over seven minutes.

Kiptanui intended to make his European marathon debut at the Vienna Marathon in April 2010, but his travel schedule was disrupted by the Eyjafjallajökull eruption and he instead settled for the Prague Marathon three weeks later as an alternative. He methodically paced himself in the race, first overtaking Denis Ndiso and then the race favourite Yemane Tsegay. Kiptanui completed the second half of the race faster than the first and was rewarded with a new personal best time and course record of 2:05:39, raising him into the top twenty fastest ever marathon runners in only his second race over the distance. This was in spite of the fact that the Prague course is not a fast one, as it covers several kilometres of cobblestones. Kiptanui pledged to use the US$75,000 prize money to help his brothers and sisters attend school in Kenya. He was touted as a possible winner at the 2010 Berlin Marathon, but he ended the race in fifth place with a time of 2:08:05 while compatriot Patrick Makau took the honours.

His first race of 2011 was the Rotterdam Marathon and came fifth, some minutes off the winner Wilson Chebet. He was chosen to compete for Kenya at the 2011 World Championships in Athletics. He was among the leaders at the 25 km mark, but gradually fell behind after 30 km and finished the race in sixth place. He ran the second best time of his career at the 2012 Seoul International Marathon, taking third place in a Kenyan podium sweep with a time of 2:06:44 hours. In his two other outings that year he came eighth at the 2012 Berlin Marathon then second at the Beijing Marathon.

== Achievements ==
- All results regarding marathon, unless stated otherwise

Year	Competition	Venue	Position	Notes
Representing Kenya
2010	Prague Marathon	Prague, Czech Republic	1st	2:05:39
2011	World Championships	Daegu, South Korea	6th	Marathon
