= Hiroyuki Horibata =

Japanese long-distance runner

Hiroyuki Horibata (Japanese: 堀端 宏行; born 28 October 1986) is a Japanese long-distance runner who competes in the marathon. He holds a personal best of 2:08:24 hours for the event, set in 2012. He twice represented his country at the World Championships in Athletics, placing seventh in 2011 but failing to finish in 2013.

He won his first half marathon in 2007 at the Kanaguri Hai Tamana Half Marathon. His marathon debut followed at the 2008 Tokyo International Marathon, where he was ninth with a time of 2:11:47 hours. He returned the following year but after a slow run of 2:18:27 he switched to track running for a period.

He had renewed success over the longer distance at the 2011 Lake Biwa Marathon and he took third in a time of 2:09:25 hours – the first Japanese finisher behind East Africans Wilson Kipsang Kiprotich and Deriba Merga. This brought him his first national selection. A run of 2:10:05 hours for eleventh at the 2012 Lake Biwa Marathon was not enough for Olympic selection, but he finished the year with his first national title in the marathon through a personal best run of 2:08:24 hours at the Fukuoka Marathon. Only Kenya's Joseph Gitau was faster at the race.

His 2012 national title win earned him a place at the 2013 World Championships in Athletics, but he had competed sparingly and failed to finish the distance. He competed in the Grand Tour Kyushu ekiden later that year, but largely missed the 2014 and 2015 seasons.

== Personal bests ==
- 5000 metres – 13:53.07 min (2011)
- 10,000 metres – 28:30.32 min (2011)
- Half marathon – 64:11 min (2007)
- Marathon – 2:08:24 (2012)

== International competitions ==
Year	Competition	Venue	Position	Event	Notes
2011	World Championships	Daegu, South Korea	7th	Marathon	2:11:52
2011	World Marathon Cup	Daegu, South Korea	2nd	Team marathon	6:41:13
2013	World Championships	Moscow, Russia	—	Marathon	DNF

== National titles ==
- Japan Championships in Athletics
  - Marathon: 2012
