= Soufiyan Bouqantar =

Moroccan long-distance runner

- Bouqantar in 2012

Medal record

Men's Athletics

Representing Morocco

Mediterranean Games
Bronze medal – third place	2013 Mersin	10,000 m

Soufiyan Bouqantar (also spelled Soufiane, born 30 August 1993) is a Moroccan long-distance runner. At the 2012 Summer Olympics, he competed in the Men's 5000 metres, but failed to qualify for the final, finishing 32nd overall in Round 1. At the 2013 Mediterranean Games, Bouqanter won a bronze medal in the Men's 10000 metres.

At the 2020 Summer Olympics, he competed in the men's 5,000 metres event.
