= Rachid Kisri =

Moroccan long-distance runner

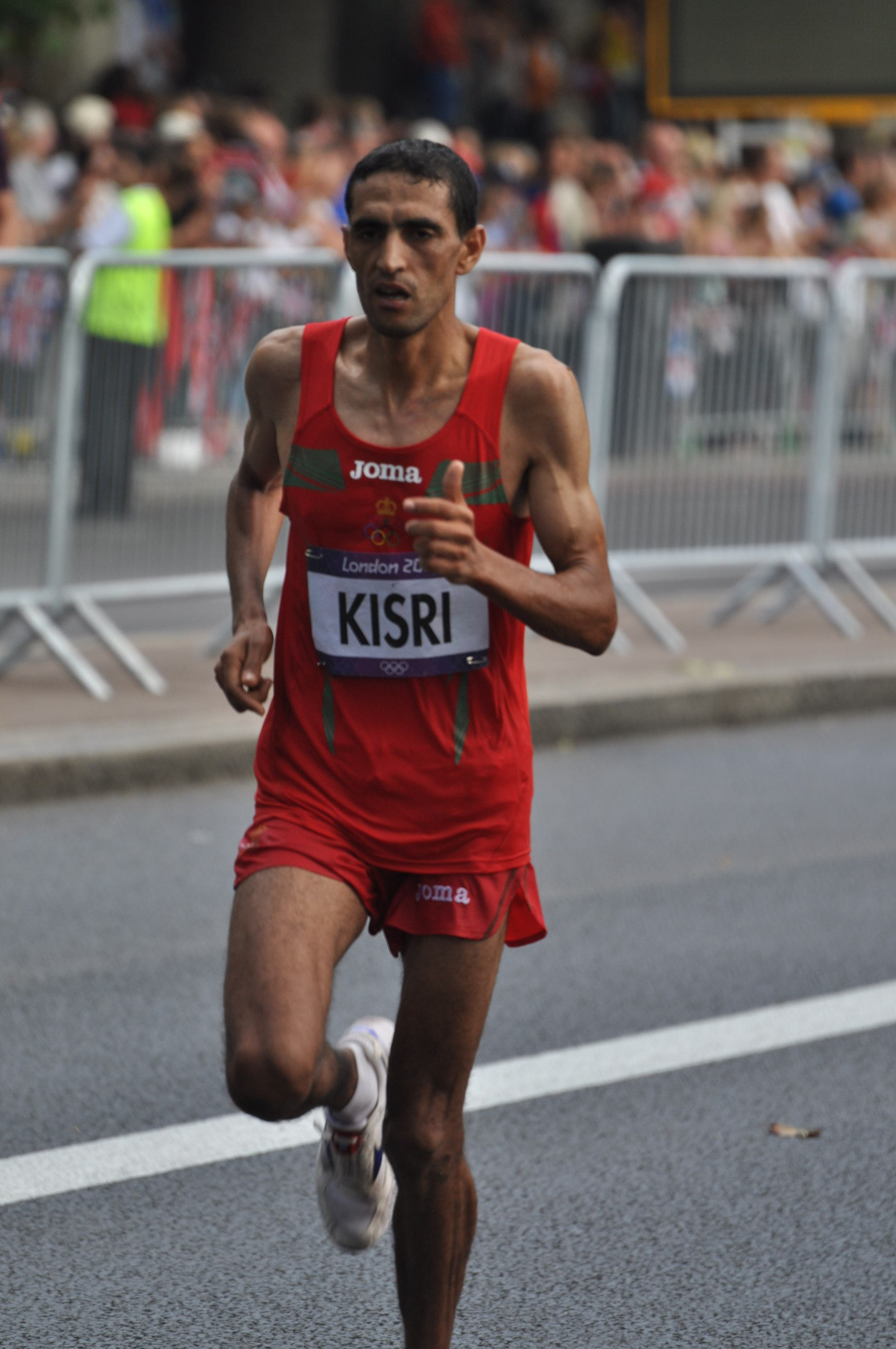
- Kisri in the marathon at the 2012 Olympics

Personal information
- Born: 2 August 1975 (age 51)
- Height: 1.79 m (5 ft 10 in)
- Weight: 60 kg (132 lb)

Sport
- Country: Morocco
- Sport: Athletics
- Event: Marathon

Rachid Kisri (born 1 March 1975) is a Moroccan long-distance runner. At the 2012 Summer Olympics, he competed in the Men's marathon, finishing in 18th place.
