= Dadi Yami =

Ethiopian marathon runner

Personal information
- Nationality: Ethiopian
- Born: 1982 (age 42–43) Ethiopia

Sport
- Sport: Long-distance running
- Event: Marathon

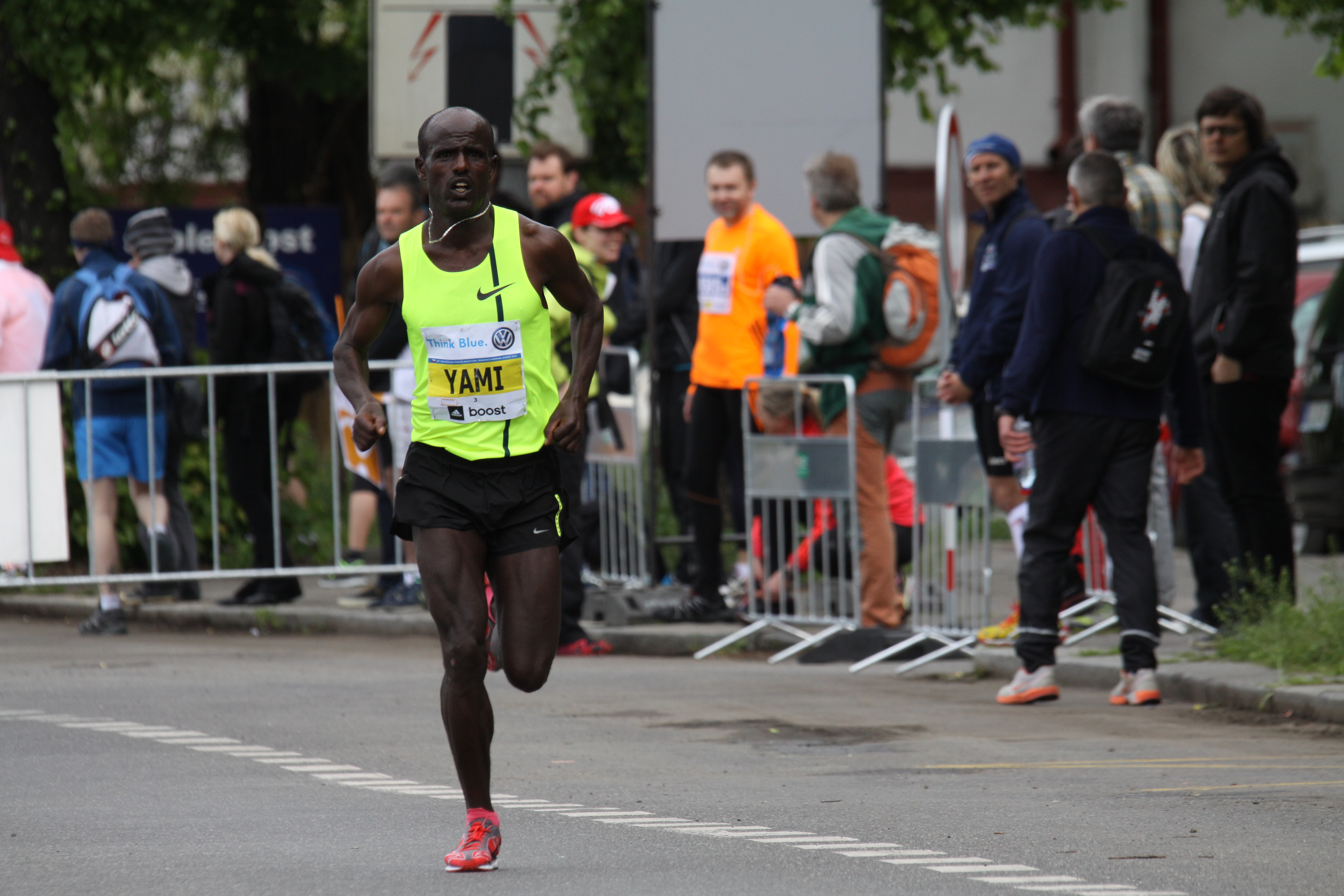
Dadi Yami during Prague International Marathon in 2014

Dadi Yami Gemeda (born 1982) is an Ethiopian long-distance runner who competes in the marathon. His personal best for the distance is 2:05:41 hours.

Born and raised in the rural areas to the north of Addis Ababa, Dadi's birth date is unknown due to poor record keeping and is estimated to be in 1982. He began working with athletics manager Jos Hermens and began training for the marathon with his group. He made his debut over the distance at the 2011 Eindhoven Marathon and managed ninth place with a time of 2:11:04 hours. The 2012 Dubai Marathon saw him make a significant breakthrough with a run of 2:05:41 hours. In the extremely fast race, this was only enough for sixth place, but still ranked him in the top twenty in the world that year and in the top forty on the all-time lists.

In his next outing at the Hamburg Marathon he was a little slower with a run of 2:07:01 hours, but the field was much slower than the record-breaking Dubai race and he was the runner-up behind Shami Abdulahi. Returning to his homeland, he ran at and won the Abebe Bikila Marathon. Showing his sudden entrance into the elite ranks, he was invited to the 2012 Chicago Marathon and he came eighth. He returned to Dubai in 2013 but was not in contention in the fast race, ending up seventh with a time of 2:07:55 hours. His victory in the Warsaw Marathon in Poland took place in 2019 with a time of 2:11:39.
