= Simon Mrashani =

Tanzanian marathon runner

Medal record

Representing Tanzania

Men's athletics

Commonwealth Games
Silver medal – second place	Kuala Lumpur, Malaysia 1998	Marathon

African Games
Bronze medal – third place	Harare, Zimbabwe 1995	Marathon

Simon Mrashani Basiligitwa (born 18 April 1964) is a Tanzanian marathon runner.

He won the silver medal at the 1998 Commonwealth Games held in Kuala Lumpur in a time of 2:19:42 hours. He set his PR of 2:11:34 in 1991 in Japan, and was subsequently named to the national World Championship team in the same year. The next year he finished second in the Hamburg Marathon in Germany, just behind fellow-Tanzanian marathoner Julius Sumaye. His younger sister Banuelia Mrashani also ran the marathon at an elite level internationally.

== Achievements ==
- All results regarding marathon, unless stated otherwise

Year	Competition	Venue	Position	Notes
Representing Tanzania
1991	Lake Biwa Marathon	Ōtsu, Japan	1st	2:11:34
1991	World Championships	Tokyo, Japan	—	DNF
1992	Hamburg Marathon	Hamburg, Germany	2nd	2:15:45
1994	Mars Duna Marathon	Visegrád, Hungary	1st	2:17:38
1995	Antwerp Marathon	Antwerp, Belgium	3rd	2:16:08
1996	Prague Marathon	Prague, Czech Republic	6th	2:16:00
1998	Vienna Marathon	Vienna, Austria	6th	2:13:19
2000	Fukuoka Marathon	Fukuoka, Japan	16th	2:18:51
