= 2013 Chicago Marathon =

Footrace held in Chicago, Illinois

36th Chicago Marathon
- Venue: Chicago, United States
- Dates: October 13, 2013

Champions
- Men: Dennis Kipruto Kimetto (2:03:45)
- Women: Rita Jeptoo (2:19:57)

The 2013 Chicago Marathon was the 36th edition of the Chicago Marathon, held each year in Chicago, Illinois, and took place on Sunday, October 13. The elite races were won by Kenyan athletes Dennis Kipruto Kimetto (2:03:45) and Rita Jeptoo (2:19:57).

It had 39,122 finishers, (21,618 male, 17,504 female), and an average finishing time of 4:32:23.

== Results ==
=== Men ===
Place	Athlete	Nationality	Time
1	Dennis Kimetto	Kenya	2:03:45
2	Emmanuel Kipchirchir Mutai	Kenya	2:03:52
3	Sammy Kitwara	Kenya	2:05:16
4	Micah Kogo	Kenya	2:06:56
5	Dathan Ritzenhein	United States	2:09:45
6	Ayele Abshero	Ethiopia	2:10:10
7	Hiroaki Sano	Japan	2:10:29
8	Moses Mosop	Kenya	2:11:19
9	Yoshinori Oda	Japan	2:11:29
10	Matt Tegenkamp	United States	2:12:28

=== Women ===
Place	Athlete	Nationality	Time
1	Rita Jeptoo	Kenya	2:19:57
2	Jemima Jelagat Sumgong	Kenya	2:20:48
3	Mariya Konovalova	Russia	2:22:46
4	Aliaksandra Duliba	Belarus	2:23:44
5	Atsede Baysa	Ethiopia	2:26:42
6	Ehitu Kiros Reda	Ethiopia	2:27:42
7	Yukiko Akaba	Japan	2:27:49
8	Abebech Afework	Ethiopia	2:28:38
9	Clara Santucci	United States	2:31:39
10	Melissa White	United States	2:32:37
