= Kaye Anne Starosciak =

American long-distance runner

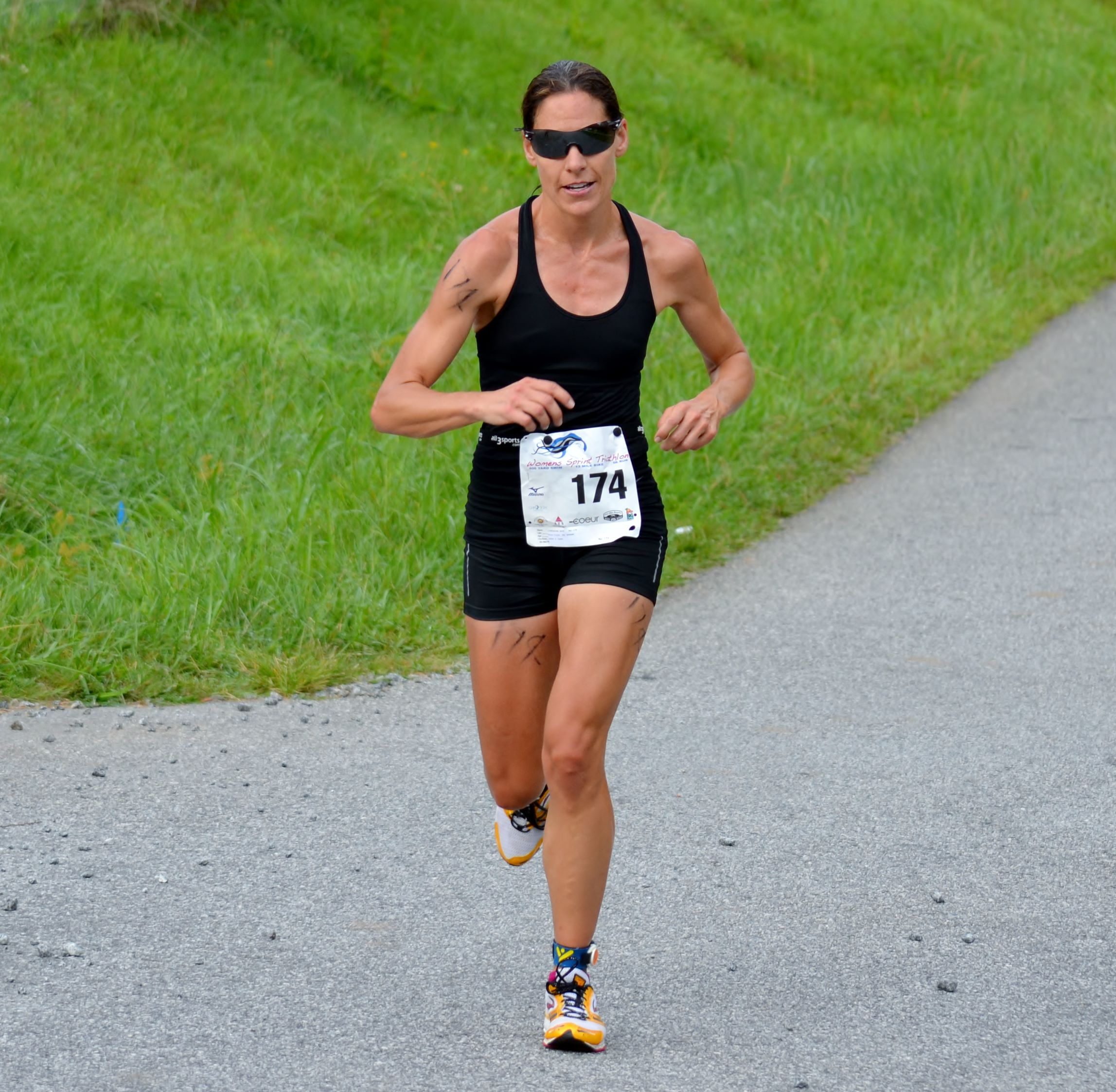
At the Acworth Women's Triathlon

Kaye Anne Starosciak (born Kaye Anne Pappas on April 23, 1973) is an American long-distance runner.

She is regarded as one of the top Masters runners in the United States, competing in the Elite Female Division (Top 50) of the 2014 Boston Marathon and finishing 7th Overall for Female Masters. Starosciak has won full and half marathons as well as shorter distance races and trail competitions.

Starosciak competed in the 2013 Boston Marathon, finishing approximately one hour before the bombings that forced the race to be stopped.

== Career highlights ==
- 7th, Female Masters Division, 2014 Boston Marathon
- Winner, Female Overall Division, 2015 Publix Georgia Marathon
- Winner, Female Overall Division, 2017 Chickamauga Battlefield Marathon
- Winner, Female Overall Division, 2011 Chickamauga Battlefield Marathon
- Winner, Female Overall Division, 2010 Chickamauga Battlefield Marathon
- Winner, Female Overall Division, 2011 Berry Half Marathon
- Winner, Female Overall Division, 2012 Downhill at Dawn Half Marathon
- Winner, Female Overall Division, 2011 Charlevoix Half Marathon
- Winner, Female Overall Division, 2014 Red Top Rumble Trail Race
- Winner, Female Overall Division, 2013 Red Top Rumble Trail Race
- Winner, Female Masters Division, 2019 Chickamauga Battlefield Marathon
- Winner, Female Masters Division, 2019 Publix Georgia Half Marathon
- Winner, Female Masters Division, 2016 Publix Georgia Marathon
- Winner, Female Masters Division, 2013 Rocket City Marathon
- 4th, Female Masters Division, 2014 Detroit Marathon
- 3rd, Female Overall Division, 2013 Detroit Half Marathon
- Winner, Female Division, Georgia Games Run for Life 5K, 2011
