= Duliba =

Duliba is a surname. Notable people with the surname include:

- Bob Duliba (1935–2026), American baseball player
- Oleksandra Shafar née Duliba, (born 1988), Belarusian long-distance runner
