= Jeptoo =

Jeptoo is a surname of Kenyan origin. Notable people with the surname include:

- Priscah Jeptoo (born 1984), Kenyan runner and 2011 World Championships marathon medallist
- Rita Jeptoo (born 1981), Kenyan runner and 2006 Boston Marathon winner
