= Tiruye Mesfin =

Ethiopian long-distance runner

Personal information
- Full name: Tiruye Mesfin
- Nationality: Ethiopian
- Born: 11 September 2002 (age 23)

Sport
- Sport: Athletics
- Events: Long-distance running (10K, Half marathon, Marathon)

Tiruye Mesfin (born 11 September 2002) is an Ethiopian long-distance runner who competes in road races, particularly the half marathon and marathon. She has been an active participant in long-distance running events since 2022.

Mesfin is currently serving a three-year ban set to expire in August 2029 for an anti-doping rule violation.

== Career ==
In 2022, Mesfin set a personal best of 31:23 in the 10K road race. Later that year, she made her marathon debut at the Valencia Marathon, finishing sixth in 2:18:47.

In 2023, she recorded a half marathon personal best of 1:06:31 at the Lisbon Half Marathon, where she finished fourth. She went on to place second at the Hamburg Marathon in 2:20:18, leading much of the race before being overtaken late by Kenyan runner Dorcas Tuitoek. She capped the year with a fifth-place finish at the Amsterdam Marathon, clocking 2:22:05.

In 2024, Mesfin placed ninth at the Boston Marathon in 2:24:58. She later returned to Valencia, where she improved her personal best to 2:18:35, finishing third. She also placed third at the Vedanta Delhi Half Marathon, finishing in 1:09:42.

In February 2025, Mesfin won the senior women’s title at the Jan Meda International Cross Country Championships in Addis Ababa, Ethiopia’s premier national cross country meet. She continued her form at the 2025 Rotterdam Marathon, finishing fourth in 2:22:27. She later placed third in the Shanghai Marathon that year with a time of 2:20:38.

In August 2026, Mesfin was issued with a three-year ban by the Athletics Integrity Unit for an anti-doping rule violation due to abnormalities detected in her Athlete biological passport.

== Personal bests ==
As of June 2025:

- 10K Road – 31:23 (2022)
- Half Marathon – 1:06:31 (Lisbon, 2023)
- Marathon – 2:18:35 (Valencia, 2024)
