= 2012 Chicago Marathon =

Footrace held in Chicago, Illinois

35th Chicago Marathon
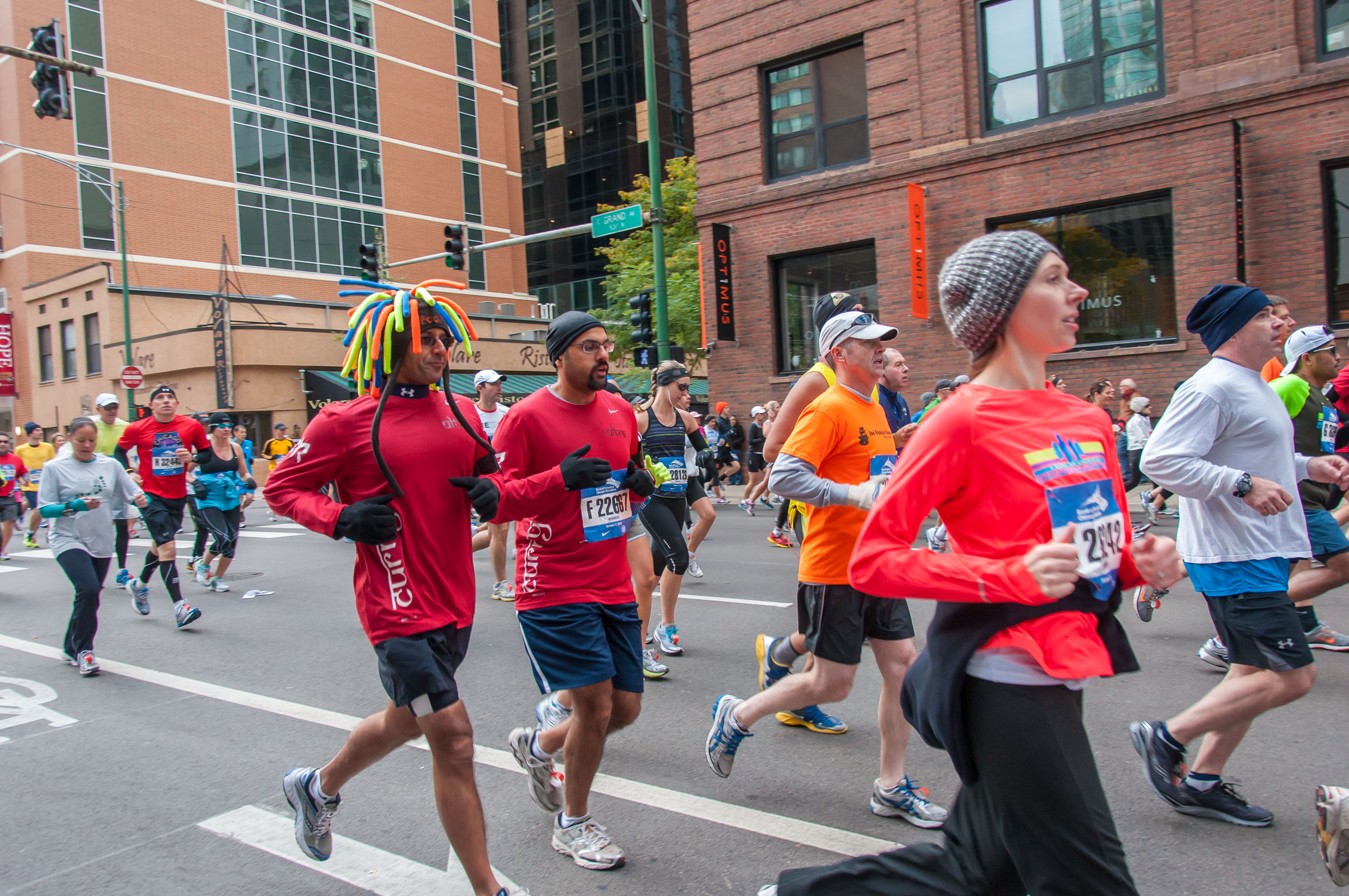
- Fun runners at the 2012 race
- Venue: Chicago, United States
- Dates: October 7

Champions
- Men: Tsegaye Kebede (2:04:38 CR)
- Women: Atsede Baysa (2:22:03)

The 2012 Chicago Marathon was the 35th edition of the annual marathon race in Chicago, Illinois and was held on Sunday, October 7. An IAAF Gold Label Road Race, it was the fourth and final World Marathon Majors event to be held that year. Tsegaye Kebede won the men's race in a course record of 2:04:38 hours and Atsede Baysa was the women's winner in a personal best of 2:22:03. A total of 37455 runners finished the race (20688 men, 16767 women).

== Summary ==
The focus of the women's race was Liliya Shobukhova, who had won the race three times consecutively but had dropped out of the Olympic marathon. Kenya's Lucy Wangui Kabuu was the second-fastest entrant with a best of 2:19:34 hours. Other prominent entrants included Ethiopians Atsede Baysa and Merima Mohammed. Tsegaye Kebede and Wesley Korir, runners-up in 2010 and 2011 respectively, were the principal contenders for the men's race.

Demonstrating the depth of the field, the men's race had thirteen runners in the pack by the halfway point (timing 1:02:54) – all of them Kenyan or Ethiopian. By the time the two pacemakers (Shadrack Kosgei and Merkabu Birke) had dropped out around the 30 km mark, Tsegaye had assumed the head of the pack. Laban Korir and Michael Kipyego had fallen away at that point. Tsegaye accelerated and a succession of four sub-4:40 miles reduced the lead pack to himself, Tilahun Regassa, Sammy Kitwara and Feyisa Lilesa. Wesley Korir was twenty seconds behind after 35 km. With one mile left, only Feyisa remained alongside Tsegaye, but the latter steadily pulled away in the final section of the race to win by a margin of fourteen seconds with a course record 2:04:38 hours. Feyisa took the runner-up spot and Tilahun completed the podium half a minute later. Kitwara and Wesley Korir were next to finish. Dathan Ritzenhein closed his race quickly to place ninth, the first non-East African to finish, with a personal record 2:07:47.

The women's race also had a number of contenders left as the race reached the half marathon mark in 1:11:15 hours, with two Russians, three Kenyans and four Ethiopians in the pack of nine. Kabuu seized the lead after this point and by 30 km she had divided the pack in two, with Fatuma Sado, Caroline Rotich and Rita Jeptoo all five seconds ahead of Atsede, Shobukhova and Werknesh Kidane. Merima Mohammed was the first prominent race drop-out. Over the next 5 km Fatuma faded away and Atsede had pushed her way back to the front. Rotich soon fell behind and the final mile stretch became a hotly contested duel between Atsede and Jeptoo. Atsede was the one to reach the line first by a very narrow margin – 2:22:03 to Jeptoo's 2:22:04. Kabuu took third while Shobukhova finished quickly for fourth place. Renee Metivier Baillie was the first American home in a personal record run of 2:27:17 for eighth.

The men's wheelchair race was won by Josh Cassidy and Tatyana McFadden defended her women's title.

== Results ==
=== Elite men ===
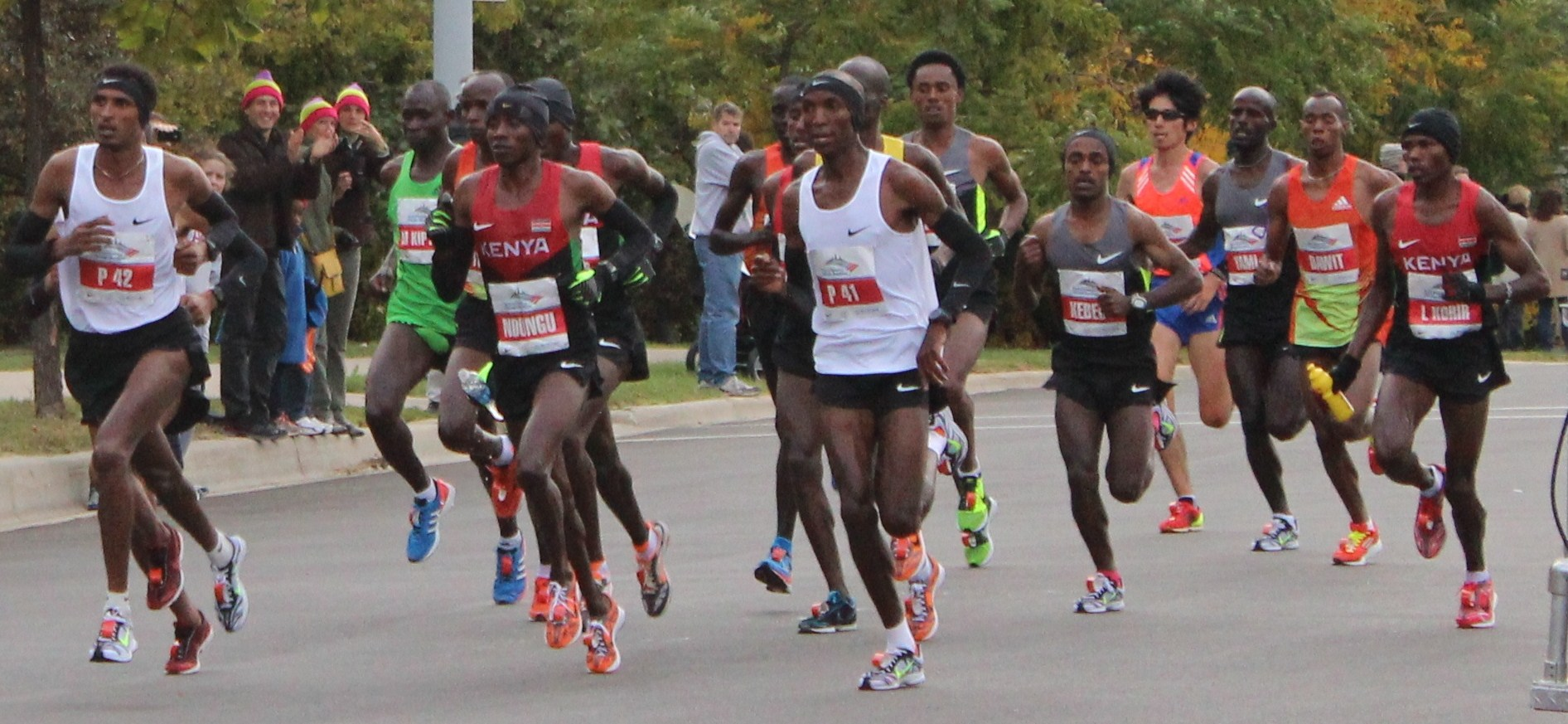
The large leading pack of elite men at mile six

Position	Athlete	Nationality	Time
Gold medal	Tsegaye Kebede	Ethiopia	2:04:38 CR/PB
Silver medal	Feyisa Lilesa	Ethiopia	2:04:52 PB
Bronze medal	Tilahun Regassa	Ethiopia	2:05:27 PB
4	Sammy Kitwara	Kenya	2:05:54 PB
5	Wesley Korir	Kenya	2:06:13 PB
6	Bernard Kipyego	Kenya	2:06:40
7	Samuel Ndungu	Kenya	2:07:26
8	Dadi Yami	Ethiopia	2:07:43
9	Dathan Ritzenhein	United States	2:07:47 PB
10	Shami Abdulahi	Ethiopia	2:08:39

=== Elite women ===
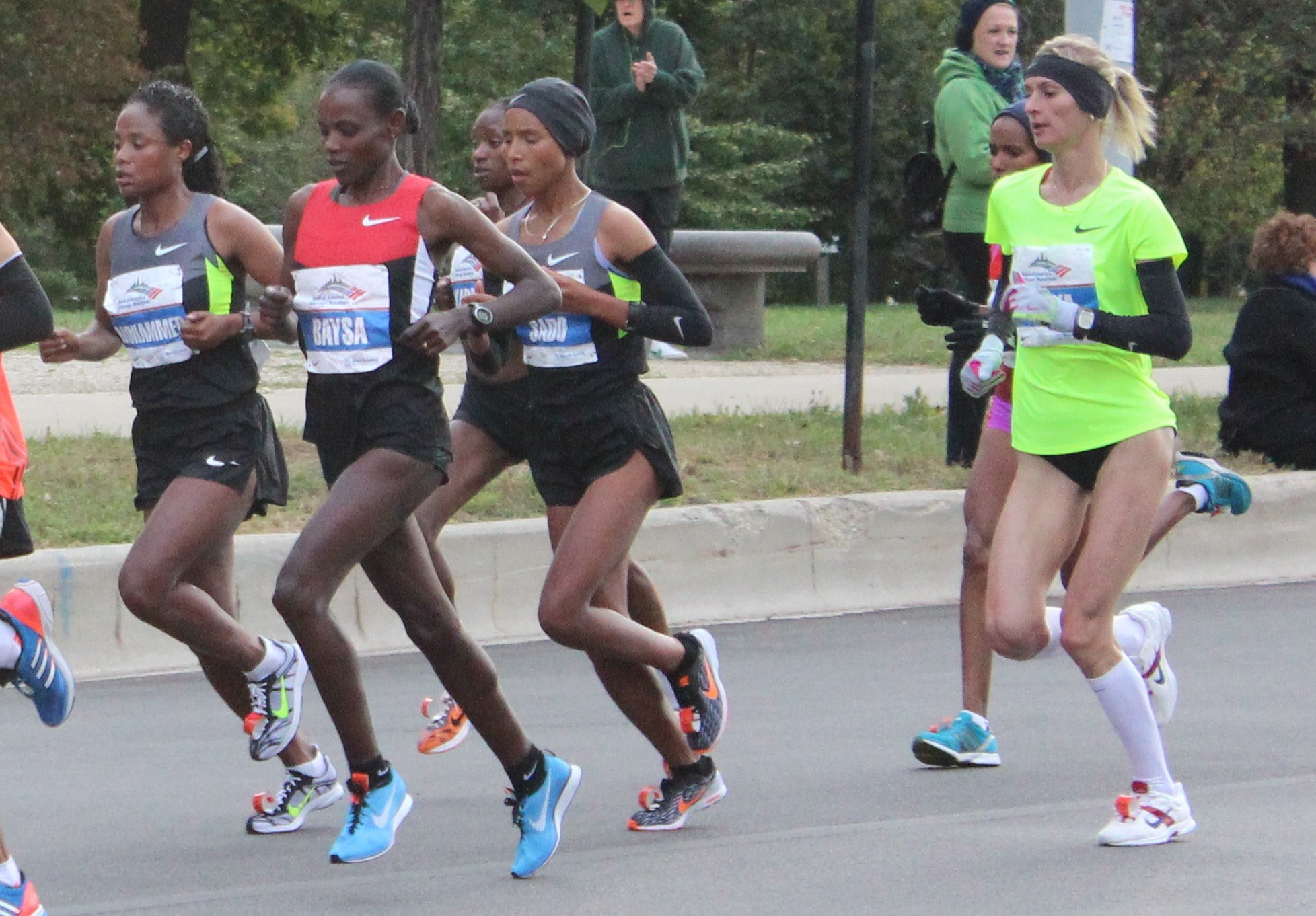
Winner Atsede Baysa (in red) leading the women's pack

Position	Athlete	Nationality	Time
Gold medal	Atsede Baysa	Ethiopia	2:22:03 PB
Silver medal	Rita Jeptoo	Kenya	2:22:04 PB
Bronze medal	Lucy Wangui Kabuu	Kenya	2:22:41
4	Liliya Shobukhova	Russia	2:22:59
5	Caroline Rotich	Kenya	2:23:22 PB
6	Mariya Konovalova	Russia	2:25:38
7	Fatuma Sado	Ethiopia	2:26:09 PB
8	Renee Metivier Baillie	United States	2:27:17 PB
9	Dot McMahon	United States	2:32:11
10	Stephanie Pezzullo	United States	2:32:42

=== Wheelchair ===
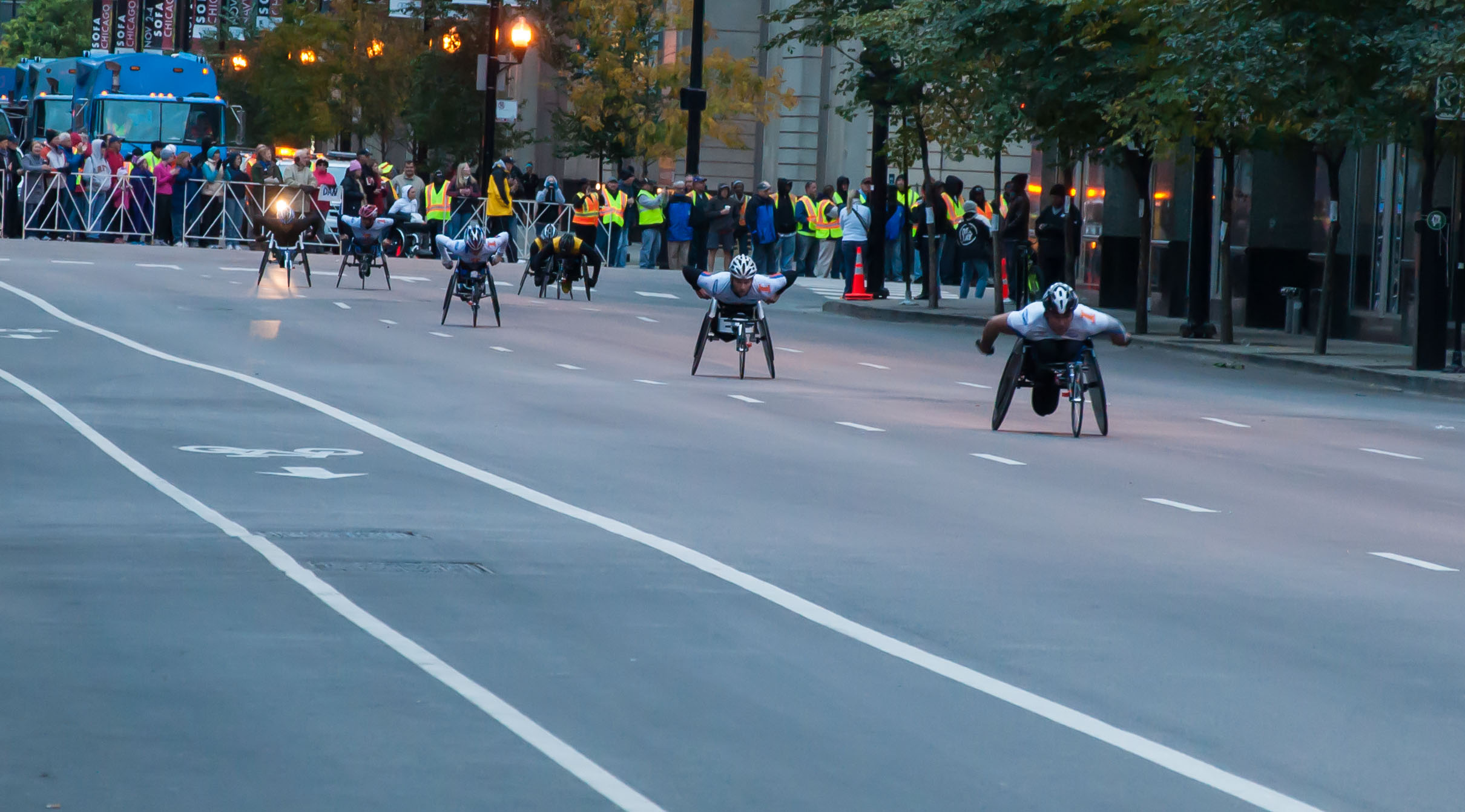
The first turn of the men's wheelchair race

Men

Position	Athlete	Nationality	Time
Gold medal	Josh Cassidy	Canada	1:32:58
Silver medal	Adam Bleakney	United States	1:34:23
Bronze medal	Joshua George	United States	1:36:06

Women

Position	Athlete	Nationality	Time
Gold medal	Tatyana McFadden	United States	1:49:52
Silver medal	Susannah Scaroni	United States	1:56:30
Bronze medal	Kelsey LeFevour	United States	2:20:02

== See also ==
- List of winners of the Chicago Marathon
