= Dorcas Tuitoek =

Kenyan long-distance runner

Personal information
- Full name: Dorcas Jepchirchir Tuitoek
- Nationality: Kenyan
- Born: January 31, 1998 (age 28)

Sport
- Sport: Athletics
- Events: Long-distance running (10K, Half marathon, Marathon)

Dorcas Tuitoek (born 31 January 1998), also known by her full name Dorcas Jepchirchir Tuitoek, is a Kenyan long-distance runner known for her success in road racing events ranging from 10 kilometres to the marathon. Her international breakthrough came in 2023 with standout victories at the Roma–Ostia Half Marathon and the Hamburg Marathon.

== Career ==
Tuitoek began making a mark in Kenyan athletics during the late 2010s. By January 2021, her growing promise earned her coverage in The Star newspaper ahead of the Discovery Kenya Cross Country meet in Eldoret, identifying her as a rising contender in the national running scene.

Her first significant international result came in 2020, when she finished second at the BOclassic in Bolzano, Italy, running a personal best of 30:44 over 10 kilometres.

In 2022, she won the Publix Atlanta Half Marathon in Georgia, USA, setting a course record of 1:08:22.

Tuitoek's international breakthrough came in 2023. She opened the season by winning the Roma–Ostia Half Marathon in 1:06:21, the second-fastest time ever recorded at the event. A month later, she won the Hamburg Marathon in dramatic fashion, clocking 2:20:09 after overtaking the race leader—Ethiopia's Tiruye Mesfin—who fell in the final stretch.

Later that year, she recorded a new marathon personal best of 2:20:02 with a third-place finish at the Amsterdam Marathon.

In 2024, she placed second at the Prague Marathon, finishing in 2:24:50 in a strong international field.

== Personal bests ==
As of May 2025:

- 10K Road – 30:44 (Bolzano, 2020)
- Half Marathon – 1:06:21 (Rome, 2023)
- Marathon – 2:20:02 (Amsterdam, 2023)
