= Fatuma Sado =

Ethiopian long-distance runner

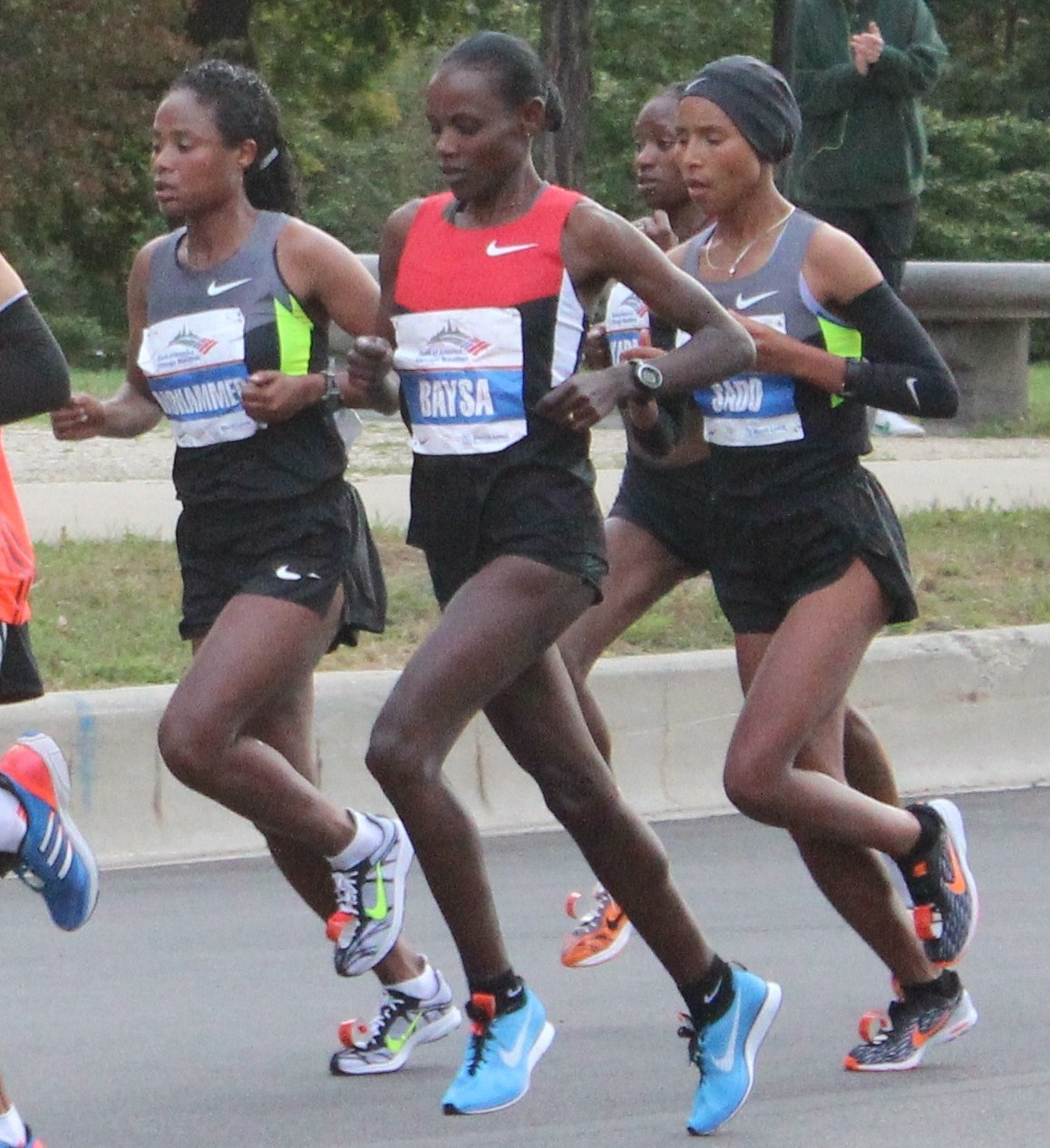
Fatuma (right) among the leaders at the 2012 Chicago Marathon

Fatuma Sado Dergo (born 11 October 1991) is an Ethiopian long-distance runner who competes in marathon races. She has a personal best of 2:26:09 hours and has won marathons in Hamburg, Los Angeles and Xiamen.

Fatuma signed up with athletics agents Elite Sports Management International and began running at international road races at the age of eighteen. In her first year of competition abroad she won the Casablanca 10K in a time of 31:39 minutes, ran 1:11:44 for third at the Rabat Half Marathon and came second at the Zhuhai Half Marathon in China. She opened 2011 with personal bests of 69:02 for the half marathon (runner-up at the Humarathon) and 51:10 for 15 km (second at the 15 km du Puy-en-Velay). In May she made her successful debut over the full marathon distance, as she won the Hamburg Marathon with a run of 2:28:30 hours. Later that year she improved to 2:28:01 with a run at the Istanbul Marathon, coming second behind stablemate Alemitu Abera.

Fatuma had five outings in the 2012 season and built her standing as an elite marathon runner. She was runner-up at the Mumbai Marathon in January (running 2:30:20) and finished in 2:25:39 hours on the Los Angeles Marathon's downhill course, where she won the women's race and also the gender challenge, which saw the women's field start 17 minutes and 31 seconds ahead of the elite men. She claimed the title and set the course record at the Pittsburgh Half Marathon in May then entered her first major marathon at the 2012 Chicago Marathon, where she placed seventh in a personal best of 2:26:09 hours. She closed the year with a win at the Zhuhai Half Marathon.

The Xiamen Marathon was her first race of 2013 and she won the third marathon of her career with a time of 2:27:35 hours. Later that year she also participated at the Lille Half Marathon, placing fifth with a time of 1:12:27 hours. Since 2013, she has continued to participate in various races around the world. In 2014, she won the Beijing Marathon with a time of 2:30:03 hours, and in 2015, she set her personal best marathon time of 2:24:16 hours at the Toronto Waterfront Marathon, placing third. She came back to the Xiamen Marathon in 2018 to take first place again, with a time of 2:26:41 hours, and she won the Osaka International Women's Marathon in 2019 with a time of 2:25:39.

== Personal bests ==
- 10 kilometres – 31:39 min (2010)
- 15 kilometres – 51:10 min (2011)
- Half marathon – 1:09:02 (2011)
- Marathon – 2:24:16 (2015)
