= Atsede Bayisa =

Ethiopian long-distance runner

Atsede Baysa
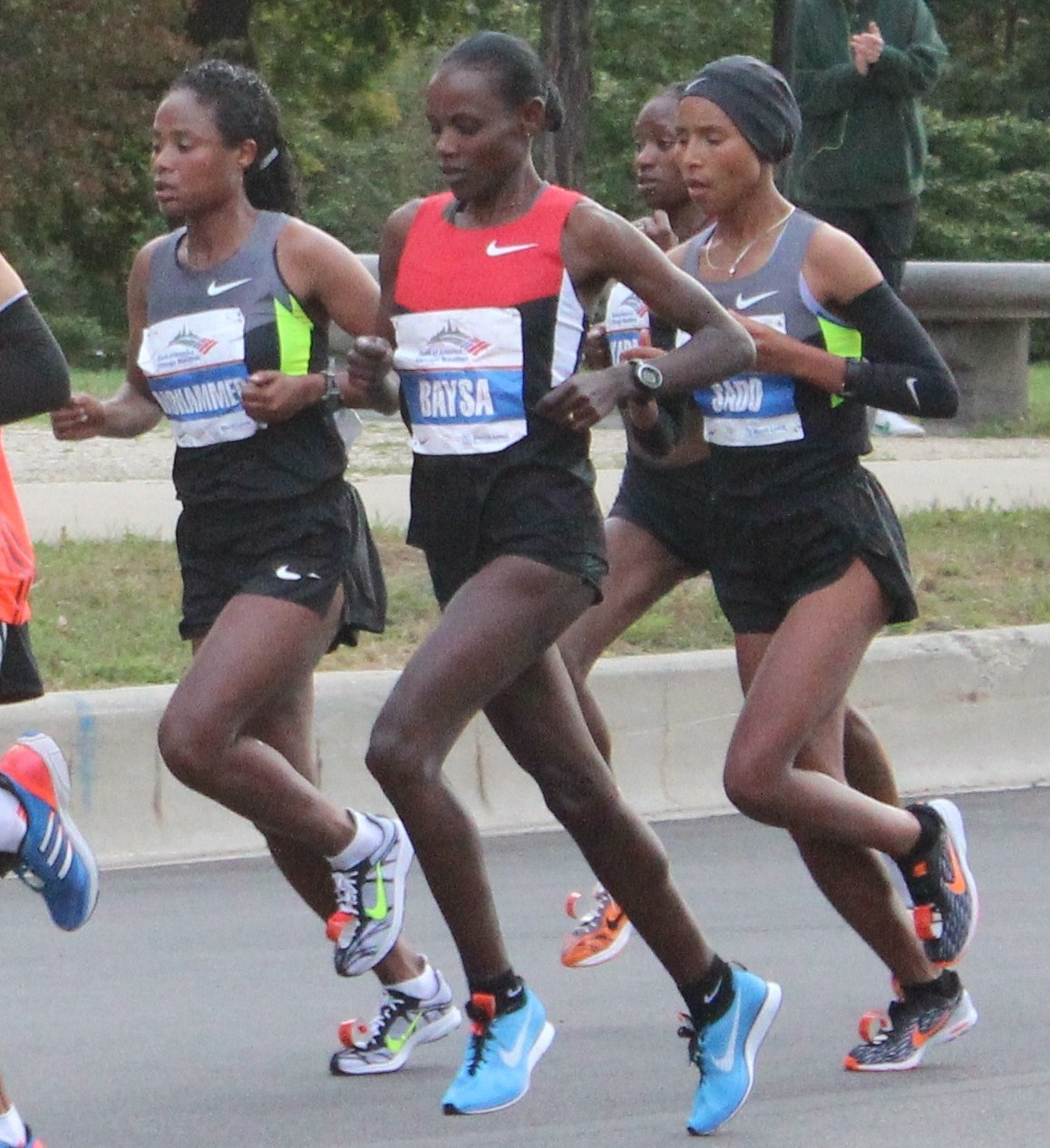
- Atsede (centre) leading at the 2012 Chicago Marathon

Personal information
- Born: 16 April 1987 (age 39) Dire Dawa, Ethiopia

Sport
- Country: Ethiopia
- Sport: Women's athletics

Achievements and titles
- Personal bests: Marathon: 2:22:03 (2012); Half marathon: 1:07:34 (2013)
Medal record
Women's athletics
Representing Ethiopia
World Road Running Championships
Silver medal – second place	2007 Udine	Team
All-Africa Games
Silver medal – second place	2007 Algiers	Half marathon

Atsede Bayisa Tesema, also known as Atsede Bayisa (born 16 April 1987), is an Ethiopian long-distance runner who specialises in road running events. She has won the Chicago Marathon, Boston Marathon and Paris Marathon twice. She has also won at the Xiamen International Marathon and the Istanbul Marathon.

She represented Ethiopia at the 2007 IAAF World Road Running Championships (taking the team silver) and at the 2009 World Championships in Athletics in the marathon race. She was the half marathon silver medallist at the 2007 All-Africa Games.

== Career ==
She started her international career at the Tokyo Women's Marathon and Nagano Marathon in 2006. She placed fourth in the 2007 Rotterdam Marathon and clocked a time of 2:33:54. Her first major event was 2007 All-Africa Games, where she took the half marathon silver medal behind Souad Aït Salem. A few months later she participated in the 2007 IAAF World Road Running Championships and finished in eleventh place, helping the Ethiopian women to the team silver medal. Following this, she won the Istanbul Marathon, recording a new personal best of 2:29:05. She did not make significant progression in 2008, with fifth-place finishes at both the Rome City Marathon and Toronto Marathon being the highlights of her year.

In 2009, she started with a ninth-place finish at the Dubai Marathon with a time of 2:29:13. Victory in a personal best time of 2:24:42 at the Paris Marathon marked a new high for Baysa, having won her first IAAF Gold Label Road Race. Baysa was selected for the women's marathon at the 2009 World Championships in Athletics, but she did not match her previous form and finished in 27th place. She went on to take seventh-place finish in 2:32:05 at the Frankfurt Marathon in October.

Baysa made a strong start to 2010 by becoming the first foreign athlete to win the women's race at the Xiamen International Marathon. She led the race uncontested and finished in 2:28:53. Despite cold conditions, she also won the Paris Half Marathon in March, recording a time of 1:11:05. She set her eyes on defending her Paris Marathon title in April and her front running tactics succeeded in record time: finishing in first place in 2:22:04, she beat Marleen Renders' course record which had stood since 2002 and knocked over two minutes off her previous best. She ran at the 2010 Chicago Marathon in October and started well by setting a fast pace from the beginning, establishing a significant lead by the halfway point, and though it cost her at the end, she won with a time of 2:23:40, beating her closest challenger, Desiree Davila, by two minutes, forty seconds. She entered the Delhi Half Marathon in November but managed only fifth place over the half distance.

She opened her 2011 at the Dubai Marathon, but finished in fifth place some three minutes behind the winner Aselefech Mergia. Another fifth came at the 2011 London Marathon, where she was one place behind her compatriot Bezunesh Bekele. She ran in two French races in October: she was the winner of the half marathon race at the Reims à Toutes Jambes and came second to Lydia Cheromei at the Marseille-Cassis Internationale.

She ran a time of 2:23:13 hours at the 2012 Dubai Marathon, which was only worth eighth place in a fast women's race. She won the Tarsus Half Marathon in a course record of 69:39 minutes in March before going on to place ninth at the 2012 London Marathon. While running at the 2012 Chicago Marathon, she drew on her experience of 2010 and did not falter in the second half of the race, racing away in the final section to beat Rita Jeptoo for what at the time was her first Chicago women's title (the 2010 title was awarded on 6 August 2015, following an IAAF review). She ended the year with a dominant performance at the Montferland Run, winning unchallenged after breaking away from the pack in the first 5 km of the race.

She won the 2016 Boston Marathon, but gave Bobbi Gibb her trophy; Gibb said in 2017 she would go to Baysa's native Ethiopia and return it to her.

== Personal bests ==
Event	Time (h:m:s)	Venue	Date
10 kilometres	32:10	New Delhi, India	21 November 2010
20 kilometres	1:05:47	Udine, Italy	14 October 2007
Half marathon	1:07:34	Barcelona, Spain	17 February 2013
Marathon	2:22:03	Chicago, United States	7 October 2012

- All information taken from IAAF profile.

== International competitions ==
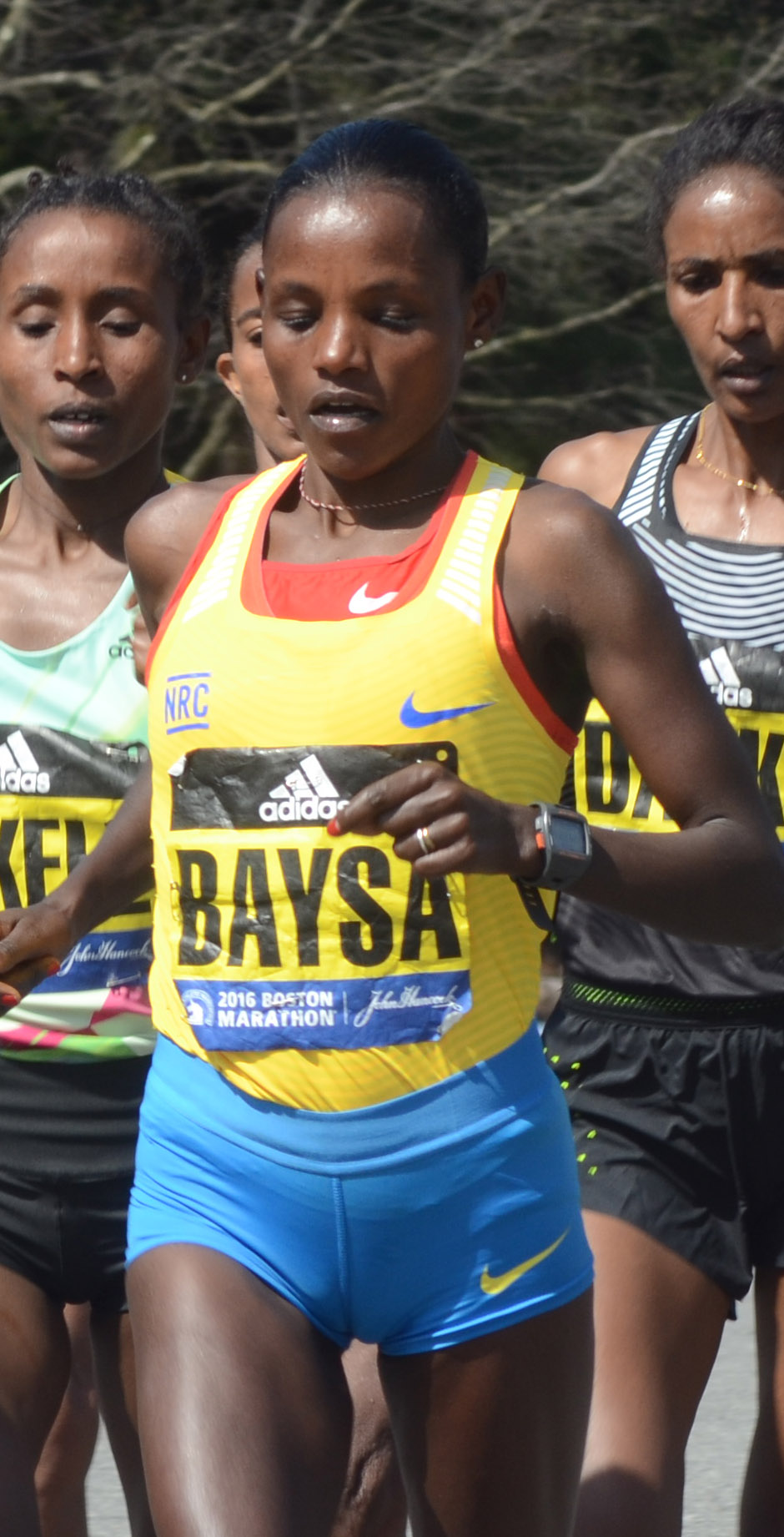
Atsede Baysa Tesema, female winner of 2016 Boston Marathon approaching halfway point

Year	Competition	Venue	Position	Event	Notes
Representing Ethiopia
2007	All-Africa Games	Algiers, Algeria	2nd	Half marathon	
2007	World Road Running Championships	Udine, Italy	11th	Half marathon	Individual
2007	World Road Running Championships	Udine, Italy	2nd	Half marathon	Team
2009	World Championships	Berlin, Germany	27th	Marathon	2:36:04

== Road race wins ==
- Istanbul Marathon: 2007
- Paris Marathon: 2009, 2010
- Xiamen International Marathon: 2010
- Paris Half Marathon: 2010
- Chicago Marathon: 2010, 2012
- Montferland Run: 2012
- Boston Marathon: 2016
