= Julius Sumaye =

Tanzanian long-distance runner

Personal information
- Nationality: Tanzanian
- Born: 12 September 1964 (age 61)

Sport
- Sport: Long-distance running
- Event: Marathon

Julius Sumaye (born 12 September 1964 or 1965) is a Tanzanian long-distance runner. He competed in the men's marathon at the 1996 Summer Olympics. In 1992 he won the Hamburg Marathon in Germany, the only Tanzanian to have ever won this race.
