= Shami Abdulahi =

Ethiopian long-distance runner

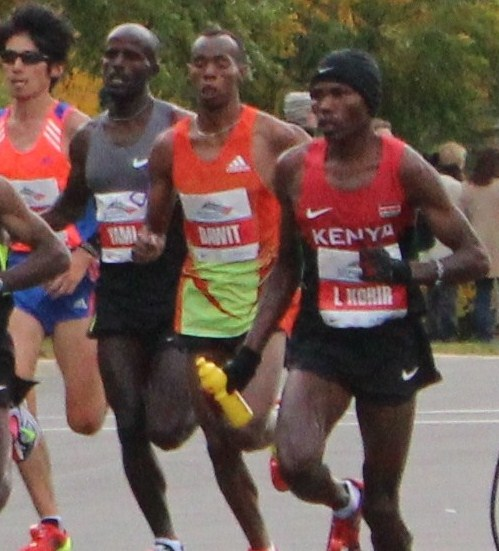
Shami Abdulahi (centre) at the 2012 Chicago Marathon.

Shami Abdulahi Dawit (born 16 July 1984) is an Ethiopian long-distance runner who specialises in marathon races. He won the 2012 Hamburg Marathon in a course record time and has a personal best of 2:05:42 hours for the distance.

== Biography ==
A late-comer to elite level athletics, his first appearance in a European race came at the 2009 Marathon des Alpes-Maritimes, where he came seventh in a time of 2:14:09 hours. He ran on the Italian road circuit in 2010, coming eighth at the Rome City Marathon before making a breakthrough at the Carpi Marathon, where he reached the podium for the first time (his time of 2:09:50 hours bringing him third place).

Shami proved himself adept at the half marathon distance in June 2011 as he won the Olomouc Half Marathon, beating the more favoured Eliud Kiptanui, in a personal best run of 1:00:44 hours. He was among the leaders for most of the 2011 Rome City Marathon and fell back to third in the final stages, although he managed a personal best run of 2:09:42 hours. He came close to stopping Kenneth Mburu Mungara from winning his fourth straight Toronto Waterfront Marathon as both runners recorded a time of 2:09:51 hours, but it was his Kenyan counterpart who crossed the line first.

The 2012 Dubai Marathon in January had one of the fastest fields in the history of marathon running, and Shami improved significantly on the fast course to record a personal best of 2:05:42 hours. He finished seventh overall and progressed into the top-40 on the all-time rankings. Three months later he won his first major race at the Hamburg Marathon and his time of 2:05:58 hours was a new course record for the German competition. He was a little slower (2:08:39) on his third outing of the year, the 2012 Chicago Marathon, and he only just made the top ten. A year passed until he next competed, when he managed fourth at the 2013 Amsterdam Marathon with a run of 2:08:02 hours. He placed third at the Toronto Waterfront Marathon in 2014, but his career ceased thereafter, with his only other performance being a failure to finish at the 2017 Venice Marathon.
