= Oleksandra Shafar =

Belarusian long-distance runner

Oleksandra Shafar (née Duliba, Belarusian: Аляксандра Дуліба; born 5 January 1988) is a Belarusian long-distance runner.

Duliba won the 2013 Los Angeles Marathon in her first marathon. She then finished 4th at the 2013 Chicago Marathon. At the 2014 Boston Marathon she placed 6th.

Duliba is the national record holder in the marathon for Belarus.

In 2016, she was given a two-year ban for breaking anti-doping regulations. Her competition results from 11 October 2013 were annulled and her suspension began on 28 September 2015.

In 2019, she competed in the women's marathon at the 2019 World Athletics Championships held in Doha, Qatar. She did not finish her race.
