= 2014 Boston Marathon =

Footrace in Boston, Massachusetts, USA

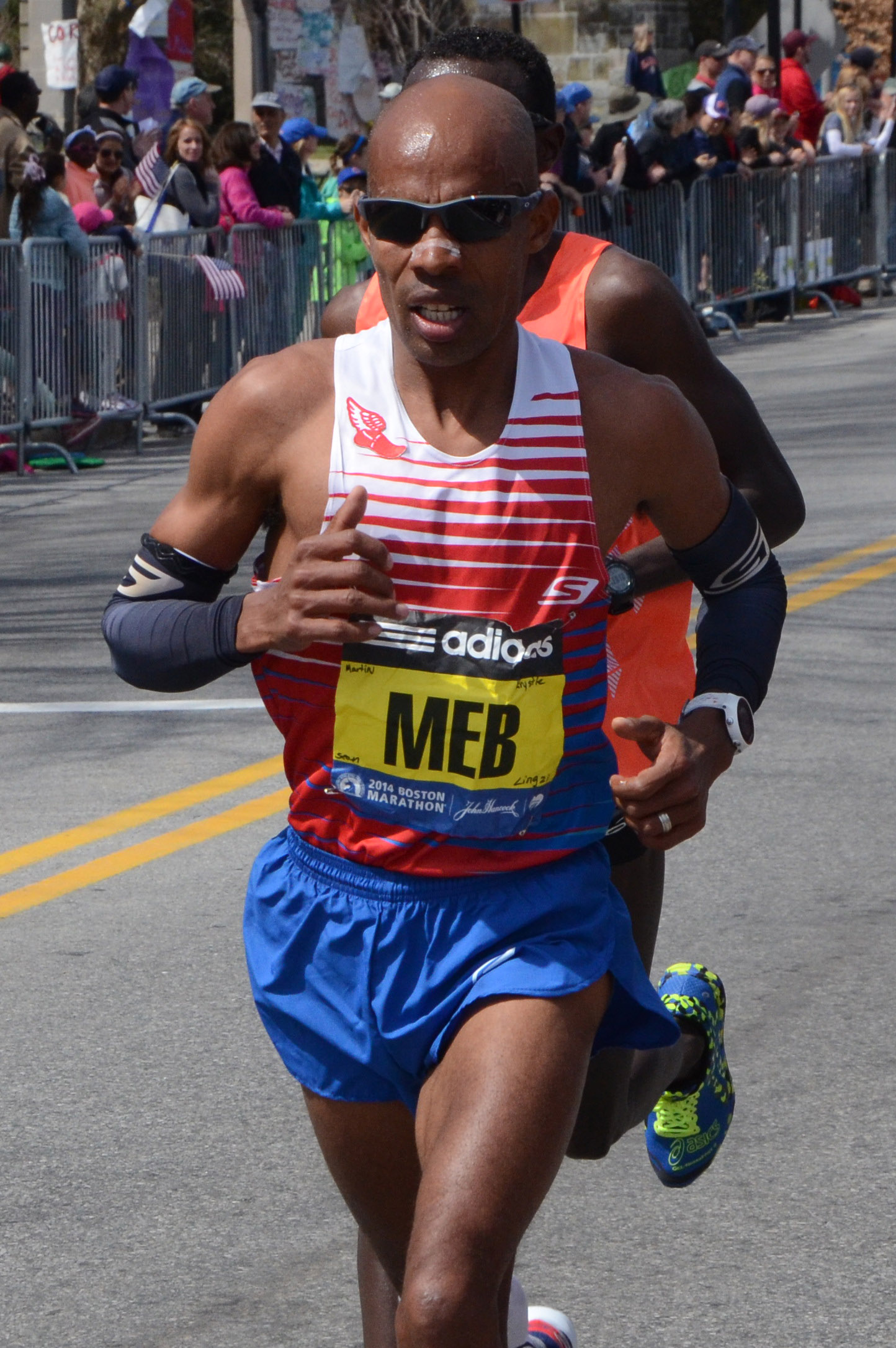
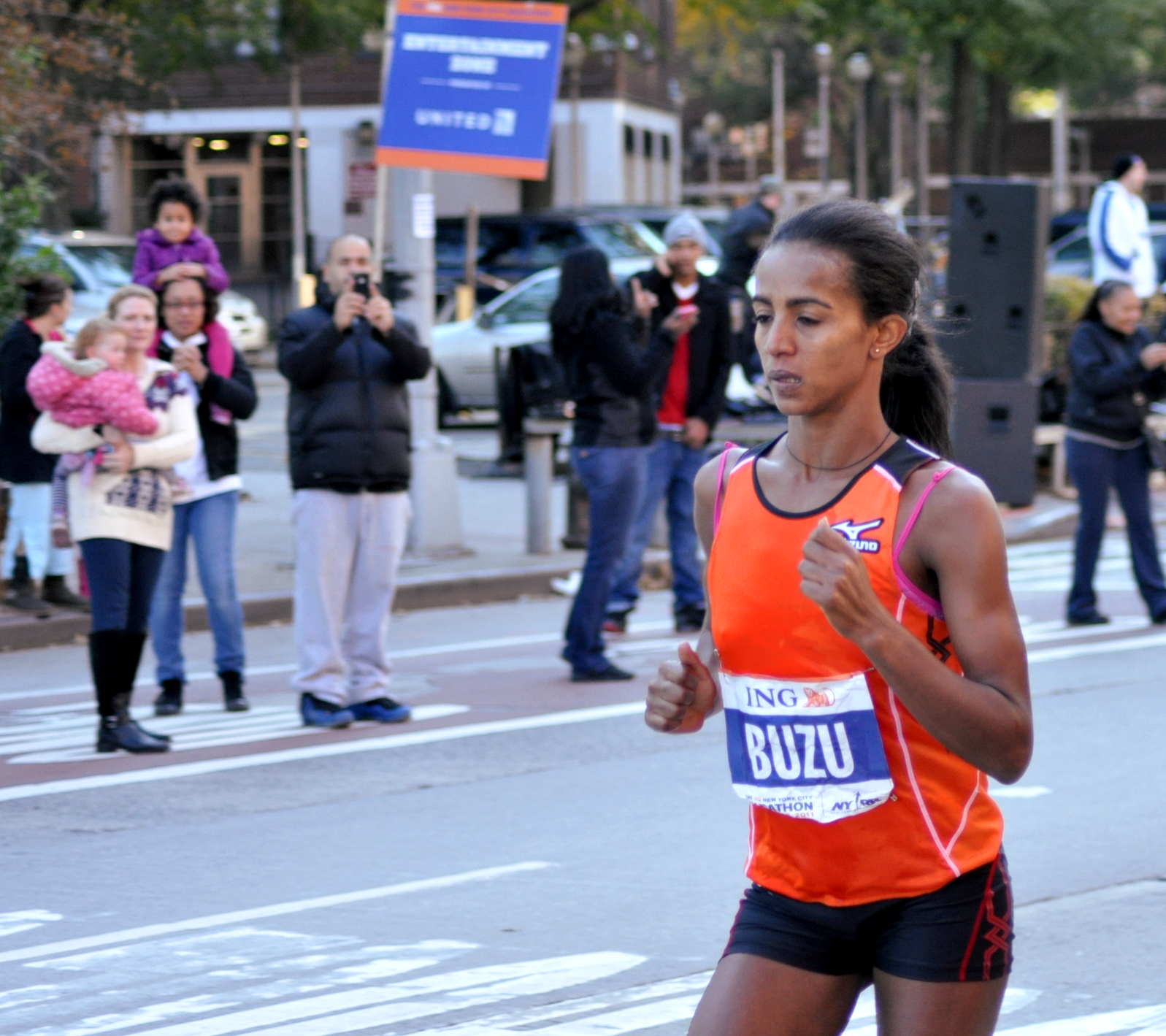
- Meb Keflezighi, male winner near halfway point in Wellesley and Women's winner Bizunesh Deba.
- Venue: Boston, Massachusetts
- Dates: April 21

Champions
- Men: Meb Keflezighi (2:08:37)
- Women: Buzunesh Deba (2:19:59)
- Wheelchair men: Ernst F. Van Dyk (1:20:36)
- Wheelchair women: Tatyana McFadden (1:35:06)

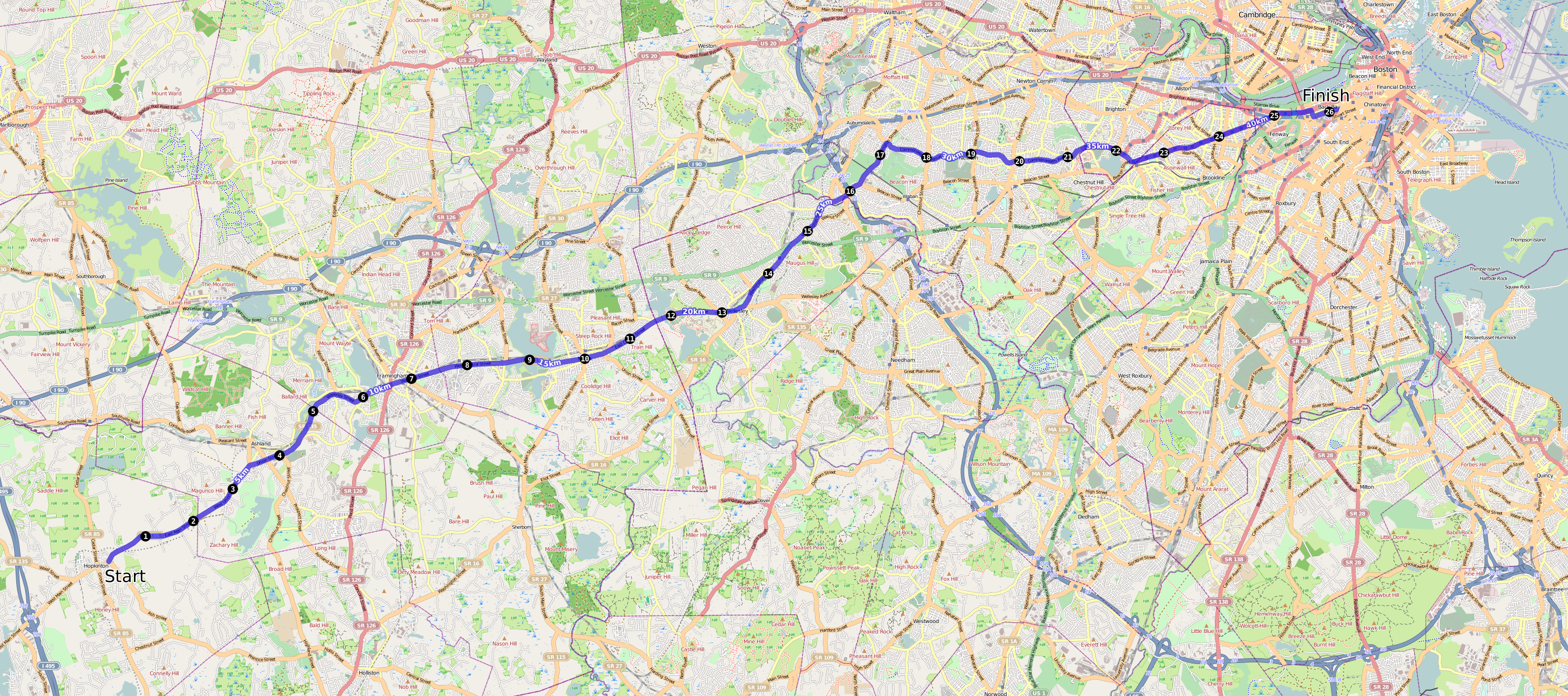
Boston Marathon course map

The 2014 Boston Marathon took place in Boston, Massachusetts, on Monday, April 21. It was the 118th official running of the Boston Marathon, traditionally held on Patriots' Day. The race is organized by the Boston Athletic Association, and has been happening yearly since 1897 (the 2020 Boston Marathon was held virtually due to the COVID-19 pandemic). On account of the 2013 Boston Marathon bombings, extra security measures were implemented. They started a safety committee which began meeting in January of each year, as well as had a multi-agency coordination center to provide a place for people to go who were in need of help during the course of the race. New laws included the Post Disaster Mental Health Act were implemented which provides mental health services for places after a disaster even if it is not considered extreme enough to be a Major Disaster. The 2014 Marathon had about 36,000 registered participants, second only to the 1996 race in number of entries.

== History behind the marathon ==
The Boston Marathon is an annual race stretched from multiple cities in eastern and some of western Massachusetts. It was created under the Boston Athletic Association by the inaugural U.S. Olympic team manager John Graham. Due to his admiration of the first Olympic Games several decades earlier, he and Herbert H. Holton, a Boston businessman, created the popular marathon.

== Race description ==
Racers begin by meeting in Boston Common on race day where they are then bused to the starting line, also called the start village. At the village there are concessions like bagels and coffee.

The course runs through 26 miles 385 yards (42.195 km) of roads, mostly following Route 135, Route 16, Route 30, and city streets into the center of Boston, where the official finish line is located on Boylston Street in Copley Square alongside the Boston Public Library. The race runs through Hopkinton, Ashland, Framingham, Natick, Wellesley, Newton, Brookline, and Boston. The race is challenging to get into as qualification times are getting faster each year.

== 2014 Marathon ==
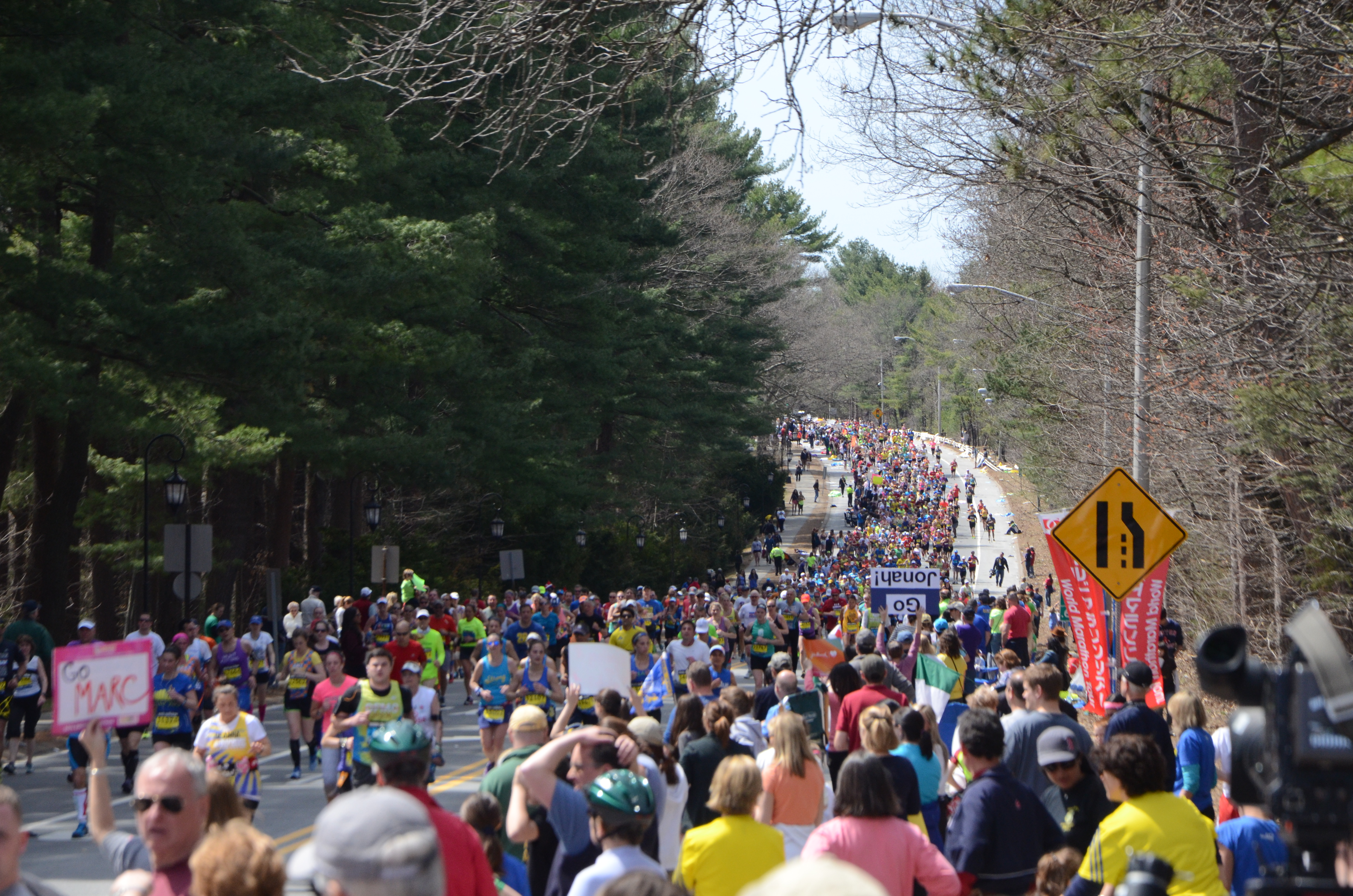
2014 Boston Marathon Crowd

The race was held on April 21, 2014. Over a million people were expected to line the marathon route to watch the race, twice the number who attend during a typical year. Because of increased participation, the qualifying time lowered by 1 minute 38 seconds. At the start, a moment of silence was held in memory of the 2013 bombings. The men and women's wheelchair group began their race at 8:50 am. The race started for the elite women at 9:32, while the elite men started half an hour later. Another moment of silence was announced (at least for television viewers) at 2:49 pm, in memory of the 2013 bombings, commemorating the exact minute when the 2013 bombings had occurred. The song "Boston Strong" was also heard playing at the starting line.

Bizunesh Deba (26) of Ethiopia crossed the finish line in 2:19:59 to win the race, setting a new course record. The men's competition was won by Meb Keflezighi (38) of the United States with a time of 2:08:37, marking the first time the race had been won by an American male runner in over 30 years.

=== Doping ban ===
Rita Jeptoo (33) of Kenya was originally recorded as the winner, crossing the finish line with a time of 2:18:57, winning the women's competition. However, following an out-of-competition doping test in September 2014, her title was disqualified, making Buzunesh Deba the winner of the women's competition. Additionally, she was given a two-year sports ban, and in October 2016, the duration of her ban was increased to four years.

== Security ==
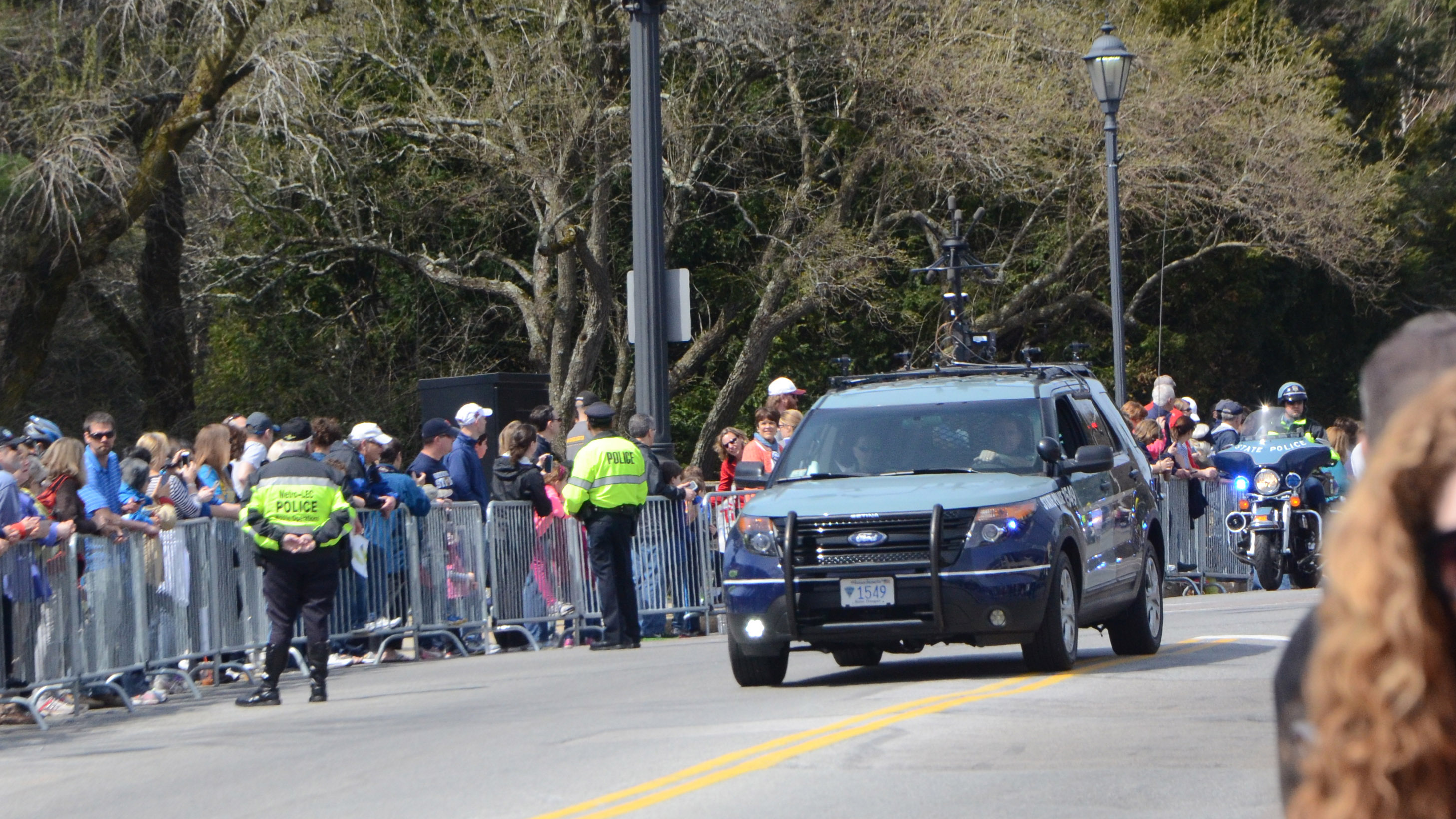

After the bombings that took place during the 2013 Boston Marathon, killing three and injuring over 260, police vowed to institute additional security measures—including bag checks and additional barriers—while maintaining a friendly, happy atmosphere. Police banned backpacks, strollers, suitcases, glass containers, some costumes and props, weight vests, and items larger than 5 by 5 inches (13 cm × 13 cm). Those with larger bags were subject to being searched. Unregistered runners previously known as "bandits" also were not allowed to participate. More than 3,500 uniformed Boston Police officers were present for security. Overall, the association was aiming to keep the event as safe as possible while still maintaining the usual fun and excitement of it.

== Results ==
Results are from the Boston Athletic Association.

Elite Men
Place	Athlete	Nationality	Time
1	Meb Keflezighi	United States	2:08:37
2	Wilson Chebet	Kenya	2:08:48
3	Franklin Chepkwony	Kenya	2:08:50
4	Vitaliy Shafar	Ukraine	2:09:37
5	Markos Geneti	Ethiopia	2:09:50
6	Joel Kimurer	Kenya	2:11:03
7	Nicholas Arciniaga	United States	2:11:47
8	Jeffrey Eggleston	United States	2:11:57
9	Paul Lonyangata	Kenya	2:12:34
10	Adil Annani	Morocco	2:12:43

Elite Women
Place	Athlete	Nationality	Time
1	Buzunesh Deba	Ethiopia	2:19:59
2	Mare Dibaba	Ethiopia	2:20:35
3	Jemima Jelagat Sumgong	Kenya	2:20:41
4	Meselech Melkamu	Ethiopia	2:21:28
5	Aleksandra Duliba	Belarus	2:21:29
6	Shalane Flanagan	United States	2:22:02
7	Sharon Cherop	Kenya	2:23:00
8	Philes Ongori	Kenya	2:23:22
9	Desiree Davila	United States	2:23:54
10	Belaynesh Oljira	Ethiopia	2:24:21

=== Wheelchair ===
Men
Place	Athlete	Nationality	Time
1	Ernst F. Van Dyk	South Africa	1:20:36
2	Kota Hokinoue	Japan	1:21:14
3	Masazumi Soejima	Japan	1:21:14
4	Marcel E. Hug	Switzerland	1:24:39
5	Jordi Madera	Spain	1:24:42

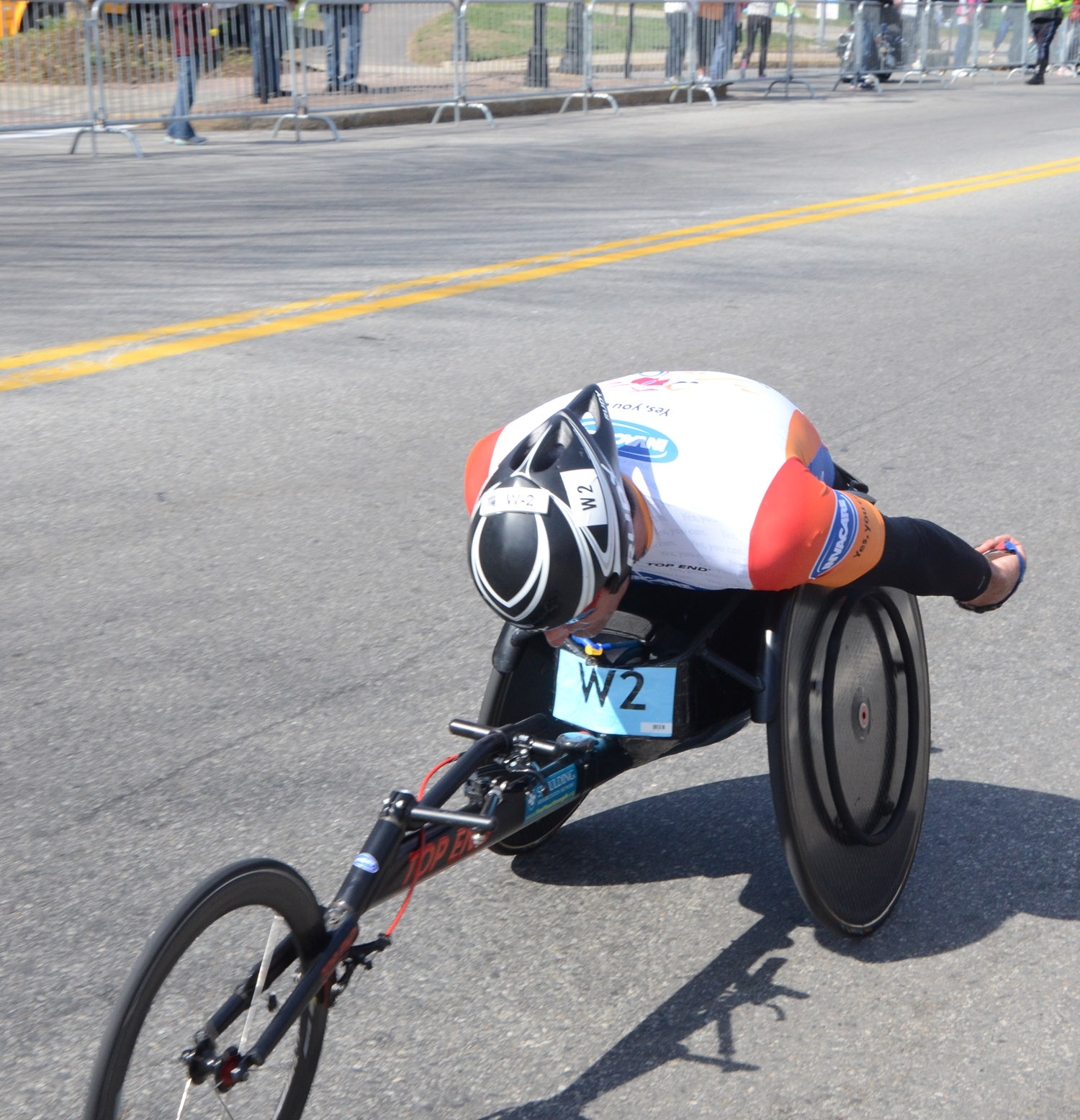
Ernst F. Van Dyk
near halfway point in Wellesley

Women
Place	Athlete	Nationality	Time
1	Tatyana McFadden	United States	1:35:06
2	Wakako Tsuchida	Japan	1:37:24
3	Susannah Scaroni	United States	1:38:33
4	Manuela Schär	Switzerland	1:39:39
5	Shelly Woods	United Kingdom	1:41:42

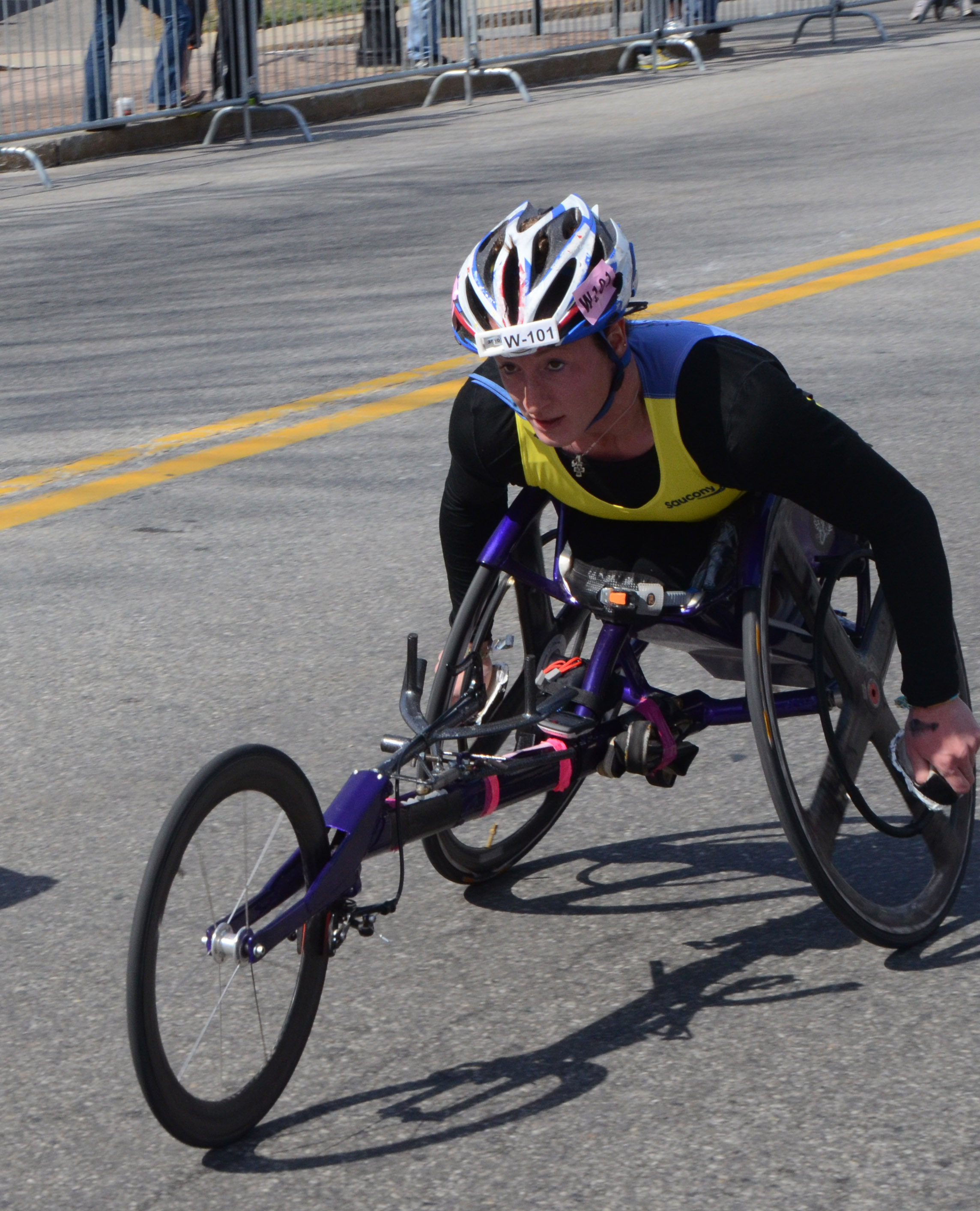
Tatyana McFadden
near halfway point in Wellesley
