= Rita Jeptoo =

Kenyan marathon runner (born 1981)

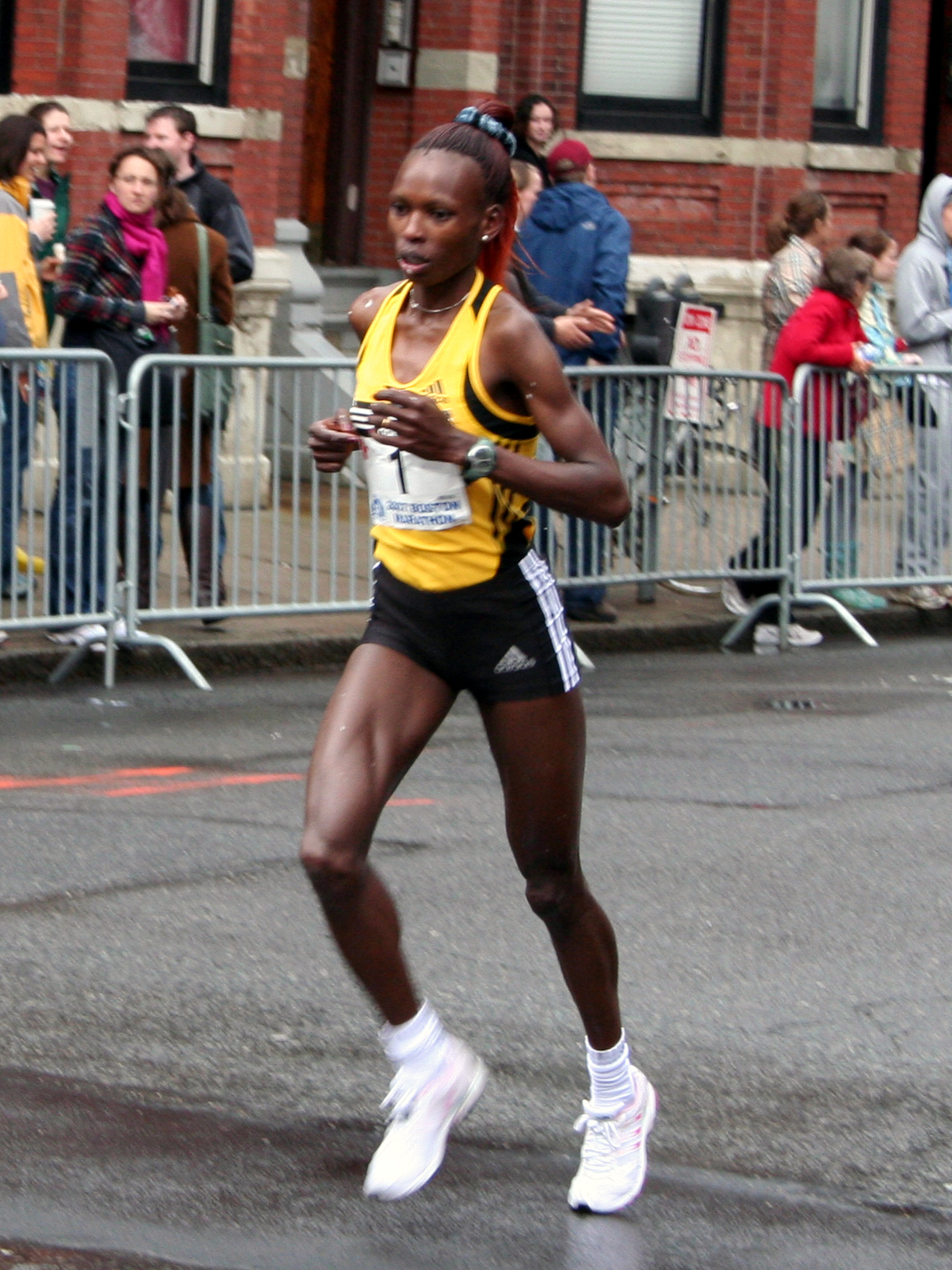
- Rita Jeptoo at the 2007 Boston Marathon

Personal information
- Born: Rita Jeptoo Sitienei; February 15, 1981 (age 45)

Sport
- Country: Kenya
- Events: Marathon, half marathon

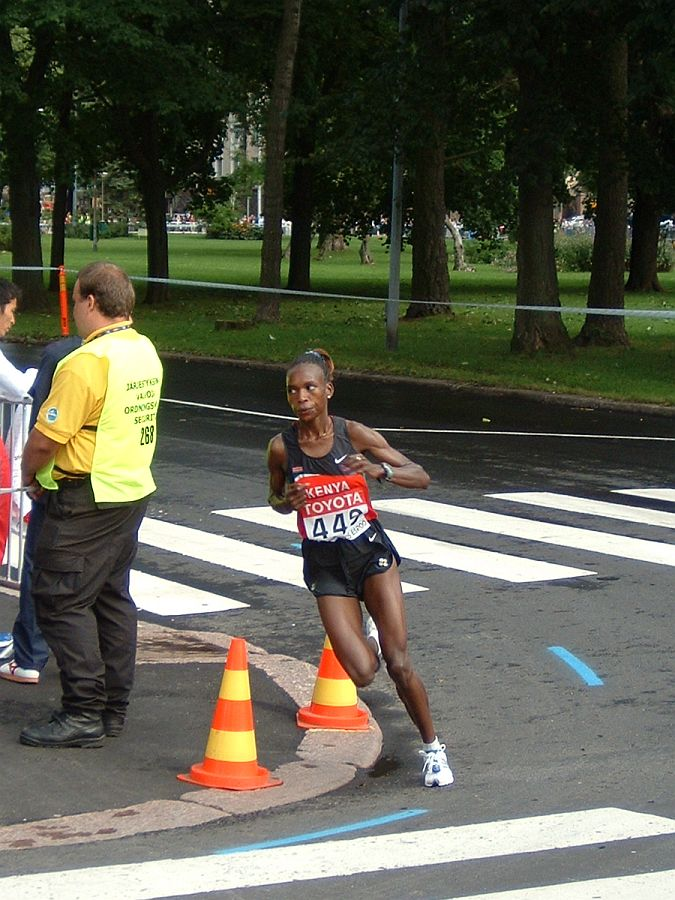
Jeptoo competing in the marathon at the 2005 World Championships

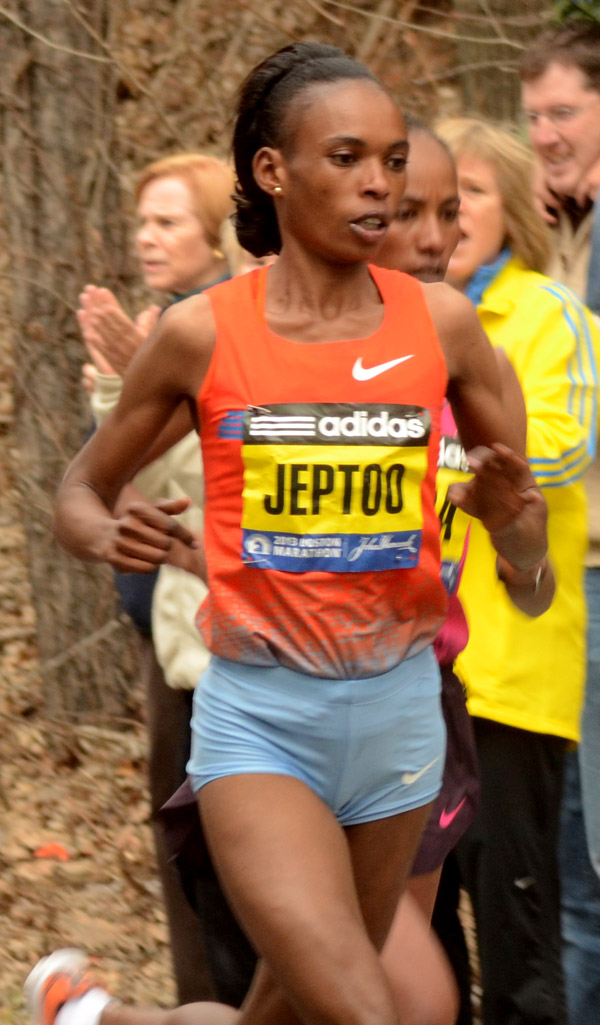
Jeptoo, running in the 2013 Boston Marathon, which she won, shown approaching the halfway point in Wellesley

Rita Jeptoo (born 15 February 1981) is a Kenyan marathon runner. Along with winning the Boston Marathon on two occasions, she has also won marathons in Chicago, Stockholm, and Milan. Jeptoo was the bronze medalist at the 2006 IAAF World Road Running Championships representing Kenya.

In 2014, Jeptoo received a two-year competition doping ban, which was later increased to four years, after testing positive for EPO in an out-of-competition test on 25 September 2014.

Jeptoo has been provisional suspended from competition by the Anti-Doping Agency of Kenya since December 2025 after testing positive for anabolic steroids.

== Career ==
Jeptoo won the 2004 Stockholm Marathon, her first marathon race, and then took a consecutive victory at the Milan Marathon. She finished third in the 2005 Turin Marathon and seventh at the 2005 World Championships.

In 2006, she set a personal best time of 2:23:38 winning the Boston Marathon, she took the title at the Paris Half Marathon, she won the bronze medal at the 2006 World Road Running Championships, she was fourth at the New York City Marathon that same year. In 2007, she finished fourth in Boston, attempting to defend her title, and was quoted as saying, "I never felt good in the cold. I couldn't get my body in a rhythm." She won the Lisbon Half Marathon that year, later going on to take seventh place in the marathon at the 2007 World Championships in Athletics. She ended her 2007 with a new course record at the Obudu Ranch International Mountain Race, earning US$50,000 as a result.

She won the Portugal Half Marathon in 2008. She was among the leading runners at the Boston and New York marathons that season, finishing third and fourth respectively. She took time off from running for maternity leave from late 2008 onwards, returning to competition in 2011. The Rotterdam Marathon was her return marathon outing and she came fifth with a time of 2:28:09 hours. She ran her fastest marathon time since 2005 at the Frankfurt Marathon, taking fifth place after 2:25:44 hours.

Returning to the site of her 2006 win, she came sixth at the 2012 Boston Marathon. She came fourth at the Beach to Beacon 10K and Falmouth Road Race, but delivered her best performance in half a decade at the 2012 Chicago Marathon. A tight duel with Atsede Baysa in the latter stages of the race resulted in her narrowly finishing as runner-up, but her time of 2:22:04 hours knocked over a minute and half off her six-year-old personal best.

The 2013 RAK Half Marathon was so fast that Jeptoo improved her best to 66:27 minutes—making her the fifth fastest ever—but left her in third place in the race.

In 2013, prior to the bombing, she won both the Boston Marathon in a time of 2:26:25, and the Chicago Marathon in a time of 2:19:57 (personal best).

Jeptoo participated in the Boston Marathon in 2014 and was initially recorded as the winner, with a time of 2:18:57. However, following her doping ban she was disqualified and stripped of the title and course record.

=== 2014 case ===
Jeptoo defended her Chicago Marathon title in 2014, winning with a time of 2:24:35. However, she had a positive doping test in her "A" sample, given in Kenya two weeks before the race. Her agent Federico Rosa, a prominent name in elite marathon running, confirmed the fact but refused to reveal the responsible substance.

It was later revealed that the prohibited substance was EPO, and she was banned for two years by Athletics Kenya.

On 21 April 2015, the Court of Arbitration for Sport announced it had received two separate appeals pertaining to the ban. One, from Jeptoo, asked that the challenged decision be set aside, and the two-year suspension be lifted. The second was from the International Association of Athletics Federation (IAAF), who requested that Jeptoo's ban be increased to four years, due to "...aggravating circumstances which it argues warrant an extended period of ineligibility."

On 26 October 2016, the Court of Arbitration for Sport upheld an appeal from the IAAF against the leniency of the two-year ban given by Athletics Kenya, and instead set a four-year ban, and the annulling of all results after 17 April 2014, including her wins in the 2014 Boston and Chicago marathons, citing "her deceptive and obstructive conduct throughout the proceedings" as aggravating factors justifying the maximum penalty.

=== 2025 case ===
In December 2025, the Anti-Doping Agency of Kenya (ADAK) issued Jeptoo with a provisional suspension after testing positive for anabolic steroids.

== Personal life ==
She is married to Noah Busienei, a middle-distance runner.

== Achievements ==
Year	Competition	Venue	Position	Event	Notes
Representing Kenya
2004	Stockholm Marathon	Stockholm, Sweden	1st	Marathon	2:35:14
2004	Milan Marathon	Milan, Italy	1st	Marathon	2:28:11
2005	World Championships	Helsinki, Finland	7th	Marathon	2:24:22
2006	Paris Half Marathon	Paris, France	1st	Half marathon	1:09:56
2006	Boston Marathon	Boston, United States	1st	Marathon	2:23:38
2007	Lisbon Half Marathon	Lisbon, Portugal	1st	Half marathon	1:07:05
2013	Boston Marathon	Boston, United States	1st	Marathon	2:26:25
2013	Chicago Marathon	Chicago, United States	1st	Marathon	2:19:57
2014	Boston Marathon	Boston, United States	DSQ (1st)	Marathon	~~2:18:57 (CR)~~
2014	Chicago Marathon	Chicago, United States	DSQ (1st)	Marathon	~~2:24:35~~
