= Hamburg Marathon =

Marathon running race held in Hamburg, Germany

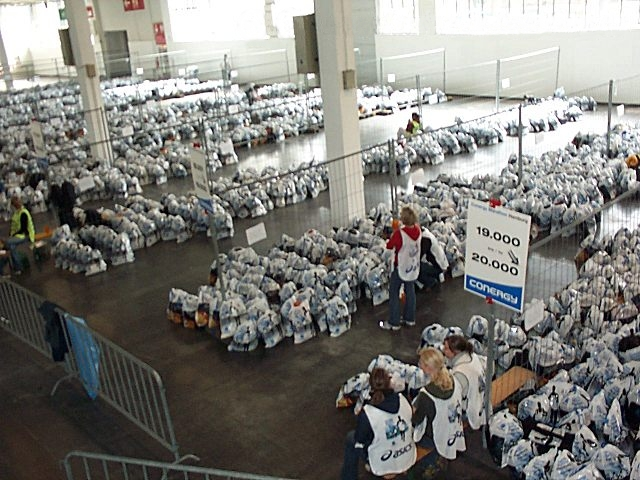
- 20,000 cloth bags waiting for the athletes during the 21st Conergy Hamburg Marathon in 2006
- Date: Late April or early May
- Location: Hamburg, Germany
- Event type: Road
- Distance: Marathon, Half marathon
- Primary sponsor: Haspa
- Established: 1986
- Course records: Men's: 2:03:46 (2025) (Kenya) Amos Kipruto; Women's: 2:17:23 (2022) (Ethiopia) Yalemzerf Yehualaw
- Website: Hamburg Marathon
- Participants: 6,618 finishers (2022); 1,979 finishers (2021); 7,774 (2019)

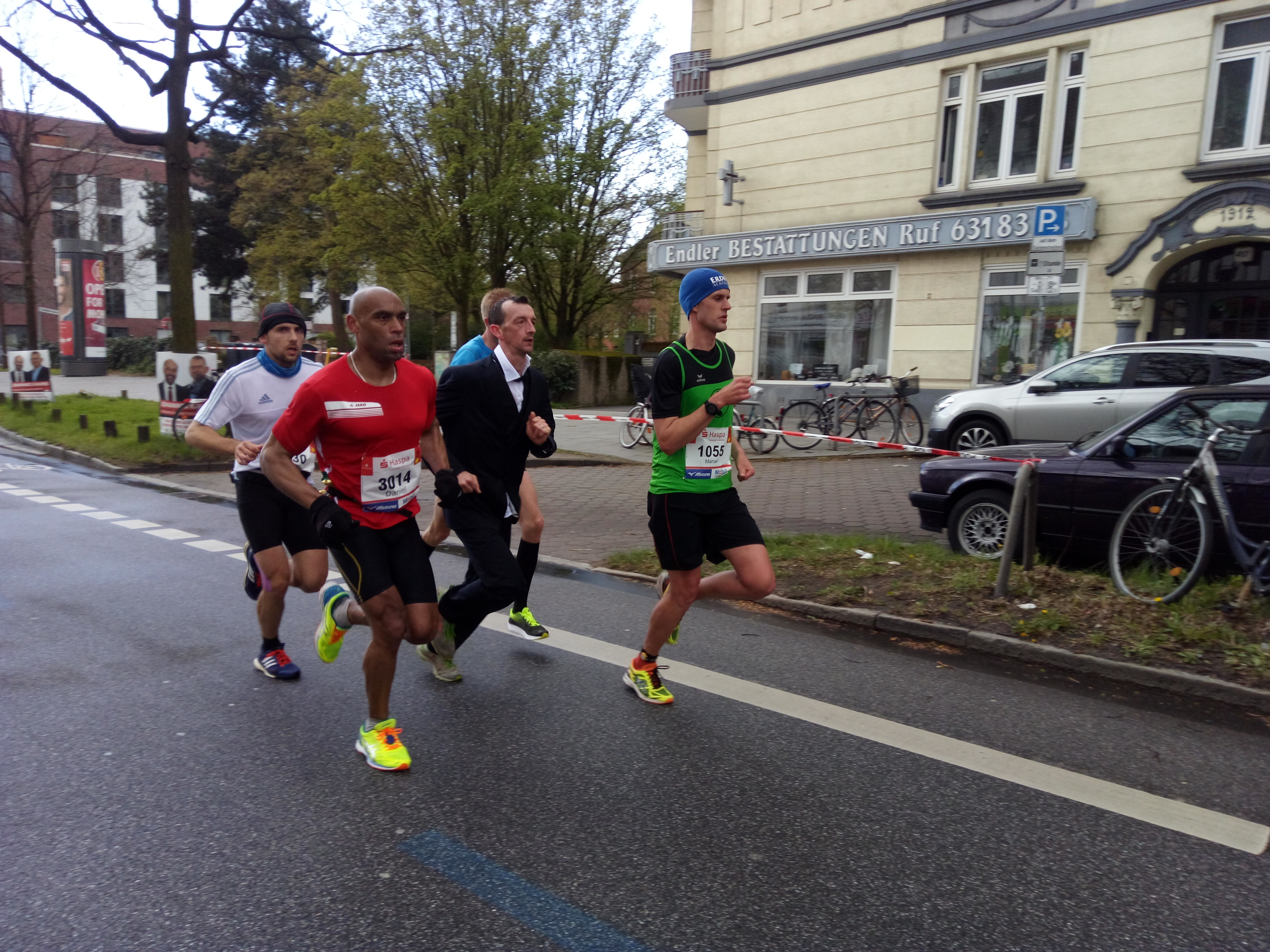
Runner in a formal suit, 2017

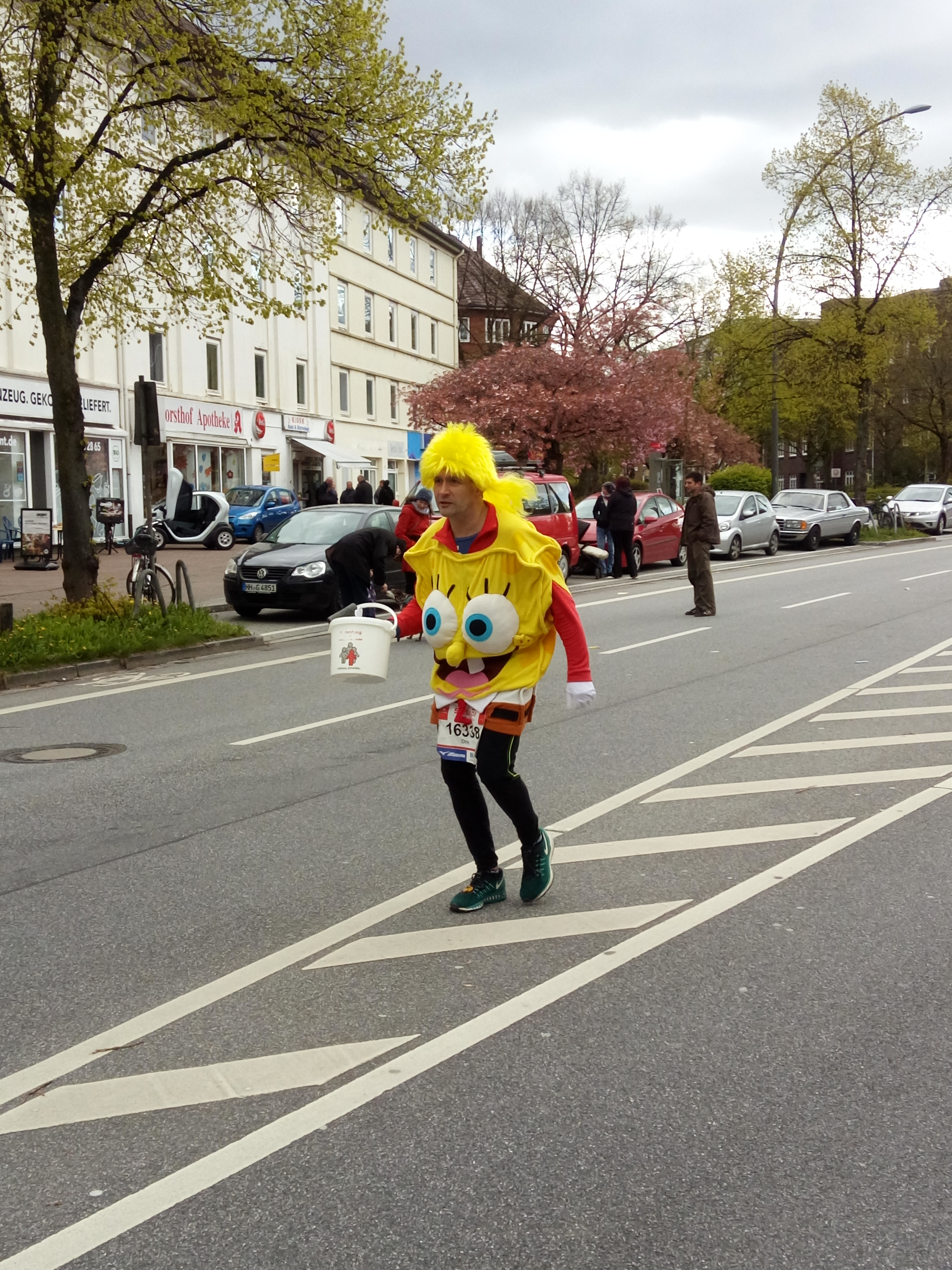
Runner in an informal suit (SpongeBob), 2017

The Hamburg Marathon (German: Hamburg-Marathon) is an annual marathon race over the classic distance of 42.195 km (26.219 mi) held in Hamburg, Germany. In 2009, 13,938 participants were counted. The marathon is categorized as a Gold Label Road Race by World Athletics.

== History ==
The first edition took place in 1986 with about 8,000 participants. The Hamburg Marathon was named for the sponsoring companies Hansemarathon (1986–1990), Shell-hanse-Marathon (1991–1997), Shell-Marathon (1998–1999), Hansaplast-Marathon (2000–2002), Olympus-Marathon (2003–2005), Conergy Marathon (2006–2008) and 2009–2010 Möbel Kraft Marathon Hamburg, with 13.938 participants. Several championships are integrated in the marathon, the Hamburg Championships, the Hamburger Betriebssport- Meisterschaften, the Hamburger Polizei- Meisterschaften. In 1988, 1995 and 1999, the German Championships, and in 2006 and 2007, the German Championships for the blind and partially sighted were competed during the Hamburg Marathon.

It is one of Germany's largest road running competitions and a total of 15,174 runners participated in the 25th edition in 2010. The record participation for the event came in 2005 when a total of 17,502 runners completed the course.

Internals disagreements within the organising group and pull-outs from high-profile sponsors affected the race between 2009 and 2011. A new organising group was established for the 2012 race and Hamburger Sparkasse ("Haspa", a regional bank) became the title sponsor. This coincided with a resurgence in the elite level race, as both men's and women's course records were broken.

The 2020 edition of the race was postponed to 2021 due to the coronavirus pandemic, with all entries automatically remaining valid for 2021.

== Winners ==
Key: Course record Country's championship race

Ed.	Year	Male	Nationality	Time	Female	Nationality	Time
39	2025.04.27	Amos Kipruto	Kenya	2:03:46	Workenesh Edesa	Ethiopia	2:17:55
38	2024.04.28	Bernard Koech	Kenya	2:04:24	Irene Cheptai	Kenya	2:18:22
37	2023.04.23	Bernard Koech	Kenya	2:04:09	Dorcas Tuitoek	Kenya	2:20:09
36	2022.04.24	Cybrian Kotut	Kenya	2:04:47	Yalemzerf Yehualaw	Ethiopia	2:17:23
35	2021.09.12	Martin Musau	Uganda	2:10:15	Gadise Mulu	Ethiopia	2:26:20
	2020	postponed due to coronavirus pandemic					
34	2019.04.28	Tadu Abate	Ethiopia	2:08:26	Dibabe Kuma	Ethiopia	2:24:42
33	2018.04.29	Solomon Deksisa	Ethiopia	2:06:34	Shitaye Eshete	Bahrain	2:24:51
32	2017.04.23	Tsegaye Mekonnen	Ethiopia	2:07:26	Jéssica Augusto	Portugal	2:25:30
31	2016.04.17	Tesfaye Abera	Ethiopia	2:06:58	Meselech Melkamu	Ethiopia	2:21:54
30	2015.04.26	Lucas Rotich	Kenya	2:07:17	Meseret Hailu	Ethiopia	2:25:41
29	2014.05.04	Shumi Dechasa	Ethiopia	2:06:43	Georgina Rono	Kenya	2:26:47
28	2013.04.21	Eliud Kipchoge	Kenya	2:05:30	Diana Lobačevskė	Lithuania	2:29:17
27	2012.04.29	Shami Abdulahi	Ethiopia	2:05:58	Netsanet Achamo (Note: Nguriatukei Rael Kiyara was the first finisher in 2:23:47 h but was later disqualified for failing the post-race drug test.)	Ethiopia	2:24:12
26	2011.05.22	Gudisa Shentema	Ethiopia	2:11:03	Fatuma Sado	Ethiopia	2:28:30
25	2010.04.25	Wilfred Kigen	Kenya	2:09:22	Sharon Cherop	Kenya	2:28:38
24	2009.04.26	Solomon Tside	Ethiopia	2:11:47	Alessandra Aguilar	Spain	2:29:01
23	2008.04.27	David Mandago	Kenya	2:07:23	Irina Timofeyeva	Russia	2:24:14
22	2007.04.29	Rodgers Rop	Kenya	2:07:32	Ayelech Worku	Ethiopia	2:29:14
21	2006.04.23	Julio Rey	Spain	2:06:52	Robe Tola	Ethiopia	2:24:35
20	2005.04.17	Julio Rey	Spain	2:07:38	Edith Masai	Kenya	2:27:06
19	2004.04.18	Vanderlei de Lima	Brazil	2:09:39	Emily Kimuria	Kenya	2:28:56
18	2003.04.27	Julio Rey	Spain	2:07:27	Hellen Kimutai	Kenya	2:25:53
17	2002.04.21	Christopher Kandie	Kenya	2:10:17	Sonja Oberem	Germany	2:26:21
16	2001.04.22	Julio Rey	Spain	2:07:46	Sonja Oberem	Germany	2:26:12
15	2000.04.16	Piotr Gładki	Poland	2:11:06	Manuela Zipse	Germany	2:31:37
14	1999.04.25	David Ngetich	Kenya	2:10:05	Katrin Dörre-Heinig	Germany	2:24:35
13	1998.04.19	Tendai Chimusasa	Zimbabwe	2:10:57	Katrin Dörre-Heinig	Germany	2:25:21
12	1997.04.27	Stephen Kirwa	Kenya	2:10:37	Renata Sobiesiak	Poland	2:29:27
11	1996.04.21	Petr Pipa	Slovakia	2:16:22	Krystyna Pieczulis	Poland	2:40:02
10	1995.04.30	Antonio Silio	Argentina	2:09:57	Angelina Kanana	Kenya	2:27:23
9	1994.04.24	Eduard Tukhbatullin	Russia	2:12:58	Angelina Kanana	Kenya	2:29:59
8	1993.05.23	Richard Nerurkar	United Kingdom	2:10:57	Gabriele Wolf	Germany	2:34:36
7	1992.05.24	Julius Sumaye	Tanzania	2:13:52	Gabriele Wolf	Germany	2:36:32
6	1991.05.26	Jörg Peter	Germany	2:10:43	Annette Fincke	Germany	2:35:48
5	1990.05.20	Jörg Peter	Germany	2:11:49	Judit Nagy	Hungary	2:33:46
4	1989.05.21	Nivaldo Filho	Brazil	2:13:21	Jolanda Homminga	Netherlands	2:40:28
3	1988.04.24	Martin Vrábeľ	(Czech Republic) Czechoslovakia	2:14:55	Charlotte Teske	West Germany	2:30:23
2	1987.04.26	Karel Lismont	Belgium	2:13:46	Charlotte Teske	West Germany	2:31:49
1	1986.05.25	Karel Lismont	Belgium	2:12:12	Magda Ilands	Belgium	2:35:17
