= Kenji (given name) =

- Pronunciation: [ˈkẽn̠ʲ.d͡ʑi] approx: KEHN-JEE
- Gender: Male

Origin
- Origin: Japanese
- Meaning: Different depending on the kanji
- Region of origin: Japan

Other names
- Related names: Ken; Ken'ichi; Kenzō

Kenji (けんじ, ケンジ) or Kenzi is a masculine Japanese given name.

== Written forms ==
Kenji can be written using different kanji characters and can mean:

- 賢二, "wise, second"
- 健二, "healthy, second"
- 健次, "healthy, next"
- 謙二, "modest, second"
- 研二, "research, second"
- 憲次, "constitution, next"
- 健司, "healthy, rule"
- 健治, "healthy, govern"
- 賢治, "wise, govern"
- 健児, "healthy, child"
- 堅志, "iron, purpose"
- 謙, "modest"

== People with the name ==
- Kenji Adachihara (足立原 健二; born 1984), Japanese former footballer
- Kenji Akabane (赤羽根 健治; born 1984), Japanese voice actor
- Kenji Akashi (明石 健志; born 1986), Japanese former professional baseball infielder
- Kenji Anan (阿南 健治; born 1962), Japanese stage and film actor
- Kenji Arabori (荒堀 謙次; born 1988), Japanese former football player
- Kenji Arai (新井 健二; born 1978), Japanese former professional football player
- Kenji Arima (有馬 賢二; born 1972), Japanese former football player and manager
- Kenji Baba (馬場 賢治; born 1985), Japanese former footballer
- Kenji Bahar (born 1997), American professional football quarterback
- Kenji Bunch (born 1973), American composer and violist
- Kenji Cabrera (ケンジ カブレラ; born 2003), Japanese professional footballer
- Kenji Dai (代 健司; born 1989), Japanese football player
- Kenji Daimanazuru (大真鶴 健司; born 1977), Japanese sumo wrestler
- Kenji Doihara (土肥原 賢二; 1883–1948), Japanese military general
- Kenji Ebisawa (海老澤 健次; born 1986), Japanese actor
- Kenji Eda (江田 憲司; born 1956), Japanese retired politician
- Kenji Ekuan (榮久庵 憲司; 1929–2015), Japanese industrial designer
- Kenji Eno (飯野 賢治; 1970–2013), Japanese musician and video game designer
- Kenji Eto (born 1948), Japanese equestrian
- Kenji Fan (born 2002), Hong Kong fashion model, actor and singer
- Kenji Fujikawa (藤川 健司; born 1984), Japanese long jumper
- Kenji Fujimitsu (藤光 謙司; born 1986), Japanese sprinter
- Kenji Fujimori (藤森 健二; born 1980), Peruvian politician, son of ex-president Alberto Fujimori
- Kenji Fujimoto (藤本 健二; born 1947), Japanese chef
- Kenji Fujinaka (藤中 憲二; born 1947), Japanese handball player
- Kenji Fujita (藤田 健児; born 1996), Japanese professional boxer
- Kenji Fukaya (深谷 賢治; born 1959), Japanese mathematician
- Kenji Fukuda (福田 健二; born 1977), Japanese former football player
- Kenji Fukui (福井 謙二; born 1953), Japanese television announcer
- Kenji Fukunaga (福永 健司; 1910–1988), Japanese politician
- Kenji Fusé (born 1965), Canadian violist and composer
- Kenji Gorré (born 1994), Netherlands professional footballer
- Kenji Goto (後藤 健二; 1967-2015), Japanese freelance video journalist, killed by ISIL
- Kenji Hada (秦 賢二; born 1981), Japanese former football player
- Kenji Haga (羽賀 研二; born 1961), Japanese television personality, actor and businessman
- Kenji Hamada (浜田 賢二; born 1972), Japanese voice actor
- Kenji Haneda (羽田 憲司; born 1981), Japanese footballer
- Kenji Hasegawa (長谷川 健志; born 1960), Japanese basketball coach
- Kenji Hatanaka (畑中 健二; 1912–1945), Japanese military officer
- Kenji Higuchi (樋口 健二; born 1937), Japanese professor of photography
- Kenji Hilke (比留木 謙司; born 1985), Japanese basketball coach and former professional basketball player
- Kenji Hirata (平田 健二; born 1944), Japanese politician
- Kenji Holloway (born 1978), serves as a member of the Mississippi House of Representatives
- Kenji Honnami (本並 健治; born 1964), Japanese former football player and manager
- Kenji Horikawa (堀川 憲司; born 1965), Japanese anime producer
- Kenji Hosoishi (born 1937), Japanese professional golfer
- Kenji Iijima (飯島 健; born 1935), Japanese field hockey player
- Kenji Ikeda (池田 健二; born 1960), Japanese retired backstroke swimmer
- Kenji Imai (actor) (今井 健二; born 1932), Japanese actor
- Kenji Imai (architect) (今井 兼次; 1895-1987), Japanese architect and professor
- Kenji Imaizumi (今泉 健司; born 1973), Japanese shogi player
- Kenji Inoue (井上 謙二; born 1976), Japanese sport wrestler
- Kenji Ishiguro (石黒 健治; born 1935), Japanese photographer
- Kenji Ishihara (石原 憲治; 1895–1984), Japanese architect
- Kenji Ishikawa (石川 健二; born 1946), Japanese swimmer
- Kenji Itami (伊丹 健治; born 1988), Japanese former professional cyclist
- Kenji Ito (伊藤 賢治; born 1968), Japanese video game composer and musician
- Kenji Jasper (born 1975) American writer and journalist
- Kenji Johjima (城島 健司; born 1976), Japanese Major League Baseball catcher
- Kenji Kageyama (景山 健司; born 1980), Japanese footballer
- Kenji Kaido (海道 賢仁; born 1969), Japanese producer of Sony Interactive Entertainment's
- Kenji Kamiyama (神山 健治; born 1966), Japanese anime director
- Kenji Kanasugi (金杉 憲治; born 1959), current Japanese ambassador to China
- Kenji Kaneyasu (金康 健司; born 1954), Japanese rower
- Kenji Kanō (嘉納 健治; 1881–1947), Japanese yakuza and boxing and mixed martial arts promoter
- Kenji Kanzaki (神崎 健二; born 1963), Japanese shogi player
- Kenji Kasahara (笠原 健治; born 1975), Japanese entrepreneur
- Kenji Kasai (笠井 賢二), Japanese table tennis player
- Kenji Katsube (勝部 賢志; born 1959), Japanese politician
- Kenji Kawaguchi (川口 健次; born 1968), Japanese mixed martial artist
- Kenji Kawai (川井 憲次; born 1957), Japanese music composer and arranger
- Kenji Kawakami (川上 賢司; born 1946), Japanese inventor of the Chindōgu
- Kenji Kazama (風間 健; born 1943), Japanese martial artist and actor
- Kenji Kikawada (黄川田 賢司; born 1974), Japanese former football player
- Kenji Kimihara (君原 健二; born 1941), Japanese retired long-distance runner
- Kenji Kimura (木村 憲治; born 1945), Japanese volleyball player
- Kenji Kitahashi (北橋 健治; born 1953), Japanese politician
- Kenji Kitawaki (北脇 健慈; born 1991), Japanese footballer
- Kenji Kitazato (北里 謙治; born 1989), Japanese field hockey player
- Kenji Kobase (小長谷 研二; born 1987), Japanese swimmer
- Kenji Kobayashi (小林 健二; born 1957), Japanese shogi player
- Kenji Kodama (こだま 兼嗣; born 1949), Japanese anime director, and storyboard artist
- Kenji Komata (古俣 健次; born 1964), Japanese former football player
- Kenji Kosaka (politician) (小坂 憲次; 1946–2016), Japanese politician
- Kenji Kosaka (psychiatrist) (小阪 憲司; 1939–2023), Japanese psychiatrist
- Kenji Koyama (小山 健二; born 1972), Japanese former football player
- Kenji Koyano (小谷野 顕治; born 1988), Japanese football player
- Kenji Kubo (久保 賢司; born 1989), Japanese kickboxer and former professional boxer
- Kenji Kurosaki (黒崎 健時; born 1930), Japanese martial arts instructor
- Kenji M. Price (born 1980), American lawyer
- Kenji Manabe (真鍋 賢二; 1935–2024), Japanese pathologist and politician
- Kenji Maruyama (丸山 健二; born 1943), Japanese author
- Kenji Maruyama (judoka) (丸山 顕志; born 1965), Japanese former judoka
- Kenji Matsuda (松田 賢二; born 1971), Japanese actor
- Kenji Matsudaira (松平 賢二; born 1989), Japanese table tennis player
- Kenji Mboma Dem (born 2002) French professional footballer
- Kenji Midori (緑 健児; born 1962), Japanese martial artist and an instructor
- Kenji Misumi (三隅 研次; 1921–1975), Japanese film director
- Kenji Miyamoto (figure skater) (宮本 賢二; born 1978), Japanese figure skating choreographer, coach, and former competitive ice dancer
- Kenji Miyamoto (politician) (宮本 顕治; 1908–2007), Japanese communist politician
- Kenji Miyazaki (宮崎 健治; born 1977), Japanese former football player
- Kenji Miyazawa (宮沢 賢治; 1896–1933), Japanese novelist, poet, and children's literature writer
- Kenji Mizoguchi (溝口 健二; 1898–1956), Japanese filmmaker
- Kenji Mizuhashi (水橋 研二; born 1975), Japanese actor
- Kenji Momota (桃田 健史; born 1962), Japanese racing announcer, racing commentator and former driver
- Kenji Morimoto (born 1975), Japanese equestrian
- Kenji Moriwaki (森脇 健児; born 1967), Japanese comedian and radio personality
- Kenji Morozumi (諸積 兼司; born 1969), Japanese former Nippon Professional Baseball outfielder
- Kenji Nagai (長井 健司; 1957–2007), Japanese photojournalist
- Kenji Nagasaki (長崎 健司; born 1972), Japanese anime director
- Kenji Nakada (仲田 建二; born 1973), Japanese football manager and former player
- Kenji Nakagami (中上 健次; 1946–1992), Japanese writer, critic, and poet
- Kenji Nakamura (中村 健治; born 1970), Japanese anime director
- Kenji Nakamura (sailor) (中村 健次; born 1964), Japanese sailor
- Kenji Nakanishi (中西 健治; born 1964), Japanese politician
- Kenji Nanri (南里 研二; born 1992), Japanese sailor
- Kenji Narisako (成迫 健児; born 1984), Japanese hurdler
- Kenji Nener (ニナー 賢治; born 1993), Japanese triathlete
- Kenji Nishimaki (西巻 賢二; born 1999), Japanese professional baseball player
- Kenji Nishioka (西岡 健二; born 2001), Japanese hurdler
- Kenji Nojima (野島 健児; born 1976), Japanese voice actor and singer
- Kenji Nomura (乃村 健次; born 1970), Japanese voice actor
- Kenji Oba (大場 健史; born 1967), Japanese footballer
- Kenji Ogiwara (荻原 健司; born 1969), Japanese politician and former Nordic combined skier
- Kenji Ogiya (扇谷 健司; born 1971), Japanese association football referee
- Kenji Ogusu (小楠 健志; born 1971), Japanese retired mixed martial artist
- Kenji Ohba (大葉 健二; 1955–2026), Japanese actor and stuntman
- Kenji Ohmori (大森 賢治; born 1962), Japanese physicist and chemist
- Kenji Ohtsuki (大槻 賢二; born 1966), Japanese rock musician and Seiun Award-winning writer
- Kenji Oiwa (大岩 ケンヂ; born 1978), Japanese manga artist
- Kenji Okabe (岡部 健二; 1915-1943), Japanese ace fighter pilot in the Imperial Japanese Navy
- Kenji Okamura (岡村 憲司; born 1973), Japanese Supervising coach
- Kenji Onitake (鬼武 健二; born 1939), Japanese former footballer
- Kenji Onuma (大沼 賢治; born 1931), Japanese retired lightweight weightlifter
- Kenji Osawa (大沢 ケンジ; born 1976), Japanese retired mixed martial artist
- Kenji Oshiba (大柴 健二; born 1973), Japanese former football player
- Kenji Otonari (大隣 憲司; born 1984), Japanese former baseball pitcher
- Kenji Otsubo (大坪 賢次; born 1944), Japanese businessman
- Kenji Ozawa (小沢 健二; born 1968), Japanese musician, designer and writer
- Kenji Roa (ロア 健治; born 1979), Japanese voice actor and singer
- Kenji Sahara (佐原 健二; born 1932), Japanese actor
- Kenji Sakaguchi (坂口 憲二; born 1975), Japanese actor
- Kenji Satake (佐竹 健治; born 1958), Japanese seismologist
- Kenji Sato (baseball) (佐藤 賢治; born 1988), Japanese baseball player
- Kenji Sato (basketball) (佐藤 賢次; born 1979), Japanese basketball player and coach
- Kenji Sawada (沢田 研二; born 1948), Japanese singer, songwriter and actor
- Kenji Sekido (関戸 健二; born 1990), Japanese former footballer
- Kenji Shimaoka (嶋岡 健治; born 1949), Japanese volleyball player
- Kenji Shimizu (清水 健二; born 1940), Japanese aikido teacher
- Kenji Soda (宗田 研二; born 1948), Japanese basketball player
- Kenji Suda (須田 健仁; born 1966), Japanese former ski jumper
- Kenji Sugimura (杉村 憲司; born 1953), Japanese architect and patent attorney
- Kenji Suzuki (announcer) (鈴木 健二; 1929–2024), Japanese freelancer moderator and former television announcer
- Kenji Suzuki (director) (鈴木 健二; born 1957), Japanese special effects director
- Kenji Suzuki (footballer) (鈴木 健児; born 1986), Japanese retired football player
- Kenji Syed Rusydi (born 1998), Singaporean professional footballer
- Kenji Tabata (田端 健児; born 1974), Japanese retired sprinter
- Kenji Tago (多胡 謙治; 1895–1951), Japanese dentist and educator
- Kenji Takagi (高木 憲次; 1888–1963), Japanese orthopedic surgeon
- Kenji Takagi (footballer) (高木 健旨; born 1976), Japanese former football player
- Kenji Takahashi (footballer, born 1970) (高橋 健二), Japanese footballer
- Kenji Takahashi (footballer, born 1985) (髙橋 健史), Japanese footballer
- Kenji Takahashi (racing driver)高橋 健二 (1946–2005), Japanese racing driver
- Kenji Takahashi (sailor) (高橋 賢次; born 1982), Japanese sailor
- Kenji Takaki (1894–1984), Japanese merchant seaman and actor
- Kenji Takama (高間 賢治; born 1949), Japanese cinematographer
- Kenji Takao (高尾 憲司; born 1975), Japanese running coach and former long-distance runner
- Kenji Takenaka (竹中 健司; born 1970), Japanese woodblock print artist and the fifth-generation printer
- Kenji Takeya (竹谷 賢二; born 1969), Japanese cyclist
- Kenji Tamamura (玉村 健次; born 1961), Japanese former handball player
- Kenji Tamura (田村 謙治; born 1968), Japanese former politician
- Kenji Tanigaki (谷垣 健治; born 1970), Japanese action choreographer, stunt performer, and film director
- Kenji Terada (寺田 憲史; born 1952), Japanese scenario writer, anime director, series organizer and novelist
- Kenji Tochio (橡尾 健次; born 1941), Japanese former football player
- Kenji Tohira (都平 健二; 1941–2024), Japanese racing driver
- Kenji Tokitsu (時津 賢児; born 1947), Japanese author and martial artist
- Kenji Tomabechi (苫米地 賢司; born 1978), Japanese curler
- Kenji Tomashino (笘篠 賢治; born 1966), Japanese former Nippon Professional Baseball infielder/outfielder
- Kenji Tomiki (富木 謙治; 1900–1979), Japanese martial artist
- Kenji Tominaga (富永 研司; born 1970), Japanese actor
- Kenji Tomita (富田 健治; 1897–1977), Japanese politician
- Kenji Tomura (戸村 健次; born 1987), Japanese professional baseball pitcher
- Kenji Toriyabe (鳥谷部 健司; born 1943), Japanese ice hockey player
- Kenji Treschuk (born 1982), American soccer defender
- Kenji Tsuchiya (土屋 健二; born 1990), Japanese professional baseball player
- Kenji Tsukagoshi (塚越 賢爾; 1900–1943), Japanese aviator and explorer
- Kenji Tsumura (津村 健志; born 1986), Japanese professional Magic: The Gathering player
- Kenji Tsuruta (鶴田 謙二; born 1961), Japanese manga artist and illustrator
- Kenji Uchida (内田 健二; born 1953), Japanese anime producer
- Kenji Uchida (film director) (内田 けんじ; born 1972), Japanese film director
- Kenji Uchino (born 1950), American electronics engineer, physicist, academic, inventor and industry executive
- Kenji Ueda (上田 ケンジ; born 1965), Japanese rock musician and producer
- Kenji Uematsu (born 1976), Spanish judoka
- Kenji Ueno (上野 健爾; born 1945), Japanese mathematician
- Kenji Urada (1944–1981), Japanese factory worker
- Kenji Urai (浦井 健治; born 1981), Japanese actor and singer
- Kenji Utsumi (内海 賢二; 1937–2013), Japanese actor and voice actor
- Kenji Utsunomiya (宇都宮 健児; born 1946), Japanese lawyer and former chair
- Kenji Wakamiya (若宮 健嗣; born 1961), Japanese politician
- Kenji Waki (脇 謙二; born 1960), Japanese retired professional shogi player
- Kenji Watanabe (渡辺 健司; 1969–2017), Japanese breaststroke swimmer
- Kenji Watanabe (scientist) (渡邊 賢司; born 1962), Japanese material scientist
- Kenji Williams, American filmmaker, electronic music producer, and violinist
- Kenji Wu (born 1979), Taiwanese singer and actor
- Kenji Yahata (八幡 賢司; born 1980), Japanese retired hurdler
- Kenji Yamada (basketball) (山田 謙治; born 1983), Japanese former professional basketball player
- Kenji Yamada (footballer) (山田 賢二; born 1989), Japanese former footballer
- Kenji Yamada (judoka) (1924–2014), Japanese competitive judoka
- Kenji Yamada (politician) (山田 賢司; born 1966), Japanese politician
- Kenji Yamada (producer) (山田 兼司; born 1979), Japanese film and television producer
- Kenji Yamamoto (composer, born 1958) (山本 健司; born 1958), Japanese composer and arranger
- Kenji Yamamoto (composer, born 1964) (山本 健誌; born 1958), Japanese video game musician
- Kenji Yamamoto (footballer) (山本 健二; born 1965), Japanese former football player
- Kenji Yamane (山根 謙二; born 1967), Japanese former Head coach of the Saitama Broncos
- Kenji Yamaoka (山岡 賢次; born 1943), Japanese former politician
- Kenji Yamauchi (山内 健次; born 1964), Japanese sprinter
- Kenji Yanagiya (柳谷 謙治; 1919–2008), Japanese member of the Imperial Japanese Navy
- Kenji Yano (矢野 謙次; born 1980), Japanese former professional baseball outfielder
- Kenji Yanobe (ヤノベケンジ; born 1965), Japanese contemporary artist
- Kenji Yonekura (米倉 健司; 1934–2023), Japanese boxer
- Kenji Yoshida (吉田 健二; born 1935), Japanese anime producer and illustrator
- Kenji Yoshino (born 1969), American legal scholar
- Kenji Yoshitsuru (吉鶴 憲治; born 1971), Japanese former Nippon Professional Baseball catcher
- Allen Kenji Ono (小野 健次, 1933 – 2016), American general
- James Kenji López-Alt (born 1979), American chef and food writer
- Michael Kenji Shinoda (篠田 賢治, born 1977), American musician
- Kaique Kenji (born 2006), Brazilian footballer
- Patrick Kenji Takahashi (born 1940), American biochemical engineer and science writer

== Fictional characters ==
- Kenji Asuka (明日香 健二), the Green Ranger of Himitsu Sentai Gorenger
- Kenji Delos Reyes from the Filipino novel She's Dating the Gangster
- Kenji Endō (健児), the protagonist in the manga series 20th Century Boys
- Kenji Harima (拳児), the main character from the manga and anime series School Rumble
- Kenji Himura (剣路) in the manga series Rurouni Kenshin
- Kenji Kasen, a yakuza boss in Grand Theft Auto III
- Kenji Kon from Jurassic World Camp Cretaceous
- Kenji Lee, Inspector Lee's brother in Rush Hour 3
- Kenji Miyazawa, from anime and manga series Bungo Stray Dogs
- Kenji Muto in the fantasy novel series Tales of the Otori
- Kenji Ookami, Tooey's father of Japanese descent in Molly of Denali
- Kenji Sato, from Ultraman: Rising Netflix 2024
- Kenji Setou, a legally blind character in Katawa Shoujo
- Kenji Tomochika in the game Shin Megami Tensei: Persona 3
- Kenji Tsukino (謙之), a minor character in Sailor Moon media
- Kenji Uedo, Marvel Comics character also known as Zero
- Kenji Yamaguchi from the anime and manga My Little Monster
- Karate Kenji, the main character from the manga and anime series Fight Fever
- Kenji in the real-time strategy game Battle Realms
- Kenji, the main character in the 2003 Thai film Last Life in the Universe
- Kenji, a character in the video game Need for Speed: Carbon
- Kenji, Dragonfly Jones' student/rival in the TV show Martin
- Kenji in the video game Red Earth

== See also ==
- Kenji (disambiguation)
- Kenji Mizoguchi: The Life of a Film Director, a 1975 Japanese documentary film
- 健次 (disambiguation)
- 賢治 (disambiguation)
