= Ken'ichi =

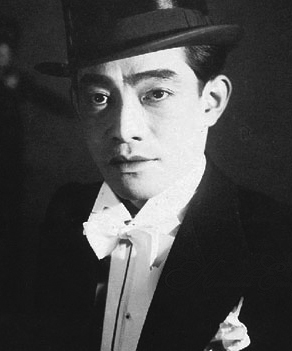
- Ken'ichi Enomoto, a singing comedian
- Gender: Male

Origin
- Origin: Japanese
- Meaning: Different depending on the kanji

Other names
- Related names: Ken, Kenji, Kenzō, Jun'ichi, Shin'ichi

Ken'ichi or Kenichi (Japanese: けんいち, ケンイチ; pronounced [keɰ̃.i.tɕi]) is a masculine Japanese given name.

== Written forms ==
Ken'ichi can be written using different kanji characters and can mean:

- 賢一, "wise, one"
- 健一, "healthy, one"
- 憲一, "constitution, one"
- 謙一, "humble, one"
- 建一, "build, one"
- 研一, "polish, one"
- 兼一, "concurrently, one"

The name can also be written in hiragana or katakana.

== People with the name ==
- Kenichi Abe (阿部 健市; born 1923, death date unknown), Japanese World War II flying ace
- Ken'ichi Chen (建一, born 1956), Japanese chef and restaurateur
- Kenichi Ego (賢一, born 1979), Japanese football player
- Kenichi Endō (憲一, born 1961), Japanese actor
- Ken'ichi Enomoto (健一, 1904–1970), Japanese singing comedian
- Kenichi Fukui (謙一, 1918–1998), Japanese chemist
- Kenichi Furuya (古屋 健一; 1912–1988), Japanese ice hockey player
- Ken'ichi Kasai (ケンイチ, born 1970), Japanese anime director
- Keni'chi Kōbō (賢一, born 1973), former sumo wrestler
- Kenichi Konishi (健一, born 1909), Japanese field hockey player
- Kenichi Hagiwara (健一, born 1950), Japanese actor and lead singer
- Kenichi Horie (謙一, born 1938), Japanese solo yachtsman
- Kenichi Ikezoe (謙一, born 1979), Japanese jockey
- Kenichi Kaga (健一, born 1983), Japanese footballer for Júbilo Iwata
- Ken-ichi Kimura (architect) (木村 建一; born 1933), Japanese architect
- Kenichi Kimura (rugby union) (木村 賢一; born 1968), Japanese rugby union player
- Kenichi Konishi (小西 健一; born 1909), Japanese field hockey player
- Kenichi Kuboya (健一, born 1972), Japanese golfer
- Kenichi Matsuoka (松岡 健一, born 1982), Japanese baseball player
- Kenichi Matsuyama (ケンイチ, born 1985), Japanese actor
- Kenichi Mikawa (憲一, born 1946), Japanese singer
- Ken'ichi Mishima (三島 健一; born 1942), Japanese philosopher
- Kenichi Mizuno (賢一, born 1966), Japanese politician
- Kenichi Momoyama (虔一, 1909–1990), first son of Prince Ui of Korea by Lady Jeong
- Kenichi Mori (賢一, born 1984), Japanese footballer for Mito HollyHock
- Luke Kenichi Muto (謙一), Japanese Anglican bishop
- Kenichi Nishi (健一, born 1967), Japanese video game designer
- Kenichi Ogata (voice actor) (賢一, born 1942), Japanese voice actor
- Kenichi Ogawa (堅一, born 1988), Japanese boxer
- Kenichi Ono (健一, born 1958), Japanese voice actor and actor
- Kenichi Ohmae (研一, born 1943), Japanese business and corporate strategist
- Kenichi Okada (健一, born 1980), rhythm guitarist of Japanese band MERRY (previously CRESCENT and Syndrome)
- Kenichi Sasaki (佐々木 健一; born 1950), Japanese handball player
- Kenichi Shimokawa (健一, born 1970), Japanese football goalkeeper
- Kenichi Shinoda (建市, born 1942), Japanese yakuza boss of Yamaguchi-gumi
- Kenichi Sone (曽根 健一; c. 1909–1946), Japanese internment camp commander and war criminal
- Kenichi Sonoda (健一, born 1962), manga artist and anime character designer
- Kenichi Suzuki (disambiguation), multiple people
- Kenichi Suzumura (健一, born 1974), Japanese voice actor
- Kenichi Tago (健一, born 1989), Japanese professional badminton player
- Kenichi Takahashi (健一, born 1973), Japanese long-distance runner
- Ken-ichi Ueda (植田 憲一, born 1946), Japanese scientist
- Kenichi Uemura (健一, born 1974), Japanese football player
- Kenichi Umezawa (梅沢 賢一; born 1957), Japanese fencer
- Kenichi Yamada (山田 健一; born 1947), Japanese golfer
- Kenichi Yamakawa (健一, born 1953), Japanese author and rock musician
- Kenichi Yamamoto (yakuza) (健一, 1925–1982), founder of the Yamaken-gumi yakuza gang
- Ken'ichi Yoshida (literary scholar) (健一, 1912–1977), Japanese author and literary critic
- Kenichi Yoshida (animator) (健一, born 1969), Japanese animator and character designer
- Kenichi Yumoto (健一, born 1984), Japanese freestyle wrestler

== Fictional characters ==
- Kenichi (ケンイチ), the main character of the 2001 anime film Metropolis
- Kenichi Shirahama (兼一), the main character of the manga series Kenichi: The Mightiest Disciple
- Kenichi Mitsuba (三葉ケン一), a character from Ninja Hattori-kun franchise.
- Kenichi Natsuki (菜月賢一), a character from Re:Zero - Starting Life in Another World

== See also ==
- Chief Detective Kenichi, a manga series by Osamu Tezuka
- Kenichi Yamamoto (disambiguation)
