= 12th Air Group =

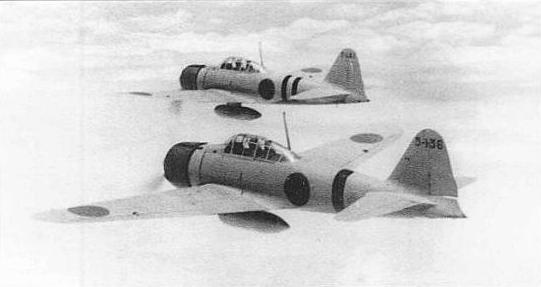
- 12th Air Group Zeros over the Chinese airspace in May 1941.
- Active: 11 July 1937 – 15 November 1941
- Country: Empire of Japan
- Branch: (Empire of Japan) Imperial Japanese Navy
- Type: Naval aviation unit
- Role: Multi-role (until March 1938); Fighter (from March 1938)
- Garrison/HQ: Zhoushuizi; Nanking; Anqing; Hankou
- Aircraft flown: Mitsubishi A6M Zero; Mitsubishi A5M; Nakajima A4N; Aichi D1A; Kugisho B3Y
- Engagements: World War II: Second Sino-Japanese War

The 12th Navy Air Group (第十二海軍航空隊, Dai-jūni Kaigun Kōkūtai) was a unit of the Imperial Japanese Navy Air Service (IJNAS) during the Second Sino-Japanese War that operated mainly in the campaigns in Central China.

== History ==
The unit was formed on 11 July 1937 at the beginning of the Second Sino-Japanese War. It was initially a mixed-role unit equipped with 12 Nakajima A4N fighters, 12 Aichi D1A dive bombers and 12 Kugisho B3Y torpedo bombers. In August it moved to Zhoushuizi airfield at Dalian and in September to Kunda airfield near Shanghai. Between October and November, it converted to new Mitsubishi A5M fighters. After the capture of Nanking the unit moved to Dajiaochang airfield at Nanking, where it conducted missions against Nanchang and Hankou.

In March 1938, it was designated as a fighter-only unit and assimilated fighters from the 13th Air Group, which in turn became a medium-bomber unit. The strength of the 12th Air Group then became 30 A5M fighters. On 29 April, while operating from Anqing and escorting medium bombers to Hankou, the unit's pilots claimed 30 Chinese aircraft shot down and seven more probables. Attacks on Hankou continued until July, during which the unit claimed 100 aircraft destroyed and 12 probables for the loss of five fighters.

After the capture of Hankou, the unit transferred to an airbase near Hankou. Nevertheless, due to the lack of range to escort the medium bombers into inland China, they did not see much action. This changed in the summer of 1940 when the first batch of new Mitsubishi A6M Zero fighters arrived in the China theater. On 13 September, 13 Zeros led by Lieutenant Saburō Shindō engaged 30 Chinese fighters in a dogfight and claimed 27 of them shot down. From then until the summer of 1941, the 12th Air Group in Central China and the 14th Air Group in South China made a combined claim of 103 aircraft shot down and further 163 destroyed on the ground for the loss of three aircraft. Both naval units were disbanded on 15 September 1941, which left air operations in China entirely to Imperial Japanese Army Air Service (IJAAS).

The unit at some point or another included many future fighter aces, like Tetsuzō Iwamoto, Saburo Sakai, Ayao Shirane, Tadashi Kaneko, Shigetaka Ōmori, Kaname Harada, Kenji Okabe and Akira Yamamoto. In addition, many prominent bomber pilots and aircrew also served with the unit, such as Shigeharu Murata, Sadamu Takahashi, Kiyoto Furuta, Keiichi Arima and Jūzō Mori.
