= Mishima (disambiguation) =

Yukio Mishima (1925–1970) was a Japanese writer.

Mishima may also refer to:

== Places ==
- Mishima, Shizuoka, a city in Shizuoka Prefecture, Japan
- Mishima District, Osaka, a district in Osaka Prefecture, Japan
- Mishima, Fukushima, a town in Fukushima Prefecture, Japan
- Mishima, Niigata, a town in Niigata Prefecture, Japan
- Mishima, Kagoshima, a village in Kagoshima Prefecture, Japan
- Mishima Island, Yamaguchi, an island in Yamaguchi Prefecture, Japan
  - Mishima cattle, an endangered cattle breed found on the island

== Media ==
- Mishima: A Life in Four Chapters, a 1985 biographical drama film about Yukio Mishima directed by Paul Schrader
  - Mishima: A Life in Four Chapters (soundtrack), composed by Philip Glass and performed by the Kronos Quartet
- Mishima: A Vision of the Void, a book about Yukio Mishima by Marguerite Yourcenar
- Mishima (band), a Catalan indie pop band
- Mishima Zaibatsu, a fictional company in the Tekken franchise
- Mishima, a megacorporation in the role-playing game Mutant Chronicles

== Other uses ==
- Mishima (surname), a Japanese surname
- Japanese battleship Mishima
- Mishima ware, a style of ceramic pottery
