= Omori =

Ōmori or Omori may refer to:

== Places ==
- Ōmori, a district in Tokyo, Japan
- Ōmori, Akita, a former town in Hiraka District, Akita Prefecture, Japan
- Ōmori Station (disambiguation), multiple railway stations in Japan
- Omori, New Zealand is a rural settlement in New Zealand

== Other uses ==
- Ōmori (surname), a Japanese surname
- Omori (video game), a 2020 role-playing video game
