= 健次 =

健次, meaning 'health, times', may refer to:

- Jianci, masculine Chinese given name
  - Tan Jianci (born 1990), Chinese actor, singer, and dancer
- Kenji, masculine Japanese given name

== See also ==
- Kenji (disambiguation)
