= Morozumi =

Morozumi (written: 両角) is a Japanese surname. Notable people with the surname include:

- Gyosaku Morozumi (両角 業作; 1884–1963), Japanese general
- Kenji Morozumi ((諸積 兼司; born 1969), Japanese baseball player
- Kosuke Morozumi (両角 公佑; born 1988), Japanese curler
- Torasada Morozumi (諸角昌清; died 1561), Japanese samurai
- Yusuke Morozumi (両角 友佑; born 1985), Japanese curler

== See also ==
- Morozumi Range, a mountain range of Antarctica
