= Mishima (surname) =

- Pronunciation: Japanese: [miɕima]

Origin
- Origin: Japanese
- Region of origin: Japanese

Mishima (written: 三島 or 三嶋) is a Japanese surname. Notable people with the surname include:

- Dokonjonosuke Mishima (born 1972), Japanese mixed martial artist
- Ken'ichi Mishima (三島 健一; born 1942), Japanese philosopher
- Kohei Mishima (三島 康平; born 1987), Japanese footballer
- Mishima Michitsune (1835–1888), viscount and statesman of the Tokugawa shogunate
- Michiharu Mishima (1897–1965), viscount of the Scout Association of Japan, Chief Scout of Japan
- Shohei Mishima (三島 頌平; born 1995), Japanese footballer
- Sumie Mishima (1900–1992), Japanese writer, translator, educator
- Yukio Mishima (1925–1970), the penname of Kimitake Hiraoka, a Japanese novelist and playwright

== Fictional characters ==
- Heihachi Mishima, a Tekken character
- Jinpachi Mishima, a Tekken character
- Kazumi Mishima, a Tekken character
- Kazuya Mishima, a Tekken character
