= Jūzō Mori =

Japanese air ace

- 森 拾三
- Born: 9 February 1917; Saitama Prefecture, Empire of Japan
- Military career
- Allegiance: Empire of Japan
- Branch: Imperial Japanese Navy Air Service (IJN)
- Rank: Petty Officer
- Units: 12th Air Group; Sōryū; Jun'yō
- Conflicts: Second Sino-Japanese War; World War II; Attack on Pearl Harbor; Indian Ocean Raid; Battle of Midway; Solomon Islands Campaign

Jūzō Mori (森 拾三, Mori Jūzō; born 9 February 1917) was a torpedo bomber pilot in the Imperial Japanese Navy (IJN) during World War II. He flew Nakajima B5N torpedo bomber from the carrier Sōryū during the Attack on Pearl Harbor, the Indian Ocean Raid and the Battle of Midway. He is most notable for having released the torpedo that eventually sank the battleship California during the Attack on Pearl Harbor. He was shot down and lost his right hand during the Solomon Islands Campaign while flying from the carrier Jun'yō, but survived the crash and was eventually evacuated to Japan.

== Early career ==
Jūzō Mori was born in on 9 February 1917 in a small town in Saitama Prefecture to a poor farmer family. He wanted to become a teacher but the family could not afford the entrance fee for the school. He then moved to Tokyo to live with his uncle. He found him a job in the department store, while at the same time he attended a night school. However, in January 1935 his father died and he was forced to return to his home town in order to support the family. In August he noticed a navy recruiting poster and decided to join the Imperial Japanese Navy. He passed the entrance test in January 1936 but almost failed the physical exam as his chest measurement was too small. He enlisted in the navy as a pilot and in June left for Yokosuka naval base to start the basic training. In November he transferred to Kasumigaura Training Naval Air Station (NAS) near Tokyo to begin pilot training. He graduated from the 38th class in 1938 and specialized in torpedo bombing.

In April 1938, Mori was assigned to the 12th Air Group based near Nanjing in Central China. He flew Aichi D1A bomber and participated in various operations along the Yangtze River. In September, the unit transitioned to the new Nakajima B5N bombers. During one of the September missions near Jiujiang, Mori experienced an engine failure in the new aircraft and was forced to land in a nearby field controlled by the Imperial Japanese Army (IJA). In November, while flying a mission from Hankou, his B5N ran out of fuel due to a problem and he again was forced to land in a field near the Yangtze River. This time he and his crew ended up in enemy territory but they were rescued the next day. He left China in December 1938 and in January 1939 he was transferred back to Kasumigaura NAS to serve as an instructor. In May he was promoted to Petty Officer Third Class.

In September 1941 he was transferred to the carrier Sōryū and started the training in preparation for the Attack on Pearl Harbor.

== Pacific War ==
During the Attack on Pearl Harbor, Petty Officer Mori was part of the first wave. As his division of Nakajima B5N torpedo bombers reached the harbor they lined up to attack the United States Navy (USN) battleship row. However, his division leader lined them up on a cruiser instead of a battleship. Mori realized the error before releasing the torpedo and went around for another pass, which most likely made it the only Japanese torpedo plane that made the attack run twice. He then lined up on the battleship California and hit it with his torpedo. This caused the ship to sink in the harbor.

Petty Officer Mori was not directly involved in the Attack on Darwin since he was assigned to patrol duty in the vicinity of IJN carriers.

On the return journey from Pearl Harbor, the Second Carrier Division (consisting of carriers Hiryū and Sōryū) was detached to assist in capturing of Wake Island. On 22 December, Petty Officer Mori and his group of B5N level bombers attacked artillery emplacements and fortifications on the island. The next day, they flew again to support the landings on the islands. When he arrived over the island, the garrison had apparently already surrendered, as he noticed the white flag flying above their headquarters. However, while flying around the islands, a rogue AA emplacement opened fire and hit his fuel tank. Infuriated about it, he considered dropping his remaining bombs on their position, however, he decided not to risk running out of fuel and returned to the IJN fleet instead.

In April 1942, Petty Officer Mori participated in Indian Ocean Raid. He was not directly involved in actions on 5 April as he was part of a reserve force waiting on the carriers. However, on 9 April he was part of a strike against Trincomalee military harbor on Ceylon. His B5N was equipped with an 800-kilogram bomb and his division performed a low-level bombing attack on the harbor installation. On their way back, they encountered a Supermarine Spitfire and evaded it by hiding in a cloud before safely returning to the carrier.

During the Battle of Midway on 4 June 1942, Petty Officer Mori was part of the strike force against the USN airfield and installations on Midway Atoll. His B5N was equipped with an 800-kilogram bomb for the level bombing. On the way to the atoll, they were intercepted by a large group of Midway-based Marine fighters (six Grumman F4F Wildcats and 20 Brewster F2A Buffalos) led by Major Floyd B. Parks. His aircraft was attacked by the Marine fighters, however the escorting Mitsubishi A6M Zeros drove them away. Mori and his division of six level bombers attacked the Midway airfield. Four bombs landed and detonated on the runway, while two of them missed and hit the forest nearby. However, those two bombs appeared to have hit an AA emplacement and ammo depot, since they caused a series of secondary explosions. After the attack he headed back to the IJN fleet where he witnessed the unsuccessful attack on IJN carriers by the Midway-based Boeing B-17 Flying Fortress high-altitude bombers on Hiryū and Douglas TBD Devastator torpedo bombers on Sōryū. He landed on Sōryū, which was preparing its Aichi D3A dive bombers for a strike against the USN carrier detected in the North-East. However, before the preparation could be finished, Sōryū was hit and set ablaze by three bombs dropped by dive bombers of Yorktown led by Lieutenant Commander Max Leslie. Mori was in the ready room at the time of the attack and had to fight through the smoke and fire to reach the deck of the carrier. As the fires intensified, he had to jump 60 feet from the deck into the sea and was eventually picked up by the destroyer Makigumo.

After the Battle of Midway, Petty Officer Mori was transferred to the new carrier Jun'yō, which sailed from Japan to Guadalcanal in early October 1942. On 16 October, He participated in the hastily organized and ill-fated air strike to attack the enemy position around Lunga Point on Guadalcanal. The strike consisted of 18 B5N bombers (equipped with 800-kilogram bombs) and 18 Zero fighters, under overall command of Lieutenant Commander Yoshio Shiga. Hiyō bombers were led by Lieutenant Yoshiaki Irikiin, while Jun'yō bombers were led by inexperienced Lieutenant Tadao Itō. As they approached Lunga Point, Itō broke off the bombing run of the entire Jun'yō group in order to make another attempt, which infuriated Mori. During the second attempt, the group was ambushed by numerous Wildcat fighters from Henderson Field. In the attack three Hiyō bombers were shot down and three were damaged, while six Jun'yō bombers were shot down and two were damaged. The escorting Zeros claimed several Wildcats, however Hiyō ace Kaname Harada was wounded and had to ditch at Rekata Bay. Petty Officer Mori lost his right hand and was forced to ditch his bomber in the water near Cape Esperance, which was held by IJA. He then endured starvation on Guadalcanal before being evacuated to Truk in November.

== Later life ==
As a result of the injury, Mori was discharged from the navy and survived the war. He later opened a bar near Nishi-Ogikubo Station in Tokyo, where he also worked as a bartender.
