= Kenzo =

Kenzo may refer to:

- Kenzō, a Japanese masculine given name (includes a list of people with the name)
- Kenzo (brand), a French luxury fashion house
- Kenzo (restaurant), a Japanese restaurant in Napa, California
- 5526 Kenzo, a main-belt asteroid
