= Ōmori (surname) =

Ōmori, Omori, Oomori or Ohmori (written: 大森 lit. "big forest") is a Japanese surname. Notable people with the surname include:

- Akari Omori (大森朱莉; born 2002), Japanese judoka
- Fusakichi Omori (大森 房吉; 1868–1923), Japanese seismologist
- Ōmori Harutoyo (大森 治豊; 1852–1912), Japanese surgeon
- Hiroki Omori (大森 啓生; born 1990), Japanese footballer
- Hokuto Omori (大森北斗; born 1995), Japanese professional wrestler
- Hyozo Omori (大森 兵蔵; 1876–1913), Japanese physical education specialist
- Kazuki Ōmori (大森 一樹; 1952–2022), Japanese film director and screenwriter
- Kenji Ohmori (大森 賢治; born 1962), Japanese physicist and chemist
- Kensaku Omori (大森 健作; born 1975), Japanese footballer
- Kotaro Omori (大森 晃太郎; born 1992), Japanese footballer
- Masayuki Omori (大森 征之; born 1976), Japanese footballer
- Nao Ōmori (大森 南朋; born 1972), Japanese actor
- Nichika Ōmori (大森 日雅; born 1994), Japanese voice actress
- Reiko Ōmori (大森 玲子; born 1982), Japanese voice actress, idol and singer
- Sentarō Ōmori (大森 仙太郎; 1892–1974), Imperial Japanese Navy admiral
- Shigekazu Ōmori (大森 盛一; born 1972), Japanese sprinter
- Shigenori Omori (大森 重宜; born 1960), Japanese sprinter
- Shigetaka Ōmori (大森 茂高; 1916–1942), Japanese World War II flying ace
- Shotaro Omori (born 1995), American figure skater
- Omori Sogen (大森 曹玄; 1904–1994), Japanese Zen Buddhist
- Takahiro Omori (大森 貴弘; born 1965), Japanese animator and anime director
- Takao Omori (大森 隆男; born 1969), Japanese professional wrestler
- Tatsushi Ōmori (大森 立嗣; born 1970), Japanese film director and actor
