= Kenzi =

Kenzi may refer to:

- Abdelhani Kenzi, an Algerian boxer
- The Kenzi language, a Nubian language spoken in southern Egypt
- Mackenzie "Kenzi" Malikov, a character in the 2010s TV series Lost Girl

== See also ==
- Kenji ("Kenzi" is the Kunrei-shiki spelling for Kenji)
