= Genji =

Genji may refer to:

== General ==
- Genji (era), an era in Japanese history (1864–65)
- Genji (woreda), a district of the Oromia Region, Ethiopia
- Genji, an alternative name for the Minamoto clan

== People ==
- Genji Hashimoto (橋本 元次; born 1965), Japanese businessman
- Genji Kaku (佳久 源治; born 1956), Taiwanese former professional baseball player
- Genji Kuniyoshi (国吉 源次; 1930–2021), Japanese singer
- Genji Matsuda (松田 源治; 1876–1936), Japanese politician and cabinet minister
- Genji Umeno (梅野 源治; born 1988), Japanese wrestler

== Fictional characters ==
- Genji (Overwatch), a player character in the video games Overwatch and Heroes of the Storm
- Genji Midorikawa, a character from Smile PreCure!
- Hikaru Genji, the main character of the 11th-century Japanese text The Tale of Genji
- Kaoru Genji, is a fictional character in The Tale of Genji

== Medias ==
- Genji Monogatari (manga), is a Japanese manga
- Genji monogatari (opera), is an opera
- Genji Monogatari Emaki, is a handscroll of the Japanese literature classic The Tale of Genji
- Genji Monogatari Sennenki, is a Japanese anime
- Genji Monogatari: Sennen no Nazo, is a 2011 Japanese film

== Video games ==
- Genji: Dawn of the Samurai, a PlayStation 2 video game
- Genji: Days of the Blade, a PlayStation 3 video game

== Others ==
- Seiwa Genji, is a line of the Japanese Minamoto clan
- Uda Genji, were the successful and powerful line of a Japanese Minamoto clan
- Kawachi Genji, were members of a family line within that of the Seiwa Genji

== See also ==
- Kenji (disambiguation)
