= Tetsuzō Iwamoto =

Japanese fighter pilot (1916–1955)

- 岩本 徹三
- Born: June 15, 1916; Karafuto, Japan (now Sakhalin, Russia)
- Died: May 20, 1955 (aged 38); Masuda, Shimane, Japan
- Military career
- Allegiance: Empire of Japan
- Branch: Imperial Japanese Navy Air Service
- Service years: 1934–1945
- Rank: Lieutenant Junior Grade
- Nicknames: Zero Fighter Ace; Kotetsu "Tiger Tetsu"
- Units: 12th Air Group; Zuikaku
- Conflicts: Second Sino-Japanese War; World War II
- Awards: Order of the Golden Kite, 5th Class; Order of the Rising Sun, Green Paulownia Leaves Medal, 7th Class

Lieutenant Junior Grade Tetsuzō Iwamoto (岩本 徹三, Iwamoto Tetsuzō; 15 June 1916 – 20 May 1955) was one of the top scoring aces among Imperial Japanese Navy Air Service (IJNAS) fighter pilots. He entered the Imperial Navy in 1934 and completed pilot training in December 1936. His first combat occurred over China in early 1938. He emerged as one of the top aces of Imperial Japan during World War II, credited with at least 80 aerial victories, including 14 victories in China. Subsequently, he flew Zeros from the aircraft carrier Zuikaku from December 1941 to May 1942, including at the Battle of the Coral Sea. Iwamoto decorated his planes with victory markings of cherry blossom flowers, with a single or double blossom flower referring to a shot down enemy fighter or bomber aircraft respectively.

In late 1943, Iwamoto's air group was sent to Rabaul, New Britain, resulting in three months of air combat against Allied air raids.

Subsequent assignments were Truk Atoll in the Carolines and the Philippines, being commissioned an ensign in October 1944. Following the evacuation of the Philippines, Iwamoto served in home defense and trained kamikaze pilots.

As a result of the Japanese use of the British naval practices, the IJNAS scoring system was based on the system the Royal Navy and the Royal Air Force (RAF) adopted from World War I until World War II. This system differed from the scoring system used by some other nations during World War II. Research by academics surnamed Izawa and Hata in 1971 estimated his score at about 80 or more than 87. In December 1993, Izawa wrote that Iwamoto was virtually the top ace of the IJNAS.

As of mid-1944, there remained only two IJNAS fighter pilots who were credited with over 100 victories. Depending on various totals cited, Tetsuzō Iwamoto or Hiroyoshi Nishizawa was Japan's top ace. Iwamoto was known as the Chūtai leader (Flying Company, squadron of 8 to 16 fighters). Iwamoto was one of few survivors of the IJNAS from the early part of the Second World War. He fought over the Indian and the Pacific Ocean from north to south, and trained young pilots even in the last months of the war. Like many Japanese veterans, Iwamoto was reported to have fallen into depression after the war. His diary was found after his death, with claims of 202 Allied aircraft destroyed.

== Early life ==
Tetsuzo was the third son of the Iwamoto family. He was born on a border town, southern part of Karafuto 15 June 1916, later grew up in Sapporo, Hokkaidō, Japan. He enjoyed skiing in his elementary school days. When he lived in Sapporo, his father was a chief police officer.

When he was 13, his father retired and Tetsuzo moved with his family to his father's hometown, Masuda, Shimane Prefecture. He studied at the Prefectural Masuda Agricultural and Forestry High School. His favorite school subjects were mathematics and geometry; in these subjects, he always scored As on his school report.

He was an active and nimble boy. He joined a school club brass band as a trumpeter. Another hobby was growing plants and flowers. He helped local fishermen in the fishing season, going out to the sandy beach early in the morning and driving fish into the nets. He talked down to his teachers sometimes in discussions, which was very impolite for a school student in pre-war Japan. He was regarded as the most opinionated student in his school.

== Starting military career ==
Iwamoto with the Tsukuba Air Group, 1936

Iwamoto started his military career in 1934 after he graduated the school at 18. Following the advice from his parents to study while young, Tetsuzo left for a large city where he was supposed to take a college entrance examination. He, however, secretly applied for and passed the examination for acceptance as an Imperial Japanese naval airman 4th class, and was promoted to 3rd class 5 months later. His parents were very disappointed, for they became reliant upon Tetsuzo rather than his eldest brother, who was already studying at some university in a large city and would not return to Masuda.

In 1936, when he was a naval mechanic 2nd class and a crewman on the light aircraft carrier Ryūjō, he studied hard and passed the difficult IJNAS exam, taken by thousands of applicants. He was enrolled in the class 34th Sōju-Renshūsei (Sōren means flight trainee program) for naval petty officers and sailors. He graduated as one of the select 26 young aviators of the class 34th Sōju-Renshūsei (flight trainee program) in December of that year.

On April 4, 1936, he was sent to Kasumigaura-Ku (Kasumigaura FR(AG)) as a probationer in the class 34th Sōju-Renshūsei (flight trainee program), then on April 28, formally joined Kasumigaura-Ku. While his training going on November 1, 1936, he was promoted to naval mechanic 1st class. Finally on December 26, he graduated 34th class of Sōju-Renshūsei, was promoted to airman 1st class (old rank name of pre-war Japan, equivalent to senior airman). During flight training school at the Tomobe branch of Kasumigaura-Ku (Kasumigaura FR(AG)), his fighter course instructor was the well-known Chitoshi Isozaki.

In December 1936. Iwamoto entered Saeki Kōkūtai (a Kōkūtai was a Naval Air Group, whether being based at land or on board a carrier) for 6 months of advanced training (termed extended education), finished and next entered Omura Kōkūtai on July 16, 1937. He had hard training there every day from senior pilots including Air Petty Officer 1st class Toshio Kuroiwa (rank grade was at that time), who was the IJNAS legendary dogfight master pilot. Tetsuzo Iwamoto (called Tetsu in short from his senior pilots) had to wait for his debut until February 10, 1938.

== China front ==
Tetsuzo's ability as a fighter pilot was recognized by all on his first air mission with the 13th Flying Group on February 25, 1938, over Nanchang, China.

After combat training, on February 10, 1938, Tetsuzō Iwamoto was led by his leader APO 1/C Toshio Kuroiwa, flying for two and a quarter hours over the China Sea from Omura Airbase at Kyūshū Japan to the airfield outside of Nanjing China.

His squadron on the Chinese frontline was the 13th Flying Group Fighter Squadron. This Flying Group was highly regarded and was famed as the Nango Fighter Squadron, named after its former squadron leader, Mochifumi Nango, who had shown considerable courage and conspicuous leadership.

Iwamoto's first experience of combat came on February 25, 1938, over Nanchang. His squadron's fighters escorted a group of Type 96 land-based attack aircraft. Chinese fighters attacked, and the squadron's leader Lieutenant Takuma was lost on this mission.

Iwamoto described his first combat experience in his notes. During the escort mission, his squadron was intercepted by sixteen I-15s and I-16s at an altitude of 5000 meters. Iwamoto claimed 4 victories (1 probable) in the combat. He secured his first victory by firing when within 50m of the enemy fighter. He first saw white smoke, then the enemy burned up and crashed. He was then at an altitude of 4000 m. When he looked back, there was an enemy fighter just behind him. He instantly made a Split S maneuver and narrowly escaped.

He got his second victory against an I-15. He saw it below him, turned and attacked from its 6 o'clock high. When it was hit, it climbed sharply and went spinning downward out of control and crashed into the ground. He kept his altitude of 4,000 m. He got an I-16 at the top of its roll in his gunsight and fired a burst, its engine burning and out of control; Tetsuzo lost sight of it before it crashed, and he reported this as probable. Another I-15 came down to him from 12 o'clock ahead. Both made a climb and were soon in a dogfight. The I-15 tried to break free of him and made a straight dive. That action made it easier for Tetsuzo to aim. He downed this I-15 on farmland near the airfield. He was flying at an altitude of 2000 m.

Above him, many enemy fighters were maneuvering. He found one of them coming down with landing gear down. He chased it to an altitude of 200 m and fired a burst. The I-16 was surprised and made a Split S maneuver, but crashed at a corner of the airfield. This was his 4th victory.

Anti-aircraft guns started firing heavily, and he found himself in an intense barrage of flak. Rushing to escape at full throttle with a number of enemy fighters behind him, he succeeded in returning safely from the battlefield. His leader Kuroiwa had already returned to the Wuhu airfield, Anhui China, waiting for his return. Kuroiwa scolded Tetsu severely for the rash attacks he made on the day.

The 13th Flying Group Fighter Squadron was merged with the 12th Fighter Squadron on March 22, 1938, where Type 96 carrier fighters for 1st Chutai had landing gear painted in red and were called Red legs squadron while 2nd Chutai had gear painted in blue and were called Blue legs squadron.

Iwamoto was awarded the citation of flying group Cmdr Tsukahara for his extreme courage and conspicuous gallantry in action above and beyond the call of duty as a fighter pilot against intense Chinese air force on April 29, 1938. He made 82 sorties and 14 victories credited in the China front. Tetsuzō Iwamoto became the top IJNAS ace. His activities subsequently earned him Order of the Golden Kite – 5th class recommendation in 1940.

In September 1938, 22-year-old Iwamoto was ordered back to Japan, where he became a member of the Saiki Air Group and appointed to a training staff.

== His flight log ==
Flying Technique: Class-A of IJNAS
Flight hours: over 8,000 hrs in March 1944

(net hours, not tripled as with a US single-seated fighter pilot. It was very unusual among IJNAS, IJAAS fighter pilots, although it was usual over 10,000 flying hours among the multi-seated aircraft IJNAS, IJAAS veteran pilots.)

Oceanic Transition: possible, navigating and leading his fighter chutai (without Radar)
Instrument Flight: possible
Night Flight: possible

Single-seat Fighter reconnaissance and attack mission across night ocean: possible
Night landing: possible with simple approach lighting system
Night carrier landing: possible with approach path indicator lights

Only experienced fighter pilots in the IJNAS could execute instrument flight with their single-seat fighter aircraft on combat missions; few IJNAS officer pilots could fly on instruments.

== Tactics ==
Single to single dogfight tactic – from losing to winning

Quick roll (Roll Senpō)

(up and down quick roll tactic, skidding sideway (sudden decelerate) within 1/2 quick roll to forward the opponent aircraft on one's tail and get tail shot position of it. Cmdr Takeo Shibata promoted, his men developed and taught him.)

Corkscrew loop (Hineri-Komi Senpō)

(short-cut or twist-in loop tactic, skidding loop. Lieutenant Isamu Mochizuki's special, Section leader and Warrant Officer Toshio Kuroiwa trained him.)

Yo-yo turn (Suichoku-Senkai Kasoku Senpō)

(Lt. JG Sadaaki Akamatsu's special at China front. )

Formation tactics –

Two groups linked formation attack

one section plays offence, zooming and diving formation attack, another section plays defense, positioned on the higher altitude to cover and support the offence section.

Keeping his groups underneath thick clouds to hide his formation and waiting until the small number of opponent aircraft group coming down, then diving and zooming attack with all in formation.
Attacking the opponent groups after their mission over and on the way to the waiting circle, in a group to fly back across the distance range over the sea. This tactics was taken when his group had much fewer aircraft.

No.3 Aerial Bomb attack tactic –

Twelve o'clock high vertical dive attack from the front top in inverted flight (Haimen Suichoku Kōka Senpō)

Almost vertical diving (about 60 degree) attack because the 30 kg No. 3 Aerial Bomb needs the releasing speed over 280 knots to work timer correctly for 1st small explosion.
Inverted flight at the starting point because Zero Fighter could not keep steep angle while diving due to its excellent flight stability.

== Aerial victories claimed in his diary ==
(World War II, 8 December 1941 – July 1942, April 1943 – 15 August 1945, Allied U.S. Army, Navy, Marine, Royal Navy, Australia, New Zealand)

- F4F victories – 7 (Coral Sea, 8 May 1942; Rabaul, late 1943 – 10AM 19 February 1944 the escort fighters of Martin flying boat)
- P-38 victories – 4 (Rabaul, late 1943 – 1944)
- F4U victories – 48; unconfirmed 1 (Rabaul, late 1943 – February 1944; Mobara-airbase outskirts of Tokyo, Japan, February 16, 1945; Operation Kikusui (Imperial Chrysanthemum on the Water – divine wind), Okinawa, March 10 – June 24, 1945). This is more than 1 in 4 of all F4U air-to-air losses during the Second World War.
- P-39 victories – 2 (Rabaul, late 1943)
- P-40 victory – 1 (Rabaul, late 1943)
- F6F victories – 29 (Rabaul, late 1943 - Feb. 1944; Truk 28–29 April 1944; Operation Kikusui, Okinawa, March 10 – June 15, 1945)
- P-47 victory – 1 (Rabaul, late 1943 - 1944)
- P-51 victory – 1 (Rabaul, AM 19 February 1944, the Allied 2nd air-raid of the day, recognized as the latest-style escort fighters)
- British "Spitfire" (= Hurricane) – 4; burned on the ground 2 (Indian Ocean, 9 April 1942)
- SBD victories – 48; unconfirmed 7 (Coral Sea, 8 May 1942; Rabaul, late 1943 – February 1944; Truk 28, 29 April 1944; Battle off Formosa, 12 October 1944)
- SBD w/No.3 Aerial Bomb victories – 30 (Rabaul, late 1943 – 1944)
- TBF victories – 5; unconfirmed 19 (Rabaul, late 1943 – 1110 19 February 1944, the Allied 6th and the 3rd final air-raid of the day to Rabaul)
- SB2C victories – 5 (Rabaul, late 1943 – 1944)
- B-25 victories – 8 (Rabaul, late 1943 0900 19 February 1944, the Allied 4th air-raid of the day)
- B-26 victories – 2 (Rabaul, late 1943 - 1944)
- B-24 victories – 6; w/No. 3 Aerial Bomb victories (SH) 24, damaged 2 (Truk, 6 March – June 1944, confirmed by ground members)
- B-29 victory – 1 (Kagoshima, Kyushu, Japan, April 1945)
- PBY5A flying boat victory – (SH) 1 (Indian Sea, April 5, 1942)
- Martin Mariner flying boat victory – (SH) 1 (Rabaul, 10AM 19 February 1944, interlude between Allied air-raids of the day, escorted by 12 F4Fs)
- Strafed Destroyers – 3 (Rapopo Rabaul, Night February 5, 1944)
- Strafed Landing Craft – some hundreds (Kerama islands, Okinawa, night March 26, 1945)
- Strafed Airfields – Lae, Eastern New Guinea, January 23, 1942; Torokina, Bougainville, Solomons, night 1944)

== Promotions ==
from the corresponding article in the Japanese Wikipedia

- Sailor Fourth Class (Seaman Recruit) – June 1, 1934
- Sailor Third Class (Seaman) – November 15, 1934
- Sailor Second Class (Able Seaman) – November 2, 1935
- Sailor First Class (Leading Seaman) – December 26, 1935
- Petty Officer Third Class – May 1, 1938
- Petty Officer Second Class (Petty Officer) – November 1, 1939
- Petty Officer First Class (Chief Petty Officer) – May 1, 1941
- Chief Petty Officer (regrading of Petty Officer First Class) – November 1, 1942
- Commissioned an Ensign – November 1, 1944
- Promoted to Sub-Lieutenant upon retirement – September 5, 1945

=== Awards ===
from the corresponding article in the Japanese Wikipedia

- Order of the Golden Kite, Fifth Class – August 1, 1942

== Post-war life ==
The Allied Occupation Forces searched for individuals to condemn for war crimes in the Japanese Officer Corps. Iwamoto was summoned twice for questioning to Douglas MacArthur's Allied GHQ office in Tokyo. Although he managed to avoid being declared a war criminal, he was nevertheless blacklisted from public sector employment. Managers of nongovernmental businesses and local factories in his hometown also did not dare to employ him, in order to comply with the wishes of the new Allied GHQ. In general, anyone who had been an officer in the IJA or IJN was disliked by the Allied Occupation Forces.

Postwar, the GHQ directed Japanese journalists who had supported the Japanese military during the war to start a radio propaganda promoting pacifism called Shinsō wa kō da ("The Truth Is This"). This program considered people such as Iwamoto the cat's-paws of militarism.

Iwamoto struggled to survive until the San Francisco Peace Conference was held, after which, in the spring of 1952, the Allied Occupation Forces finally left Japan.

In 1952, Iwamoto finally obtained employment at the Masuda spinning mill of Daiwa Bōseki (since renamed to "Daiwabō" Co., Ltd, 大和紡績).

In the summer of 1953, Iwamoto developed a stomach ache. A surgeon examined him and diagnosed enteritis. It was found later to be appendicitis. After a series of operations, he complained of a backache. Doctors decided to operate on him again. For reasons which are not entirely clear, the surgical team decided to remove three or four ribs without anesthesia. This led to sepsis.

Iwamoto died on 20 May 1955, at the age of just 38 years old. His wife recalled his final words: "When I get well, I want to fly again."

== Movie ==
- Nippon Eiga-sha, Feb.16, 1944, Nippon News No.194 Solomon no Gekisen Nankai-Kessenjo (means, Southern Ocean Battle Fields of Solomon)
- Nippon Eiga-sha, Feb.2, 1944, Nippon News No.192 Rabaul (means, Fortress Rabaul)
