= 賢治 =

賢治, meaning "wise, govern", is an Asian given name.

It may refer to:

- Kenji, Japanese masculine given name
- Stanley Mei (梅賢治; born 1986), Taiwanese actor from Kinmen who cast in many television series, such as Bitter Sweet, Dear Mom and Hello Again!, etc.
