= Kenji Takenaka =

Japanese woodblock print artist (born 1970)

- 竹中 健司
- Born: 1970 (age 55–56)
- Occupations: Woodblock print artist, printer
- Known for: Fifth-generation printer at Takenaka Woodblock Printing; Director of Takezasado Co., Ltd.
- Website: kenjitakenaka.kyoto

Kenji Takenaka (born 1970) is a Japanese woodblock print artist and the fifth-generation printer of the Takenaka family studio, a woodblock workshop based in Kyoto and founded in 1891. He currently serves as the representative director of Takezasado Co., Ltd., a company involved in both traditional Japanese woodblock printing and modern design collaborations.

== Early Life and Training ==
Takenaka began learning traditional woodblock printing techniques, particularly the art of printing (suri), during his teenage years under his father, Seihachi Takenaka, the fourth-generation printer of the family workshop. In 2002, Seihachi received the Medal with Yellow Ribbon and was recognized as a Contemporary Master Craftsman by the Japanese Ministry of Health, Labour and Welfare. Kenji later succeeded him as the fifth-generation printer and has explored ways to apply traditional techniques in contemporary contexts.

== Employment Model and Studio Expansion ==
In 1999, Takenaka founded Takezasado Co., Ltd. (originally established as a limited company). He introduced a new employment model in the field of traditional crafts by hiring designers, carvers, and printers—three roles that had traditionally been carried out independently under a division of labor. The designers in this model were responsible for creating the original drawings for prints, in a role comparable to that of ukiyo-e artists in historical Japanese woodblock print production. He mentored Yuko Harada, one of the few female artisans in the field at the time, who later succeeded as the sixth-generation printer. Takenaka also recruited Kazuki Nojima, a student he taught at Kyoto City University of Arts, who now works as a carver. Takezasado is among the few woodblock studios in Japan where designers, printers, and carvers work together under one roof.

== Preservation and Revival Projects ==
=== Faith-Based Printing Heritage ===
Takenaka has focused on the restoration and reproduction of old woodblocks used for ofuda (talismans) and religious images stored in shrines and temples throughout Japan. He began engaging with such materials before 2015 and has since launched a dedicated consultation platform for religious institutions seeking restoration support.

=== Revival of Exported Ukiyo-e Blocks ===
In 2009, Takenaka came across ukiyo-e woodblocks held by the National Library of France and hypothesized that they were original Edo-period blocks. Motivated by this discovery, he carried out a reproduction project in France in 2015, with support from Ritsumeikan University and the cities of Paris and Kyoto. The project was featured in a Kansai Television documentary.

== Research and Teaching ==
Takenaka has held academic and research positions including:

- Special Collaborative Researcher, Kyoto Seika University (2019–present)
- Project Technical Advisor, Musashino Art University (2014–2018)
- Visiting Researcher, Ritsumeikan University (2015)
- Lecturer, Kyoto City University of Arts (2012–2015)

As part of a project on early modern printing led by Musashino Art University, he contributed to the facsimile production of the Sagahon Utaihon series.

== Collaborations with Pop Culture ==
Takenaka has collaborated with pop culture franchises through the medium of traditional woodblock printing. These projects include works based on Monkey Punch’s Lupin III, Leiji Matsumoto’s Galaxy Express 999, Space Battleship Yamato, and Captain Harlock, as well as characters from the online game Rainbow Six Siege.

== Public Collections and Recognition ==
In 2025, the traditional fukibokashi (blown gradation) technique was applied to contemporary branding in the red coloration of the MUSIC AWARDS JAPAN logo, with Takenaka contributing as the woodblock print artist.

In 2019, he collaborated again with art director Yoshiki Uchida on a design project that received a Silver Pentaward for packaging design.

In 2013, Takenaka and Uchida produced the woodblock-printed poster Create., which received Bronze awards at both the D&AD Awards and The One Show.

Takenaka's works are also held in public museum collections, including:

- Museum of Fine Arts, Boston
- Honolulu Museum of Art – a reproduction of a work by Hiroshige, hand-printed by Takenaka.

== Exhibitions ==
- Enduring Impressions: Contemporary Woodblock Prints, Honolulu Museum of Art (2025–2026)
- Water-based Woodblock Prints Exhibition, ABS Gallery (2015)
- Bi‑dan, Dohjidai Gallery (2012)
- SORA – 1/3 of a Gaze, Dohjidai Gallery (2011)
- Takenaka Masterpiece Theatre, Takezasado Gallery (2010)
- Taikyoku – First Game, Takezasado Gallery (2010)

== Publications ==
- Co-authored: Woodblock Printing: Traditional Techniques and Designs – History of Publishing Culture through Collaboration between Painters, Carvers, and Printers (Japanese: 『木版画 伝統技法とその意匠 絵師・彫師・摺師 三者協業による出版文化の歴史』), Seibundo Shinkosha (2021).
- Supervised: A Year in Kyoto Living with Paper (Japanese: 『竹中木版 竹笹堂 紙と暮らす京の一年』), written by Kyoko Naito, Takarajimasha (2014).
- Authored: Kyoto's Takezasado's First Woodblock Printing: A Book for Making Cute Miscellaneous Goods (Japanese: 『京都・竹笹堂 はじめての木版画 かわいい雑貨をつくる本』), Mitsumura Suiko Shoin (2011).
- Serial column contributor: Cha no Ma Monthly (2009–2010).
- Article: "Kappazuri Techniques in Woodblock Printing", in Ukiyo-e Art No. 152 (2006), International Ukiyo-e Society.

== Workshops and Lectures ==
Takenaka has conducted workshops, lectures, and mentorship programs in Japan and internationally, focusing on the preservation and transmission of traditional Japanese woodblock printing techniques. Major activities include:

- Mentorship of Belgian pop artist Vexx in Kyoto as part of the Lenovo Creator Odyssey international program (2025)
- Swedish Museum of World Culture workshop (2023)
- Honolulu Museum of Art workshop (2019)
- Kyoto Prefectural cultural symposium (2018)
