= Sumie Mishima =

Japanese writer

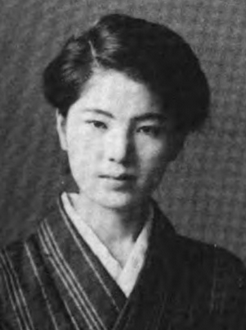
- Sumie Seo (later Mishima) as a student in the 1920s
- Born: Sumie Seo; 1900
- Died: 1992 (aged 91–92)
- Other names: Mishima Sumie, Seo Sumie
- Occupations: Educator, writer, translator

Sumie Seo Mishima (1900 – 1992) was a Japanese educator, translator, and writer. She is best known for two memoirs in English, My Narrow Isle (1941) and The Broader Way (1953).

== Early life and education ==
Seo was born into a samurai-class household near Osaka; her father was a teacher who studied in the United States. After her father died, she lived in her grandfather's household, and then with a paternal aunt in Tokyo. She graduated from Tsuda College, and spent five years in the United States, in part to avoid family pressures to marry. She attended Dana Hall School, and Wellesley College in 1927.

== Career ==
Mishima taught at her alma mater, Tsuda College, and gave private lessons in English. She translated a volume of historical legal documents, and other titles. She worked as a translator for the defense at the war crimes tribunals after World War II.

Mishima wrote two memoirs in English. The first, My Narrow Isle (1941), was reviewed in The Atlantic and The New York Times. Her second memoir, The Broader Way (1953), covered her experiences in Tokyo during and after World War II; it was described by one American reviewer as "the most important book to be written in English by a Japanese woman since the end of World War II." An Australian reviewer found it "an intensely personal account of one Japanese housewife's journey through a world war and a revolution in social custom."

In 1942, her Wellesley classmate Ruth Tilford Clowes profiled Mishima as a woman "caught between worlds". Ruth Benedict considered Mishima's My Narrow Isle in The Chrysanthemum and the Sword (1946), and anthropological study of Japanese culture in the mid-twentieth century.

== Publications ==
- My Narrow Isle: The Story of a Modern Woman in Japan (1941)
- The Broader Way: A Woman's Life in the New Japan (1953)

== Personal life ==
Seo married Hajime Mishima, a professor of Chinese studies who had four young children from his first marriage. She died in 1992, in her nineties.
