= Akira Yamamoto =

Japanese ace fighter pilot (1913–1944)

- 山本 旭
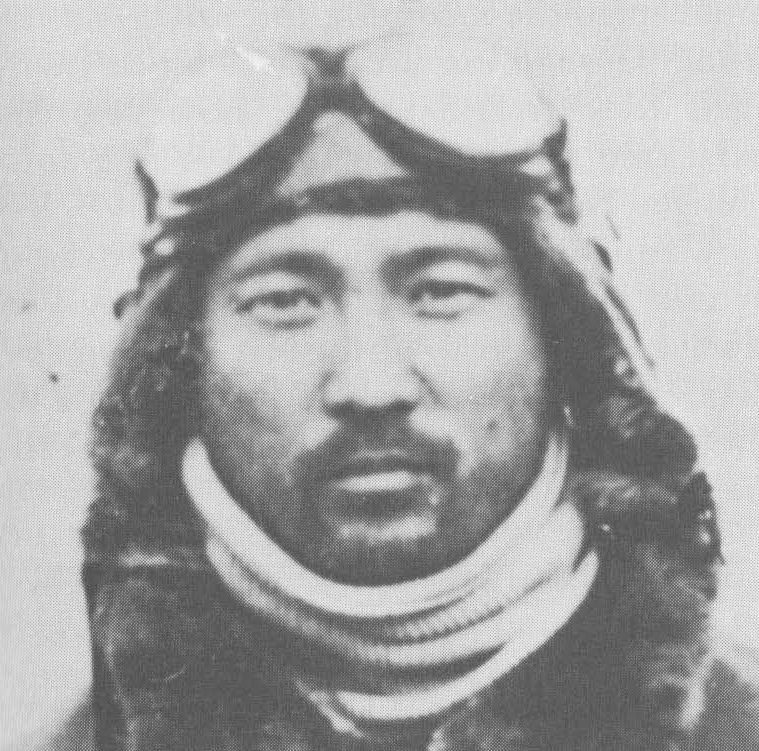
- Born: 1913; Shizuoka Prefecture, Japan
- Died: November 24, 1944 (aged 30–31); Yachimata, Chiba, Japan
- Military career
- Allegiance: Empire of Japan
- Branch: Imperial Japanese Navy Air Service (IJN)
- Rank: Lieutenant Junior Grade
- Conflicts: Second Sino-Japanese War; World War II; Pacific War

Akira Yamamoto (山本 旭, Yamamoto Akira; 1913 – 24 November 1944) was an officer and ace fighter pilot in the Imperial Japanese Navy (IJN) during the Second Sino-Japanese War and the Pacific theater of World War II. In aerial combat over China, the Pacific, and Japan, he was officially credited with destroying 13 enemy aircraft.

Flying an A6M2 Zero fighter from the aircraft carrier Kaga during the attack on Pearl Harbor in December 1941, Yamamoto claimed to have destroyed a civilian sight-seeing aircraft over Oahu which had happened into the path of the Japanese first strike wave. In June 1942, during the Battle of Midway, Kaga was fatally damaged by enemy action while Yamamoto was participating in the fleet's combat air patrol. Yamamoto landed his fighter on Hiryū and subsequently joined that carrier's successful retaliatory strike on the United States Navy carrier Yorktown. Yamamoto claimed to have destroyed four of Yorktown's fighter aircraft in the attack.

In October 1942, Yamamoto participated in the Battle of the Santa Cruz Islands as a member of Zuihō's fighter group. He was subsequently transferred to the home islands and participated in aerial battles over Iwo Jima, during which he was wounded in June 1944. After recovering from his injuries, Yamamoto took part in the interception of a B-29 bombing mission over Japan on 24 November 1944. Defensive fire from the B-29s crippled Yamamoto's aircraft and he bailed out over Yachimata, Chiba. His parachute failed to open and Yamamoto plunged to his death.
