= Kenji Yoshitsuru =

Japanese baseball player and coach (born 1971)

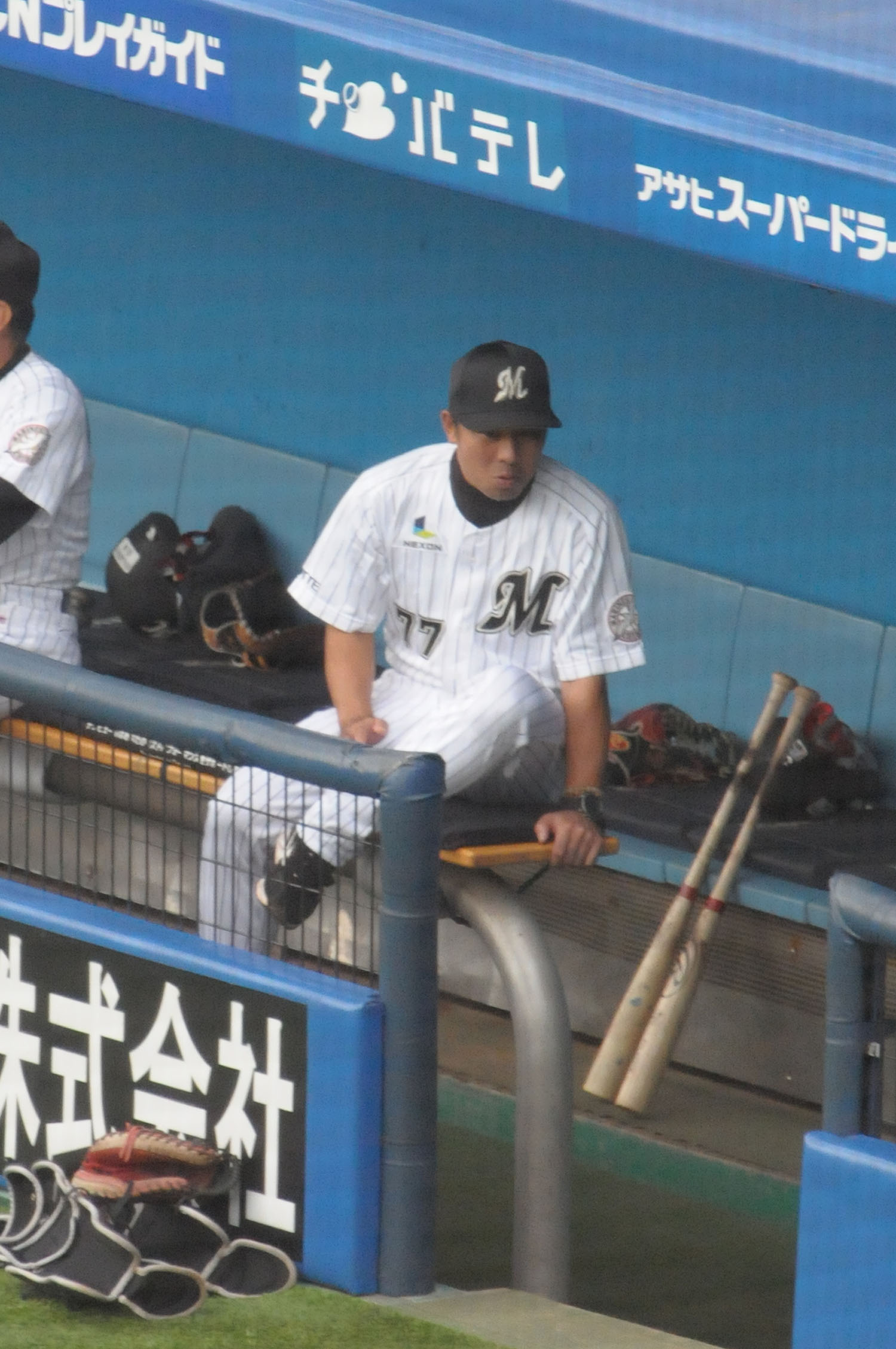
- Kenji Yoshitsuru, coach of the Chiba Lotte Marines, at Chiba Marine Stadium.
- Catcher / Coach
- Born: May 3, 1971; Kagoshima, Kagoshima, Japan
- Batted: Right Threw: Right

NPB debut
- April 11, 1993, for the Chunichi Dragons

Last appearance
- 2002, for the Chiba Lotte Marines

NPB statistics
- Batting average: .236
- Hits: 147
- Home runs: 9
- Runs batted in: 59
- Stolen base: 6
- Stats at Baseball Reference

Teams
- As player: Chunichi Dragons (1993–1996); Chiba Lotte Marines (1996–2002); As coach: Chiba Lotte Marines (2003–2016); Fukuoka SoftBank Hawks (2017–2024)

Kenji Yoshitsuru (吉鶴 憲治, Yoshitsuru Kenji; born May 3, 1971) is a Japanese former Nippon Professional Baseball catcher, and current the third squad battery coach for the Fukuoka SoftBank Hawks of Nippon Professional Baseball (NPB).

He previously played for the Chunichi Dragons, the Chiba Lotte Marines.

== Professional career ==
=== Active player era ===
On November 21, 1992, Yoshitsuru was drafted fourth-round pick by the Chunichi Dragons in the 1992 Nippon Professional Baseball draft.

He made his debut in the Central League during the 1993 season, played 24 games.

He played three seasons with the Dragons, but in 1996, his fourth season, he was traded to the Chiba Lotte Marines along with Tsuyoshi Yoda.

He played in a career-high 98 games for the Marines during the 1997 season and set a career-high .283 batting average during the 1998 season, and he played 10 seasons with the Marines and retired after the 2002 season.

In his 10-season career, Yoshitsuru played a total of 389 games, batting .236 with 147 hits, nine home runs, and 59 RBI.

=== After retirement ===
After his retirement, Yoshitsuru was the battery coach for the Chiba Lotte Marines from the 2003 season through the 2016 season.

He became the third squad battery coach for the Fukuoka Softbank Hawks in the 2017 season and moved to first squad battery coach for the 2018 season.

He will serve as the third squad battery coach for the second time during the 2023 season.
