= Jianci =

Jianci is the Mandarin Pinyin spelling of a Chinese masculine given name. The same name is also spelled Chen-chu in Mandarin Wade-Giles (used in Taiwan) and in Cantonese pronunciation.

People with this name include:

- Lee Chen-chu (李健次; born 1940), Taiwanese boxer
- Tan Jianci (檀健次; born 1990), Chinese actor, singer, and dancer
