= Genji (woreda) =

- District
- Location within Ethiopia
- Country: Ethiopia
- Region: Oromia
- Zone: West Welega Zone

Genji is a district of the West Welega Zone of Oromia Region in Ethiopia.
