= Ken-ichi Ueda =

Japanese scientist

- Born: October 22, 1946 (age 79)
- Education: Osaka University; University of Tokyo

Ken-ichi Ueda (植田 憲一, Ueda Ken'ichi; born on October 22, 1946) is a Japanese laser scientist. He published more than 700 papers in international journals.

His research encompasses gas lasers, solid state lasers, high power fiber lasers, ceramic lasers for inertial confinement fusion research, gravitational wave detection, high field science and industrial applications.

== Education ==
Ueda received the B.S. and M.S. degrees in electrical engineering from Osaka University in 1969 and 1971, respectively. He received a PhD in Physical Chemistry from the University of Tokyo in 1977.

== Career ==
He was with the R&D center of JEOL from 1971 to 1976, where he investigated atomic spectroscopy and its applications. From 1976 to 1981, he was a staff member at the Physics Department of Sophia University in Tokyo, where he studied the relaxation processes of CO2 lasers. After joining the Institute for Laser Science at University of Electro-Communications in 1981 he investigated the kinetics of KrF excimers and the physics on generation of intense relativistic e-beams. He developed a high power KrF laser facility including multistaged amplifiers and a target chamber for laser-plasma interaction. He investigated ultra-high peak power lasers in the range of nanosecond to sub picosecond pulse duration. In 1990 he began to develop an ultra-stabilized laser-diode-pumped solid laser system for gravitational wave detection.

He developed super-white light generation and laser rainbow using self-trapping phenomena in gases and solids irradiated by intense and ultra-short pulses. He created new ideas on high power fiber lasers including fiber embedded disk lasers for industrial applications. He developed new concepts of solid state lasers like hybrid solid state lasers and ceramic lasers along with Konoshima Chemicals, Japan. He is a pioneer of fiber laser research in Japan. He developed kilowatt fiber-disk lasers and fiber Raman lasers.

His current interests cover laser applications. He is also a pioneer of high quality optics in Japan. He was the professor and the chief of the section on ultra-high power lasers at the Institute for Laser Science of the University of Electro-Communications from 1981 until 2011.

He was a director of Institute of Laser Science from 1996 until his retirement. He was also a visiting fellow at Toyota Physical and Chemical Institute. Currently he also occupies a leading scientist position in the Institute of Applied Physics under the Russian Academy of Sciences.

== Professional societies ==
He is a member of Joint Open Laboratory on Laser Crystals and Precision Measurements of the Russian Academy of Sciences. After his retirement, he is still active as a scientific advisor in Hamamatsu Photonics and also adviser for several international laser programmes and conferences.

He serves as a chairman, secretary general, and the member of the following committees; Corresponding member of Science Council of Japan Member of Committee of Journal Publication Issues of Science Council of Japan Member of IUPAP Working Group on Communication in Physics Board member of Physical Society of Japan Co-Chair of JJCQE (Japan Joint Council on Quantum Electronics) Member of ICQE (International Council on Quantum Electronics) Program Co-chair of CLEO PR 2009 Editor-in-chief of Optical Review Associate Editor of Laser Physics Letters Editor of High Power Laser Science and Engineering.

He served on many academic committees. Board member: OSA (2000-2002), JSAP (1999-2001), IPAP (2000-2001), Laser Society of Japan (2006-) Chair: IUAPA 017 (2005-2008), CLEO PR STC (1995-2007) Conference Chair: IQEC 2005 in Tokyo, Kaya conference in 2004 Editor: Topical Editor of Applied Optics (1996-2002), JOSA Editor for topical issue (2007), Quantum Electronics (2000-2003.

== Recognition ==
Ueda is an OSA fellow, JSAP fellow, and received many science awards including the National Medal with Purple Ribbon from the Japanese government, which is one of the best recognitions by the Japanese Government towards the contribution of science.
