= Mishima: A Vision of the Void =

1981 book by Marguerite Yourcenar

- 1986 edition
- Author: Marguerite Yourcenar
- Original title: Mishima ou la Vision du vide
- Language: French
- Subject: Yukio Mishima
- Publisher: Éditions Gallimard
- Publication date: 1 January 1981
- Publication place: France
- English publication date: 1986
- Pages: 124
- ISBN: 2-07-023887-3

Mishima: A Vision of the Void (French: Mishima ou la Vision du vide) is a book about the Japanese writer Yukio Mishima, written by Marguerite Yourcenar and published by éditions Gallimard in 1981.

== Summary ==
The writer Marguerite Yourcenar analyses the works and life of the Japanese writer and nationalist activist Yukio Mishima. Yourcenar never met Mishima, but they held a mutual respect for each other, and Yourcenar did visit Mishima's widow after his death.

== Reception ==
Publishers Weekly wrote that Yourcenar successfully analyses the strong Western influences on Mishima and his obsession with death, but that the book "is marred by fuzzy thinking dressed in pretentious or merely vapid language".

The Japan Times compared the book's treatment of Mishima's death to its public reception in Japan and wrote that Yourcenar was "less squeamish", writing that her book can be compared favourably to Mishima biographies by Henry Scott-Stokes, John Nathan and Damian Flanagan.
