= Kenji Okabe =

Japanese flying ace (1915–September 1943)

- 岡部 健二
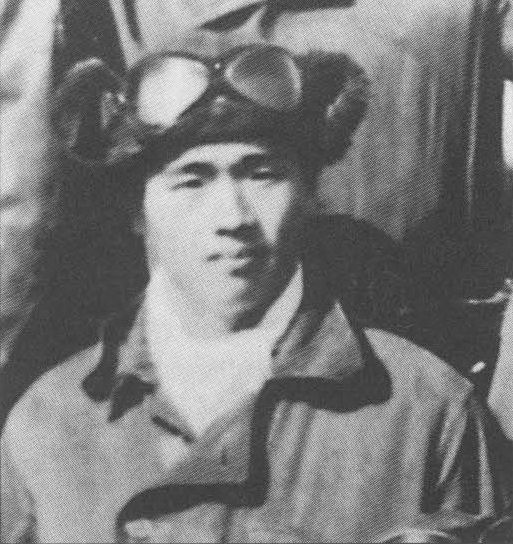
- Born: 1915; Fukuoka, Japan
- Died: September 1943 (aged 27–28); Bougainville, Papua New Guinea
- Military career
- Allegiance: Empire of Japan
- Branch: Imperial Japanese Navy Air Service (IJN)
- Rank: Ensign
- Units: Saeki Air Group; Ōmura Air Group; 12th Air Group; Shōkaku; 634th Naval Air Group; 601st Naval Air Group
- Conflicts: World War II; Attack on Pearl Harbor; Indian Ocean raid; Battle of the Coral Sea; Solomon Islands Campaign; Battle of Leyte

Kenji Okabe (岡部 健二, Okabe Kenji; 1915–September 1943) was an ace fighter pilot in the Imperial Japanese Navy (IJN) during World War II. Participating in many of the Pacific War battles and campaigns as a member of several units, Okabe was officially credited with destroying 15 enemy aircraft. Okabe was credited with shooting down eight enemy aircraft on 8 May 1942 during the Battle of the Coral Sea, the IJN's official record for the number of aircraft destroyed in a single encounter. He is famous for his strong opposition to the kamikaze attacks, rare in IJN at the time. Okabe was killed in action in September 1943 over Bougainville, Papua New Guinea.
