= Chief Detective Kenichi =

Japanese manga series

- Cover of Chief Detective Kenichi volume 1 from the Osamu Tezuka Manga Complete Works edition.

ケン1探偵長 (Kenichi Tantei Chou)
- Manga
- Written by: Osamu Tezuka
- Published by: Kodansha
- Magazine: Shōnen Club
- Original run: June 1954 – December 1956
- Volumes: 2

Chief Detective Kenichi (ケン1探偵長, Kenichi Tantei Chou) is a manga series by Osamu Tezuka published in Kodansha's Shōnen Club from June 1954 to December 1956.

== Plot ==
The manga follows Kenichi, the chief detective of the national Boy Detectives' Street Society. He is joined by Donguri, a talking bird. Together, they travel to various exotic locations solving mysteries, revealing tricks and settling cases. Every chapter has him solving a new mystery in various locations across the world.

Incident of the House of Spiders

Kenichi's final case ("Incident of the House of Spiders") was published in Akita Publishing's Boken-O magazine.

== Characters ==
Kenichi

The protagonist and chief of the Boy Detectives' Street Society.

Donguri

A Myna bird that is always at Kenichi's side. He has a special ability to be able to reproduce the voice of a person it has heard only once before.

Kenichi's Mother

Kenichi's Father

Mouse Boy

Mr. Hiranuma

Lemonade Citron

Detective Beringen

Elise
