= Kenji Holloway =

American politician

Member of the Mississippi House of Representatives from the 27th district
- Incumbent
- Assumed office January 2, 2024
- Preceded by: Kenneth Walker

Personal details
- Born: December 23, 1978 (age 47)
- Party: Democratic
- Spouse: Temeka Townsend
- Occupation: Politician

Kenji Holloway serves as a member of the Mississippi House of Representatives for the 27th District, affiliating with the Democratic Party, a position he has held since 2024.
