= Patrick Kenji Takahashi =

Patrick Kenji Takahashi (born September 6, 1940, in Honolulu, Hawaii) is an American biochemical engineer and popular science writer. He has published more than a hundred scientific papers and written four books. He is director emeritus of the Hawaii Natural Energy Institute at the University of Hawaii.

== Biography ==
Takahashi was born in Honolulu, Hawaii, on September 6, 1940, the son of Doris and Stanley Takahashi. He attended public schools in Honolulu and in 1962 obtained a B.S. degree in chemical engineering from Stanford University. He went on to work for the sugar industry in Hawaii until 1968, when he was sent by the industry for graduate work in sugar engineering at Louisiana State University, where in 1971 he obtained a PhD in biochemical engineering, with a dissertation entitle “Tunable Laser Irradiation of Escherichia coli.”

He began teaching in the college of engineering at the University of Hawaii courses such as computer programming, environmental engineering and technology & society. His first research program was funded by the National Science Foundation Research Applied to National Needs program on geothermal reservoir engineering.

He spent an assignment with the NASA Ames Research Center in 1976 on SETI, where he advanced a concept to directly detect extrasolar planets, following suggestions by Charles Townes. The faculty team published a book entitled, Project Orion. He subsequently spent two summer assignments with the Lawrence Livermore National Laboratory on laser fusion.

In the mid-1970s he served as chairman of the Wind Energy Division of the American Solar Energy Society and helped develop the wind power engineering program for the State of Hawaii. In 1979, Takahashi became a Special Assistant to U.S. Senator Spark Matsunaga and drafted bills relating to hydrogen and ocean thermal energy conversion.

He returned to the University of Hawaii in 1982 as professor of engineering and co-founded the Pacific International Center for High Technology Research. For a decade he held a dual role as director of Hawaii Natural Energy Institute and vice president of development for PICHTR, where his team obtained net positive energy for a U.S. Department of Energy open cycle ocean thermal energy conversion facility at the Natural Energy Laboratory of Hawaii. He also helped initiate a biomass to methanol project for the center. Each project was budget for approximately $25 million. From the mid-1980s into the 1990s, he supervised over research for producing energy from algae. and hydrogen. Over a three-year period, from 1987 to 1989, he hosted a series of workshops to develop an open ocean system to produce hydrogen from sunlight, marine microbes and genetic engineering.

In the 1990s, his interest began to focus on the Blue Revolution, to utilize the nutrient rich deep ocean water, in combination with surface waters, to produce marine biomass plantations, next generation fisheries and sustainable fuels, while remediating global warming and preventing the formation of hurricanes. In 1992 he was the principal investigator of a blue-ribbon panel convened by the National Science Foundation and National Oceanic and Atmospheric Administration to develop a national plan for ocean resources, and produced U.S. Ocean Resources 2000. In 2003, he was asked by UNESCO of the United Nations to present to the biennial meeting of the International Oceanographic Commission in Paris the Anton Bruun Memorial Lecture, presenting a case for the Blue Revolution as an international mission.

For past 15 years Professor Takahashi has also been involved with hydrogen, and in the mid-1990s chaired the U.S. Secretary of Energy's Hydrogen Technical Advisory Panel, which produced the Green Hydrogen Report, which served as the basis for funding the national hydrogen research program. He has widely published in this field, and currently coordinates a biohydrogen program funded by the U.S. Department of Energy.

His book, Simple Solutions for Planet Earth, ISBN 978-1434327543, covers a variety of environmental and energy problems and potential solutions.
