= Kenichi Suzuki =

Kenichi Suzuki may refer to:

== Name spelled 鈴木憲一 ==
- Kenichi Suzuki (politician) (鈴木憲一, Born 1898), member of the Japanese House of Councillors for the Chiba at-large district from 1947 to 1950

== Name spelled 鈴木健一 ==
- Kenichi Suzuki (director) (鈴木健一), Japanese anime director

== Name spelled 鈴木 賢一 ==
- Kenichi Suzuki (athlete) (鈴木 賢一, born 1967), Japanese long-distance runner
- Kenichi Suzuki (wrestler) (鈴木 賢一, born 1969), Japanese sport wrestler

== Name spelling unknown ==
- Kenichi Suzuki (ice hockey) (born 1963), Japanese ice hockey player
- Kenichi Suzuki (cyclist) (born 1981), Japanese cyclist in 2011 Jelajah Malaysia etc.
- Kenichi Suzuki (table tennis), Japanese table tennis player, played Table tennis at the 1992 Summer Paralympics
- Kenichi Suzuki (musician), Bassist and vocalist for Japanese metal band Ningen Isu
