= Kenji Sato (baseball) =

Japanese baseball player

- Outfielder
- Born: August 26, 1988 (age 37); Tokyo, Japan
- Bats: Left Throws: Right

debut
- 2007, for the Chiba Lotte Marines

Career statistics (through 2013 season)
- Runs: 2000
- Hits: 22
- Stolen Bases: 1

Teams
- Chiba Lotte Marines (2007–2010); Hokkaido Nippon-Ham Fighters (2010–2015)

Kenji Sato (佐藤 賢治, Satō Kenji) is a Japanese professional baseball player. He was born on August 26, 1988. He debuted in October 15, 2010. He had 9 runs in 2013.
