= Kenji Otsubo =

Japanese businessman (born 1944)

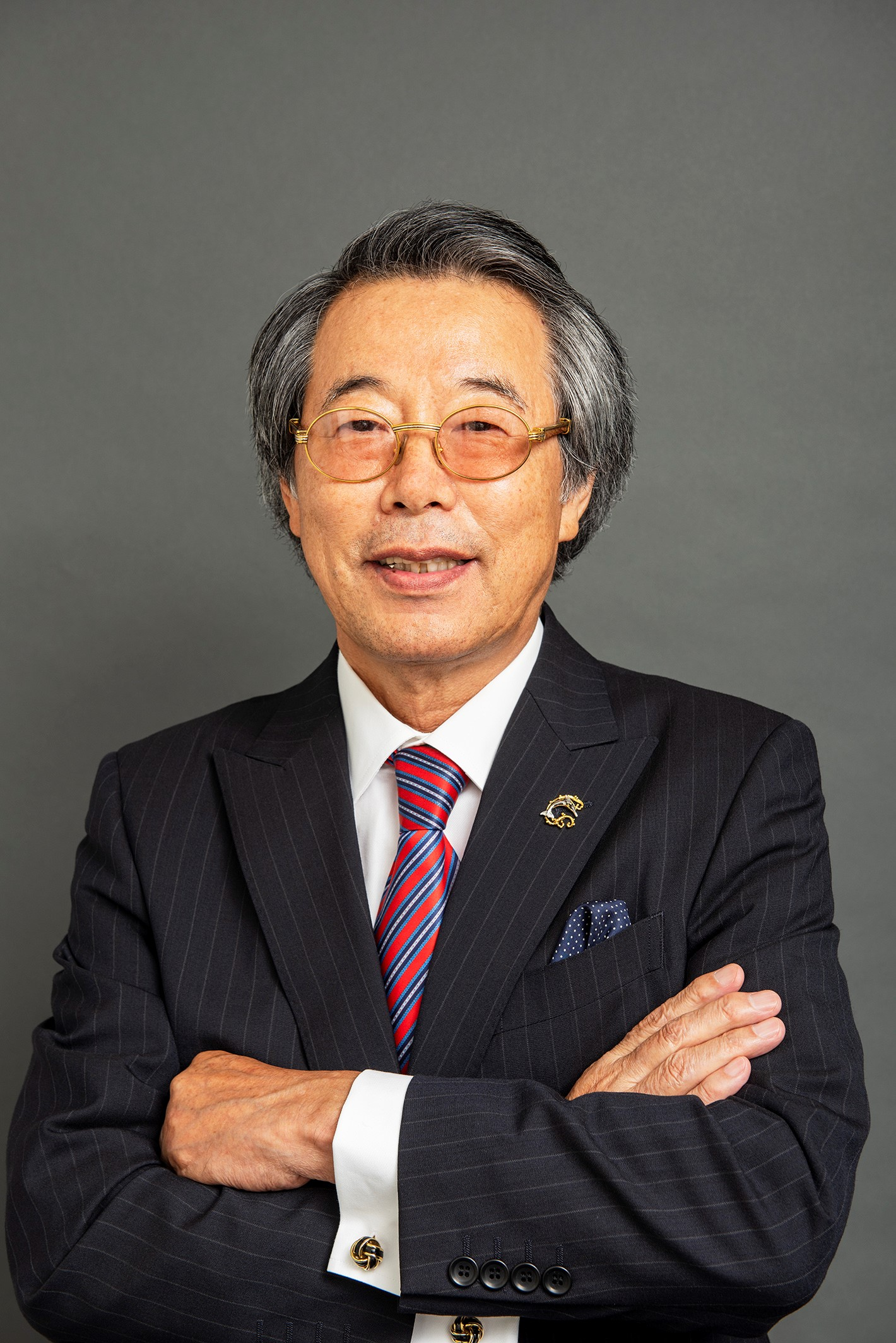
- Born: May 25, 1944 (age 81); Minamiuonuma, Niigata
- Education: Nihon University Bachelor of Laws (LLB), University of Washington Master of Laws (LLM)
- Occupations: Founder & CEO of Otsubo Realty

Kenji Otsubo (Japanese: 大坪 賢次, Hepburn: Kenji Otsubo; born May 25, 1944) is a Japanese businessman.

== Education ==
Otsubo attended Nihon University earning a bachelor's degree in 1967 then moved to the United States to study at Louisiana State University and Stanford Business School. He enrolled in The School of Law at University of Washington, earning an LLM degree in 1981.

== Professional career ==
Otsubo began his law career as special counsel, from 1973 to 1978, in the field of US-Japan Business Trade at Baker & McKenzie in their Tokyo Office.

In 1981, Otsubo founded Otsubo International Corporation, a business consulting firm for which he serves as president and CEO. In 1985, Otsubo founded Otsubo Realty, a real estate brokerage firm as well as Otsubo Management Services Corporation.

As a real estate broker, Otsubo sold an undeveloped golf course property to Palisade Green Company. Otsubo invited Gary Player, the professional golf player and golf course designer to work on the project which later became Manhattan Woods Golf Club. The course was officially opened in 1998.

In 2018, Otsubo invited Asahi Shuzo's most well known sake brand, Dassai to build their first sake brewery in the United States in partnership with The Culinary Institute of America, Hyde Park, New York.

Asahi Shuzo purchased a former Stop and Shop property in New York. Construction of the brewery will commence in 2018 and is scheduled to open in 2019.

== Non-profit work ==
In 2004, Otsubo raised $150,000 in donations for the American Red Cross in efforts to aid those affected by the 2004 Chūetsu earthquake. Otsubo served as Honorary Chairman of The International Center of Rutgers University, and was a board member of The Zimmerli Art Museum at Rutgers University Museum. He served on the Board of Trustees of The Englewood Hospital and Medical Center in Englewood, New Jersey. He also served as board member and Sergeant of Arms of The New York Law Enforcement Foundation.

== Recognition ==
Otsubo was named Japanese Culinary Ambassador for The Culinary Institute of America, Hyde Park, New York in 2016. In 2009, was visiting professor at The Graduate Institute for Entrepreneurial Studies in Niigata, Japan. On March 10, 2018, Otsubo was appointed by Shunji Odaira, President of The Niigata Sake Brewers Association to Honorary Ambassador of Niigata Sake. On March 24, 2018, Otsubo was appointed by The Mayor of Minamiuonuma as Honorary Ambassador of Minamiuonuma, Niigata, Japan.

== Public service ==
On December 15, 2011, Otsubo was appointed by Minister of Foreign Affairs and European Integration, of Montenegro, Milan Roćen, to the Honorary Consul of Montenegro to Japan. The office of the Honorary Consul of Montenegro in Tokyo was opened at The Nippon Press Center building, Tokyo on June 4, 2012. Otsubo formed the Association of Friendship between Japan and Montenegro in 2015. The Honorary Chairman of the Association is Nobuhiko Higashikuni, nephew of Emperor Akihito and cousin of Crown Prince Naruhito.
