= Ōmori Station =

Ōmori Station or Omori Station may refer to several railway stations in Japan:

- Ōmori Station (Tokyo) (大森駅) in Tokyo
- Omori Station (Shizuoka) (尾盛駅) of Ōigawa Railway in Shizuoka Prefecture
- Ōmori Station (Shizuoka) (大森駅) of Tenryū Hamanako Railroad in Shizuoka Prefecture
- Ōmori-Kinjōgakuin-mae Station (大森・金城学院前駅) in Aichi Prefecture (called Ōmori Station until 1992)
