= Kenji Yamada (footballer) =

Japanese footballer

Kenji Yamada 山田 賢二
Personal information
- Full name: Kenji Yamada
- Date of birth: 15 March 1989 (age 37)
- Place of birth: Obihiro, Hokkaido, Japan
- Height: 1.80 m (5 ft 11 in)
- Position: Goalkeeper

Team information
- Current team: Renofa Yamaguchi (Goalkeeper coach)

Youth career
- 2004–2006: Muroran Ohtani HS
- 2007–2010: Kokushikan University

Senior career*
Years	Team	Apps	(Gls)
2011–2019	Vanraure Hachinohe	191	(0)
- * Club domestic league appearances and goals as of 21 March 2020

Kenji Yamada (山田 賢二, Yamada Kenji; born 15 March 1989) is a Japanese former footballer who last played as a goalkeeper and currently goalkeeper coach of Renofa Yamaguchi from 2024.

== Career ==
Yamada retired from playing at the end of the 2019 season to become Vanraure Hachinohe's goalkeeping coach.

From 2024, Yamada become to Renofa Yamaguchi as Goalkeeper coach.

== Career statistics ==
=== Club ===
As of 21 March 2020.

Club	Season	League			National Cup		League Cup		Other		Total	
Club	Season	Division	Apps	Goals	Apps	Goals	Apps	Goals	Apps	Goals	Apps	Goals
Kokushikan University	2011	–			1 (Note: Appearances in the Emperor's Cup)	0	–		0	0	1	0
Vanraure Hachinohe	2011	TSL 2 Division	9	0	0	0	–		0	0	9	0
Vanraure Hachinohe	2012	TSL 2 Division North	14	0	1	0	–		0	0	15	0
Vanraure Hachinohe	2013	TSL 1 Division	18	0	2	0	–		0	0	20	0
Vanraure Hachinohe	2014	JFL	26	0	2	0	–		0	0	27	0
Vanraure Hachinohe	2015	JFL	30	0	1	0	–		2 (Note: Appearances in the JFL Championship)	0	32	0
Vanraure Hachinohe	2016	JFL	28	0	1	0	–		0	0	29	0
Vanraure Hachinohe	2017	JFL	29	0	1	0	–		0	0	30	0
Vanraure Hachinohe	2018	JFL	8	0	0	0	–		0	0	8	0
Vanraure Hachinohe	2019	J3 League	29	0	2	0	0	0	0	0	31	0
Career total			191	0	11	0	0	0	2	0	204	0
