= Kenichi Yamamoto =

Kenichi Yamamoto may refer to:

- Kenichi Yamamoto (engineer) (1922-2017), Japanese mechanical engineer and President of Mazda
- Kenichi Yamamoto (mixed martial artist) (born 1976), Japanese mixed martial arts fighter
- Kenichi Yamamoto (skier) (1922–2002), Japanese cross country skier
- Kenichi Yamamoto (yakuza) (1925–1982), founder of the Yamaken-gumi gang
