= Kenzō =

- Gender: Male

Origin
- Origin: Japanese
- Meaning: Different depending on the kanji

Other names
- Related names: Ken; Ken'ichi; Kenji

Kenzō or Kenzo or Kenzou (けんぞう, ケンゾウ) is a common masculine Japanese given name.

== Possible ways of writing the name ==
"Kenzō" can be written using different kanji (Chinese characters) depending on the meaning:

- 賢三, "wise, three"
- 健三, "healthy, three"
- 謙三, "humble, three"
- 健想, "healthy, perception"
- 建造, "build, create"
- 健蔵, "healthy, storehouse"
- 憲蔵, "constitution, storehouse"
- 研造, "polish, create"

The name can also be written in hiragana or katakana.

== People ==
=== Mononym ===
- Emperor Kenzō (顕宗; born 5 AD), 23rd Japanese imperial ruler

=== Given name ===
- Adachi Kenzō (謙蔵; 1864–1948), Japanese politician
- Kenzo B (born 2004), American rapper
- Kenzo Cotton (born 1996), American sprinter
- Kenzo Fujisue (健三; born 1964), Japanese politician
- Kenzo Futaki (謙三; 1873–1966), Japanese doctor
- Kenzo Goudmijn (born 2001), Dutch footballer
- Kenzo Ikeda (c. 1905–?), Japanese rower
- Kenzo Izutsu (賢造; 1941–1984), Japanese swimmer
- Kenzō Katō (加藤 賢三; born 1980), Japanese sport wrestler
- Kenzo Kitakata (謙三; born 1947), Japanese novelist
- Kenzō Kotani (憲三; 1909–2003), last Yasukuni Shrine swordsmith
- Kenzo Maeda (顕蔵; born 1982), Japanese basketball coach
- Kenzō Masaoka (憲三; 1898–1988), Japanese animator
- Kenzō Matsumura (謙三; 1883–1971), Japanese politician
- Kenzo Mori (研三; 1914–2007), Japanese-Canadian journalist and editor
- Kenzo Nakamura (兼三; born 1973), retired judoka
- Kenzo Nambu (健造; born 1992), Japanese footballer
- Kenzo Ohashi (謙三; born 1934), Japanese football player
- Kenzo Okada (謙三; 1902–1982), Japanese-born American painter
- Kenzō Okuzaki (謙三; 1920–2005), Imperial Japanese Army soldier, anti-monarchist, writer and actor
- Kenzo Oshima (賢三; 1943-2021), Permanent Representative of Japan to the United Nations
- Kenzo Riedewald (born 2007), Dutch footballer
- Kenzo Seki (健三; born 1955), Japanese handball player
- Kenzō Shirai (健三; born 1996), Japanese gymnast
- Kenzo Simons (born 2001), Dutch swimmer
- Kenzo Suzuki (wrestler) (健想; born 1974), Japanese professional wrestler
- Kenzo Suzuki (astronomer) (憲蔵), a Japanese astronomer
- Kenzo Tada (健蔵; 1889–1976), Japanese dirt track motorcycle racer
- Kenzo Tagawa (兼三; born 1996), Japanese judoka
- Kenzō Takada (賢三; 1939–2020), Japanese fashion designer
- Kenzō Tange (健三; 1913–2005), Japanese architect
- Kenzo Taniguchi (堅三; born 1988), Japanese football player for FC Kagoshima
- Kenzo Tsujimoto (憲三; born 1940), Japanese businessman
- Kenzō Yagi (健三; 1914–2008), Japanese mineralogist
- Kenzo Yashima (八島健三; 1902–1979), Japanese long-distance runner
- Kenzo Yokoyama (謙三; born 1943), retired Japanese football player
- Mattéo Elias Kenzo Guendouzi Olié (born 1999), French footballer
- Nakagawa Kenzō (健藏; 1875–1944), Japanese bureaucrat and politician
- Tamoto Kenzō (研造; 1832–1912), Japanese photographer
- Wakakoma Kenzo (健三; 1937–2019), Japanese sumo wrestler
- William Kenzo Nakamura (健造; 1922–1944), United States Army soldier
- Yano Kenzo (兼三; 1896‒1981), Japanese bureaucrat and policeman

=== Surname ===
- Denis Kenzo (born 1989), Russian DJ and music producer
- Eddy Kenzo (born 1989), Ugandan singer and music executive
