= Shigetaka Ōmori =

- 大森 茂高
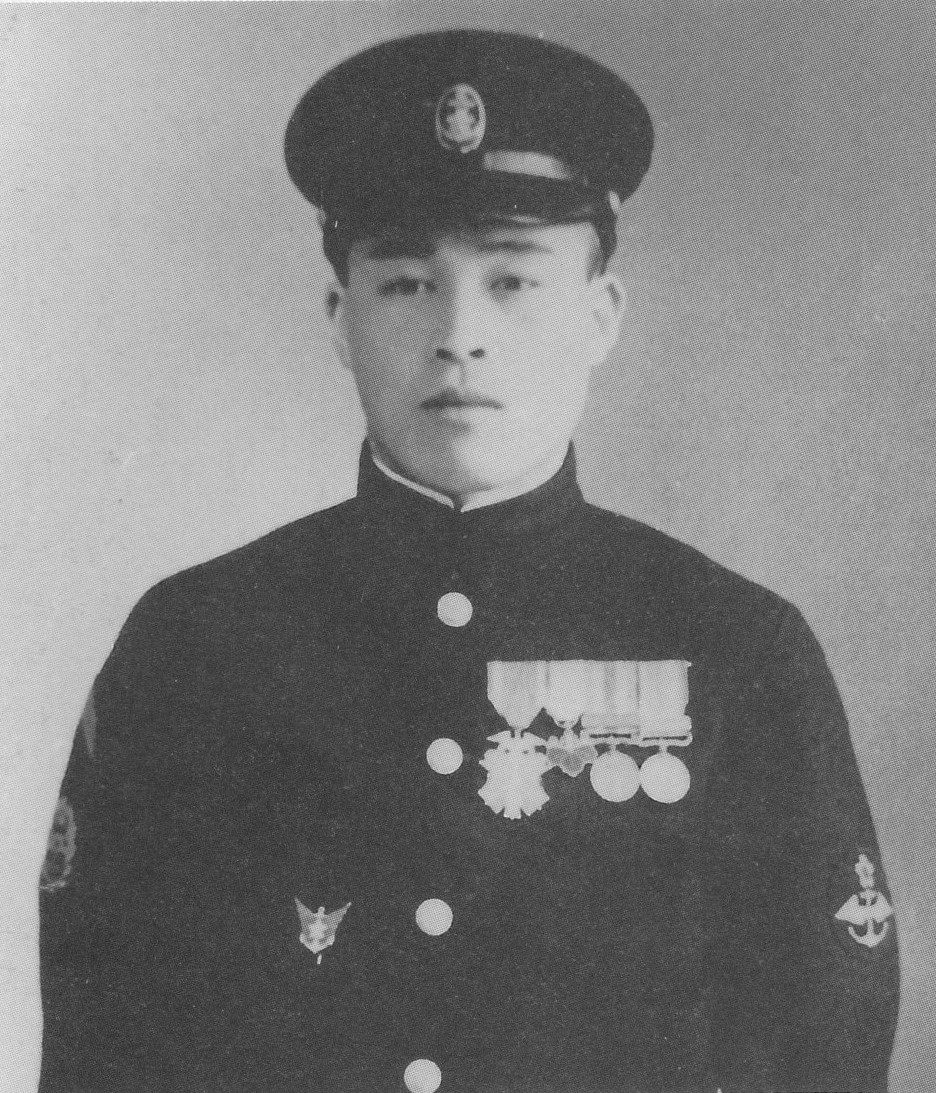
- Born: 1916; Yamanashi Prefecture, Japan
- Died: 26 October 1942 (aged 25–26); South Pacific
- Military career
- Allegiance: Empire of Japan
- Branch: Imperial Japanese Navy Air Service (IJN)
- Service years: 1933–1942
- Rank: Ensign
- Units: 13th Air Group; 12th Air Group; Akagi; Hōshō; Shōkaku
- Conflicts: Second Sino-Japanese War; World War II; Battle of Midway; Battle of the Eastern Solomons; Battle of the Santa Cruz Islands; Solomon Islands Campaign

Shigetaka Ōmori (大森 茂高, Ōmori Shigetaka; 1916 – 26 October 1942) was an officer and ace fighter pilot in the Imperial Japanese Navy (IJN) during the Second Sino-Japanese War and the Pacific theater of World War II. In aerial combat over China and the Pacific, he was officially credited with destroying 13 enemy aircraft.

== Early career ==
Shigetaka Ōmori enlisted into the Navy in May 1933 and graduated from the 33rd IJN enlisted pilot training class in September 1936. In February 1938, he was posted to the 13th Kōkūtai operating in central China. His first successful aerial combat was on 25 February 1938 over the city of Nanchang, where he shot down one aircraft. In March he was transferred to the 12th Air Group, which operated in the same area. In December he was first transferred to the carrier Akagi and then to several land-based units in Japan. At the beginning of the Pacific War, he was assigned to the aircrew complement of the aircraft carrier Hōshō.

== Pacific War ==
In May 1942, Petty Officer First Class Ōmori was transferred to the carrier Akagi and participated in the Battle of Midway. He flew the escort for the morning strike against Midway Island. On the way to the atoll, they were intercepted by a large group of Midway-based Marine fighters. In the following engagement, he was credited with destroying two enemy fighters. When he returned to Akagi, he was immediately sent back in the air to defend the IJN carriers against US Navy torpedo bombers. During the combat air patrol (CAP), he and his unit were credited with shooting down six enemy torpedo bombers. He landed on Hiryū after Akagi was hit by USN SBD Dauntless dive bombers. In the afternoon he took off from Hiryū to conduct CAP, but Hiryū too was hit he along with his unit commander Lieutenant Ayao Shirane were forced to ditch. They were picked up by a Japanese light cruiser.

After the Battle of Midway, Petty Officer Ōmori was transferred to the carrier Shōkaku. In August 1942, he participated during the Battle of the Eastern Solomons, where he was assigned to cover the strike force that attacked US carriers. The escort of nine Zeros was led by Lieutenant Yasuhiro Shigematsu. When they spotted the USN aircraft approaching the IJN fleet, Ōmori along with four other Zeros broke away from the strike force to attack the enemy. However, one of his wingmen, Petty Officer Third Class Sadamu Komachi, did not follow and stayed with Shigematsu.

In October 1942, Petty Officer Ōmori participated in the Battle of the Santa Cruz Islands where he and his wingman Petty Officer Komachi conducted CAP. While defending the IJN carriers against SBD Dauntless dive bombers from the carrier Hornet, Ōmori was killed in aerial combat while attempting to ram the leading bomber. They managed to account for four enemy dive bombers during their approach. He was posthumously promoted to Ensign.
