= Kaname Harada =

Japanese flying ace of World War II and anti-war activist

- 原田 要
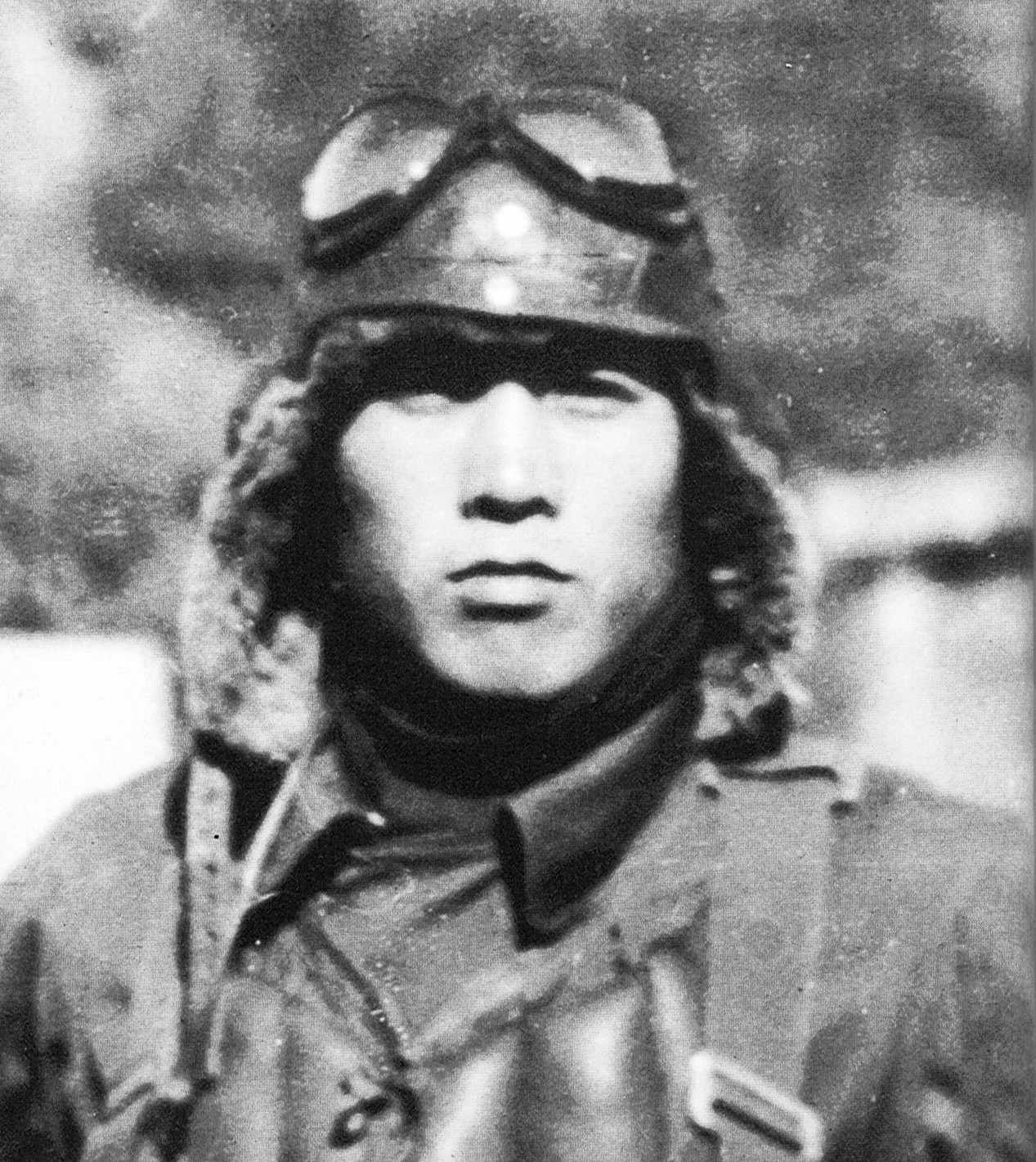
- Harada in 1943
- Born: 11 August 1916; Nagano Prefecture, Japan
- Died: 3 May 2016 (aged 99); Nagano, Nagano Prefecture, Japan
- Military career
- Allegiance: Empire of Japan
- Branch: Imperial Japanese Navy Air Service
- Rank: Lieutenant (junior grade)
- Conflicts: Second Sino-Japanese War; World War II; Pacific War
- Other work: Dairy farmer, kindergarten principal, anti-war activist

Kaname Harada (原田 要; 11 August 1916 – 3 May 2016) was a Japanese flying ace of World War II. He was credited with shooting down as many as 19 Allied aircraft between late 1941 and when he was himself downed in October 1942. After recovering from the injuries sustained in this incident, Harada served as a flying instructor for the remainder of the war.

Following the end of hostilities in 1945, Harada worked as a farmer, before founding a nursery for children in 1965 and later a kindergarten. He became an anti-war activist in 2001 and remained a prominent speaker until late in his life.

== Biography ==
=== Military service ===
Harada was born in the village of Asajawa in Nagano Prefecture on 11 August 1916. After completing school, he joined the Imperial Japanese Navy's naval infantry force in 1933, aged 17. He later transferred to the Navy's aviation branch, and graduated first in the 35th pilot training class in February 1937. Harada was posted to China in October that year during the Second Sino-Japanese War, but was not involved in any aerial combat. While in China he witnessed Japanese military personnel indiscriminately killing Chinese civilians in the mistaken belief that they were soldiers in disguise. In December, he took part in the attack on the USS Panay, which led to increased tensions with the United States. Harada was sent back to Japan in January 1938, and subsequently served in several training positions.

At the outbreak of the Pacific War, Harada was a Mitsubishi A6M Zero pilot assigned to the aircraft carrier Sōryū, which formed part of the 1st Air Fleet. In this role, he took part in the 1st Air Fleet's series of operations during the initial months of the war. On 7 December 1941, he flew protective patrols over the fleet during the attack on Pearl Harbor, and did not see any combat. Harada also escorted the aircraft which attacked the Australian port of Darwin on 19 February 1942. During the Indian Ocean raid, he was confirmed to have shot down three British fighters over Colombo on 5 April, and claimed another two as "probables". Four days later, he downed two British Bristol Blenheim light bombers which were attempting to attack the Japanese fleet.

During the Battle of Midway, Harada shot down either three or five American aircraft. He landed on the last surviving Japanese aircraft carrier, Hiryū, after Sōryū was sunk by United States aircraft. Harada was in the air at the time of Hiryū's sinking later in the battle and was rescued by a warship after ditching into the sea.

In July 1942, Harada was reassigned to the aircraft carrier Hiyō. In early October of that year, the carrier departed Japan to take part in the Guadalcanal Campaign. On 17 October, Harada formed part of the escort for a force of torpedo bombers which were attempting to attack targets on Guadalcanal. American Grumman F4F Wildcats attacked this force, and while Harada probably downed a Wildcat, he was shot in the left arm and his aircraft was badly damaged. His plane crash-landed near the Japanese base at Rekata Bay on Santa Isabel Island, and Harada had to dig himself out from underneath the wreckage of his plane with his bare hands. He was shot down by American Marine Corps ace Joe Foss. After walking through the jungle for several days he reached a midget submarine base where he recovered from malaria and dengue fever in addition to his injuries. Harada was later returned to Japan on board a hospital ship.

One of Harada's arms was badly injured in the crash, which ended his career as a combat pilot. He subsequently served as a flying instructor, and late in the war trained kamikaze pilots. He also said that he helped train pilots for the Mitsubishi J8M rocket plane that Japan was developing late in the war. By the end of hostilities, he held the rank of lieutenant (junior grade) and had flown for 8,000 hours. The number of aircraft Harada is credited with shooting down differs among sources; in 2011 Ikuhiko Hata, Yasuho Izawa and Christopher Shores wrote that he "was credited with nine confirmed victories", while in a 2015 New York Times article he said that he downed 19 Allied aircraft.

=== Later life ===
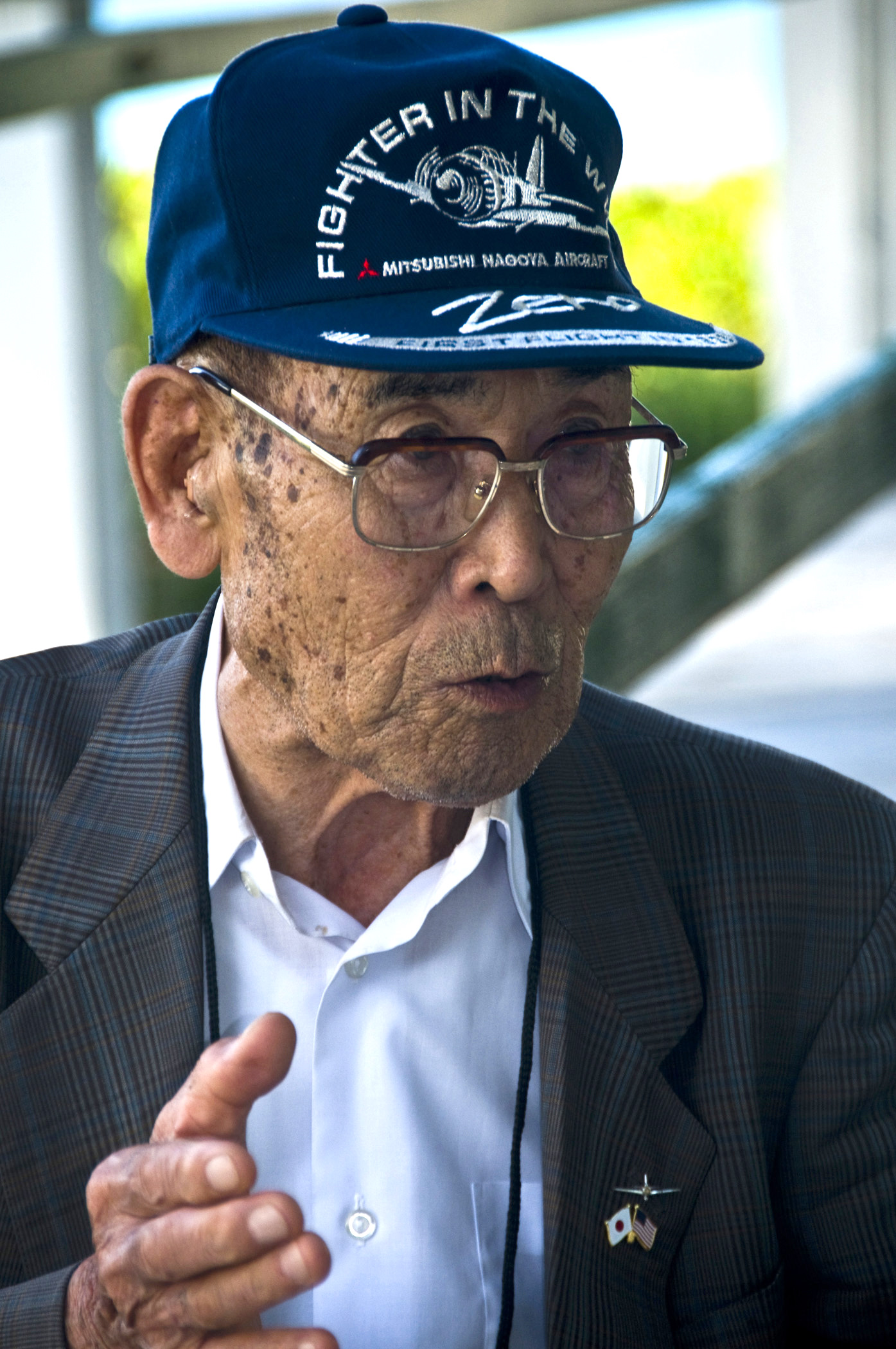
Harada in 2010

Following World War II, Harada initially worked as a dairy farmer, but suffered from nightmares in which he saw the faces of the airmen he had downed during the war. In 1965, he founded a nursery for children with his wife after she asked him "if you want to atone for the lives you have taken, what better way is there than to nurture new lives?" The couple opened a kindergarten in 1969. He continued as a principal of the kindergarten until his retirement. In a 2013 interview with The Australian Harada said:

The first incarnation of my life was as a ruthless killer. I still live with a sense of sin over those I killed. I chased them and shot them down—such a horrible thing to do. Now, I go to the kindergarten every day and interact with the children. I want to nurture kind and considerate hearts in all of them.

Harada also traveled to the United Kingdom and United States to meet some of the American and British airmen he had fought against, including the American ace Joe Foss who is believed to have been the pilot who shot down his plane. As part of his travels Harada visited Santa Isabel Island, where he located the wreckage of his fighter and brought a section of it back to Japan.

While initially finding it difficult to talk about his experiences, Harada became an anti-war activist in 2001 after hearing young Japanese people discuss the 911 terror "as if it were a harmless video game." In 2015, The New York Times reported that Harada, aged 98, was a "highly sought-after public speaker" who was motivated by a desire to pass on his experiences to younger generations of Japanese, who he believed were unaware of the nature of warfare. He opposed efforts by conservative members of the Japanese government to change the country's pacifist constitution, saying that "these politicians were born after the war, and so they don't understand it must be avoided at all costs. In this respect, they are like our prewar leaders". A documentary named Each and Every Battlefield covering Harada's life was released in Japan in March 2015.

Harada died in Nagano on 3 May 2016. He was believed to have been the last surviving Japanese combat pilot who had taken part in the attack on the USS Panay and the attack on Pearl Harbor.
