= Ken'ichi Mishima =

Japanese social philosopher

- 三島憲一
- Born: 11 November 1942 (age 83); Tokyo, Japan
- Education: University of Tokyo
- Known for: Social and Contemporary Philosophy
- Scientific career
- Fields: Philosophy
- Workplaces: University of Tokyo; Chiba University; Tokyo Keizai University

Ken'ichi Mishima (三島 憲一, Mishima Ken'ichi; born November 11, 1942), is a Japanese social philosopher and university professor.

== About ==
Mishima studied philosophy, German and comparative literature and cultural studies at the University of Tokyo. Between 1970 and 1980 he spent several years in Germany as a scholarship holder of the DAAD and the Alexander von Humboldt Foundation. From 1994 to 1995 he was a guest at the Wissenschaftskolleg zu Berlin. He was a professor at Osaka University until he moved to Tokyo University of Economics and Business as Professor of Social Philosophy and Contemporary Philosophy.

Mishima is considered an important mediator of the so-called critical theory in East Asia. Other focal points of his work are modern philosophy, above all the reception of the works of Friedrich Nietzsche and Walter Benjamin, the theory and empiricism of selective and multiple modernity as well as intellectual discourses in Germany.

== Awards and honors ==
- Philipp Franz von Siebold Prize (1987)
- Eugen and Ilse Seibold Prize (2001)
- Honorary doctorate from the Free University of Berlin (2011)
- Richard von Weizsäcker Fellow (2017)

== Selected bibliography ==
=== Books ===
- Ken'ichi, Mishima; Wolfgang, Schwentker (2015). Geschichtsdenken im modernen Japan: Eine kommentierte Quellensammlung (in German). IUDICIUM Verlag. ISBN 978-3-86205-044-4.
- Habermas, Jurgen; Mishima, Ken'ichi; Suzuki, Tadashi; OÌ, Atsuko (2010). ああ、ヨーロッパ (in Japanese). 岩波書店. ISBN 978-4-00-022063-7.
- Marx, Karl Heinrich; Imamura, Hitoshi; Mishima, Ken'ichi; Tatsumi, Shinji; Hosomi, Kazuyuki; Muraoka, Shin'ichi; Kosuda, Ken; Yoshida, Tooru (2005). フランスの内乱・ゴータ綱領批判・時局論 (in Japanese). 筑摩書房. ISBN 978-4-480-40116-8.
- Mishima, Ken'ichi (2006). 現代ドイツ: 統一後の知的軌跡 (in Japanese). 岩波書店. ISBN 978-4-00-430994-9.
