= Kenji Morozumi =

Japanese baseball player and coach (born 1969)

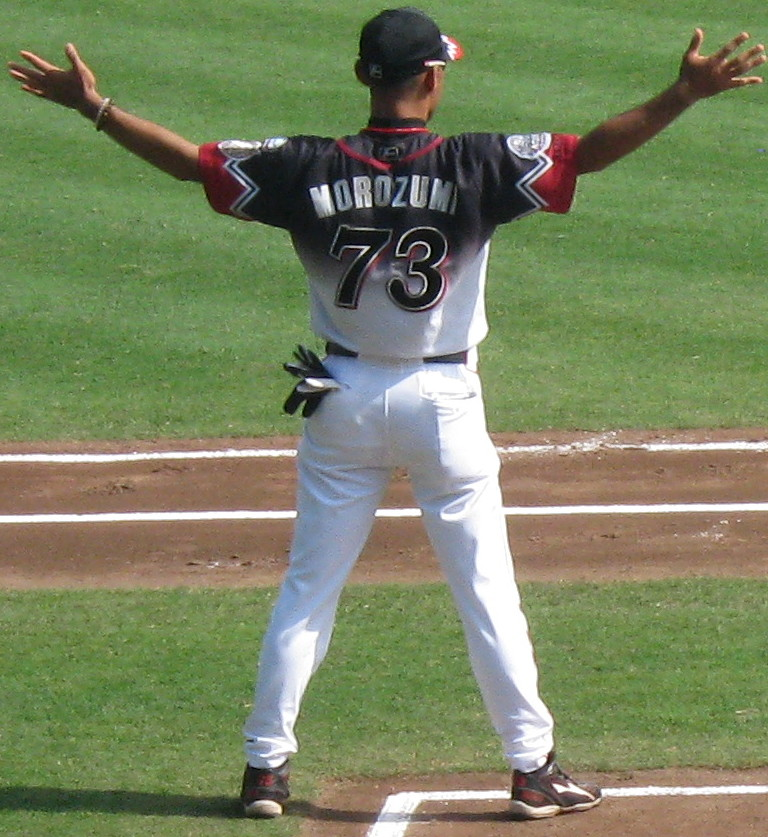

Chiba Lotte Marines – No. 83
- Outfielder / Coach
- Born: May 29, 1969 (age 57); Aizuwakamatsu, Fukushima, Japan
- Batted: Left Threw: Right

NPB debut
- April 13, 1994, for the Chiba Lotte Marines

Last NPB appearance
- September 24, 2006, for the Chiba Lotte Marines

NPB statistics (through 2006 season)
- Batting average: .263
- Hits: 691
- RBIs: 153
- Stolen bases: 103
- Stats at Baseball Reference

Teams
- As player: Chiba Lotte Marines (1994–2006); As coach: Chiba Lotte Marines (2007–2010, 2018–present)
- Last updated on: September 24, 2018

Kenji Morozumi (諸積 兼司, Morozumi Kenji; born May 29, 1969), nicknamed "Moro", is a former Nippon Professional Baseball outfielder and the current coach of the Chiba Lotte Marines.
