= Kenji Ohmori =

Japanese physicist and chemist

Kenji Ohmori (大森 賢治, Ōmori Kenji; born November 10, 1962 in Kumamoto City) is a Japanese physicist and chemist. National Institutes of Natural Sciences, Japan (NIMS), Institute for Molecular Science (IMS)

== Education and career ==
- 1987 Graduated from Faculty of Engineering, The University of Tokyo
- 1992 Ph. D, The University of Tokyo
- 1992 Research Associate, Tohoku University
- 2001 Associate Professor, Tohoku University
- 2003 Full Professor, IMS
- 2007–2010 Director, Laser Research Center for Molecular Science, IMS
- 2010–present Chairman, Department of Photo-Molecular Science, IMS
- 2004–2005 Visiting Professor, Tohoku University
- 2007–2008 Visiting Professor, Tokyo Institute of Technology
- 2009–2011 Visiting Professor, The University of Tokyo
- 2014–2016 Visiting Professor, University of Strasbourg
- 2012–present Visiting Professor(Humboldt Awardee), University of Heidelberg

== Research ==
Kenji Ohmori has succeeded in designing and visualizing spatiotemporal images given by the interference of matter waves of atoms in a molecule with picometer and femtosecond resolution [1,2]. The precision of this processing is the highest to date, higher than that of the current nanotechnology by three orders of magnitudes. This ultrahigh-precision processing has been implemented with the temporal oscillations of laser electric fields engineered with attosecond precision and imprinted on the matter waves of atoms and electrons in a molecule. He has utilized this technique to develop a molecular computer in which a single 0.3-nanometer-size molecule can calculate 1000 times faster than the current fastest supercomputer [3,4]. He has also developed an ultrafast quantum simulator that can simulate non-equilibrium dynamics of quantum many-body systems in one nanosecond, introducing a novel concept where he has combined his ultrafast coherent control with attosecond precision and ultracold atoms cooled down to temperatures close to absolute zero[5].

== Honors and awards ==
- 1998 Award by Research Foundation for Opto-Science and Technology
- 2007 JSPS Prize
- 2007 Japan Academy Medal
- 2008 Norman Hascoe Distinguished Lecturer, University of Connecticut, USA
- 2009 Fellow of the American Physical Society
- 2012 Humboldt Prize
- 2017 Matsuo Foundation Hiroshi Takuma Memorial Prize
- 2018 Commendation for Science and Technology by the Minister of Education, Culture, Sports, Science and Technology of Japan
- 2021 National Medal with Purple Ribbon
