= Kenji =

Kenji may refer to:

- Kenji (given name), a masculine Japanese given name, and list of people and characters with this name
- Kenji (era), a Japanese era spanned from 1275 to 1278
- Kenji (manga) (拳児), a 1980s manga by Ryuchi Matsuda
- Gyakuten Kenji or Ace Attorney Investigations: Miles Edgeworth, a 2009 adventure video game
- J. Kenji López-Alt, an American chef and food writer
- "Kenji", a song on Fort Minor's 2005 album The Rising Tied

== See also ==
- Genji (disambiguation)
