= Yamamoto =

Yamamoto (written: 山本 lit. "base of the mountain") is the 9th most common Japanese surname.

== Notable people with the surname ==
- Akihiko Yamamoto (山本 明彦; born 1947), Japanese politician
- Akira Yamamoto (山本 旭; 1913–1944), Japanese World War II flying ace
- Anzu Yamamoto (山本 杏; born 1994), Japanese judoka
- Atsuji Yamamoto (山本 貴嗣; born 1959), Japanese manga artist and character designer
- Atsushi Yamamoto (山本 篤; born 1982), Japanese Paralympic athlete
- Ayano Yamamoto (山本 彩乃; born 1986), Japanese actress, voice actress and idol
- Azusa Yamamoto (山本 梓; born 1981), Japanese gravure idol, actress and television personality
- Yamamoto Baiitsu (山本 梅逸), Japanese painter
- Beatriz Yamamoto Cázarez (1957–2021), Mexican politician
- Chihiro Yamamoto (山本 千尋; born 1996), Japanese actress
- Chogoro Yamamoto (山本 長五郎; 1867–1936), birth name of Japanese yakuza boss Shimizu Jirocho
- Daiki Yamamoto (山本 大稀; born 1992), Japanese footballer
- Donald Yamamoto (born 1953), American diplomat
- Edward Yamamoto (山本 エドワード; born 1986), Filipino-born Japanese basketball player
- Eiichi Yamamoto (山本 暎一; 1940–2021), Japanese film director and screenwriter
- Emi Yamamoto (山本 絵美; born 1982), Japanese women's footballer
- Eric Yamamoto, American legal scholar
- Fujio Yamamoto (山本 富士雄; born 1966), Japanese footballer
- Fujiko Yamamoto (山本 富士子; born 1931), Japanese actress
- Gempō Yamamoto (山本 玄峰; 1866–1961), Japanese Zen Buddhist
- Genki Yamamoto (山本 元喜; born 1991), Japanese cyclist
- Go Yamamoto (山元 豪; born 1995), Japanese Nordic combined skier
- Yamamoto Gonnohyōe (山本 権兵衛; 1852–1933), Imperial Japanese Navy admiral and Prime Minister of Japan
- Guy Yamamoto (born 1961), American golfer
- Hideo Yamamoto (山本 英夫; born 1968), Japanese manga artist
- Hideo Yamamoto (karateka) (山本 英雄), Japanese karateka
- Hideomi Yamamoto (山本 英臣; born 1980), Japanese footballer
- Hikaru Yamamoto (山本 ひかる; born 1991), Japanese actress
- Hiro Yamamoto (山本 紘; born 1961), American bassist
- Hiroki Yamamoto (disambiguation), multiple people
- Hiromasa Yamamoto (山本 浩正; born 1979), Japanese footballer
- Hiromi Yamamoto (山本 宏美; born 1970), Japanese speed skater
- Hiroshi Yamamoto (disambiguation), multiple people
- Hiroto Yamamoto (山本 啓人; born 1988), Japanese footballer
- Hiroyuki Yamamoto (disambiguation), multiple people
- Hisashi Yamamoto (山本 尚; born 1943), Japanese organic chemist
- Hisaye Yamamoto (1921–2011), Japanese-American writer
- Yamamoto Hōsui (山本 芳翠; 1850–1906), Japanese painter
- Hōzan Yamamoto (山本 邦山; 1937–2014), Japanese shakuhachi player, composer and lecturer
- Ichita Yamamoto (山本 一太; born 1958), Japanese politician
- Ikuei Yamamoto (山本 郁榮; born 1945), Japanese sport wrestler
- Isoroku Yamamoto (山本 五十六; 1884–1943), Imperial Japanese Navy admiral killed during World War II
- Issei Yamamoto (山本 一清; 1889–1959), Japanese astronomer
- Yamamoto Jōtarō (山本 条太郎; 1867–1936), Japanese businessman and politician
- Julie Yamamoto, American politician
- Junichi Yamamoto (disambiguation), multiple people
- Junzo Yamamoto (山本 順三; born 1954), Japanese politician
- Kailer Yamamoto, (born 1998), American ice hockey player
- Kaito Yamamoto (山本 海人; born 1985), Japanese footballer
- Kajirō Yamamoto (山本 嘉次郎; 1902–1974), Japanese film director, screenwriter and actor
- Yamamoto Kakuma (山本 覚馬; 1828–1892), Japanese samurai
- Kanae Yamamoto (disambiguation), multiple people
- Kanichi Yamamoto (山本 寛一; 1879–1961), Japanese Bahá'í
- Kansai Yamamoto (山本 寛斎; 1944–2020), Japanese fashion designer
- Kansuke Yamamoto (山本 勘助; 1501–1561), Japanese samurai
- Kansuke Yamamoto (山本 悍右; 1914–1987), Japanese avant-garde artist, photographer, and poet
- Katsumi Yamamoto (racing driver) (山本 勝巳; born 1973), Japanese racing driver
- Katsumi Yamamoto (rowing) (山本 克美; born 1946), Japanese rower
- Kazunori Yamamoto (山本 一徳; born 1983), Japanese baseball player
- Kazutomi Yamamoto (山本 和臣; born 1988), Japanese voice actor and singer
- Kei Yamamoto (山本 圭; 1940–2022), Japanese actor
- Keiko Yamamoto (山本 圭子; 1940–2024), Japanese voice actress
- Keith Yamamoto (born 1946), American scientist
- Kenichi Yamamoto (disambiguation), multiple people
- Kenji Yamamoto (disambiguation), multiple people
- Yamamoto Kenkichi (山本 健吉; 1907–1988), pen name of Ishibashi Teikichi, Japanese writer and literary critic
- Kodo Yamamoto (山本 興道; born 1961), Japanese handball player
- Kohei Yamamoto (disambiguation), multiple people
- Koichi Yamamoto (山本 公一; 1947–2023), Japanese politician
- Koji Yamamoto (disambiguation), multiple people
- Koki Yamamoto (山本 幸輝; born 1990), Japanese rugby union player
- Kosuke Yamamoto (山本 康裕; born 1989), Japanese footballer
- Kotetsu Yamamoto (山本 小鉄; 1941–2010), Japanese professional wrestler
- Kozo Yamamoto (山本 幸三; born 1948), Japanese politician
- Kyoji Yamamoto (山本 恭司; born 1956), Japanese musician, singer-songwriter and record producer
- Linda Yamamoto (山本 リンダ; born 1951), Japanese singer and actress
- Mai Yamamoto (山本 麻衣; born 1999), Japanese women's basketball player
- Maika Yamamoto (山本 舞香; born 1997), Japanese actress, television personality and model
- Maria Yamamoto (山本 麻里安; born 1981), Japanese voice actress and singer
- Mariko Yamamoto (山本 万里子; born 1983), Japanese cricketer
- Masahiko Yamamoto (山本 雅彦; born 1956), Japanese speed skater
- Masahiro Yamamoto (disambiguation), multiple people
- Masahito Yamamoto (山本 正人; born 1978), Japanese rugby union player
- Masaki Yamamoto (山本 真希; born 1987), Japanese footballer
- Masaki Yamamoto (cyclist) (born 1996), Japanese cyclist
- Masakuni Yamamoto (山本 昌邦; born 1958), Japanese footballer and manager
- Masamichi Yamamoto (山本 雅道; born 1978), Japanese cyclist
- Masao Yamamoto (山本 昌男; born 1957), Japanese photographer
- Masanobu Yamamoto (山本 真伸; born 1949), Japanese rower
- Masashi Yamamoto (山本 政志; born 1956), Japanese film director
- Masashi Yamamoto (baseball) (山本 雅士; born 1994), Japanese baseball player
- Masaya Yamamoto (山本 真也; born 1991), Japanese footballer
- Masayoshi Yamamoto (山本 雅賢), Japanese artistic gymnast
- Mayuka Yamamoto (山本 茉由佳; born 2000), Japanese swimmer
- Mayumi Yamamoto (disambiguation), multiple people
- Mia Yamamoto, American activist
- Michiko Yamamoto (山本 道子; 1936–2026), Japanese writer and poet
- Michiko Yamamoto (screenwriter) (born 1979), Filipino screenwriter
- Mika Yamamoto (山本 美香; 1967–2012), Japanese journalist
- Mikio Yamamoto (山本 幹男; born 1944), Japanese scientist
- Minoru Yamamoto (山本 秀; 1912/1913 – 1996), Japanese classical composer
- Mirai Yamamoto (山本 未來; born 1974), Japanese actress
- Miyuu Yamamoto (山本 美憂; born 1974), Japanese sport wrestler and mixed martial artist
- Mizuki Yamamoto (山本 美月; born 1991), Japanese actress and model
- Mona Yamamoto (山本 モナ; born 1976), Japanese announcer
- Naoki Yamamoto (disambiguation), multiple people
- Naomi Yamamoto, Canadian politician
- Natsuko Yamamoto (山本 奈津子), Japanese actress
- Norifumi Yamamoto (山本 徳郁; 1977–2018), Japanese mixed martial artist and kickboxer
- Noriko Yamamoto (山本 憲子; born 1944), Japanese swimmer
- Norimichi Yamamoto (山本 義道; born 1995), Japanese footballer
- Nozomi Yamamoto (山本 希望; born 1988), Japanese voice actress
- Ren Yamamoto (山本 蓮; born 1997), Japanese footballer
- Richard K. Yamamoto (1935–2009), American physicist
- Rihito Yamamoto (山本 理仁; born 2001), Japanese footballer
- Riken Yamamoto (山本 理顕; born 1945), Japanese architect
- Rinichi Yamamoto (山本 麟一; 1927–1980), Japanese actor
- Ryo Yamamoto (山本 亮; born 1984), Japanese long-distance runner
- Ryohei Yamamoto (山本 領平; born 1974), Japanese R&B singer
- Ryoma Yamamoto (山本 凌雅; born 1995), Japanese triple jumper
- Ryosuke Yamamoto (disambiguation), multiple people
- Ryotaro Yamamoto (山本 凌太郎; born 1998), Japanese footballer
- Sachiko Yamamoto (山本 さち子; born 1970), Japanese alpine skier
- Sachiyo Yamamoto (山本 幸代; 1950–2013), Japanese women's basketball player
- Sadako Yamamoto (山本 定子; 1915-?), Japanese javelin thrower
- Sakon Yamamoto (山本 左近; born 1982), Japanese racing driver
- Saori Yamamoto (山本 早織; born 1985), Japanese gravure idol
- Yamamoto Satoru (山本 悟; 1925–2006), Grand Chamberlain of Japan
- Satoshi Yamamoto (山本 サトシ), Japanese manga artist
- Satsuo Yamamoto (山本 薩夫; 1910–1983), Japanese film director
- Sayaka Yamamoto (山本 彩; born 1993), Japanese singer, model, and idol
- Sayo Yamamoto (山本 沙代; born 1977), Japanese anime director
- Seigo Yamamoto (山本 聖剛; born 1971), Japanese drifting driver
- Seiichi Yamamoto (山本 精一; born 1958), Japanese musician
- Seiji Yamamoto (山本 征治; born 1970), Japanese chef
- Seiko Yamamoto (山本 聖子; born 1980), Japanese sport wrestler
- Seito Yamamoto (山本 聖途; born 1992), Japanese pole vaulter
- Shinji Yamamoto (disambiguation), multiple people
- Shinjiro Yamamoto (山本 信次郎; born 1877), Catholic Imperial Japanese Navy admiral
- Shin'ya Yamamoto (山本 真也; born 1971), Japanese shogi player
- Shizuka Yamamoto (山本 静香; born 1975), Japanese badminton player
- Shogo Yamamoto (山本 省吾; born 1978), Japanese baseball player
- Shohei Yamamoto (山本 翔平; born 1982), Japanese footballer
- Shouma Yamamoto (山本 匠馬; born 1983), Japanese actor
- Yamamoto Shōun (山本 昇雲; 1870–1965), Japanese artist
- Shoya Yamamoto (山本 翔也; born 1988), Japanese baseball player
- Shūgorō Yamamoto (山本 周五郎; 1903–1967), Japanese writer
- Shuto Yamamoto (山本 脩斗; born 1985), Japanese footballer
- Sōta Yamamoto (山本 草太; born 2000), Japanese figure skater
- Stênio Yamamoto (born 1961), Brazilian sport shooter
- Sumika Yamamoto (山本 鈴美香; born 1949), Japanese manga artist
- Tadamichi Yamamoto (山本 忠通; born 1950), Japanese diplomat
- Tadashi Yamamoto (1936–2012), Japanese internationalist
- Tadashi Yamamoto (athlete) (山本 忠司; 1925–1998), Japanese triple jumper
- Taisei Yamamoto (born 2001), Japanese freestyle skier
- Takahiro Yamamoto (山本 隆弘; born 1978), Japanese volleyball player
- Takashi Yamamoto (disambiguation), multiple people
- Takehiro Yamamoto (山本 剛大; born 1993), Japanese motorcycle racer
- Taku Yamamoto (山本 拓; born 1952), Japanese politician
- Tarō Yamamoto (山本 太郎; born 1974), Japanese politician and actor
- Taro Yamamoto (artist) (1919–1994), American artist
- Yamamoto Tatewaki (山本 帯刀; 1845–1868), Japanese samurai
- Yamamoto Tatsuo (山本 達雄; 1856–1947), Japanese politician
- Tetsuya Yamamoto (山本 哲哉; born 1985), Japanese baseball player
- Thomas Yamamoto (1917–2004), American artist
- Togo Yamamoto (山本 冬郷; 1886–?), Japanese actor
- Tojo Yamamoto (1927–1992), American professional wrestler
- Tomohiro Yamamoto (山本 朋広; born 1975), Japanese politician
- Tomohiro Yamamoto (山本 智大; born 1994), Japanese volleyball player
- Toshikatsu Yamamoto (山元 敏勝; 1929–2026), Japanese physician
- Toshiki Yamamoto (born 1991), Japanese weightlifter
- Toshio Yamamoto (disambiguation), multiple people
- Yamamoto Tsunetomo (山本 常朝; 1659–1719), Japanese samurai and author of the Hagakure
- Tsuyoshi Yamamoto (山本 剛; born 1948), Japanese jazz pianist and composer
- Wil Yamamoto (born 1974), Guamanian cyclist
- Yamato Yamamoto (山本 ヤマト; born 1983), Japanese manga artist
- Yasufumi Yamamoto (born 1971), Japanese tennis player
- Yasuhito Yamamoto (山本 康人; born 1957), Japanese manga artist
- Yasuichiro Yamamoto (山本 泰一郎; born 1961), Japanese anime director
- Yohji Yamamoto (山本 耀司; born 1943), Japanese fashion designer
- Yoko Yamamoto (山本 陽子; 1942–2024), Japanese actress
- Yoko Yamamoto (swimmer) (山本 容子; born 1958), Japanese swimmer
- Yoshihisa Yamamoto (disambiguation), multiple people
- Yoshiki Yamamoto (山本 祥輝; born 1994), Japanese footballer
- Yoshinobu Yamamoto (山本 由伸; born 1998), Japanese baseball player
- Yoshitaka Yamamoto (山本 善隆; born 1951), Japanese golfer
- Yōsuke Yamamoto (judoka) (山本 洋祐; born 1960), Japanese judoka
- Yudai Yamamoto (山本 雄大; born 1983), Japanese football referee
- Yūji Yamamoto (山本 有二; born 1952), Japanese politician
- Yukari Yamamoto (山本 由佳理; born 1981), Japanese field hockey player
- Yuriko Yamamoto (山本 百合子; born 1960), Japanese voice actress
- Yusuke Yamamoto (山本 裕典; born 1988), Japanese actor
- Yutaka Yamamoto (山本 寛; born 1974), Japanese anime director
- Yutaka Yamamoto (mathematician) (山本 裕; born 1950), Japanese mathematician
- Yuki Yamamoto (footballer) (山本 悠樹; born 1997), Japanese footballer
- Yuuki Yamamoto (model) (山本 優希; born 1987), Japanese fashion model
- Yuya Yamamoto (山本 優弥; born 1984), Japanese kickboxer
- Yūzō Yamamoto (山本 有三; 1887–1974), Japanese writer and playwright

== Fictional characters ==
- Yamamoto (Spriggan) (山本), a character in the manga series Spriggan
- Lt. Yamamoto, a character in the anime series The Irresponsible Captain Tylor
- Akane Yamamoto, a character in manga series Haikyū!!
- Aki Yamamoto, a character in the manga series Colorful
- Genryūsai Shigekuni Yamamoto (山本 元柳斎 重國), a character in the manga series Bleach
- Julie Yamamoto, a character in Ben 10
- Jun Yamamoto (山本 純), a character in the manga series S · A: Special A
- Kazuhiko Yamamoto (山本 和彦), a character in the novel Battle Royale
- Megumi Yamamoto (山本 芽), a character in the manga series S · A: Special A
- Takeshi Yamamoto (山本 武), a character in the manga series Reborn!
- Yohko Yamamoto (山本 洋子), a character in the anime series Starship Girl Yamamoto Yohko
- Yamamoto Yueniang, a character in the television series The Little Nyonya

== See also ==
- Yamoto (disambiguation)
