= Yamato =

Yamato (大和) was originally the area around today's Sakurai City in Nara Prefecture of Japan, which became Yamato Province and by extension a name for the whole of Japan.

Yamato is also the dynastic name of the ruling Imperial House of Japan.

== Japanese history ==
- Yamato people, the dominant ethnic group of Japan
- Yamato period, when the Japanese Imperial court ruled from Yamato Province
- Yamato Kingship, the government of the Yamato period
- Yamato clan, clan active in Japan since the Kofun period
- Yamato-damashii, the "Japanese spirit", or Yamato-gokoro, the "Japanese heart/mind"
- Yamato nadeshiko, the ideology of the perfect Japanese woman
- Yamato Takeru, a legendary Japanese prince of the imperial dynasty
- Yamato-e, classical Japanese painting
- Yamato-uta, alternative term for waka (poetry)
- Yamatai, ancient geographical term that may be associated with Yamato
- Daiwa (disambiguation), spelled using the same kanji as Yamato

== Places ==
=== Japan ===
- Yamato Province, former province, present-day Nara Prefecture
- Yamato, Fukuoka, a town in Fukuoka Prefecture
- Yamato, Fukushima, a town in Fukushima Prefecture
- Yamato, Gifu, former town now part of Gujo City
- Yamato, Ibaraki, a village in Ibaraki Prefecture
- Yamato, Kagoshima, a village in Kagoshima Prefecture
- Yamato, Kanagawa, a city in Kanagawa Prefecture
- Yamato, Kumamoto, a town in Kumamoto Prefecture
- Yamato, Niigata, former town now part of the city of Minamiuonuma
- Yamato, Saga, a town in Saga Prefecture
- Yamato, Yamaguchi, former town now part of Hikari
- Yamato, Yamanashi, a village in Yamanashi Prefecture
- Yamato River, a river in Nara and Osaka Prefecture
- Yamato Town, later renamed Wakō, Saitama
- Yamato Village, later renamed Higashiyamato, Tokyo

=== United States ===
- Yamato Colony, California, Japanese-American agricultural community
- Yamato Colony, Florida, former Japanese farm settlement

=== Antarctica ===
- Yamato Glacier
- Yamato Mountains

== Meteorites ==
- Yamato 691, 4.5-billion-year-old meteorite
- Yamato 791197, lunar meteorite found on Earth
- Yamato 000593, Martian meteorite found on Earth

== Ships ==
- Yamato (ship), several Japanese ships of this name
  - Yamato-class battleship
    - Japanese battleship Yamato
  - Japanese corvette Yamato
  - Yamato 1
  - 2GO Maligaya, a passenger ferry originally named Yamato

== Companies ==
- Yamato Life Insurance Company, Japan
- Yamato Transport, Japan, delivery service

== Animals ==
- Caridina multidentata (Yamato shrimp)

== Language ==
- Yamato kotoba, native Japanese language vocabulary

== People ==
- Yamato (surname)
- Yamato (given name)
- Yamato (wrestler), Japanese professional wrestler

== Entertainment ==
=== Anime and manga ===
- Space Battleship Yamato (disambiguation), Japanese TV, film and game series; Star Blazers in the West
- Yamato Takeru (anime)
- Yamato Takeru (film)
- Shiroi Senshi Yamato (Yamato, the White Fighter), a manga by Yoshihiro Takahashi
- Ishida Yamato, character in the Digimon franchise
- Takeru Yamato, character in the Eyeshield 21 manga
- Yamato (One Piece), a character in the One Piece manga

=== Other media ===
- Wadaiko Yamato, Japanese musical group
- Yamato (film), about the World War II battleship Yamato
- Space Battleship Yamato (2010 film), Japanese live action film
- Yamato Man, a robot master in Mega Man 6 and Mega Man Battle Network 3
- Yamato, the signature sword wielded by Vergil in the Devil May Cry franchise
- The Ark of Yamato, an area in the video game Ōkami
- The Yamato Perpetual Reactor, a particle accelerator from the video game Shin Megami Tensei IV
- Yamato, a battlecruiser cannon from the StarCraft franchise
- Takeshi Yamato, alter ego of Ultraman 80's TV show
- Yamato, sister ship to the USS Enterprise in the second season episode "Contagion" of Star Trek: The Next Generation
- "Yamato", a 2026 song by Sabaton
- Yamato, a Hero in Deadlock

== Publications ==
- Yamato (magazine), Italian propaganda magazine published during World War II

== See also ==
- An Investigation of Global Policy with the Yamato Race as Nucleus
- Yamoto (disambiguation)
- Daiwa (disambiguation)

Yamato may erroneously refer to the identically written:

- Daiwa, Hiroshima, now part of the city of Mihara, Japan
- Daiwa, Shimane, now part of the town of Misato, Japan
- Taiwa, Miyagi, a town in Miyagi Prefecture
- Daiwa Bank, now a part of Resona Holdings
