= Yamamoto (disambiguation) =

Yamamoto is a Japanese surname.

Yamamoto may also refer to:

== Places ==
- Yamamoto, Kagawa
- Yamamoto, Miyagi
- Yamamoto, Akita
- Yamamoto District, Akita

== Other uses ==
- Yamamoto (crater)

== See also ==
- Lubell–Yamamoto–Meshalkin inequality, in mathematics
- Yamoto (disambiguation)
