= 2017 Great North Run =

37th Great North Run
- Venue: Newcastle-upon-Tyne, England, United Kingdom
- Date: 10 September 2017

Medalists
gold medal	Mo Farah (59:23); Mary Keitany (1:07:32); Simon Lawson (42:46); Manuela Schär (53:38)

The 37th Great North Run took place on 10 September 2017 in Newcastle-upon-Tyne, England, United Kingdom with the men's and women's elite races and wheelchair races. Olympic and World champion Mo Farah, in his first race since ending his career on the track, won the Great North Run for the fourth year in a row. He became the first man to win the run four years in a row. Mary Keitany won the women's race for the third time in four years.

Briton Simon Lawson won the men's wheelchair race for the first time. Swiss Manuela Schär also won the women's wheelchair race for the first time. Schär also broke the course record held by Amanda McGrory, by finishing in a time of 48 minutes, 44 seconds.

After Jake Robertson finished 2nd in the men's elite race, he proposed to his girlfriend, fellow runner Magdalyne Masai.

== Results ==
=== Elite races ===
Elite Men

Position	Athlete	Nationality	Time
1	Mo Farah	United Kingdom	1:00:06
2	Jake Robertson	New Zealand	1:00:12
3	Feyisa Lilesa	Ethiopia	1:01:32
4	Zane Robertson	New Zealand	1:01:42
5	Hiroyuki Yamamoto	Japan	1:02:03
6	Dathan Ritzenhein	United States	1:02:49
7	Dewi Griffiths	United Kingdom	1:02:53
8	Bernard Lagat	United States	1:03:02
9	Tsegai Tewelde	United Kingdom	1:03:14
10	Koen Naert	Belgium	1:03:29
11	Mohamud Aadan	United Kingdom	1:04:26
12	Daichi Kamino	Japan	1:04:47
13	Chris Thompson	United Kingdom	1:05:28
14	Stephen Scullion	Ireland	1:05:52

Elite Women

Position	Athlete	Nationality	Time
1	Mary Keitany	Kenya	1:05:59
2	Vivian Cheruiyot	Kenya	1:07:44
3	Caroline Chepkoech Kipkirui	Kenya	1:09:52
4	Magdalyne Masai	Kenya	1:10:39
5	Betsy Saina	Kenya	1:11:25
6	Gemma Steel	United Kingdom	1:11:32
7	Lily Partridge	United Kingdom	1:12:10
8	Alyson Dixon	United Kingdom	1:12:29
9	Caryl Jones	United Kingdom	1:14:22
10	Rebecca Murray	United Kingdom	1:15:49
11	Elizeba Cherono	Kenya	1:16:17
12	Rebecca Hilland	United Kingdom	1:16:27
13	Fiona Brian	United Kingdom	1:18:16
14	Tracy Millmore	United Kingdom	1:18:46

=== Wheelchair races ===
Wheelchair Men

Position	Athlete	Nationality	Time
1	Simon Lawson	United Kingdom	44:22
2	Brent Lakatos	Canada	44:27
3	Josh Cassidy	Canada	44:57
4	Patrick Monahan	United Kingdom	46:16
5	Rafael Botello Jimenez	Spain	47:48
6	Bret Crossley	United Kingdom	48:47
7	Sean Frame	United Kingdom	51:05
8	Isaac Towers	United Kingdom	52:45
9	Ben Rowlings	United Kingdom	52:57
10	Sam Kolek	United Kingdom	55:00

Wheelchair Women

Position	Athlete	Nationality	Time
1	Manuela Schär	Switzerland	48:44
2	Samantha Kinghorn	United Kingdom	52:48
3	Liz McTernan	United Kingdom	1:24:15
