= 2014 New York City Marathon =

Footrace held in New York City

44th New York City Marathon
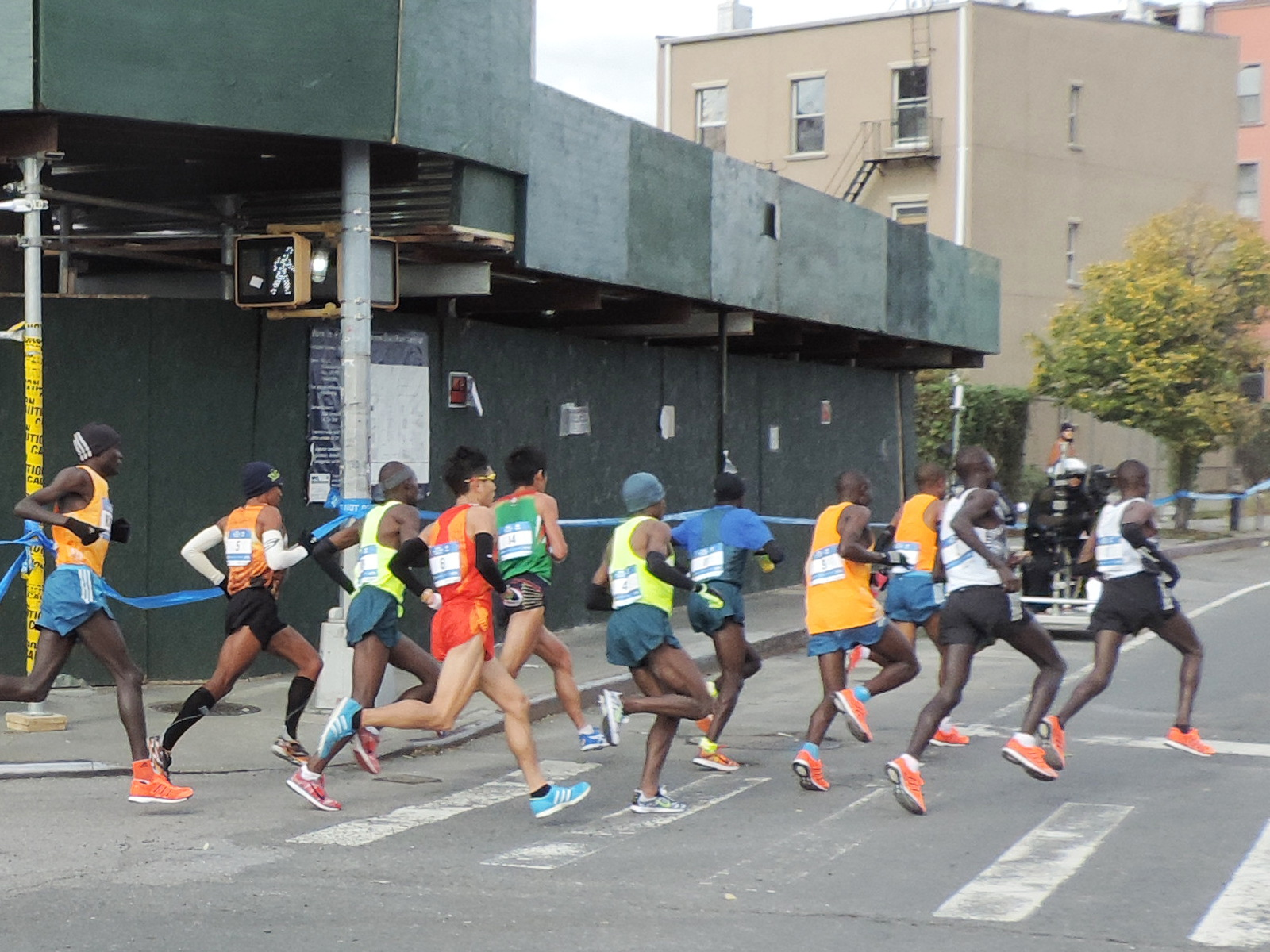
- Lead men in Greenpoint, Brooklyn
- Location: New York City, New York
- Date: November 2

Champions
- Men: Wilson Kipsang Kiprotich (2:10:59)
- Women: Mary Jepkosgei Keitany (2:25:07)
- Wheelchair men: Kurt Fearnley (1:30:55)
- Wheelchair women: Tatyana McFadden (1:42:16)

The 2014 New York City Marathon was the 44th running of the annual marathon race in New York City, New York, which took place on November 2. The elite men's race was won by Wilson Kipsang Kiprotich of Kenya with a time of 2:10:59 and the women's race by Mary Jepkosgei Keitany, also of Kenya, with a time of 2:25:07.

It was the largest marathon ever, with a record number of 50,869 starters. With 50,564 finishers (30,035 men and 20,398 women), having an average finish time of 4:34:45, the race also broke the record for most finishers.

The winds were exceptional this year, forcing race officials to move the start line of the wheelchair and handcycle competitions to the Brooklyn side of the Verrazzano–Narrows Bridge, shortening the course to 23.2 miles. Kurt Fearnley of Australia won the men's wheelchair division with a time of 1:30:55, earning his fifth New York City win. American Tatyana McFadden successfully defended her title with a time of 1:42:16 on the shortened course, and, as a result, has become not only the sole person to have ever won four major marathons in a year (Boston, London, Chicago, and New York City), but also the sole person to do so two years in a row.

This was the first marathon for which Tata Consultancy Services was the title sponsor. In addition, the one-millionth finisher of the New York City Marathon (since the marathon was first held in 1970), Katherine Slingluff of Brooklyn, completed her race with a time of 4:43:36.

== Results ==
=== Men ===
Position	Athlete	Nationality	Time
1st place, gold medalist(s)	Wilson Kipsang Kiprotich	Kenya	2:10:59
2nd place, silver medalist(s)	Lelisa Desisa	Ethiopia	2:11:06
3rd place, bronze medalist(s)	Gebregziabher Gebremariam	Ethiopia	2:12:13
4	Meb Keflezighi	United States	2:13:18
5	Stephen Kiprotich	Uganda	2:13:25
6	Geoffrey Mutai	Kenya	2:13:44
7	Masato Imai	Japan	2:14:36
8	Peter Cheruiyot Kirui	Kenya	2:14:51
9	Ryan Vail	United States	2:15:08
10	Nicholas Arciniaga	United States	2:15:39
11	Yuki Kawauchi	Japan	2:16:41
12	Lusapho April	South Africa	2:16:50
13	Birhanu Dare	Ethiopia	2:18:24
14	Micah Kogo	Kenya	2:18:36
15	Danilo Goffi	Italy	2:19:44
16	Stephen Shay	United States	2:19:47
17	Michael Kipyego	Kenya	2:20:00
18	Abebe Negash	Ethiopia	2:20:15
19	Harbert Okuti	Uganda	2:22:34
20	Aron Rono	United States	2:23:30
—	Brent Vaughn	United States	DNF
—	Tesfaye Assefa	Ethiopia	DNF
—	Khalid En Guady	Morocco	DNF

=== Women ===
Position	Athlete	Nationality	Time
1st place, gold medalist(s)	Mary Jepkosgei Keitany	Kenya	2:25:07
2nd place, silver medalist(s)	Jemima Sumgong	Kenya	2:25:10
3rd place, bronze medalist(s)	Sara Moreira	Portugal	2:26:00
4	Jeļena Prokopčuka	Latvia	2:26:15
5	Desiree Linden	United States	2:28:11
6	Firehiwot Dado	Ethiopia	2:28:36
7	Valeria Straneo	Italy	2:29:24
8	Bizunesh Deba	Ethiopia	2:31:40
9	Annie Bersagel	United States	2:33:02
10	Deena Kastor	United States	2:33:18
11	Ana Dulce Félix	Portugal	2:35:33
12	Edna Kiplagat	Kenya	2:36:24
13	Kara Goucher	United States	2:37:03
14	Lauren Kleppin	United States	2:39:13
15	Alia Gray	United States	2:39:43
16	Marcella Klimek	United States	2:40:00
17	Hilary Dionne	United States	2:40:54
18	Rocío Cantará	Peru	2:45:30
19	Kate Pallardy	United States	2:45:46
20	Katie Conlon†	United States	2:48:40
—	Rkia El Moukim	Morocco	DQ ^{[nb1]}
—	Blake Russell	United States	DNF

- † Ran in mass race
- ^{nb1} Rkia El Moukim of Morocco originally finished in sixth place in a time of 2:28:12 hours. Her performance was subsequently annulled due to doping as a result of abnormalities in her biological passport.

=== Wheelchair men ===
Position	Athlete	Nationality	Time
1st place, gold medalist(s)	Kurt Fearnley	Australia	1:30:55
2nd place, silver medalist(s)	Ernst van Dyk	South Africa	1:30:56
3rd place, bronze medalist(s)	Tomasz Hamerlak	Poland	1:30:56
4	Masazumi Soejima	Japan	1:30:57
5	Kota Hokinoue	Japan	1:30:57
6	Pierre Fairbank	France	1:30:59
7	Josh George	United States	1:33:09
8	Denis Lemeunier	France	1:33:36
9	Hiroyuki Yamamoto	Japan	1:33:53
10	Jorge Madera Jimenez	Spain	1:34:08

=== Wheelchair women ===
Position	Athlete	Nationality	Time
1st place, gold medalist(s)	Tatyana McFadden	United States	1:42:16
2nd place, silver medalist(s)	Manuela Schär	Switzerland	1:43:25
3rd place, bronze medalist(s)	Wakako Tsuchida	Japan	1:44:49
4	Amanda McGrory	United States	1:52:40
5	Sandra Graf	Switzerland	1:52:40
6	Christie Dawes	Australia	1:52:41
7	Susannah Scaroni	United States	1:57:55
8	Shelly Woods	United States	2:03:15
9	Chelsea McClammer	United States	2:03:17
10	Arielle Rausin	United States	2:12:07

=== Handcycle men ===
Position	Athlete	Nationality	Time
1st place, gold medalist(s)	Alfredo De Los Santos	United States	1:17:28
2nd place, silver medalist(s)	Ludovic Narce	France	1:17:28
3rd place, bronze medalist(s)	Stephane Massard	France	1:24:53
4	Samuel Spencer	United States	1:27:21
5	Mike Murphy	United States	1:27:33

=== Handcycle women ===
Position	Athlete	Nationality	Time
1st place, gold medalist(s)	Helene Hines	United States	2:04:45
2nd place, silver medalist(s)	Ashli Molinero	United States	2:07:30
3rd place, bronze medalist(s)	Rosalie Ames	United States	3:54:47
4	Nadine McNeil	United States	4:16:22
5	Selvie Mulaj	United States	5:56:33
