= List of ships named Yamato =

Several ships have been named Yamato (大和 / ヤマト):

- Japanese corvette Yamato, corvette of the Katsuragi-class corvette, launched in 1885 and used as a prison from 1935. Sunk by a typhoon in 1945.
- Yamato-class battleship, a class of 2 Japanese battleships and an aircraft carrier of World War II
  - Japanese battleship Yamato, lead ship of the Yamato class, named after Yamato Province
- Yamato Maru, originally the Italian ship Giuseppe Verdi that was built in 1914 and transported thousands of Italians to Ellis Island; sold to the Japanese in the 1920s and renamed Yamato Maru, sunk by a US submarine in 1943 in the Philippines
- Yamato 1, the first working prototype of a ship with a magnetohydrodynamic drive in the early 1990s
- Ferry Yamato, a passenger ferry of Japanese ferry operator Hankyu Ferry and was sold to the Philippines in 2021, and renamed 2GO Maligaya

== Fictional ==
- Space Battleship Yamato
- Superbattleship Yamato

== See also ==
- Space Battleship Yamato (disambiguation)
- Yamato (disambiguation)
- List of ships named Musashi
