= Hiroyuki Yamamoto =

Hiroyuki Yamamoto may refer to:

- Hiroyuki Yamamoto (wheelchair racer) (born 1966), Japanese wheelchair athlete
- Hiroyuki Yamamoto (runner), Japanese competitor in events such as the 2016 New York City Marathon
- Hiroyuki Yamamoto (footballer) (born 1979), Japanese footballer
- Hiroyuki Yamamoto (composer) (born 1967), Japanese composer
