= Daiwa =

Daiwa may refer to:

Places:

- Daiwa, Hiroshima, a former town in Kamo District, Hiroshima, Japan
- Daiwa, Shimane, a former village in Ōchi District, Shimane, Japan

Companies and related:

- Daiwa Securities Group, a Japanese security brokerage
- Resona Holdings (formerly Daiwa Bank Holdings), a Japanese bank holding company
- Daiwa House, a Japanese homebuilder
- The Daiwa Anglo-Japanese Foundation, a United Kingdom-based charity
- Daiwa Adrian Prize, awarded by the Daiwa Anglo-Japanese Foundation
- Globeride (formerly Daiwa Seiko Corporation), a Japanese producer of fishing and outdoor equipment

Racehorses:

- Daiwa Major, a stallion thoroughbred racehorse between 2003 and 2007.
- Daiwa Scarlet, a mare thoroughbred racehorse from 2006 to 2008.
- Daiwa El Cielo, a mare thoroughbred racehorse between 2003 and 2005.

== See also ==
- Yamato
- Yamoto
