= Marketing and release of Royal Space Force: The Wings of Honnêamise =

Marketing and release of the 1987 anime film

Royal Space Force: The Wings of Honnêamise, written and directed by Hiroyuki Yamaga, was the 1987 debut work of anime studio Gainax. While in creative terms the film was described by its executive producer, president of Bandai Makoto Yamashina, as "pure moviemaking" and having been made "without compromise", its marketing and release plans, under the advertising department of its distributor Toho-Towa, were outside the control of Gainax, and both Gainax and Yamashina acknowledged continuing clashes over these aspects; approximately half of the 800 million yen spent on the film was allocated to advertising and distribution rather than on direct production expenses.

Investor wishes and uncertainty about Royal Space Force's financial prospects prompted a protracted conflict over the film's name that led to it eventually being rebranded as The Wings of Honnêamise for its theatrical release. Gainax successfully argued against the film being cut substantially in length; however the movie itself was then advertised in a deceptive manner that misrepresented its actual content and attempted to suggest it was reminiscent of Hayao Miyazaki's 1984 film Nausicaä of the Valley of the Wind despite both Gainax and Bandai stating its difference. A lavish publicity campaign culminated in a one-night "world premiere" showing of the film on February 19, 1987, at Mann's Chinese Theatre in Hollywood; the event was organized for the benefit of promoting the movie in Japan, yet showed not the Japanese version of the film but an English-dubbed version localized under the name Star Quest, recalled in 2021 by a Bandai executive as "hated".

Upon its release to Japanese theaters on March 14, 1987, Royal Space Force failed to make back its costs at the box office, but eventually became profitable in Japan through home video sales. The film was not officially released to the English-language market until 1994, when a new dubbed version, closer to the original Japanese script but itself controversial, toured art house movie theaters and film festivals before being released to home video in 1995. In the years since the film has been re-issued in various formats including DVD, Blu-ray, HD DVD, and 4K.

== Marketing and release ==
=== Marketing ===
==== Changing the film title ====
"Royal Space Force was put into production at the very height of the first surge in [anime] video sales, when a studio's ownership of an all-new product, deeply ingrained in the newfound market of adult fans and active fandom, made 'by fans for fans', was immensely tempting. One imagines that investors hoped to bootstrap a new Gundam or a new Yamato out of nothing, which might have explained the enthusiasm during production for a possible movie sequel or television spin-off. (Note: Okada describes the idea for a TV anime series spinoff as originating from a split at Bandai between executives in one group who simply regarded the film as a loss for the company and wished to move on, and those in another group who believed it could still eventually become a successful investment. Around June of 1987, this "success" faction suggested to Okada and Yamaga that Royal Space Force could be developed into a TV anime series that would begin airing in April of 1988. Yamaga and Okada began to discuss the outline of a 52-episode weekly series that would expand the background events of the film's story. In the outline, the space program itself would not get underway within the TV series until the fall, several months into the show; it would be preceded by a major plot event, the first nuclear test within the alternate world of Royal Space Force, giving military significance to the development of the rocket as a possible delivery system. Yamaga desired that the nuclear test storyline be featured in an August episode, to coincide with the anniversary of the end of the Second World War. At the time, Okada compared the outline's structure to the approach taken in Isao Takahata's 1976 3000 Leagues in Search of Mother, itself a one-year series where the eponymous search does not begin until the fourth month. As the planning for the TV series consisted only of conversations, Okada felt he could not say how serious Yamaga was about the show, but in retrospect compared Yamaga's ideas for episodes peripheral to the main narrative to Shin Takahashi's Saikano, as well as to Cowboy Bebop, whose episodes Okada described as "branches and leaves" that enriched the main storyline. Okada commented that at some point the TV proposal faded away within Bandai without his knowledge, and he and Yamaga continued to discuss the series idea for a time until they later became aware it was no longer under actual consideration.) However, as the footage of Royal Space Force neared completion in late 1986, and was found to be inconveniently free of many merchandising spin-off opportunities, there were signs among the investors and sponsors of cold feet."

In a 2013 survey of the last century of the anime industry, Jonathan Clements devotes three pages to a case study of the distribution and exhibition issues surrounding Royal Space Force, describing "outrageous attempts" by the film's financial backers "to 'fix' the ailing film project", not by changing the film itself, but through a deceptive marketing campaign that began with "prolonged arguments over a sudden perceived need to rename it". The project had been pitched, developed, and approved for production under the name Royal Space Force; Okada remarked that, to Gainax, it was "its one and only title". All Nippon Airways, one of the film's sponsors, however desired that the title include the word "wings", while Bandai favored that the title should use the form "Something of Something," on the reasoning that the last big anime hit had been called Nausicaä of the Valley of the Wind. Over the course of 1986, more than 20 other titles for the film had been suggested to Gainax by outside parties, including Space • Love • Story, Myth of Passion, Young Morning Star Shirotsugh, Spirits of Fire, Song of Icarus, Parallel Zone 1987, and Zero Vertex. As Royal Space Force "was 'not sexy enough'" and Riquinni was "conveniently female," the initial push was to use the title (The) Wings of Riquinni.

Although the plan to make Royal Space Force had been known around the anime industry since mid-1985, the official announcement of the film was not made until June 4, 1986 in a press conference held at the prestigious Imperial Hotel in Tokyo. Ryuichi Sakamoto, who was the only member of Royal Space Force's main staff known to the general public spoke at the event, remarking that Royal Space Force would be his third film soundtrack and that its details reminded him of one of his favorite movies, Blade Runner. (Note: Sakamoto had sampled Blade Runner earlier that year for the track "Broadway Boogie Woogie" on his album Futurista.) The announcement at the Imperial Hotel used Royal Space Force as the main title of the film, with (The) Wings of Riquinni as a smaller subtitle; privately, Yamaga objected strongly to the subtitle, pointing out the purpose of the film was to expand the audience's view of the world, and that he did not want a title that focused on one character; therefore, if a second title was absolutely required, he suggested it use Honnêamise after the name of the kingdom in which most of the film's events takes place. As 1986 drew to a close, the battle over the film's final name could be traced through updates on the project in the anime press; in the October 1986 issue of The Anime, just half a year before the film's release to Japanese theaters, the movie logo was still listed as it had appeared at the June announcement, with a large Royal Space Force above a smaller (The) Wings of Riquinni. In the following month's issue, the logo no longer contained (The) Wings of Riquinni, and now read The Wings of Honnêamise~Royal Space Force, with Royal Space Force moved to the bottom, but both titles at equal size. By the December 1986 issue, the logo had assumed its final theatrical release form, with Royal Space Force now smaller than The Wings of Honnêamise.

==== Conflict over film length ====
"Okada and the others are still young, after all. And that has its really good points, but it also means they're ignorant of the ways of this world. So this could be their last work. Simply put, they've made this from inside a world of their own, so if it's not a hit, their reputation will be trashed, and if it is a hit, there'll be pressure to do it again. In either case, they won't be able to do the kind of pure moviemaking the way they have up until now. So it's their last time in that sense. Next time in this business, I don't think they'll be squabbling with the advertising department of Toho-Towa any more, and they'll do better that way. But in order to do well, they're going to have to compromise on their purity [in the future]. So it's quite something that they made this movie without compromise."

— Makoto Yamashina, 1987

In a 2010 memoir, Okada reflected on the conflict, asserting that it had involved not only the title, but that at one point Bandai had also requested Gainax cut the film's length from two hours to 80 minutes. Okada considered that it had been a "natural" request from a sponsor's perspective, as a movie theater would give four daily showings to a two-hour film, but six if it were only 80 minutes, opening the possibility of 50% more ticket sales. At the time, however, Okada refused, arguing that the box office performance was not part of his job, and telling the theatrical distributor and Bandai in a meeting that if they wanted to cut the film by even 20 minutes, they might as well cut off Okada's arm. In retrospect, Okada felt that he had acted like a child, but that "creators are all children," and if they were making something new and interesting, then in the end everyone involved should profit; he acknowledged, however, that in the meantime it was the "grown-ups" who had to deal with the risks and problems along the way, yet to him, acting like such a "responsible adult" would have meant going along with a deceptive compromise and being just a chouseiyaku (fixer). Bandai company president Makoto Yamashina affirmed shortly before the film's release that he had indeed thought of cutting 20 minutes from the film: "There were about three weeks during which we considered cutting it. Toho-Towa was going through the same thing, but the process of deciding what [scenes] to cut began with conversations about why they shouldn't be cut. And afterwards, I thought, 'Ah, I get it now' and felt that I couldn't cut it. And with apologies toward Toho-Towa, to please go along with this ... For the sake of the box office, it could have worked at around 100 minutes, but if we cut the film at this stage, the whole objective of the movie flies out the window, and the hundreds of millions of yen spent on it have no meaning. So I apologized—I'll be responsible if it's not a hit, so please let me do it as it is."

Okada wrote of having later heard how "emotions were running high" on the Bandai side as well, to the extent of considering taking the project away from Gainax and giving it to another studio to finish, or even cancelling the film's release, despite the 360 million yen already spent on producing it. However, this would have required someone's "head to roll" at Bandai to take responsibility for the loss, which could mean Makoto Yamashina himself, who had announced Royal Space Force as his personal project durung the official press conference in June. Okada noted that the person caught in the middle was Shigeru Watanabe, who had supported the project from the beginning and had secured Bandai's funding for Gainax, but now found himself "forced into a very difficult position," becoming so depressed by the conflict that following the film's release, he took a year's leave of absence. Okada expressed great regret for what he described as his lack of kindness at the time toward Watanabe, on whom he had taken out his anger and sense of betrayal, but nevertheless did not regret his lack of compromise, believing that if he had given any ground, the film might have not been completed.

==== Misleading advertising campaign ====
Clements remarked, "the promotions unit did everything in their power to make Honnêamise appeal to precisely the same audience as Nausicaä, even if that meant misleading advertising," citing one example recalled by Okada as "the 'insect incident', in which the artist [Yoshiyuki] Sadamoto was commissioned to draw an image of a giant spider-beetle attacking the city from the film. The insect in question only appeared in the film as a finger-length child's pet, although the advert gave the impression that it would grow into a house-sized behemoth equivalent to the giant ohmu in Nausicaä. Okada was incensed, not only at the apparent conspiracy to mislead audiences about his film, but that the producers would assent to wasting the time of Sadamoto, who spent three days on the commission. Okada felt ... that, if he had three days to spare, he [as one of the film's animation directors] could have better utilised the time by correcting several problematic scenes in the film itself." Okada had earlier affirmed the deceptive marketing push in a 1995 interview: "Toho-Towa was the distributor of The Wings of Honnêamise, and they didn't have any know-how, or sense of strategy to deal with the film ... And they were thinking that this film must be another Nausicaä, because Nausicaä was the last 'big anime hit.' But when they finally saw Wings, they realized it was not another Nausicaä [PANICKED SCREAM] and they thought, 'Okay, okay ... we'll make it Nausicaä in the publicity campaign!" (Note: All-caps "[PANICKED SCREAM]" is in original sourced quotation.)

Yamashina had himself acknowledged that although Bandai's plan to sell one million tickets for the film at the box office was based on that having been the sales performance for Nausicaä, "the content of this work isn't like Nausicaä ... No one's ever done something like this before, so it's a great risk in that respect." In 2000, Akai recalled, "The PR department didn't really seem to understand the film. They have a tendency to make a new release interesting by making it appear similar to a film that was previously a hit." Yamaga remarked that, "There was no precedent in advertising a film like ours at the time. When they are asked what type of a film it is, they can only compare it to something like Nausicaä. It's actually completely different. But Nausicaä at least served as a reference when we were asked to describe our film. If it wasn't for that precedent, there would have been no reference point at all. We could never have explained why it was animated or why it was a theatrical release, or much of anything about it."

The national publicity campaign for the film now being promoted under the title The Wings of Honnêamise~Royal Space Force began on New Year's Day, 1987, including full-color newspaper and magazine ads, as well as TV commercials, with eventual placements in over 70 media outlets. As with the "insect incident," a frequent aspect of the marketing push involved taking images from the film and presenting them in ads as fantastical. Akai gives as one example the steam train on which General Khaidenn departs for the capital to seek funding; advertisements labeled it as a "bio-train". The official press kit for the theatrical release presented Riquinni and her book of scriptures as elements in a prophecy of salvation that drove the plot, describing the premise of the film as: "'... Through the guidance of a lass with a pure and untainted soul, those who are awakened shall take wing and rise to Heaven, taking in hand the Honnêamise holy book' ... Shirotsugh grew up to join the Royal Space Force, as did other youths as hot blooded and energetic as he. It was then that work began on a grand project to search space for the envisioned holy book that promises eternal peace to Honnêamise." The weathered standing stone seen briefly outside the church storeroom where Riquinni lives during the latter part of the story, while given no particular meaning in the film itself, was made into a major feature of the film's advertising, relabeled as a "Symbol Tower" that shines due to what ads described as a secret telepathic link born from the "passionate love" between Shirotsugh and Riquinni; one of the film's trailers opened with an image of the glowing "tower" struck by lightning, then rising through the clouds as Riquinni prays before it while Shiro gazes up beside her; a caption proclaimed, "A world of love and youth, containing electrifying romance!" The only dialogue spoken in the trailer, "Do you believe in the miracle of love?" said by Riquinni's voice actor, Mitsuki Yayoi, was not a line from the actual film, but referenced a catchphrase used in the advertising campaign.

=== Release ===
==== Japanese release ====
"We can't make any more movies on this level. It's not just the money, not just the passion, it's the way they put this together, piece by piece. It's not about whether the story is interesting or uninteresting. It's a matter of quality, and it's not possible to maintain this level. Or that may be the case. So I think they did a great job, and yet from a professional perspective, they've made something that's a problem. When you look at it from the viewpoint of the anime industry, it must be very difficult to make something on this level. I've recently come to understand just how demanding it was for them to put make this piece by piece. And once it comes out, it'll set a new standard, won't it? If whatever comes next doesn't equal or surpass it, then it'll be a regression in terms of quality ... Disney achieved the peak [in animation] 50 years ago. You can't surpass them. Even if Spielberg or someone like that tries, it would only be an extension of what Disney did, but it wouldn't surpass it. But perhaps this time Yamaga has shown us a different approach from Disney, another possibility. Whether or not it ends up making a major impact in animation, the possibility will remain. And that's why I think he's created something amazing."—Makoto Yamashina, 1987

"And then there's the matter of The Wings of Honnêamise, released through Toho. This is a movie that's come in for a lot of different praise, as well as criticism. However, it's a work that basically, I wish to support ... The question I raise though isn't so much about the film itself; it's about the core business thinking behind the release of this film. I was pleased to see Bandai enter into anime filmmaking. But why did they produce as their first film project a movie with no product development behind it, which, being a toy company, is their biggest strength? And why didn't they use a smaller budget, so as to make their profit at the box office? If their wish was to create a sustained filmmaking business, they should have aimed to make certain that their premiere release was a financial success by maximizing their commercial advantages on it. To be blunt, it was too risky a bet to have a movie like The Wings of Honnêamise be their first film. They should have made it their third or fourth."

— Tetsuo Daitoku, 1988

Makoto Yamashina, the executive producer of Royal Space Force, detailed his conflicted feelings toward the final work and its box office prospects in an interview conducted shortly before the film's release in Japan: "If I had understood their concept earlier, I think I would have done it a little differently ... What they were trying to express is [found within] a visual world, so there are things that aren't said in the script, that can't be expressed with dialogue. The concept of the film couldn't be expressed without going ahead and making it. And after that there are no fixes; you now have this world that's been created, the world of Honnêamise, and it can't be changed." When asked what changes he would have liked to have made, Yamashina answered, "The big difference from how I thought it was going to be was that their expression was so flat. I would have made everything a bit more emotional and expansive, like the rocket launch scene at the end. While I believe at the same time that this was one of the [filmmaking] methods employed by Yamaga and the others, nevertheless it's flat. Constantly. In the emotional sense. I was fine with the scenes, the concepts, the plot development, but I would express more emotion ..." Yamashina, citing the aerial action from Top Gun, 1987's highest-grossing film in Japan, felt that "movies these days are all about entertainment," whereas "How the protagonist lives—his way of life, feeling depressed, wondering if he's okay with himself. That part of life, from the best movies, that's what's missing. And I think Yamaga dared to do that part." Yamashina asserted that Honnêamise was so significant because it was "the first film made for this [young] generation by that generation," and related an incident where a friend of his who also "didn't understand [the film] at all" was bewildered at the reaction of a young girl sitting next to him at a test screening, whom he saw noisily "cackling with delight". His friend, said Yamashina, wondered if he was witnessing a "revolution in the film industry" that if it succeeded, would put an end to the previous generation of filmmaking.

To Yamashina, the contrast spoke to a paramount issue dating back to the original proposal for Royal Space Force—whether the creators were correct in their understanding of what their generation was truly looking for in a film; the pre-release research and test audience reactions had left Yamashina personally uncertain on this question: "I'm afraid that the theaters will be deserted, and no one will go to see the movie." On the other hand, Yamashina repeated his concern for the implications if the film did turn out to be a hit: "If this is the [new] line that Yamaga is setting out, then filmmakers in the future are going to have to follow this line," suggesting that the previous assumptions about movies "will all get blown away ... You won't be able to make [a hit movie for young people] unless you're of that same generation." Yamashina expressed the belief that directors the same age as himself such as Steven Spielberg and George Lucas could still connect with young audiences because "in America there isn't such a big gap" whereas "in Japan, the gap starts from around 25. There's a fault line between the generations" and that what Honnêamise was offering viewers was a new approach compared to Lucas and Spielberg, whose films he described as "entertainment, simple to grasp ... If it turns out that young people today are thinking along Yamaga's lines, at that level of sophistication, it's going to be very difficult [for other filmmakers]." Yamashina speculated on whether rapid generational change meant Yamaga should have made the movie when he was even younger in order to better connect with a teenage audience, remarking that the director first conceived the idea of the film at 19, but that the movie was not finished until he was 24. "It's hard for me to talk about the film like this, but regardless of whether or not it succeeds, it's a movie that I don't understand. Until it opens at the theater, we won't really know."

The world premiere of the film was held on February 19, 1987, at Mann's Chinese Theatre in Hollywood, California. Americans invited to the showing included anime fans from the Cartoon/Fantasy Organization, (Note: The Cartoon/Fantasy Organization (C/FO) has been described as "the first American anime club," founded in Los Angeles in 1977. The C/FO later expanded with chapters in multiple US cities before breaking up as a national organization in 1989; the Los Angeles and Cleveland chapters continued to hold local meetings under the C/FO name.) and several figures associated with U.S. science fiction cinema including The Terminator and Aliens actor Michael Biehn, as well as Blade Runner designer Syd Mead. The one-night showing was arranged for the Japanese media, with all Tokyo TV news shows covering the premiere; Bandai paid for 200 anime industry notables to attend as well. (Note: In a 2021 retrospective, the former head of the Gardena branch of the C/FO, David Riddick, remarked that the Star Quest event was "a major turning point" in the history of U.S. Renditions, a company co-founded by Riddick and Robert Napton that was a pioneer in the licensing of OVAs for the English-language anime fan market. Riddick explained that the Star Quest event brought the American fans and the Japanese creators and industry attending into direct contact, in particular those associated with Gainax, whom Riddick described as "a huge inspiration for us"; Riddick recalled meeting at Star Quest Hiroyuki Yamaga as well as Ichiro Itano, a key animator on Royal Space Force. US Renditions would release the first authorized English-language home video edition of a Gainax work, in January 1990, a subtitled VHS tape of Gunbuster vol. 1; Robert Napton noted it was in fact the first licensed English-subtitled anime home video release of any kind, beating AnimEigo's Madox-01 to market by only two weeks. C/FO co-founder Fred Patten, who in his own account gives release dates for the English Gunbuster of February and March 1990, affirmed in Animation Magazine that prior attempts by US Renditions to release anime had failed due to other Japanese studios backing out before signing a contract, but that then they "made contact with Bandai ... and with Gainax, Ltd., the studio that had created Gunbuster ... After that, things went more smoothly," remarking that the English script for Gunbuster was made in consultation with Toshio Okada.) Footage from the Hollywood event was incorporated into a half-hour Sunday morning promotional special, Tobe! Oneamisu no Tsubasa —Harukanaru hoshi no monogatari— ("Fly! The Wings of Honnêamise—Story of a Distant Star") that aired March 8 on Nippon TV, six days before the film's release in Japan. Although referred to in Japanese publicity materials as The Wings of Honnêamise~Royal Space Force's "American prescreening," the film was shown under the name Star Quest, and presented in an English dub remarked upon by both U.S. and Japanese anime magazines covering the event for its differences from the original film; in particular its use of "Americanized" names for the characters and changes to their motivations: as examples, in Star Quest, Riquinni, now known as "Diane," opposes the space project from the beginning, whereas Shirotsugh, now known as "Randy," is more positive toward it, while the superiors of General Khaidenn, now known as "General Dixon," wish to use the rocket launch not as a provocation for war, but as a peace overture. In 2021 Bandai's Ken Iyadomi recalled, "it was localized in a totally American way, and everyone hated it."

The Wings of Honnêamise~Royal Space Force was released nationwide in Japan on March 14, 1987 through Toho's foreign film branch theaters; in some smaller cities, it was shown as a double feature with the 1985 made-for-television film Ewoks: The Battle for Endor. In a roundtable discussion in late spring following the film's release, co-producer Hiroaki Inoue observed that he could say the film "put up a good fight," arguing that the average theater stay for original anime films was four weeks, and Castle in the Sky had shown for five; in one theater, Royal Space Force had managed a seven-week engagement. In 2002, Takeda recalled, "Not a single theater cancelled its run, and in some locations, it actually had a longer run than initially planned ... The budget scale meant that reclaiming all the production costs (Note: Okada remarked that of the 800 million yen budget for the film, 360 million had been spent on the direct production costs; the remainder was for indirect costs including advertising (senden) expenses and distribution costs (kōgyō, "entertainment," a term here referring to booking advance blocs of screening dates for the film in theaters).) at the box office simply wasn't feasible." Clements commented, "Such a claim, however, obscures to a certain degree the goldrush tensions of the period, when Japan's booming bubble economy arguably resulted in more investors than a film warranted," contending that Royal Space Force might have been reasonably expected to make back its money on its initial release, had it been a more modestly-budgeted OVA as first conceived. On home video, the film's title was changed back to Royal Space Force, with The Wings of Honnêamise as a smaller subtitle, beginning with the 1990 Japanese laserdisc box set release. Although Gainax itself was nearly bankrupted by the project, Bandai was reported as having made back its money on the movie in September 1994, seven and a half years after its Japanese theatrical release; the anime continued to generate profit for them in the years to come. (Note: In an interview conducted in April 2003 (published in 2005), Yasuhiro Takeda remarked that when Gainax was planning Royal Space Force, there were people who asked whether they intended to secure rights in the work, but at the time it was more of a priority for Gainax to get the film made the way they wanted to than to insist on rights. Although Yamaga did retain the right to supervise the film, and Gainax was credited by Bandai for making it, Royal Space Force was financed through Bandai, to whom the contract gave 100% of the copyright; Takeda commented, "Contractually, [Royal Space Force] is not 'our thing.'")

==== English-language release ====
Toshio Okada, who had attended the Star Quest event together with writer/director Hiroyuki Yamaga, "concluded that a market did indeed exist in America for well-dubbed and subtitled animation," and after discussions with Bandai prepared a subtitled 16 mm film version of the film to be shown at the 1988 Worldcon in New Orleans, with the subsequent aim of making a "budget-priced videotape version" available in the United States. (Note: Animage carried a report of the Worldcon screening by Toren Smith, who commented that the previous screening of the film [i.e., Star Quest] "had not been well received," but that the newly subtitled film print of Honnêamise was "a big hit with the over 100 Japanimation (Note: Anime historian Fred Patten remarked that "Japanimation," a contraction of "Japanese animation," was a term commonly used in the 1980s by US fans of the medium, but that starting in the late 1980s and early 1990s, the Japanese term "anime" began to replace "Japanimation" in American fan discourse.) fans attending"; the print was reported as having been brought to the convention by Toshio Okada from Gainax and Minoru Takanashi from Bandai. Takanashi was at the time serving as co-producer on Mobile Suit Gundam 0080: War in the Pocket, which featured a screenplay by Hiroyuki Yamaga. Okada and Takanashi brought also Gainax and Bandai's post-Honnêamise anime project Gunbuster, which had its world premiere at the convention.) However, Royal Space Force did not receive an English-language commercial release until 1994, when a new English dub of the film was commissioned to Animaze and released by Manga Entertainment using its original 1987 Japanese theatrical release title, The Wings of Honnêamise: Royal Space Force. Previously active releasing anime in the United Kingdom, the dub of Honnêamise was Manga's debut project upon entering the US anime market.

The new English dub showed in over 20 movie theaters during 1994–95 in a 35 mm film version distributed by Tara Releasing (Note: Tara Releasing described itself as a California-based film distribution company [located in San Rafael] specializing in "the finest independent films, including innovative American features, award-winning documentaries, celebrated foreign titles, Japanese animation, and a variety of short subjects." Other anime titles featured by Tara in 1994 had been Giant Robo, Barefoot Gen, Urotsukidoji, and Macross II; at the time Tara was also distributing the Academy Award-nominated Czech live-action film The Elementary School as well as the documentaries 1991: The Year Punk Broke and Berkeley in the Sixties.) and in June 1995 the film was released by Manga Entertainment in separate dubbed and subtitled VHS versions followed in January 1997 by a bilingual closed-captioned laserdisc release by Manga Entertainment and Pioneer LDCA. Animerica, in a contemporary review, assessed the dub as "admirable in many respects," but remarked on several differences between the dialogue in the English subtitled and dubbed versions, noting that in the dubbed version of the film, Riquinni suggests that she herself is to blame both for Shirotsugh's attempt to rape her, (Note: The dubbed line was specifically cited in a negative review during the film's 1994–95 US theatrical release: "But she apologizes profusely: 'Maybe it was because I smiled at you. I'm so sorry. I can't believe I did that.' While not completely incomprehensible, The Wings of Honnêamise is certainly nonsensical, and, in the case of the aforementioned rape scene, patently offensive.") as well as for the earlier destruction of her home, and that in the dub, Shirotsugh does not ask Marty about the possibility of being the villain of one's own life story; the review argued that the subtitled version represents "a clearer presentation of the original ideas and personalities created by Hiroyuki Yamaga." (Note: When Yamaga himself was asked about the dub by Animerica in 1997, however, he affirmed that while he did not receive any translations of the Manga Entertainment version until after it was recorded and that, "how well it was translated or adapted—I don't understand any English, so I couldn't comment," he nevertheless praised the voice directing of the English dub; regarding controversy over its translation, Yamaga expressed the view: "I felt that some of the changes couldn't be helped. Some things just don't translate, and yes, some of the characters' motivations were changed a bit, but it's something to be expected and something that I accept. What I think is that everyone has their own areas of tolerance as you shift from the original work. When I used to watch American movies with subtitles, I'd read the subtitles and see that obviously it's not what's actually being said on-screen. But I had to accept it, because it can't be helped, and there's nothing I can do about it. So it didn't affect my enjoyment of the film overall. It comes down to what you're willing to accept.")

The 2000 release by Manga Entertainment on DVD, although praised for its commentary track with Hiroyuki Yamaga and Takami Akai, was at the same time severely criticized for its poor visual quality. (Note: "The Manga Entertainment DVD of Wings of Honneamise is widely reviled as a poster child for poor compression and authoring. From the horrific telecine to the double flagging, fake anamorphic and the ludicrous edge halos, many professionals I've shown it to couldn't believe it ever was released at all, as the VHS looks better in many cases ... the superb commentary track [is] worth tracking down that disc if only for that feature." "...the print Manga have sourced shows frequent signs of ageing. Dust, hairs, cigarette burns (as they are known in the industry) at reel changeovers, it is all here and all faults make frequent appearances. There really has been zero effort put into remastering this print which is a great shame, and the encoding is again quite poor, resulting in a picture that loses out on a lot of detail due to an overall softness (edging on blurriness) that kills the kind of clarity this film requires ... The most interesting extra feature Manga have presented us with here is an Audio Commentary ... I really cannot praise Manga enough for the effort they put into this excellent addition to the DVD") In 2007, Bandai Visual released a Blu-ray/HD DVD version to mark the film's 20th anniversary; this release used the audio of the 1997 Japanese edition of the film in which its sound effects were re-recorded in Dolby 5.1. Although containing a 20-page booklet with essays by Hiroyuki Yamaga and Ryusuke Hikawa, it lacks the commentary track of the 2000 Manga DVD release, and is now out of print. Maiden Japan re-released the movie separately on Blu-ray and DVD in 2013. In August 2022, Section23 Films announced a concurrent home video release with Bandai Namco Filmworks of a 4K remaster of the film supervised by director Hiroyuki Yamaga, containing as extras the 1987 Japanese production documentary Oneamisu no Tsubasa: Ōritsu Uchūgun—Document File, a version of the pilot film with an alternate audio track, and a collection of the film's background music.

The film's initial release in the United Kingdom on VHS in 1995 by Manga Entertainment was cut to remove the attempted rape scene; in a contemporary interview, BBFC examiner Imtiaz Karim indicated this was done voluntarily by Manga, so that the film, which had been certified for audiences 15 and up when shown in UK theaters, could receive the lower PG certificate when released on home video. The 2015 Blu-ray and DVD UK edition of the film from Anime Limited was released uncut with a 15 certificate.
