= Toshikatsu =

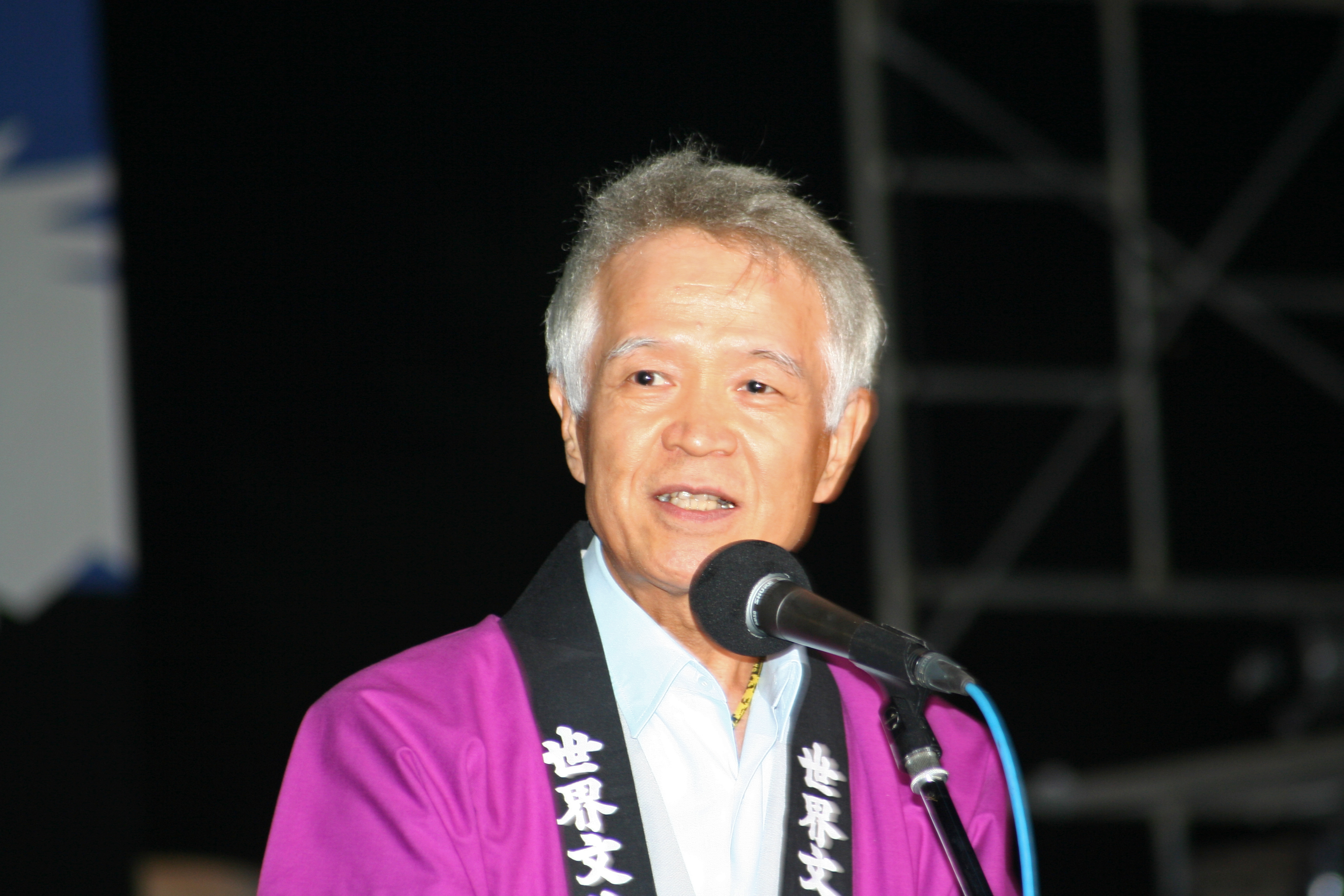
- Toshikatsu Iwami, Japanese politician
- Pronunciation: [toɕikatsɯ]
- Gender: Male

Origin
- Origin: Japanese
- Meaning: Different meanings depending on the kanji used

Other names
- Alternative spelling: Tosikatu (Kunrei-shiki) Tosikatu (Nihon-shiki) Toshikatsu (Hepburn)

Toshikatsu is a masculine Japanese given name.

== Written forms ==
Toshikatsu can be written using different combinations of kanji characters. Some examples:

- 敏克, "agile, overcome"
- 敏勝, "agile, victory"
- 敏活, "agile, alive"
- 俊克, "talented, overcome"
- 俊勝, "talented, victory"
- 俊活, "talented, alive"
- 利克, "benefit, overcome"
- 利勝, "benefit, victory"
- 利活, "benefit, alive"
- 年克, "year, overcome"
- 年勝, "year, victory"
- 寿克, "long life, overcome"
- 寿勝, "long life, victory"

The name can also be written in hiragana としかつ or katakana トシカツ.

== Notable people with the name ==
- Toshikatsu Doi (土井 利勝, 1573–1644), Japanese daimyō
- Toshikatsu Iwami (石見 利勝, born 1941), Japanese politician
- Toshikatsu Matsuoka (松岡 利勝, 1945–2007), Japanese politician
- Toshikatsu Nanbu (南部 利雄, 1724–1780), Japanese samurai and daimyō
- Toshikatsu Yamamoto (山元 敏勝, 1929–2026), Japanese physician
