= Mary Jepkosgei Keitany =

Kenyan long-distance runner (born 1982)

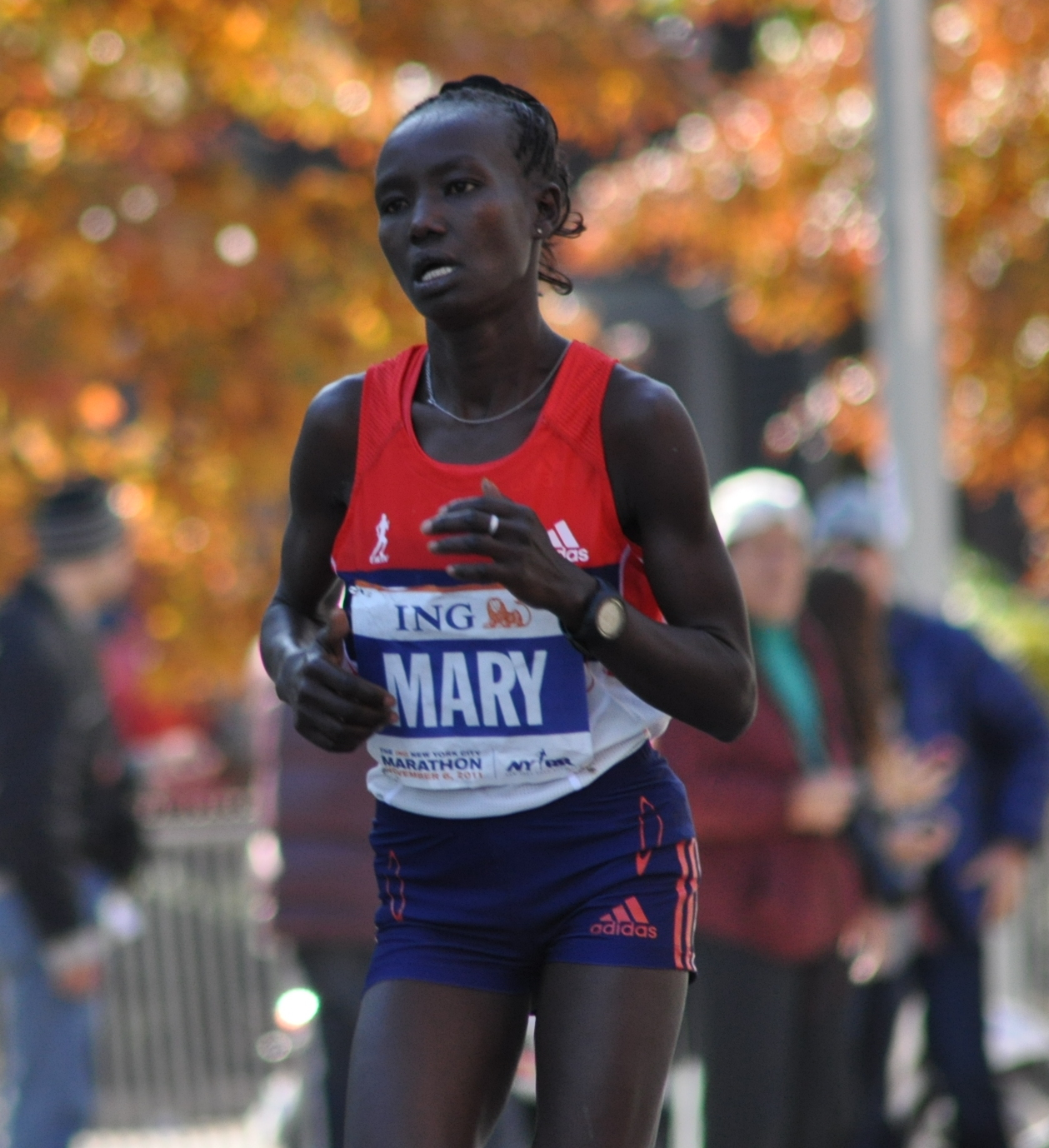
- Keitany at the 2011 New York City Marathon

Personal information
- Born: 18 January 1982 (age 44) Kabarnet, Baringo County, Kenya
- Weight: 42 kg (93 lb)

Sport
- Country: Kenya
- Sport: Athletics
- Event: Marathon
- Retired: Sep. 2021

Achievements and titles
- Personal bests: Half marathon: 64:55 (Ras Al Khaimah 2018); Marathon: 2:17:01 WR (Wo, London 2017)
Medal record
Women's athletics
Representing Kenya
World Half Marathon Championships
Gold medal – first place	2007 Udine	Team
Gold medal – first place	2009 Birmingham	Individual
Gold medal – first place	2009 Birmingham	Team
Silver medal – second place	2007 Udine	Individual
World Marathon Majors
Gold medal – first place	2011 London	Marathon
Gold medal – first place	2012 London	Marathon
Gold medal – first place	2014 New York	Marathon
Gold medal – first place	2015 New York	Marathon
Gold medal – first place	2016 New York	Marathon
Gold medal – first place	2017 London	Marathon
Gold medal – first place	2018 New York	Marathon
Silver medal – second place	2015 London	Marathon
Silver medal – second place	2017 New York	Marathon
Silver medal – second place	2019 New York	Marathon
Bronze medal – third place	2010 New York	Marathon
Bronze medal – third place	2011 New York	Marathon

Mary Jepkosgei Keitany (born 18 January 1982) is a Kenyan former professional long distance runner. She was the world record holder in a women-only marathon, having won the 2017 London Marathon in a time of 2:17:01. As of November 2022, she placed fifth on the world all-time list at the marathon and eleventh on the respective world all-time list for the half marathon.

Her former half marathon best of 1:05:50 (2011) remained the women's world record for three years. She also has held world bests at 10 miles (50:05 minutes), 20 kilometres (1:02:36), and 25 kilometres (1:19:53), all of which were set in road races. In August 2018, she was honored by the Shoe4Africa foundation who funded and built the Mary Keitany Shoe4Africa school in Torokwonin, Baringo County, Kenya. She and her husband Charles sit on the Shoe4Africa school board.

== Career ==
Born in Kabarnet, Baringo County, Keitany started running while in primary school. In 2002, she joined the Hidden Talent Academy.

=== 2006 ===
In January, she placed 21st in her first senior race at the Shoe4Africa 5 kilometre women's race.

=== 2007 ===
She won a silver medal at the World Road Running Championships, finishing second to Lornah Kiplagat who broke the world record.

=== 2009 ===
After a year out due to pregnancy, she returned to competition at the World 10K Bangalore in May. She set a new personal best but finished one second behind winner Aselefech Mergia.

In September, she won the Lille Half Marathon with a finish time of 1:07:00, which was the seventh fastest of all-time.

This performance qualified her for the World Half Marathon Championships in Birmingham, where she outpaced Aberu Kebede to win her first world championship, set a new personal best of 1:06:36, and broke the championship record. She won a second gold medal as part of the winning Kenyan squad in the team competition. Reflecting on the win, she noted, "It's my best ever time, so I'm so happy.... I had a baby just 1 year and 3 months ago." Her 15 kilometre interval time, 46:51 minutes, was faster than the world record of 46:55 held by Kayoko Fukushi of Japan; however, Keitany's time was not ratified as a new world record because of the lower elevation of the 15 kilometre mark compared to the race start. Her time was the second fastest ever in the half marathon (after Lornah Kiplagat). The half marathon time was a new African record, with the previous record of 1:06:44 hours set by Elana Meyer of South Africa in 1999. Keitany also beat the previous Kenyan record of 1:06:48 that she set in Udine two years earlier. The director of the New York City Marathon, Mary Wittenberg, suggested that she could become a world-beater over the full marathon distance in the coming years.

=== 2010 ===
She won the Abu Dhabi Half Marathon.

She also won the Berlin 25 kilometre race, setting a new world record of 1:19:53 hours. The previous record was set by Mizuki Noguchi of Japan in 2005. Keitany finished almost five minutes ahead of runner-up Alice Timbilili.

In preparing for the New York City Marathon, she won the Portugal Half Marathon in Lisbon in September, leading from the front to win largely uncontested in a time of 1:08:46.

In her debut at the New York City Marathon, she was among the leading three for much of the race but faded to finish third in a time of 2:29:01 hours.

=== 2011 ===
Keitany began the year in record-breaking form as she won the Ras Al Khaimah Half Marathon with a world record time of 1:05:50 hours. This marked the first time a woman had run the distance in under 1:06 hours on a non-aided course. She also set other records along the way, including a world record of 1:02:36 for 20 kilometres and world best times for 8 kilometres and 10 miles.

She then won the London Marathon in a time of 2:19:17, pulling away from the field at the 14-mile mark and becoming the fourth fastest woman ever over the marathon distance.

In September, she won the Portugal Half Marathon for the second time and improved upon her own course record with a winning time of 1:07:54 hours.

She was the pre-race favourite for the New York City Marathon, where she built a significant lead by the halfway point (running at more than four minutes faster than the course record). She slowed dramatically, however, in the second half of the race and was overtaken by Firehiwot Dado and Buzunesh Deba, leaving her in third place with a finishing time of 2:23:38 hours.

=== 2012 ===
She intended to improve her world record mark at the Ras Al Khaimah Half Marathon, but windy conditions slowed her to a finish time of 1:06:49 hours.

At the London Marathon, she broke Catherine Ndereba's African record with a winning time of 2:18:37 hours and became the third fastest woman ever at this distance.

At the Summer Olympics in London, she ran a fast pace among the lead pack until the 41 kilometre mark, where she fell behind to finish fourth.

=== 2013 ===
She announced her pregnancy at the start of 2013 and skipped that year's competitions.

=== 2014 ===
On 2 November, Keitany battled with eventual second-place finisher Jemima Sumgong to win the New York City Marathon in a time of 2:25:07.

=== 2015 ===
At the London Marathon, Keitany was one of the "Fantastic Four" of Kenyans (consisting of Keitany, Edna Kiplagat, Florence Kiplagat, and Priscah Jeptoo) who were expected to win the race and possibly challenge Paula Radcliffe's course record (and women's world record). Down the last stretch of the race, Keitany battled Ethiopian Tirfi Tsegaye, with Keitany finishing second in 2:23:40 hours, 18 seconds behind winner Tigist Tufa from Ethiopia. Keitany remarked after the race that she was affected by the wind and cold weather.

=== 2016 ===
Keitany won the New York City Marathon in 2:24:26 hours. Sally Kipyego finished second (2:28:01), with Molly Huddle in third (2:28:13). Keitany won the 2016 Bix 7 Road Race in Davenport, Iowa in 35:18 and set the course record for women.

=== 2017 ===
In April, Keitany won the London Marathon, setting a new world record (women only) at 2:17:01 hours. She bettered Radcliffe's record by 41 seconds, which she set at the 2005 London Marathon. Tirunesh Dibaba finished second, 55 seconds behind. (Radcliffe has run a faster time in a mixed gender event, but that is a separate record.) Her 1st half marathon split time was 1:06:54 hours.

Earlier in February the same year, Keitany finished the Ras Al Khaimah Half Marathon second (1:05.13) after Peres Jepchirchir, whose 1:05:06 finish time set a new world record. The third, fourth, and fifth-place finishers (Joyciline Jepkosgei, Jemima Sumgong, and Tirunesh Dibaba) also set new personal bests.

She won the TD Beach to Beacon 10k on 5 August 2017 in a course record time of 30:41 minutes. She improved the cr set at last year's run.

Keitany did not compete at the World Championships in London.

On 10 September 2017, Keitany won the 2017 Great North Run in 1:05:59, 20 seconds off her course record from 2014.

On 5 November 2017, she finished second at the New York City Marathon at a time of 2:27:54.

=== 2018 ===
On 4 November 2018, Keitany won the New York City Marathon in a time of 2:22:48, a time just 17 seconds off the course record. For the first half she needed 75:30 and the second 66:58, in a women-only race. Her 10 km interval times were 37:07, 35:02, 31:33, 31:47 and 7:19 for the last 2.195 km. Keitany's time between km 25 and km 35 was 30:53. Vivian Cheruiyot was the runner up in 2:26:02, and the previous year's winner Shalane Flanagan was in third place with 2:26:22.

=== 2019 ===
Keitany came second at the New York City Marathon behind half marathon world record holder and debutante Joyciline Jepkosgei in 2:23:32.

== Retirement ==
Mary Keitany announced her retirement on 22 September 2021 aged 39 years. Her retirement was occasioned by a hip injury she suffered during the 2019 London marathon, which restricted her training and performance.

== Personal life ==
She is married to another runner Charles Koech and gave birth to her first child, Jared, in June 2008, and her second child, Samantha, in April 2013. She stopped training and other sporting activities at the third month of pregnancy, and resumed when the babies were six months old. She trains in Iten and is managed by Gianni Demadonna.

== Major competition record ==
Representing Kenya
Year	Competition	Venue	Position	Event	Notes
2007	World Road Running Championships	Udine, Italy	2nd	Half marathon	1:06:48 NR
2009	World Half Marathon Championships	Birmingham, United Kingdom	1st	Half marathon	1:06:36 AR
2012	Olympic Games	London, United Kingdom	4th	Marathon	2:23:56
World Marathon Majors
2010	New York Marathon	New York, NY, United States	3rd	Marathon	2:29:01
2011	London Marathon	London, United Kingdom	1st	Marathon	2:19:19
2011	New York Marathon	New York, NY, United States	3rd	Marathon	2:23:38
2012	London Marathon	London, United Kingdom	1st	Marathon	2:18:37 AR
2014	New York Marathon	New York, NY, United States	1st	Marathon	2:25:07
2015	London Marathon	London, United Kingdom	2nd	Marathon	2:23:40
2015	New York Marathon	New York, NY, United States	1st	Marathon	2:24:25
2016	London Marathon	London, United Kingdom	9th	Marathon	2:28:30
2016	New York Marathon	New York, NY, United States	1st	Marathon	2:24:26
2017	London Marathon	London, United Kingdom	1st	Marathon	2:17:01 WR_{wo}
2017	New York Marathon	New York, NY, United States	2nd	Marathon	2:27:54
2018	London Marathon	London, United Kingdom	5th	Marathon	2:24:27
2018	New York Marathon	New York, NY, United States	1st	Marathon	2:22:48
2019	London Marathon	London, United Kingdom	5th	Marathon	2:20:58
2019	New York Marathon	New York, NY, United States	2nd	Marathon	2:23:32
Road races
2006	Seville Half Marathon	Seville, Spain	1st	Half marathon	1:09:06
2006	São Silvestre Olivais 10K	Lisbon, Portugal	1st	10 km	33:06
2007	Almeria Half Marathon	Almeria, Spain	1st	Half marathon	1:13:02
2007	Ivry-sur-Seine Humarathon	Paris, France	1st	Half marathon	1:08:36
2007	Puy-en-Velay 15K	Puy-en-Velay, France	1st	15 km	50:10
2007	Lille Half Marathon	Lille, France	1st	Half marathon	1:08:43
2009	Lille Half Marathon	Lille, France	1st	Half marathon	1:07:00
2009	Delhi Half Marathon	New Delhi, India	1st	Half marathon	1:06:54
2011	Ras Al Khaimah Half Marathon	Ras Al Khaimah, United Arab Emirates	1st	Half marathon	1:05:50 WR
2016	Beach to Beacon 10K	Cape Elizabeth, ME, United States	1st	10 km	30:45 CR
2017	Ras Al Khaimah Half Marathon	Ras Al Khaimah, United Arab Emirates	2nd	Half marathon	1:05:13
2017	Beach to Beacon 10K	Cape Elizabeth, ME, United States	1st	10 km	30:41 CR
2018	Ras Al Khaimah Half Marathon	Ras Al Khaimah, United Arab Emirates	2nd	Half marathon	1:04:55

=== World Marathon Majors results ===
World Marathon Majors	2010	2011	2012	2013	2014	2015	2016	2017	2018	2019
Tokyo Marathon	-	-	-	-	-	-	-	-	-	
Boston Marathon	-	-	-	-	-	-	-	-	-	
London Marathon	-	1st	1st	-	-	2nd	9th	1st	5th	5th
Berlin Marathon	-	-	-	-	-	-	-	-	-	
Chicago Marathon	-	-	-	-	-	-	-	-	-	
New York Marathon	3rd	3rd	-	-	1st	1st	1st	2nd	1st	2nd

== Personal bests ==
Distance	Time	Date	City	Notes
1500 metres	4:29.7	13 June 2003	Nairobi, Kenya	
5000 metres	16:29.4h	29 June 2006	Nairobi, Kenya	
10,000 metres	32:18.07	17 May 2007	Utrecht, Netherlands	
10 km	30:41	5 August 2017	Cape Elizabeth, ME, United States	
15 km	50:10	1 May 2007	Le Puy-en-Velay, France	
Half marathon	1:04:55	9 February 2018	Ras Al Khaimah, United Arab Emirates	
25 km	1:19:53	9 May 2010	Berlin, Germany	World best
30 km	1:39:11	17 April 2011	London, United Kingdom	
Marathon	2:17:01	23 April 2017	London, United Kingdom	Wo World record

Records
Preceded by (Netherlands) Lornah Kiplagat	Women's Half marathon World record holder 18 February 2011 – 16 February 2014	Succeeded by (Kenya) Florence Kiplagat
