= 2016 New York City Marathon =

Footrace held in New York City

46th New York City Marathon
- Location: New York City, New York
- Date: November 6

Champions
- Men: Ghirmay Ghebreslassie (2:07:51)
- Women: Mary Jepkosgei Keitany (2:24:26)
- Wheelchair men: Marcel Hug (1:35:49)
- Wheelchair women: Tatyana McFadden (1:47:43)

The 2016 New York City Marathon was the 46th running of the annual marathon race in New York City, New York, which took place on November 6. The elite men's race was won by Eritrea's Ghirmay Ghebreslassie in a time of 2:07:51 hours while Kenya's Mary Jepkosgei Keitany won the women's race in 2:24:26 for a third consecutive victory.

In the wheelchair races, Switzerland's Marcel Hug (1:35:49) and American Tatyana McFadden (1:47:43) won the men's and women's races, respectively. The handcycle races were won by Australia's Michael Taylor (1:23:06) and New Zealand's Tiffiney Perry (2:03:58).

A total of 48,468 runners finished the race, comprising 29,830 men and 18,638 women.

== Results ==
=== Men's race ===
Position	Athlete	Nationality	Time
1st place, gold medalist(s)	Ghirmay Ghebreslassie	Eritrea	2:07:51
2nd place, silver medalist(s)	Lucas Rotich	Kenya	2:08:53
3rd place, bronze medalist(s)	Abdihakem Abdirahman	United States	2:11:23
4	Hiroyuki Yamamoto	Japan	2:11:49
5	Shadrack Kiptoo Biwott	United States	2:12:01
6	Tadesse Yae Dabi	Ethiopia	2:13:06
7	Moses Ndiema Kipsiro	Uganda	2:14:18
8	Tyler Pennell	United States	2:15:09
9	Benjamin Payne	United States	2:15:46
10	Patrick Smyth	United States	2:16:34
11	Craig Leon	United States	2:17:14
12	Bado Musa Ido	Ethiopia	2:17:57
13	Christo Landry	United States	2:19:14
14	Brendan Martin	United States	2:19:34
15	Guteta Senbeto	Ethiopia	2:20:01
16	Mariano Mastromarino	Argentina	2:20:08
17	Matthew Llano	United States	2:20:15
18	Worknesh Seyoum	Ethiopia	2:20:54
19	Timothy Ritchie	United States	2:21:09
20	Harbert Okuti	Uganda	2:21:27
—	Lelisa Desisa	Ethiopia	DNF
—	Dathan Ritzenhein	United States	DNF
—	Ryan Vail	United States	DNF
—	Birhanu Dare	Ethiopia	DNF
—	Diriba Degefa Yigezu	Ethiopia	DNF
—	Jonathan Grey	United States	DNF

=== Women's race ===
Position	Athlete	Nationality	Time
1st place, gold medalist(s)	Mary Jepkosgei Keitany	Kenya	2:24:26
2nd place, silver medalist(s)	Sally Kipyego	Kenya	2:28:01
3rd place, bronze medalist(s)	Molly Huddle	United States	2:28:13
4	Joyce Chepkirui	Kenya	2:29:08
5	Diane Nukuri	Burundi	2:33:04
6	Aselefech Mergia	Ethiopia	2:33:28
7	Lanni Marchant	Canada	2:33:50
8	Neely Spence Gracey	United States	2:34:55
9	Sara Hall	United States	2:36:12
10	Ayantu Dakebo Hailemaryam	Ethiopia	2:37:07
11	Esther Atkins	United States	2:37:11
12	Dorothy McMahon	United States	2:38:46
13	Kellys Arias	Colombia	2:39:14
14	Gwen Jorgensen	United States	2:41:01
15	Laura Manninen	Finland	2:41:08
16	Kimberly Conley	United States	2:41:38
17	Kelly Calway†	United States	2:42:39
18	Emma Nordling	Sweden	2:45:22
19	Hilary Dionne	United States	2:45:31
20	Samantha Roecker	United States	2:45:34
—	Bizunesh Deba	Ethiopia	DNF
—	Annie Bersagel	United States	DNF
—	Brianne Nelson	United States	DNF
—	Etaferahu Temesgen Wodaj	Ethiopia	DNF
—	Megan Foster	United States	DNF

- † Ran in mass race

=== Wheelchair men ===
Position	Athlete	Nationality	Time
1st place, gold medalist(s)	Marcel Hug	Switzerland	1:35:49
2nd place, silver medalist(s)	Kurt Fearnley	Australia	1:35:49
3rd place, bronze medalist(s)	Josh George	United States	1:39:01
4	Ernst van Dyk	South Africa	1:40:08
5	Laurens Molina	Costa Rica	1:40:08
6	Simon Lawson	United Kingdom	1:40:12
7	Krige Schabort	United States	1:40:16
8	Aaron Pike	United States	1:43:40
9	James Senbeta	United States	1:44:27
10	Pierre Fairbank	France	1:44:27

=== Wheelchair women ===
Position	Athlete	Nationality	Time
1st place, gold medalist(s)	Tatyana McFadden	United States	1:47:43
2nd place, silver medalist(s)	Manuela Schär	Switzerland	1:49:28
3rd place, bronze medalist(s)	Amanda McGrory	United States	1:53:15
4	Susannah Scaroni	United States	1:58:16
5	Katrina Gerhard	United States	2:03:02
6	Jade Jones-Hall	United Kingdom	2:03:16
7	Arielle Rausin	United States	2:13:07
8	Mel Nicholls	United Kingdom	2:13:10
9	Eva Moral Pedrero	Spain	2:48:38
10	Mercedes Gómez	Venezuela	1:44:27

=== Handcycle men ===
Position	Athlete	Nationality	Time
1st place, gold medalist(s)	Michael Taylor	Australia	1:23:06
2nd place, silver medalist(s)	Vicente Yanguez	Spain	1:31:15
3rd place, bronze medalist(s)	Sergio Minas	Colombia	1:35:34
4	Leonardo Varon	Colombia	1:35:37
5	Glenn Hartrick	United States	1:35:38

=== Handcycle women ===
Position	Athlete	Nationality	Time
1st place, gold medalist(s)	Tiffiney Perry	New Zealand	2:03:58
2nd place, silver medalist(s)	Helene Hines	United States	2:24:06
3rd place, bronze medalist(s)	Ibadete Thaqi	United States	2:56:48
4	Devann Murphy	United States	3:06:53
5	Heather Carter	United States	3:21:11
