= Shinji Yamamoto =

Shinji Yamamoto may refer to:

- Shinji Turner-Yamamoto (born 1965), Japanese environmental artist
- Shinji Yamamoto (handballer) (born 1953), Japanese former handball player
