= Kanae Yamamoto =

Kanae Yamamoto may refer to:

- Kanae Yamamoto (artist) (1882–1946), Japanese artist
- Kanae Yamamoto (politician) (born 1971), Japanese politician
