= Yoshihisa Yamamoto =

Yoshihisa Yamamoto may refer to:

- Yoshihisa Yamamoto (scientist)
- Yoshihisa Yamamoto (wrestler)
