= Kenji Yamamoto =

Kenji Yamamoto is the name of:

- Kenji Yamamoto (composer, born 1958), known for Dragon Ball music
- Kenji Yamamoto (composer, born 1964), known for Metroid music
- Kenji Yamamoto (footballer) (born 1965), Japanese former footballer
