= Koji Yamamoto =

Koji Yamamoto may refer to:

- Koji Yamamoto (actor) (born 1976), Japanese actor
- Koji Yamamoto (baseball, born 1946), former Japanese All-Star baseball player
- Koji Yamamoto (basketball) (1952–2001), Japanese Olympic basketball player
- Koji Yamamoto (baseball, born 1951) (1951–2016), former Japanese professional baseball player
