= Naoki Yamamoto =

Naoki Yamamoto may refer to:

- Naoki Yamamoto (manga artist) (山本 直樹), Japanese manga artist
- Naoki Yamamoto (racing driver) (山本 尚貴, born 1988), Japanese racing driver
