= Mayumi Yamamoto =

Mayumi Yamamoto may refer to:

- Mayumi Yamamoto (actress) (born 1984), Japanese actress
- Mayumi Yamamoto (1958–2001), Japanese singer known professionally as Cindy
- Mayumi Yamamoto (speed skater) (born 1971), Japanese speed skater
- Mayumi Yamamoto (tennis), Japanese tennis player
