= Masahiro Yamamoto =

Masahiro Yamamoto may refer to:

- Masahiro Yamamoto (baseball) (born 1965), Japanese baseball player
- Masahiro Yamamoto (kickboxer) (born 1983), Japanese kickboxer
