= Junichi Yamamoto =

Junichi Yamamoto may refer to:

- Futatsuryū Jun'ichi (1950–2014), sumo wrestler, born Jun'ichi Yamamoto
- Junichi Yamamoto (singer) (born 1972), Japanese singer, actor and professional wrestler
