= Yamato (given name) =

- Gender: male
- Language: Japanese

Other names
- Variant form: 大和

Yamato (大和) is a Japanese masculine given name.

== Notable people ==
- Yamato (born 1981), Japanese wrestler
- Yamato Fushimi (伏見 大和; born 1991), Japanese volleyball player
- Yamato Ganeko (我如古 大和; born 1984), Japanese singer of the band Orange Range
- Yamato Kochi (河内大和; born 1978), Japanese actor
- Yamato Maeda (前田 大和; born 1987), Japanese baseball player

== Fictional characters ==
- Yamato Kazakiri (風切 大和), a character in the tokusatsu series Doubutsu Sentai Zyuohger
- Yamato Kisaragi, the Ultimate Inventor from Danganronpa Another Despair Academy
- Yamato Minazuki, a character in the manga Kamikaze Kaito Jeanne
- Yamato Daiwa, character in the manga Battle B-Daman
- Yamato "Matt" Ishida, character in the Digimon franchise
- Yamato (Naruto), a character in the manga Naruto
- Yamato Akitsuki, character in the manga Suzuka
- Yamato Kotobuki, character in the manga Gals!
- Yamato Sora, Yamato Tokio and Dr. Yamato, characters in the original Japanese dub of Flint the Time Detective
- Yamato Nakano, a character in the manga Loveless
- Yamato Agari, main character in Karakuri Dôji Ultimo
- Yamato Naoe, a character in Maji de Watashi ni Koi Shinasai! (Majikoi ~ Oh! Samurai Girls)
- Yamato, a character in the manga One Piece
- Yamato Sarukui (猿杙 大和), a character from Haikyu!! with the position of wing spiker from Fukurodani Academy
- Yamato Nikaidou, a character from Idolish7
- Yamato Tsubaki, a character from From Argonavis
- Yamato Ichidaiji, a character from Megaton Musashi
- Yamato Senguuji, a character from Inazuma Eleven GO
- Yamato, a character in the manga Heavenly Delusion
- Yamato, a playable character in the video game Deadlock
