= Yamato (surname) =

Family name

- Language: Japanese

Other names
- Variant forms: 大和; 山戸

Yamato (大和, 山戸) is a Japanese surname.

== Notable people ==
- Ami Yamato, Japanese YouTuber
- Yamato Gō (大和 剛; born 1969), a former sumo wrestler from Hawaii
- Hiroshi Yamato (born 1983), professional wrestler
- Waki Yamato (大和 和紀; born 1948), a manga author
- Yūga Yamato (大和 悠河; born 1977), the current top star of Takarazuka Revue
- Yūki Yamato (山戸 結希; born 1989), Japanese screenwriter and director

== Fictional characters ==
- Kansuke Yamato (大和 敢助), a police officer character in Detective Conan (Case Closed in English title)
- Kira Yamato (キラ・ヤマト), a TV character in the anime Mobile Suit Gundam SEED
- Maya Yamato (大和 麻弥), a character in the media franchise BanG Dream!
- Nadeshiko "Naddy" Yamato (大和 撫子), a character in the anime and manga series The 100 Girlfriends Who Really, Really, Really, Really, Really Love You
- Takeshi Yamato (矢的 猛), a TV character in the tokusatsu Ultraman 80
- Swordmaster Yamato, a character in Gag Manga Biyori
