= Rkia El Moukim =

Moroccan runner

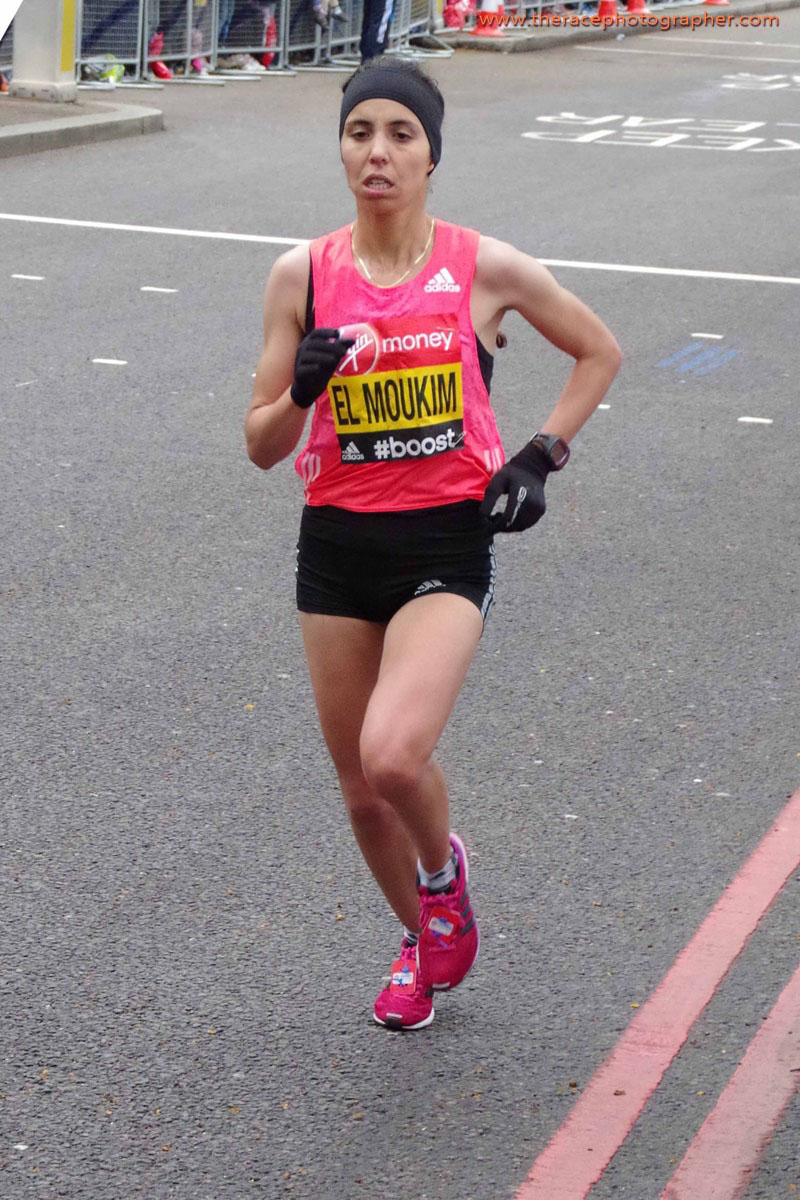
- El Moukim at the 2015 London Marathon

Personal information
- Nationality: Moroccan
- Born: 25 February 1988 (age 38) Guelmim, Morocco

Sport
- Sport: Track and field
- Event: Marathon

Rkia El Moukim (born 22 February 1988 in Guelmim) is a Moroccan long-distance runner.

== Career ==
In 2014, El Moukim won the Des Moines International Half Marathon as well as the Paris-Versailles Race, setting a record of 52 min 25s. She finished sixth in the 2014 New York Marathon and tenth in the 2015 London Marathon.

El Moukim qualified to represent Morocco in the 2020 Tokyo Summer Olympics, competing in the Women's Marathon event.
