= Hiroshi Yamamoto =

Hiroshi Yamamoto is the name of:

- Hiroshi Yamamoto (archer) (born 1962), Japanese Olympic archer
- Hiroshi Yamamoto (comedian) (born 1978), Japanese comedian from the comedy trio Robert (owarai)
- Hiroshi Yamamoto (politician) (born 1954), Japanese politician of the New Komeito Party
- Hiroshi Yamamoto (shogi) (born 1996), professional shogi player
- Hiroshi Yamamoto (sprinter) (1928-1990/1991), Japanese Olympic sprinter
- Hiroshi Yamamoto (judge) (born 1963), Japanese Supreme Court Justice
