= Molly Huddle =

American long-distance runner

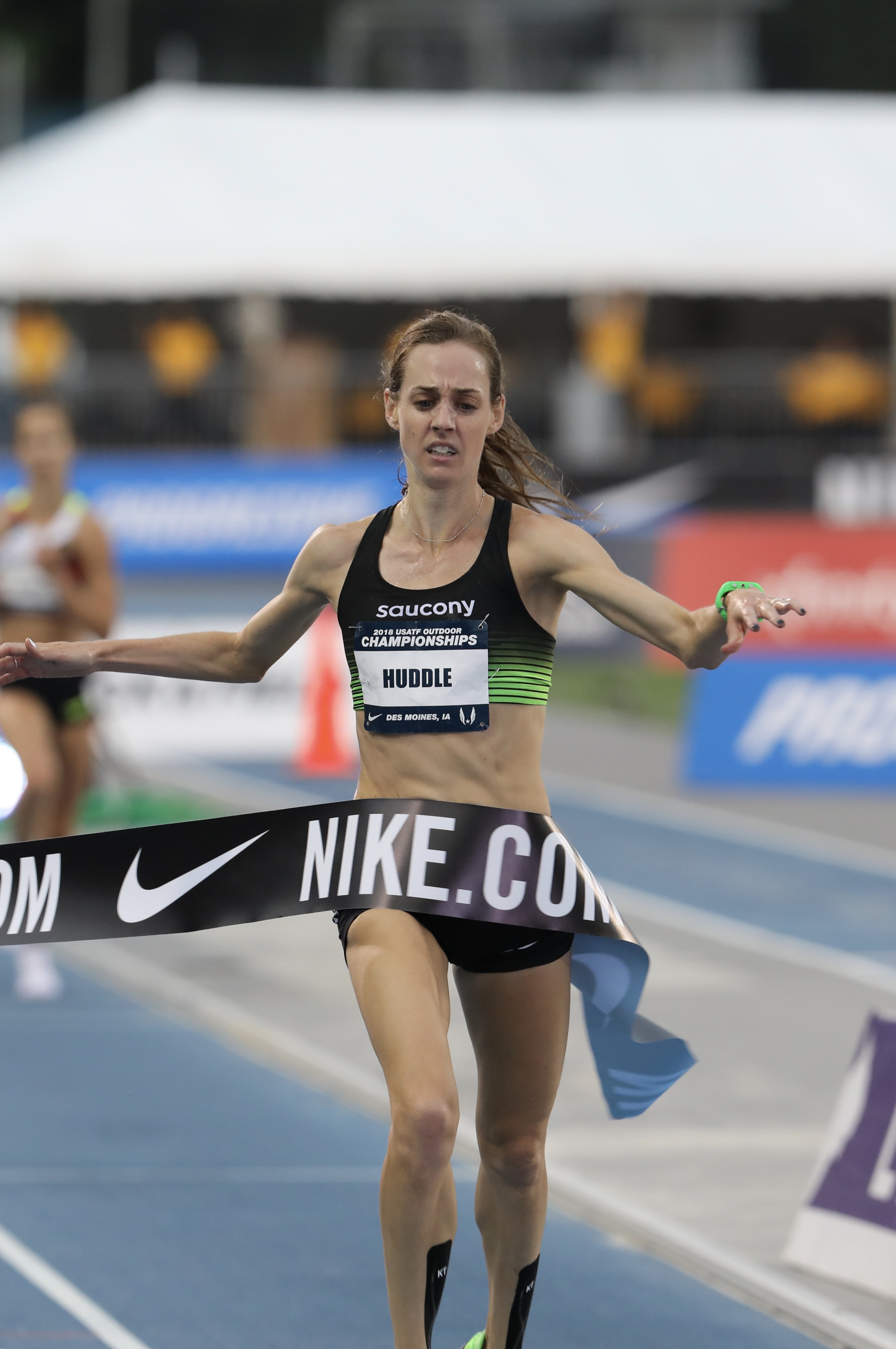
- Huddle in 2018

Personal information
- Nationality: American
- Born: August 31, 1984 (age 42)
- Home town: Elmira, NY
- Height: 5 ft 4 in (1.63 m)
- Spouse: Kurt Benninger
- Children: 2

Sport
- Country: United States
- Sport: Track and field
- Events: 5000 m, 10,000 m, Marathon
- College team: Notre Dame
- Club: Saucony
- Turned pro: 2007
- Coached by: Ray Treacy

Achievements and titles
- Olympic finals: 2012; 5000 m, 11th 2016; 10,000 m, 6th
- World finals: 2013; 5000 m, 6th 2015; 10,000 m, 4th 2017; 10,000 m, 8th 5000 m, 12th 2019; 10,000 m, 9th
- Highest world ranking: 4th (10,000 m)
- Personal bests: 1500 m: 4:08.09 (Lignano Sabbiadoro 2013); 3000 m: 8:42.99 (London 2013); 5000 m: 14:42.64 (Monaco 2014); 5 km: 14:50 AR (Boston 2015); 10,000 m: 30:13.17 AR (Rio de Janeiro 2016); Half marathon: 67:25 (Houston 2018); Marathon: 2:26:33 (London 2019)
Medal record
Women's athletics
Representing the United States
Continental Cup
Bronze medal – third place	2010 Split	5000 m
World Marathon Majors
Bronze medal – third place	2016 New York City	Marathon
- Updated on January 14, 2018

Molly Huddle (born August 31, 1984) is an American long-distance runner who competes in track and cross country running events. She held the American record in the 5000 meters set in 2014 in Monaco (14:42.64), which has since been lowered by Shannon Rowbury, Shelby Houlihan and Alicia Monson. Huddle held also the American record in the 10,000 meters set at the 2016 Rio Olympics with a time of 30:13.17, which has since been lowered by Alicia Monson. At the USA Outdoor Track and Field Championships she is three-time winner of the 5000 m and five-time winner of the 10,000 m. She placed third in the 2016 and fourth in the 2018 New York City Marathon.

In 2019 at the London Marathon, she lowered her personal best to 2:26:33, finishing 12th.

== Early life ==
Molly Huddle was born on August 31, 1984, in Elmira, New York. Huddle attended high school at Notre Dame High School in Elmira, New York from 1998 to 2002.

== Running career ==
=== High school ===
While attending Notre Dame High School, Huddle won multiple state championships in cross country and track. Huddle twice earned All-America honors in outdoor track and field (one and two mile runs), while also garnering All-America recognition in indoor track and field and cross country as a senior. Huddle did not start running cross country until her senior year because her high school did not have a team. She ran as one-runner team in 2001, with her father as coach. Her school had not had a full team since 1987; however, a team was started in the fall of 2014. Huddle was undefeated in cross country during the senior year regular season, winning conference, regional and state titles, set 12 course records and finished fourth at the 2001 Foot Locker Cross Country Championships. Huddle earned two outdoor track conference, regional and state championships. Huddle won the 2002 Nike Indoor Classic (one mile) and 2002 Adidas Outdoor Championships (two mile) as a senior, setting a meet record in the former event (4:46), while she established new national high school record in the outdoor two-mile run (10:01).

=== College ===
Huddle attended college at University of Notre Dame from 2002 to 2006. She was a 10-time All-American. In 2004, Huddle set a school record for women's 5000 m outdoor at the Mt. SAC Relays in 15:32.55.

=== 2006–2010 ===
Huddle placed ninth in the 5000 m in 15:44.66 at the 2006 USA Outdoor Track and Field Championships.

She placed sixth in the 10,000 m in 33:09.27 at the 2007 USA Outdoor Track and Field Championships.

Huddle placed ninth in the 10,000 m in 33:17.73 and tenth in the 5000 m in 15:42.19 at the 2008 United States Olympic Trials.

She placed fifth in the 10,000 m at the 2009 USA Outdoor Track and Field Championships in a time of 32:43.11 behind Amy Begley-Yoder, Shalane Flanagan, Katie McGregor and Magdalena Lewy-Boulet.

Huddle's 19th-place finish at the 2010 IAAF World Cross Country Championships in Bydgoszcz, Poland, helped the American team win a bronze medal. She earned a silver medal in the 5000 m at the 2010 USA Outdoor Track and Field Championships in a time of 15:30.89 behind Lauren Fleshman. Huddle set the American record in the 5000 m at the 2010 Memorial Van Damme Diamond League meet in Brussels, Belgium (14:44.76). On October 11, 2010, Huddle won her third consecutive United States Women's 10k road race championship in Boston, Massachusetts.

=== 2011 ===
Huddle was the runner-up at the 2011 USA Cross Country Championships, earning a spot for the world championships team. She again helped the American team win a bronze medal at the 2011 IAAF World Cross Country Championships, finishing 17th overall.

On June 24, 2011, Huddle captured the 5000 m at the 2011 USA Outdoor Track and Field Championships with a time of 15:10.01. Her performance qualified her for the 2011 World Championships. After battling injuries during the 2011 summer, Huddle failed to qualify during her heat at the World Championships.

=== 2012 ===
At the 2012 USA Cross Country Championships, Huddle was leading throughout but was beaten at the finish line by Sara Hall, ending the race as runner-up.

On June 28, 2012, Huddle finished 2nd by 0.8 seconds to Julie Culley in the 5000 m at the 2012 United States Olympic Trials to qualify for the 2012 London Olympics. After running 15:02.26 in the Olympic semifinals, Huddle finished in 15:20.29 in the 5000 m final to finish 11th.

=== 2013 ===
In June 2013, Huddle finished 2nd by 2 seconds to Jennifer Simpson in the 5000 m at the 2013 USA Outdoor Track and Field Championships. On August 17, 2013, she finished 6th in a time of 15:05.73 in the women's 5000 m final at the World Championships in Moscow, the highest American female finish ever in that event at the World Championships.

On November 17, 2013, Huddle won the 12k United States National championship in 37:50, 8 seconds ahead of Shalane Flanagan. She set a 12k world record in this race.

=== 2014 ===
On May 4, 2014, Huddle improved her 10,000 m time to 30:47.59 in Palo Alto, California, at the Payton Jordan Invitational at Stanford University. The following month, on June 14, she broke the American record at the New York Mini 10K with a time of 31:37.

On June 27, Huddle won another 5,000 m US outdoor title in Sacramento, California, with a time of 15:01.56, passing Shannon Rowbury in the final meters (15:01.71).

At the Morton Games on July 11, 2014, she won the International Women's Mile in 4:26.8, breaking a stadium record and setting a new personal best. On July 18, Huddle ran a personal best mark of 14:42.64 to improve her own outdoor 5000 m United States record at the Diamond League Herculis Monaco meet. On November 16, 2014, Huddle won the 12k United States National championship in 38:08.

=== 2015 ===
On March 15, Huddle beat Kenya's Joyce Chepkirui with an 11-second margin to win the 2015 New York City Half Marathon in a personal best of 1:08:31. For this victory, Huddle was shown in Marie Claire magazine's "The 8 Greatest Moments for Women in Sports".

On June 25, Huddle won the 10,000 m at the 2015 USA Outdoor Track and Field Championships in Eugene, Oregon. This was her first United States 10k title. At the 2015 Beijing World Championships, Huddle finished fourth in the 10,000 m, being caught in the final steps by team member Emily Infeld due to a premature celebration (she was in third place immediately before celebrating, a few metres before the finish line).

Huddle won a national title at the United States 5k road championships. She set a championship record at the USATF 10 Mile Championships on October 4 in Minneapolis-St. Paul. Huddle won her 19th USATF title on October 12, in a women's only 10 km (road) at the Tufts Health Plan 10K for Women with a time of 32:16. She won the US National 12K road race Championship in Alexandria, Virginia, on November 15, 2015, finishing in 38:36.

=== 2016 ===
On February 20, 2016, Huddle finished a close second in the Millrose Games women's indoor 5000 m in 14:57.31, behind Betsy Saina. She won the New York City Half Marathon on March 20 with a time of 1:07:41, narrowly beating Joyce Chepkirui at the finish line. The time was just 7 seconds off Deena Kastor's American record of 1:07:34 at the 2006 Berlin Half Marathon and the fastest American for a women's only race. On April 16, Huddle won the B.A.A. 5k with a time of 15:14.

In July, Huddle won the 5000 m in 15:05.01 and 10,000 m in 31:41.62 at 2016 United States Olympic Trials. On August 12, 2016, Huddle achieved an American record of 30:13.17 in the 10,000 m at the 2016 Olympics while placing sixth, breaking Shalane Flanagan's 2008 Olympic time of 30:22.22. The world record was broken in the same race by Almaz Ayana in a time of 29:17.45.

In November 2016, Huddle ran the 2016 New York City Marathon as her marathon debut. She finished in 3rd place in 2:28:13.

=== 2017 ===
Huddle won the 2017 New York Road Runners New York Half Marathon in 68:19, 2 seconds ahead of her training partner Emily Sisson. Her half marathon time was in the all-time top ten for American runners.

On June 22 and 25, she raced at the 2017 USA Outdoor Track and Field Championships, winning gold in the 10,000 m in 31:19.86 and bronze in the 5,000 meters in 15:15.29. On August 5, Huddle ran 31:24.78 to place 8th in the 10000 m at the 2017 World Championships. On August 10 and 13, Huddle ran 15:05.28 to place 12th in the 5000 m.

Huddle beat Molly Seidel at the 2017 USATF Road 5k Championships Abbott Dash to the Finishline 5k in 15:24, Huddle's 24th national title.

=== 2018 ===
Huddle broke Deena Kastor’s 67:34 American record in the half marathon, which had stood since 2006, at the Aramco Houston Half Marathon on January 14, 2018, by running 67:25 to finish in seventh place in a race won by Ethiopia’s Ruti Aga, the 2017 Berlin Marathon runner-up, in 66:39. Huddle's Half Marathon record was broken by Sara Hall in January 2022 Houston Half Marathon by 10 seconds.

Huddle placed 4th in a new personal best marathon time of 2:26:44 at 2018 New York City Marathon.

=== 2019 ===
On March 29, Huddle finished second behind Emily Sisson in the Stanford Invitational 10000m running 30:58:46, more than 68 seconds ahead of the following pack. On July 25, she won her fifth consecutive United States Track and Field 10,000 meter title, running 31.58.47. It was her 28th national title. Sisson finished second, close behind in 32:02.19. Huddle lowered her marathon PR to 2:26:33 in the London Marathon.

== Personal life ==
Huddle resides and trains in Providence, Rhode Island. She is married to Canadian middle distance runner Kurt Benninger, who also ran for the University of Notre Dame, where he earned six All-American honors in track and cross country.

Huddle is credited, in part, for the creation of the female runner emoji, along with her former training partner, Roisin McGettigan.

On April 26, 2022, she and her husband had a daughter, Josephine Valerie Benninger.

== Personal bests ==
Track	Event	Time (min)	Venue	Date
Indoor	3000 m	9:00.82	New York (Armory), New York	February 20, 2016
Indoor	5000 m	14:57.31	New York (Armory), New York	February 20, 2016
Outdoor	1500 m	4:08.09	Lignano Sabbiadoro, Italy	July 16, 2013
Outdoor	Mile	4:26.84	Dublin, Ireland	July 11, 2014
Outdoor	3000 m	8:42.99	London, England	July 26, 2013
Outdoor	5000 m	14:42.64*	Fontvieille, Monaco	July 18, 2014
Outdoor	10000 m	30:13.17 NR AR	Rio de Janeiro, Brazil	August 12, 2016
Road	5k	14:50	Boston, Massachusetts	April 18, 2015
Road	10k	31:34	Houston, Texas	January 14, 2018
Road	12k	37:50	Alexandria, Virginia	November 17, 2013
Road	15k	47:29	Houston, Texas	January 14, 2018
Road	10 mile	50:52 (unofficial U.S. record)	Houston, Texas	January 14, 2018
Road	20k	1:03:48 NR AR	Houston, Texas	January 14, 2018
Road	Half Marathon	1:07:26 NR AR	Houston, Texas	January 14, 2018
Road	30k	1:44:50	New York, New York	November 6, 2016
Road	Marathon	2:26:33	London, England	April 28, 2019

* On July 18, 2014, Huddle set the U.S. 5000m record, which was broken on September 9, 2016, by Shannon Rowbury.
