= Takashi Yamamoto =

Takashi Yamamoto is the name of:

- Takashi Yamamoto (swimmer) (born 1978), Japanese swimmer
- Takashi Yamamoto (politician) (1949–2007), Japanese politician of the Democratic Party of Japan
- Takashi Yamamoto (pianist), Japanese pianist
