= Toshio Yamamoto =

Toshio Yamamoto may refer to:

- Tosanoumi Toshio, (born 1972 as Toshio Yamamoto), sumo wrestler
- Toshio Yamamoto (mountaineer), Japanese mountaineer
