= Toshikatsu Yamamoto =

Japanese physician (1929–2026)

Toshikatsu Yamamoto (山元敏勝, Yamamoto Toshikatsu) (15 December 1929 – 20 January 2026) was a Japanese physician who worked in the field of acupuncture.

== Life and career ==
Toshikatsu Yamamoto graduated in 1956 from his studies of medicine at the Nippon Medical School in Tokyo. After that he gained qualification in surgery, anesthesia, and obstetrics in New Jersey, New York and Cologne, Germany. In 1966 he went back to his home country and founded a hospital.

During the 1960s he developed Yamamoto New Scalp Acupuncture (YNSA). In 1991 he graduated from the University of Miyazaki with the research for scalp acupuncture. In 1998 he founded the Yamamoto Rehabilitation Clinic in Miyazaki.

Yamamoto died on 20 January 2026, at the age of 96.

== Bibliography ==
- Yamamoto, Toshikatsu, Yamamoto Neue Schädelakupunktur. Kötzting/Bayer. Wald, ISBN 3-927344-66-4 (1985, 1991 & 2004).
- Yamamoto, Toshikatsu, Yamamoto new scalp acupuncture, DVD-Video (2005).
