= Yamoto =

Yamoto may refer to:

- Yamoto Station, a JR East railway station in Higashi-Matsushima, Miyagi, Japan
- Yamoto River, one of the rivers that forms the Tsurumi River in Japan
- The former town of Yamoto, Miyagi, now part of Higashimatsushima

== See also ==
- Yamato
