= Space Battleship Yamato (disambiguation) =

Space Battleship Yamato (宇宙戦艦ヤマト, Uchū Senkan Yamato) may refer to:

- Space Battleship Yamato, a 1974 animated series
- Space Battleship Yamato (1977 film), a 1977 animated film
- Space Battleship Yamato (2010 film), a 2010 live-action film
