= Hiroyuki Yamamoto (runner) =

Japanese long-distance runner

Hiroyuki
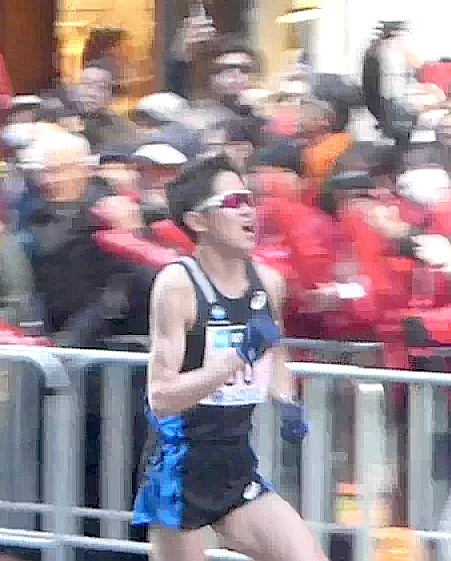
- Yamamoto at the 2017 Tokyo Marathon

Personal information
- Nationality: Japanese
- Born: April 30, 1986 (age 40) Japan

Sport
- Sport: Track; Road Racing
- Event(s): Marathon, 10,000 metres, 5000 metres

Achievements and titles
- Personal bests: 5000 m: 13:45.43 (Kitami 2010); 10,000 m: 27:55.40 (Hachioji 2015); Half marathon: 62:43 (Marugame 2017); Marathon: 2:09:12 (Tokyo 2017)

Hiroyuki Yamamoto (born April 30, 1986) is a Japanese professional long-distance runner.

Yamamoto has competed at several major marathons throughout his professional career. His 4th-place finish at the 2016 TCS New York City Marathon earned him $25,000 in prize money. As of January, 2021, his 10th-place finish at the 2017 Tokyo Marathon makes him the 82nd fastest marathoner in Japanese history and the 792 fastest marathoner in world history in a time of 2:09:12.
